= List of restaurant chains in the United States =

The following is a list of notable restaurant chains in the United States.

== Asian/Pacific ==
Name	Original location	Founded	Headquarters	Parent company	Number of U.S. locations	Areas served
BonChon Chicken	Busan, South Korea	2002	Dallas, Texas		133	Nationwide
Cupbop	Salt Lake County, Utah	2013	Salt Lake City, Utah		68	Mountain states, Oklahoma
Din Tai Fung	Taipei, Taiwan	Taiwan 1958, USA 2000	Taipei, Taiwan		23	Arizona, California, Nevada, New York, Oregon, Washington
L&L Hawaiian Barbecue (Note: Known as L&L Drive-Inn in Hawaii)	Honolulu, Hawaii	1976	Honolulu, Hawaii		253	Nationwide
Manchu Wok	Peterborough, Ontario, Canada	1980	Markham, Ontario, Canada	MTY Food Group	14	Alabama, California, Florida, Illinois, Nevada, New York, Washington
Noodles & Company	Denver, Colorado	1995	Broomfield, Colorado		448	Nationwide
Ono Hawaiian BBQ	Santa Monica, California	2002	Santa Monica, California		100	Nationwide
Panda Express	Glendale, California	1983	Rosemead, California	Panda Restaurant Group	2,316	Nationwide
Pei Wei Asian Diner	Scottsdale, Arizona	2000	Irving, Texas	PWD Acquisition LLC	119	South, West, Mid-Atlantic, Upper Midwest
Phở Hòa	San Jose, California	1983	Sacramento, California		18	Nationwide
Pick Up Stix	Rancho Santa Margarita, California	1989	Laguna Hills, California		38	Southern California, Nevada, Texas, Utah
Sarku Japan	Boston, Massachusetts	1987	Markham, Ontario, Canada		167	Nationwide
Yoshinoya	Tokyo, Japan	1899	Kita, Tokyo, Japan		103	California

== Baked goods ==
Name	Original location	Founded	Headquarters	Parent company	Number of U.S. locations	Areas served
Au Bon Pain	Boston, Massachusetts	1976	Richardson, Texas	AMPEX Brands	121	Nationwide
Auntie Anne's	Downingtown, Pennsylvania	1988	Sandy Springs, Georgia	Focus Brands	1,133	Nationwide
Bruegger's Bagels	Troy, New York	1983	Denver, Colorado	JAB Holding Company	164	Nationwide
Cinnabon	Federal Way, Washington	1985	Sandy Springs, Georgia	Focus Brands	939	Nationwide
Crumbl Cookies	Logan, Utah	2017	Lindon, Utah		1,071	Nationwide
Daylight Donuts	Tulsa, Oklahoma	1954	Tulsa, Oklahoma		354	Midwest
Duck Donuts	Duck, North Carolina	2006	Hampden Township, Pennsylvania		127	Nationwide
Einstein Bros. Bagels	Golden, Colorado	1995	Lakewood, Colorado	JAB Holding Company	690	Nationwide
Golden Krust	The Bronx, New York	1989	The Bronx, New York		99	Connecticut, Florida, Georgia, Maryland, New Jersey, New York, North Carolina, Texas
Great American Cookies	Dunwoody, Georgia	1977	Atlanta, Georgia	FAT Brands	372	Nationwide
Great Harvest Bread Company	Great Falls, Montana	1976	Dillon, Montana		176	Nationwide
Honey Dew Donuts	Mansfield, Massachusetts	1973	Plainville, Massachusetts		102	New England
Insomnia Cookies	Philadelphia, Pennsylvania	2003	Philadelphia, Pennsylvania	Krispy Kreme	210	Nationwide
Krispy Kreme	Winston-Salem, North Carolina	1937	Charlotte, North Carolina	JAB Holding Company	373	Nationwide
La Madeleine	Dallas, Texas	1983	Dallas, Texas	Groupe Le Duff	86	Southeast, Mid-Atlantic, Midwest
Le Pain Quotidien	Brussels, Belgium	1990	New York, New York		260	Mid-Atlantic, Florida, Illinois, California
Mrs. Fields	Palo Alto, California	1977	Broomfield, Colorado	Famous Brands International	90	Nationwide
Pretzelmaker	Pennsylvania	1991	Atlanta, Georgia	FAT Brands	86	Nationwide
Shipley Do-Nuts	Houston, Texas	1936	Houston, Texas	Peak Rock Capital	300+	Southern states, Colorado
Wetzel's Pretzels	Redondo Beach, California	1994	Pasadena, California	CenterOak Partners LLC	350	Nationwide
Winchell's Donuts	Temple City, California	1948	City of Industry, California	Yum-Yum Donuts	170	West, Midwest
Yum-Yum Donuts	Los Angeles, California	1971	City of Industry, California		71	California

== Beverages ==
Name	Original location	Founded	Headquarters	Number of U.S. locations	Areas served
7 Brew Coffee	Rogers, Arkansas	2017	Springdale, Arkansas	709	Nationwide
7 Leaves Cafe	Westminster, California	2011	Garden Grove, California	43	California, Nevada, Arizona, Texas, Georgia
Argo Tea	Chicago, Illinois	2003	Chicago, Illinois	41	East and Upper Midwest
Biggby Coffee	East Lansing, Michigan	1995	Lansing, Michigan	265	Southeast and Midwest
Caribou Coffee	Edina, Minnesota	1992	Brooklyn Center, Minnesota	460	Midwest
The Coffee Bean & Tea Leaf	Los Angeles, California	1963	Los Angeles, California	180	South & West
Coffee Beanery	Dearborn, Michigan	1976	Flushing, Michigan	24	Nationwide
Dunkin' Donuts	Quincy, Massachusetts	1950	Canton, Massachusetts	9,244	Nationwide
Dunn Brothers Coffee	Saint Paul, Minnesota	1987	Minneapolis, Minnesota	46	Midwest
Dutch Bros. Coffee	Grants Pass, Oregon	1992	Grants Pass, Oregon	538	Nationwide
Gloria Jean's Coffees	Long Grove, Illinois	1979	Castle Hill, New South Wales, Australia	31	Nationwide
Gregorys Coffee	New York, New York	2006	New York, New York	51	Northeast, South, West
Heine Brothers'	Louisville, Kentucky	1994	Louisville, Kentucky	18	Kentucky
Intelligentsia Coffee & Tea	Chicago, Illinois	1995	Chicago, Illinois	12	Nationwide
It's Boba Time	Los Angeles, California	2003	Los Angeles, California	95	Southwestern United States
Jamba Juice	San Luis Obispo, California	1990	Atlanta, Georgia	757	Nationwide
Juice It Up!	Brea, California	1995	Irvine, California	85	West
Kung Fu Tea	Queens, New York	2010	New York, New York	278	Nationwide
Orange Julius	Los Angeles, California	1926	Edina, Minnesota	5,700	Nationwide
Peet's Coffee	Berkeley, California	1966	Emeryville, California	230	West and Midwest
Philz Coffee	San Francisco, California	2002	San Francisco, California	57	Nationwide
Planet Smoothie	Atlanta, Georgia	1995	Scottsdale, Arizona	100+	Nationwide
Robeks	Los Angeles, California	1996	Los Angeles, California	91	West
Smoothie King	Kenner, Louisiana	1973	Coppell, Texas	1,053	Nationwide
Starbucks	Seattle, Washington	1971	Seattle, Washington	15,450	Nationwide
Swig	St. George, Utah	2010	American Fork, Utah	164	South, Midwest, West
Tim Hortons	Hamilton, Ontario, Canada	1964	Toronto, Ontario, Canada	637	North
Tropical Smoothie Cafe	Destin, Florida	1997	Atlanta, Georgia	1,047	Nationwide

== Chicken ==
Name	Original location	Founded	Headquarters	Number of U.S. locations	Areas served
Bojangles' Famous Chicken 'n Biscuits	Charlotte, North Carolina	1977	Charlotte, North Carolina	773	Southeast
Boston Market	Newton, Massachusetts	1984	Golden, Colorado	22	Nationwide
Brown's Chicken & Pasta	Bridgeview, Illinois	1949	Villa Park, Illinois	19	Illinois
Bush's Chicken	Waco, Texas	1996	Waco, Texas	73	Texas
Chester's International	Birmingham, Alabama	1952	Mountain Brook, Alabama	1,000+	Nationwide
Chick-fil-A	Hapeville, Georgia	1946	College Park, Georgia	2,704	Nationwide
Chicken Express	Benbrook, Texas	1988	Burleson, Texas	245	Nationwide
Chicken Salad Chick	Auburn, Alabama	2008	Auburn, Alabama	346	Southeast, Midwest
Church's Chicken	San Antonio, Texas	1952	Atlanta, Georgia	898	Nationwide
Cluck-U Chicken	New Brunswick, New Jersey	1985	College Park, Maryland	17	Mid-Atlantic
Dave's Hot Chicken	Los Angeles, California	2017	Pasadena, California	283	Nationwide
El Pollo Loco	Guasave, Sinaloa, Mexico	1974	Costa Mesa, California	480	West
Golden Chick	San Marcos, Texas	1967	Richardson, Texas	207	Nationwide
Grandy's	Dallas, Texas	1972	Nashville, Tennessee	15	Texas, Oklahoma, Georgia
Guthrie's	Haleyville, Alabama	1964	Auburn, Alabama	73	South, Idaho, Nevada
Harold's Chicken Shack	Chicago, Illinois	1950	Chicago, Illinois	47	Midwest, South, Southwest
Hartz Chicken	Texas	1972	Spring, Texas	56	Louisiana, Texas
Jollibee	Pasig, Philippines	1978	Pasig, Philippines	83	West, Mid-Atlantic, Hawaii
KFC	North Corbin, Kentucky	1952	Louisville, Kentucky	3,953	Nationwide
Lee's Famous Recipe Chicken	Lima, Ohio	1966	Fort Walton Beach, Florida	131	South and Midwest
Louisiana Famous Fried Chicken	Los Angeles, California	1976	Los Angeles, California	148	California, Texas
Maryland Fried Chicken	Orlando, Florida	1961	Los Angeles, California	160	20 US states and The Bahamas
Pioneer Chicken	Los Angeles, California	1961	Los Angeles, California	2	Los Angeles area
Pollo Campero	Guatemala	1971	Dallas, Texas	150	Nationwide
Pollo Tropical	Miami, Florida	1988	Doral, Florida	169	Southeast
Popeyes	Arabi, Louisiana	1972	Miami, Florida	2,754	Nationwide
Raising Cane's Chicken Fingers	Baton Rouge, Louisiana	1996	Baton Rouge, Louisiana	900+	Nationwide
Slim Chickens	Fayetteville, Arkansas	2003	Fayetteville, Arkansas	116	Nationwide
Smithfield's Chicken 'N Bar-B-Q	Smithfield, North Carolina	1977	Smithfield, North Carolina	39	North Carolina
Wingstop	Garland, Texas	1994	Addison, Texas	1,534	Nationwide
Zaxby's	Statesboro, Georgia	1990	Athens, Georgia	910	Southeast (and Utah)

== Chili ==
Name	Original location	Founded	Headquarters	Number of U.S. locations	Areas served
Gold Star Chili	Cincinnati, Ohio	1965	Cincinnati, Ohio	85	Southern Ohio, Northern Kentucky
Skyline Chili	Cincinnati, Ohio	1949	Fairfield, Ohio	160	Ohio, Indiana, Kentucky, Florida

== Frozen desserts ==
Name	Original location	Founded	Headquarters	Number of U.S. locations	Areas served
Andy's Frozen Custard	Osage Beach, Missouri	1986	Springfield, Missouri	140	Nationwide
Baskin-Robbins	Glendale, California	1945	Canton, Massachusetts	2,317	Nationwide
Ben & Jerry's	Burlington, Vermont	1978	South Burlington, Vermont	221	Nationwide
Bruster's Ice Cream	Bridgewater, Pennsylvania	1990	Bridgewater, Pennsylvania	208	Nationwide
Carvel	Hartsdale, New York	1929	Farmington, Connecticut	371	Nationwide
Cauldron Ice Cream	Santa Ana, California	2015	Santa Ana, California	6	California, Texas
Cold Stone Creamery	Tempe, Arizona	1988	Scottsdale, Arizona	875	Nationwide
Dairy Queen	Joliet, Illinois	1940	Edina, Minnesota	4,339	Nationwide
Fosters Freeze	Inglewood, California	1946	Atlanta, Georgia	54	California & Georgia
Golden Spoon	Tustin, California	1981	Rancho Santa Margarita, California	23	California
Graeter's	Cincinnati, Ohio	1874	Cincinnati, Ohio	53	Midwest
Häagen-Dazs	Brooklyn, New York	1961	Minneapolis, Minnesota	600	Nationwide
Handel's Homemade Ice Cream & Yogurt	Youngstown, Ohio	1945	Canfield, Ohio	45	West, Great Lakes, Alabama, Pennsylvania
MaggieMoo's Ice Cream and Treatery	Kansas City, Missouri	1989	Fulton County, Georgia	10	Nationwide
Marble Slab Creamery	Houston, Texas	1983	Fulton County, Georgia	391	Nationwide
Meadows Frozen Custard	Duncansville, Pennsylvania	1950	Blair County, Pennsylvania	29	Nationwide
Menchie's Frozen Yogurt	San Fernando Valley, California	2007	Encino, California	345	Nationwide
Oberweis Dairy	Kane County, Illinois	1927	North Aurora, Illinois	41	Upper Midwest
Pinkberry	West Hollywood, California	2005	Scottsdale, Arizona	260	Nationwide
Popbar	New York, New York	2010	New York, New York	16	East Coast, California
Red Mango	Los Angeles, California	2006	Dallas, Texas	50	Nationwide
Rita's Italian Ice	Philadelphia, Pennsylvania	1984	Bensalem, Pennsylvania	600+	Nationwide
Sweet Frog	Richmond, Virginia	2009	Richmond, Virginia	350+	Nationwide
Tastee-Freez	Joliet, Illinois	1950	Newport Beach, California	23	Mid-Atlantic and Midwest
TCBY	Little Rock, Arkansas	1981	Broomfield, Colorado	116	Nationwide
Tropical Sno	Provo, Utah	1984	Draper, Utah		Nationwide
Tutti Frutti Frozen Yogurt	California	2008	Fullerton, California	100+	West
Wanderlust Creamery	Los Angeles, California	2015	Los Angeles, California	7	Southern California
Whitey's Ice Cream	Moline, Illinois	1933	Moline, Illinois	9	Quad Cities Metro Area
Yogen Früz	Thornhill, Ontario, Canada	1986	Markham, Ontario, Canada	2	New York, Texas
Yogurtland	Fullerton, California	2006	Irvine, California	326	Nationwide

== Hamburgers ==
Name	Original location	Founded	Headquarters	Number of U.S. locations	Areas served	Notes
A&W Restaurants	Lodi, California	1919	Lexington, Kentucky	900+	Nationwide	
Arctic Circle Restaurants	Midvale, Utah	1950	Salt Lake City, Utah	71	West	
Back Yard Burgers	Cleveland, Mississippi	1987	Nashville, Tennessee	15	South and Midwest	
Baker's Drive-Thru	San Bernardino, California	1952	San Bernardino, California	39	Inland Empire	
Big Boy	Glendale, California	1936	Warren, Michigan	66	Midwest and California	6 locations under the name Dolly's Burgers and Shakes
Blake's Lotaburger	Albuquerque, New Mexico	1952	Albuquerque, New Mexico	75	Southwest	
Braum's	Oklahoma City, Oklahoma	1968	Tuttle, Oklahoma	290	West South Central states, Missouri, Kansas	
Bumper's Drive-In	Canton, Mississippi	1983	Canton, Mississippi	30	Mississippi and Tennessee	
Burger King	Jacksonville, Florida	1953	Miami-Dade County, Florida	7,105	Nationwide	
Burger Street	Lewisville, Texas	1985	Dallas, Texas	14	South Central states	
BurgerFi	Lauderdale-by-the-Sea, Florida	2011	Palm Beach, Florida	65	East and Midwest	
Burgerville	Vancouver, Washington	1961	Vancouver, Washington	47	Pacific Northwest	
Carl's Jr. Hardee's	Los Angeles, California; Rocky Mount, North Carolina	1941; 1960	Franklin, Tennessee	2,774 1,062 (Carl's Jr.); 1,712 (Hardee's)	Nationwide	Carl's Jr. in the West, Hardee's in the East
Checkers; Rally's	Mobile, Alabama; Louisville, Kentucky	1985; 1986	Tampa, Florida	895 580 (Checkers); 315 (Rally's)	Nationwide	Checkers in the Southeast and Northeast, Rally's in the Midwest, California, and Hampton Roads, Virginia.
Cheeburger Cheeburger	Sanibel, Florida	1986	Fort Myers, Florida	2	Florida and Virginia	Virginia location is inside the Richmond International Airport
Cook Out	Greensboro, North Carolina	1989	Thomasville, North Carolina	319+	Southeast	
Culver's	Sauk City, Wisconsin	1984	Prairie du Sac, Wisconsin	1,000+	Midwest and Southeast	
Duchess	Bridgeport, Connecticut	1956	Milford, Connecticut	12	Connecticut	
Farmer Boys	Perris, California	1981	Riverside, California	101	California	
Fatburger	Los Angeles, California	1947	Beverly Hills, California	200+	West	
Five Guys	Arlington County, Virginia	1986	Lorton, Virginia	1,453	Nationwide	
Freddy's Frozen Custard & Steakburgers	Wichita, Kansas	2002	Wichita, Kansas	450	Nationwide	
Frisch's Big Boy	Cincinnati, Ohio	1939	Cincinnati, Ohio	31	Ohio, Indiana, Kentucky, Tennessee	
Fuddruckers	San Antonio, Texas	1979	Houston, Texas	42	Nationwide	
Good Times Burgers & Frozen Custard	Boulder, Colorado	1987	Lakewood, Colorado	31	Colorado & Wyoming	
Griff's Hamburgers	Kansas City, Missouri	1960	Richardson, Texas	12	Texas, New Mexico, & Louisiana	
The Habit Burger Grill	Santa Barbara, California	1969	Irvine, California	358	Nationwide	
Hwy 55 Burgers Shakes & Fries	Goldsboro, North Carolina	1991	Mount Olive, North Carolina	108	South and Midwest	
In-N-Out Burger	Baldwin Park, California	1948	Irvine, California	387	West, Tennessee and Texas	
Jack in the Box	San Diego, California	1951	San Diego, California	2,197	Nationwide, except for the Northeast and Mid-Atlantic	
Jack's	Homewood, Alabama	1960	Sumiton, Alabama	238	Southeast	
Krystal	Chattanooga, Tennessee	1932	Atlanta, Georgia	266	Southeast	
McDonald's	San Bernardino, California	1940	Chicago, Illinois	13,520	Nationwide	
MidCity SmashedBurger	Portland, Oregon	2020	Portland, Oregon	3	Oregon	
Milo's Hamburgers	Birmingham, Alabama	1946	Birmingham, Alabama	22	Alabama	
Mooyah	Plano, Texas	2007	Plano, Texas	100+	Nationwide	
Nation's Giant Hamburgers	San Pablo, California	1952	El Cerrito, California	31	Northern California and North Texas	
Original Tommy's	Los Angeles, California	1946	Monrovia, California	34	West	
Shake Shack	New York, New York	2004	New York, New York	262	Nationwide	
Smashburger	Denver, Colorado	2007	Denver, Colorado	220	Nationwide	
Sonic Drive-In	Shawnee, Oklahoma	1953	Oklahoma City, Oklahoma	3,545	Nationwide	
Spangles	Wichita, Kansas	1978	Wichita, Kansas	27	Kansas	
Steak 'n Shake	Normal, Illinois	1934	Indianapolis, Indiana	403	Midwest, South, California	
Swensons	Akron, Ohio	1934	Akron, Ohio	20	Indiana, Ohio	
Umami Burger	Los Angeles, California	2009	Los Angeles, California	25	California, Washington, North East, Florida	
Ward's	Hattiesburg, Mississippi	1978	Hattiesburg, Mississippi	38	Mississippi	
Wayback Burgers	Newark, Delaware	1991	Cheshire, Connecticut	156	Nationwide	
Wendy's	Columbus, Ohio	1969	Dublin, Ohio	6,004	Nationwide	
Whataburger	Corpus Christi, Texas	1950	San Antonio, Texas	948	Nationwide	
White Castle	Wichita, Kansas	1921	Columbus, Ohio	345	Midwest, Arizona	
Zip's Drive-in	Kennewick, Washington	1953	Kennewick, Washington	39	Washington, Idaho	

== Hot dogs ==
Name	Original location	Founded	Headquarters	Number of U.S. locations	Areas served
Hot Dog on a Stick	Santa Monica, California	1946	Carlsbad, California	37	West
James Coney Island	Houston, Texas	1923	Houston, Texas	5	Texas
Nathan's Famous	Brooklyn, New York	1916	Jericho, New York	213	Nationwide
Portillo's Restaurants	Villa Park, Illinois	1963	Oak Brook, Illinois	107	Illinois, Indiana, Arizona, California, Wisconsin, Minnesota, Florida, Georgia, Iowa, Texas, Michigan
Sneaky Pete's	Birmingham, Alabama	1966	Birmingham, Alabama	30	Alabama
Ted's Hot Dogs	Buffalo, New York	1927	Buffalo, New York	9	New York, Arizona
Wienerschnitzel	Los Angeles, California	1961	Irvine, California	322	West, Texas, Louisiana, Illinois, Nebraska, Arkansas

== Mediterranean ==
Name	Original location	Founded	Headquarters	Number of U.S. locations	Areas served
Cava	Rockville, Maryland	2011	Washington, D.C.	170	Nationwide
Daphne's Greek Cafe	California	1991	Los Angeles, California	4	California
The Halal Guys	New York, New York	1990	New York, New York	79	Nationwide
Pita Pit	Kingston, Ontario, Canada	1995	Coeur d'Alene, Idaho	47	Nationwide
Taziki's Mediterranean Cafe	Birmingham, Alabama	1998	Birmingham, Alabama	110	South & Midwest
Zankou Chicken	Beirut, Lebanon	1962	Vernon, California	12	Southern California

== Mexican/Tex-Mex ==
Name	Original location	Founded	Headquarters	Number of U.S. locations	Areas served
Baja Fresh	Scottsdale, Arizona	1990	Newbury Park, California	162	Nationwide
Cafe Rio	St. George, Utah	1997	Cottonwood Heights, Utah	150	
California Tortilla	Bethesda, Maryland	1995	Potomac, Maryland	51	
Chipotle Mexican Grill	Denver, Colorado	1993	Newport Beach, California	2,926	Nationwide
Del Taco	Yermo, California	1964	Lake Forest, California	690	
El Taco Tote	Ciudad Juárez, Chihuahua, Mexico	1988	El Paso, Texas	23	
Fuzzy's Taco Shop	Fort Worth, Texas	2001	Fort Worth, Texas	137	
Green/Red Burrito	Hawaiian Gardens, California	1980	Franklin, Tennessee	500+	
La Bamba Mexican Restaurant	Champaign, Illinois	1987	Champaign, Illinois	8	Illinois, Indiana, Wisconsin, Kentucky
La Salsa	Los Angeles, California	1979	Scottsdale, Arizona	4	
Mighty Taco	Buffalo, New York	1973	East Amherst, New York	19	
Moe's Southwest Grill	Atlanta, Georgia	2000	Atlanta, Georgia	657	Nationwide
Pancheros Mexican Grill	Iowa City, Iowa	1992	Coralville, Iowa	76	Midwest, Northeast
Qdoba	Denver, Colorado	1995	San Diego, California	739	
Rubio's Coastal Grill	San Diego, California	1983	Carlsbad, California	157	
Salsarita's Fresh Mexican Grill	Charlotte, North Carolina	2000	Charlotte, North Carolina	6	North Carolina
Taco Bell	Downey, California	1962	Irvine, California	7,002	Nationwide
Taco Bueno	Abilene, Texas	1967	Irving, Texas	123	Nationwide
Taco Cabana	San Antonio, Texas	1978	San Antonio, Texas	148	Nationwide
Taco del Mar	Seattle, Washington	1992	Denver, Colorado	100	
Tacos El Cuñado	Grand Rapids, Michigan	2008	Grand Rapids, Michigan	11	
Taco John's	Cheyenne, Wyoming	1969	Cheyenne, Wyoming	373	
Taco Mayo	Norman, Oklahoma	1978	Oklahoma City, Oklahoma	39	
Taco Palenque	Laredo, Texas	1987	Laredo, Texas	41	
Taco Time	Eugene, Oregon	1960	Scottsdale, Arizona	300+	
Taco Time (Northwest)	White Center, Washington	1962	Renton, Washington	70+	Washington
Taco Villa	Odessa, Texas	1968	Fort Worth, Texas and Lubbock, Texas	30	
Tijuana Flats	Winter Park, Florida	1995	Maitland, Florida	124	
Wahoo's Fish Taco	Costa Mesa, California	1988	Santa Ana, California	37	
Zantigo	Minneapolis, Minnesota	1969	Minneapolis, Minnesota	4	

== Pizza/Italian ==
Name	Original location	Founded	Headquarters	Number of U.S. locations	Areas served
America's Incredible Pizza Company	Springfield, Missouri	2002	Springfield, Missouri	73	Southeast
Big Mama's & Papa's Pizzeria	Los Angeles, California	1992	Los Angeles, California	12	Greater Los Angeles
Blackjack Pizza	Federal Heights, Colorado	1983	Bloomfield Hills, Michigan	35	Colorado, Wyoming, Arizona, Florida
Blaze Pizza	Irvine, California	2011	Pasadena, California	313	Nationwide
Cicis	Plano, Texas	1985	Irving, Texas	299	
D.P. Dough	Amherst, Massachusetts	1983	Columbus, Ohio	37	
Domino's	Ypsilanti, Michigan	1960	Ann Arbor, Michigan	6,560	Nationwide
Donatos Pizza	Columbus, Ohio	1963	Gahanna, Ohio	169	
East of Chicago Pizza	Willard, Ohio	1982	Lima, Ohio	80	
Fazoli's	Lexington, Kentucky	1988	Lexington, Kentucky	217	
Fox's Pizza Den	Pitcairn, Pennsylvania	1971	Murrysville, Pennsylvania	250	
Frank Pepe's	New Haven, Connecticut	1925	Meriden, CT	16	East
Gino's East	Chicago, Illinois	1966	Chicago, Illinois	6	
Gino's Pizza and Spaghetti	Huntington, West Virginia	1961	Huntington, West Virginia	40	
Giordano's Pizzeria	Chicago, Illinois	1974	Chicago, Illinois	69	
Godfather's Pizza	Omaha, Nebraska	1973	Omaha, Nebraska	445	
Grotto Pizza	Rehoboth Beach, Delaware	1960	Rehoboth Beach, Delaware	17	Delaware, Maryland, Pennsylvania
Happy's Pizza	Detroit, Michigan	1994	Farmington Hills, Michigan	65	Great Lakes and West
Happy Joe's	Bettendorf, Iowa	1972	Bettendorf, Iowa	39	Midwest, Arizona, Egypt
Hungry Howie's Pizza	Taylor, Michigan	1973	Madison Heights, Michigan	533	
Hunt Brothers Pizza	Nashville, Tennessee	1991	Nashville, Tennessee	8,000+	Midwest, East
Imo's Pizza	St. Louis, Missouri	1964	St. Louis, Missouri	99	Missouri, Illinois, Kansas
Jet's Pizza	Sterling Heights, Michigan	1978	Sterling Heights, Michigan	390	
Ledo Pizza	Adelphi, Maryland	1955	Annapolis, Maryland	116	
Little Caesars	Garden City, Michigan	1959	Detroit, Michigan	4,181	Nationwide
Lou Malnati's	Lincolnwood, Illinois	1971	Northbrook, Illinois	81	
Marco's Pizza	Oregon, Ohio	1978	Toledo, Ohio	1,002	Nationwide
Mazzio's	Tulsa, Oklahoma	1961	Tulsa, Oklahoma	165	
MOD Pizza	Seattle, Washington	2008	Bellevue, Washington	506	
Monical's Pizza	Toledo, Illinois	1959	Bradley, Illinois	40	Midwest
Mountain Mike's Pizza	Palo Alto, California	1978	Newport Beach, California	246	
Mr. Gatti's Pizza	Stephenville, Texas	1964	Fort Worth, Texas	140+	
Papa Gino's	Boston, Massachusetts	1961	Dedham, Massachusetts	97	
Papa John's Pizza	Jeffersonville, Indiana	1984	Jeffersontown, Kentucky	3,164	Nationwide
Papa Murphy's	Merger	1995	Vancouver, Washington	1,500+	
Pieology Pizzeria	Fullerton, California	2011	Rancho Santa Margarita, California	140	
Pizza Hut	Wichita, Kansas	1958	Plano, Texas	6,548	Nationwide
Pizza Inn	Dallas, Texas	1958	The Colony, Texas	158	
Pizza Patrón	Dallas, Texas	1986	San Antonio, Texas	100	
Pizza Ranch	Hull, Iowa	1981	Orange City, Iowa	213	
Pizzeria Regina	Boston, Massachusetts	1926	Woburn, Massachusetts	12	Massachusetts
Round Table Pizza	Menlo Park, California	1959	Atlanta, Georgia	416	
Sbarro	New York, New York	1956	Columbus, Ohio	296	
Uncle Maddio's Pizza Joint	Atlanta, Georgia	2009	Atlanta, Georgia	38	
We, the Pizza	Washington, D.C.	2010		5	East Coast

== Salad/vegetarian/vegan ==
Name	Original location	Founded	Headquarters	Number of U.S. locations	Areas served
Chopt	New York, New York	2001	New York, New York	70	East
Mixt Greens	San Francisco, California	2006	San Francisco, California	20	San Francisco Bay Area, and Los Angeles, California, and Dallas, Texas
Saladworks	Cherry Hill, New Jersey	1986	Conshohocken, Pennsylvania	100	East and Midwest
Sweetgreen	Washington, D.C.	2007	Culver City, California	213	East, Texas, Illinois, California
Veggie Grill	Irvine, California	2006	Santa Monica, California	29	West, Massachusetts
WaBa Grill	Los Angeles	2006		115	Western United States

== Sandwiches ==
Name	Original location	Founded	Headquarters	Number of U.S. locations	Areas served
Amato's	Portland, Maine	1902	Portland, Maine	49	New England
Arby's	Boardman, Ohio	1964	Sandy Springs, Georgia	3,409	Nationwide
Atlanta Bread Company	Sandy Springs, Georgia	1994	Smyrna, Georgia	9	
Biscuitville	Burlington, North Carolina	1966	Greensboro, North Carolina	88	North Carolina, South Carolina, Virginia
Blimpie	Hoboken, New Jersey	1964	Scottsdale, Arizona	154	Nationwide
Capriotti's	Wilmington, Delaware	1976	Las Vegas, Nevada	106	
Charleys Philly Steaks	Columbus, Ohio	1986	Columbus, Ohio	589	
Corner Bakery Cafe	Chicago, Illinois	1991	Dallas, Texas	161	Nationwide
Così	New York, New York	1996	Boston, Massachusetts	14	Nationwide
Cousins Subs	Milwaukee, Wisconsin	1972	Menomonee Falls, Wisconsin		
D'Angelo Grilled Sandwiches	Dedham, Massachusetts	1967	Dedham, Massachusetts	86	New England
DiBella's	Rochester, New York	1918	Rochester, New York	43	
Earl of Sandwich	Lake Buena Vista, Florida	2004	Orlando, Florida	31	
Eegee's	Tucson, Arizona	1971	Tucson, Arizona	28	
Erbert & Gerbert's	Eau Claire, Wisconsin	1987	Eau Claire, Wisconsin	50+	
Firehouse Subs	Jacksonville, Florida	1994	Jacksonville, Florida	1,164	Nationwide
Great Wraps		1974	Atlanta, Georgia	29	Nationwide
The Honey Baked Ham Company (Note: Primarily a retailer/caterer, but also offers a lunch menu)	Detroit, Michigan	1957	Alpharetta, Georgia	409	Nationwide
Jason's Deli	Beaumont, Texas	1976	Beaumont, Texas	247	Nationwide
Jerry's Subs & Pizza	Wheaton, Maryland	1954	Gaithersburg, Maryland	3	Maryland
Jersey Mike's Subs	Point Pleasant Beach, New Jersey	1956	Wall Township, New Jersey	2,100	Nationwide
Jimmy John's	Charleston, Illinois	1983	Champaign, Illinois	2,657	Nationwide
Kelly's Roast Beef	Revere, Massachusetts	1951		8	New England
Lee's Sandwiches	San Jose, California	1983	San Jose, California	61	
Lenny's Grill & Sub	Memphis, Tennessee	1998	Memphis, Tennessee	100	
Lion's Choice	Ballwin, Missouri	1967	St. Louis, Missouri	26	
Maid-Rite	Muscatine, Iowa	1926	Urbandale, Iowa	31	Midwest
McAlister's Deli	Oxford, Mississippi	1989	Sandy Springs, Georgia	506	
Mendocino Farms	Los Angeles, California	2005	Los Angeles, California	54	West
Miami Grill	Key West, Florida	1988	Fort Lauderdale, Florida	31	Southeast
Milio's	Madison, Wisconsin	1989	Fitchburg, Wisconsin	19	Wisconsin, Minnesota, Iowa
Newk's Eatery	Oxford, Mississippi	2004	Jackson, Mississippi	101	Southeast
Panera Bread	Kirkwood, Missouri	1987	Fenton, Missouri	2,121	Nationwide
Paris Baguette	Seoul, South Korea	1988	Seoul, South Korea	96	Nationwide
Penn Station East Coast Subs	Cincinnati, Ohio	1985	Cincinnati, Ohio	320	
Port of Subs	Sparks, Nevada	1972	Reno, Nevada	140+	
Potbelly Sandwich Shop	Chicago, Illinois	1977	Chicago, Illinois	443	
Pret a Manger	London, England, UK	1983	London, England, UK	81	
Primo Hoagies	South Philadelphia, Pennsylvania	1992	Westville, New Jersey	95	East
Quiznos	Denver, Colorado	1981	Denver, Colorado	134	
Rax Roast Beef	Springfield, Ohio	1967	Ironton, Ohio	8	
Roy Rogers Restaurants	Fort Wayne, Indiana	1968	Frederick, Maryland	41	Mid-Atlantic
Runza	Lincoln, Nebraska	1949	Lincoln, Nebraska	87	
Sandella's Flatbread Café	Redding, Connecticut	1994	Redding, Connecticut	130	
Schlotzsky's	Austin, Texas	1971	Atlanta, Georgia	323	Nationwide
Steak Escape	Columbus, Ohio	1982	Columbus, Ohio	100+	Nationwide
Subway	Bridgeport, Connecticut	1965	Milford, Connecticut	21,147	Nationwide
Togo's	San Jose, California	1971	San Jose, California	200	
Tubby's	St. Clair Shores, Michigan	1968	Clinton Township, Michigan	52	
Tudor's Biscuit World	Charleston, West Virginia	1980	Huntington, West Virginia		
West Coast Sourdough	Sacramento, California	2020	Sacramento, California	47	California, Tennessee
Which Wich?	Dallas, Texas	2003	Dallas, Texas	270	
Ike's Love & Sandwiches (restaurant)	San Francisco, California	2007		100+	Nationwide

== Seafood ==
Name	Original location	Founded	Headquarters	Number of U.S. location.	Areas served
Arthur Treacher's	Columbus, Ohio	1969	New York, New York	8	Ohio, New York, New Jersey, Connecticut
Captain D's	Nashville, Tennessee	1969	Nashville, Tennessee	536	Nationwide
H. Salt Esq. Fish & Chips	Sausalito, California	1965	California	10+	California
Long John Silver's	Lexington, Kentucky	1969	Louisville, Kentucky	641	Nationwide

== Casual dining ==
Casual dining restaurants below are split by the type of cuisine they serve.

=== American ===
Name	Original location	Founded	Headquarters	Number of U.S. locations	Areas served
Applebee's	Decatur, Georgia	1980	Glendale, California	1,455	Nationwide
Bakers Square	Nashville, Tennessee	1969	Des Moines, Iowa	7	Midwest
Beef O'Brady's	Brandon, Florida	1985	Brandon, Florida	133	Southeast, Midwest
Bennigan's	Atlanta, Georgia	1976	Dallas, Texas	42	East, Midwest
BJ's Restaurant (Note: Operates as BJ's Restaurant & Brewery, BJ's Restaurant & Brewhouse, BJ's Grill, and BJ's Pizza & Grill.)	Santa Ana, California	1978	Huntington Beach, California	212	Nationwide
Black Bear Diner	Mount Shasta, California	1995	Redding, California	144	West
Bob Evans Restaurant	Gallipolis, Ohio	1948	New Albany, Ohio	425	Mid-Atlantic, Midwest
Boomarang Diner	Muskogee, Oklahoma	1998	Shawnee, Oklahoma	61	Oklahoma, Arkansas
Cheddar's Scratch Kitchen	Arlington, Texas	1979	Orlando, Florida	187	Nationwide
The Cheesecake Factory (Note: 14 locations are branded as Grand Lux Cafe.)	Beverly Hills, California	1978	Calabasas, California	207	Nationwide
Chili's	Dallas, Texas	1975	Dallas, Texas	1,207	Nationwide
Coco's Bakery	Corona Del Mar, California	1948	Beaverton, Oregon	4	California
Cooper's Hawk Winery & Restaurant	Orland Park, Illinois	2005	Countryside, Illinois	54	Southeast, Midwest
Copeland's	New Orleans, Louisiana	1983		10	Southeast
Cracker Barrel	Lebanon, Tennessee	1969	Lebanon, Tennessee	657	Nationwide
Del Frisco's Grille				13	Nationwide
Denny's	Lakewood, California	1953	Spartanburg, South Carolina	1,288	Nationwide
Friendly's	Springfield, Massachusetts	1935	Wilbraham, Massachusetts	129	East Coast
Golden Corral	Fayetteville, North Carolina	1973	Raleigh, North Carolina	392	Nationwide
Gordon Biersch Brewery Restaurant	Palo Alto, California	1988		4	
Ground Round		1969	Freeport, Maine	4	
Hard Rock Cafe	London, England, U.K.	1971	Davie, Florida	35	Nationwide
Hash House A Go Go	San Diego, California	2000	San Diego, California	8	Southwest, Northeast, Florida
Hooters	Clearwater, Florida	1983	Atlanta, Georgia	420	Nationwide
Houlihan's	Kansas City, Missouri	1972	Leawood, Kansas	35	Nationwide
Houston's Restaurant (Note: Operates under 14 different names, with most branded as Houston's or Hillstone.)	Dallas, Texas	1977	Beverly Hills, California	38	Nationwide
Huddle House	Decatur, Georgia	1964	Atlanta, Georgia	305	Southeast
IHOP	Los Angeles, California	1958	Glendale, California	1,698	Nationwide
J. Alexander's	Nashville, Tennessee	1991	Nashville, Tennessee	44	
Karl Strauss Brewing Company	San Diego, California	1989		8	Southern California
Lazy Dog Restaurant & Bar	Huntington Beach, California	2003		40	West and Midwest
Max & Erma's	Columbus, Ohio	1972	Columbus, Ohio	7	Midwest, Pennsylvania
Marie Callender's	Orange, California	1964	Mission Viejo, California	25	California, Nevada, Utah
Metro Diner	Tampa, Florida	1992	Jacksonville, Florida	57	East Coast and Indiana
Norm's	Los Angeles, California	1949	Bellflower, California	24	Greater Los Angeles
O'Charley's	Nashville, Tennessee	1971	Nashville, Tennessee	156	Southeast and Midwest
The Original Pancake House	Portland, Oregon	1953	Portland, Oregon	144	Nationwide
Perkins Restaurant and Bakery	Cincinnati, Ohio	1958	Memphis, Tennessee	262	Nationwide
Planet Hollywood	New York, New York	1991	Orlando, Florida	4	
Pokeworks	New York City, New York	2015	Irvine, California	75	Nationwide
Rainforest Cafe	Bloomington, Minnesota	1994	Houston, Texas	17	Nationwide
Rock Bottom Restaurant & Brewery	Denver, Colorado	1991		11	
Ruby Tuesday	Knoxville, Tennessee	1972	Maryville, Tennessee	187	East (with isolated locations across the U.S. including Hawaii)
Ruby's Diner	Newport Beach, California	1982	Irvine, California	15	West, Texas, Mid-Atlantic
Russ' Restaurants	Holland, Michigan	1934	Holland, Michigan	12	West Michigan
Rusty Bucket Restaurant & Tavern	Dublin, Ohio	2002	Columbus, Ohio	23	Southeast and Midwest
Seasons 52	Orlando, Florida	2003	Orlando, Florida	44	Nationwide
Shari's Cafe & Pies	Hermiston, Oregon	1978	Beaverton, Oregon	95	West
Shoney's	Charleston, West Virginia	1947	Nashville, Tennessee	55	South, Mid-Atlantic, Midwest
Ted's Montana Grill	Columbus, Ohio	2002	Atlanta, Georgia	37	Nationwide
TGI Fridays	New York City, New York	1965	Dallas, Texas	84	Nationwide
Village Inn	Denver, Colorado	1959	Nashville, Tennessee	129	West, Midwest, and South
Waffle House	Avondale Estates, Georgia	1955	Norcross, Georgia	2,038	Nationwide

=== Asian/Asian fusion ===
Name	Original location	Founded	Headquarters	Number of U.S. locations	Areas served
Benihana	New York, New York	1964	Aventura, Florida	72	
Gen Korean BBQ	Tustin, California	2011	Cerritos, California	36	Western United States
HuHot Mongolian Grill	Missoula, Montana	1999	Missoula, Montana	70	Midwest and Mountain West
Kona Grill	Scottsdale, Arizona	1998	Scottsdale, Arizona	40	
Manila Sunset	Los Angeles, California	1985		7	Western United States
Nobu				19	
P.F. Chang's China Bistro	Scottsdale, Arizona	1993	Scottsdale, Arizona	209	Nationwide
Roy's	Honolulu, Hawaii	1988	Dallas, Texas	27	

=== Bar/brewpub ===
Name	Original location	Founded	Headquarters	Number of U.S. locations	Areas served
Bar Louie		1990	Addison, Texas	69	Nationwide
Champps	Saint Paul, Minnesota	1984	Dallas, Texas	6	Southeast, Midwest, East
HopCat	Grand Rapids, Michigan	2008	Grand Rapids, Michigan	17	Michigan
Miller's Ale House	Jupiter, Florida	1988	Orlando, Florida	97	East and Nevada
Twin Peaks	Lewisville, Texas	2008	Addison, Texas	87	South and Midwest
Yard House	Long Beach, California	1996	Orlando, Florida	81	Nationwide

=== Barbecue ===
Name	Original location	Founded	Headquarters	Number of U.S. locations	Areas served
Bill Miller Bar-B-Q		1953	San Antonio, Texas	76	Nationwide
Dickey's Barbecue Pit	Dallas, Texas	1941	Dallas, Texas	484	Nationwide
Famous Dave's	Hayward, Wisconsin	1994	Minnetonka, Minnesota	111	Nationwide
Lucille's Smokehouse Bar-B-Que	Signal Hill, California	1999	Long Beach, California	19	California, Nevada, Arizona
Pappas Bar-B-Q			Houston, Texas	19	
Red Hot & Blue	Memphis, Tennessee	1989	Winston-Salem, North Carolina	3	Maryland & Virginia
Rocklands Barbeque and Grilling Company	Washington, D.C.	1990	Washington, D.C.	4	Virginia & Washington, D.C.
Shane's Rib Shack	McDonough, Georgia	2002	Atlanta, Georgia	32	Southeast
Mission BBQ	Glen Burnie, Maryland	2011	Glen Burnie, Maryland	155	East Coast, Midwest
Sonny Bryan's Smokehouse	Dallas, Texas	1958	Dallas, Texas	3	Texas
Sonny's BBQ	Gainesville, Florida	1968	Maitland, Florida	92	Southeast
Tony Roma's	North Miami, Florida	1972	Orlando, Florida	7	California, Iowa, Montana, Nevada, North Carolina, Tennessee

=== Breakfast ===
Name	Original location	Founded	Headquarters	Number of U.S. locations	Areas served
First Watch	Pacific Grove, California	1983	University Park, Florida	435	

=== Cafeterias ===
Name	Original location	Founded	Headquarters	Number of U.S. locations	Areas served
Luby's	San Antonio, Texas	1947	Houston, Texas	38	Texas
MCL Restaurant & Bakery	Indianapolis, Indiana	1950	Indianapolis, Indiana	7	Indiana, Ohio
Piccadilly	Baton Rouge, Louisiana	1944	Baton Rouge, Louisiana	27	Southeast
S&S Cafeterias	Columbus, Georgia	1936	Macon, Georgia	5	Georgia, South Carolina

=== Caribbean ===
Name	Original location	Founded	Headquarters	Number of U.S. locations	Areas served
Bahama Breeze	Orlando, Florida	1996	Orlando, Florida	12	Florida, Georgia, North Carolina, South Carolina
Jimmy Buffett's Margaritaville	Key West, Florida	1977	Orlando, Florida	23	Nationwide

=== Chicken ===
Name	Original location	Founded	Headquarters	Number of U.S. locations	Areas served
Buffalo Wild Wings	Columbus, Ohio	1982	Sandy Springs, Georgia	1,212	Nationwide
Hooters	Clearwater, Florida	1983	Atlanta, Georgia	153	Nationwide
Hurricane Grill & Wings	Fort Pierce, Florida	1995	West Palm Beach, Florida	71	South, New York
WingHouse Bar & Grill	Largo, Florida	1994		28	

=== European ===
Name	Original location	Founded	Headquarters	Number of U.S. locations	Areas served
The Melting Pot	Maitland, Florida	1975	Tampa, Florida	95	Nationwide
Mimi's Cafe	Anaheim, California	1978	Dallas, Texas	42	Nationwide
Olga's Kitchen	Birmingham, Michigan	1970	Livonia, Michigan	24	Michigan

=== Hamburgers ===
Name	Original location	Founded	Headquarters	Number of U.S. locations	Areas served
Ford's Garage	Fort Myers, Florida	2012	Tampa, Florida	36	Midwest and Florida
Islands	Los Angeles, California	1982	Irvine, California	45	West and Hawaii
Johnny Rockets	Los Angeles, California	1986	Wilbraham, Massachusetts	126	Nationwide
Red Robin	Seattle, Washington	1969	Greenwood Village, Colorado	502	Nationwide
Wahlburgers	Hingham, Massachusetts	2011	Hingham, Massachusetts	50+	Nationwide

=== Mexican/Tex-Mex ===
Name	Original location	Founded	Headquarters	Number of U.S. locations	Areas served
Chevys Fresh Mex	Alameda, California	1986	Cypress, California	38	
Chuy's	Austin, Texas	1982	Austin, Texas	96	South and Midwest
El Cholo	Los Angeles, California	1923		7	Southern California
El Torito	Los Angeles, California	1954	Cypress, California	29	California
Pappasito's Cantina	Houston, Texas		Houston, Texas	25	Texas

=== Italian ===
Name	Original location	Founded	Headquarters	Number of U.S. locations	Areas served	Notes
Brio Tuscan Grill	Columbus, Ohio	1992	Columbus, Ohio	36	Nationwide	Also operates as Bravo! Cucina Italiana
Buca di Beppo	Minneapolis, Minnesota	1993	Orlando, Florida	70	Nationwide	
California Pizza Kitchen	Beverly Hills, California	1985	Los Angeles, California	169	Nationwide	
Carrabba's Italian Grill	Houston, Texas	1986	Tampa, Florida	203		
Johnny Carino's	Austin, Texas	1968	Austin, Texas	23		
Maggiano's Little Italy	Chicago, Illinois	1991	Dallas, Texas	50		
The Old Spaghetti Factory	Portland, Oregon	1969	Portland, Oregon	41		
Olive Garden	Orlando, Florida	1982	Orlando, Florida	876	Nationwide	
Romano's Macaroni Grill	Leon Springs, Texas	1988	Denver, Colorado	22		
Valentino's	Lincoln, Nebraska	1957	Lincoln, Nebraska	33	Nebraska, Kansas, South Dakota	

=== Pizza ===
Name	Original location	Founded	Headquarters	Number of U.S. locations	Areas served
Bertucci's	Somerville, Massachusetts	1981	Northborough, Massachusetts	12	Massachusetts, Delaware, Pennsylvania, Virginia
Giordano's	Chicago, Illinois	1974	Chicago, Illinois	56	Midwest, Colorado, Florida, Nevada, Washington, D.C.
Happy Joe's	Bettendorf, Iowa	1972	Bettendorf, Iowa	33	Midwest
LaRosa's Pizzeria	Cincinnati, Ohio	1954	Cincinnati, Ohio	60	Ohio, Kentucky, Indiana
Mellow Mushroom	Atlanta, Georgia	1974	Atlanta, Georgia	173	Southeast
Old Chicago Pizza & Taproom	Boulder, Colorado	1976	Houston, Texas	52	Nationwide
Rosati's	Chicago, Illinois	1926	Warrenville, Illinois	119	Nationwide
Rotolo's Pizzeria	Baton Rouge, Louisiana	1996	Baton Rouge, Louisiana	38	Southeast, Colorado
Shakey's Pizza	Sacramento, California	1954	Alhambra, California	43	California & Washington
Uno Pizzeria & Grill	Chicago, Illinois	1943	Boston, Massachusetts	36	Nationwide

=== Salad/vegan ===
Name	Original location	Founded	Headquarters	Number of U.S. locations	Areas served
Earth Burger	San Antonio	2014	San Antonio	4	Texas
Souper Salad	Houston, Texas	1978	Dallas, Texas	3	Southwest
WaBa Grill		2006		115	Southwestern United States

=== Seafood ===
Name	Original location	Founded	Headquarters	Number of U.S. locations	Areas served
The Boiling Crab	Garden Grove, California	2004	Garden Grove, California	28	Nationwide
Bonefish Grill	St. Petersburg, Florida	2000	Tampa, Florida	185	Nationwide
Bubba Gump Shrimp Company	Monterey, California	1996	Houston, Texas	23	Nationwide
Eddie V's Prime Seafood	Austin, Texas	2000	Orlando, Florida	26	Southwest, Texas, Florida
Joe's Crab Shack	Houston, Texas	1991	Houston, Texas	46	Nationwide
The Kickin' Crab	Santa Ana, California	2010	San Jose, California	40	West, Missouri, Georgia
Landry's Seafood	Katy, Texas	1980	Houston, Texas	20	
Legal Sea Foods	Cambridge, Massachusetts	1968	Boston, Massachusetts	26	Massachusetts, Rhode Island, Illinois, New Jersey, Virginia
McCormick & Schmick's	Portland, Oregon	1979	Houston, Texas	16	
Ocean Prime	Columbus, Ohio	1993	Columbus, Ohio	21	Nationwide
Pappadeaux Seafood Kitchen	San Antonio, Texas	1993	Houston, Texas	40	
Red Lobster	Lakeland, Florida	1968	San Francisco, California	670	Nationwide

=== Steakhouse ===
Name	Original location	Founded	Headquarters	Number of U.S. locations	Areas served
Black Angus Steakhouse	Los Altos, California	1964	Los Angeles, California	30	West
The Capital Grille	Providence, Rhode Island	1990	Orlando, Florida	73	Nationwide
Claim Jumper	Los Angeles, California	1977	Houston, Texas	8	West, Louisiana
Del Frisco's Double Eagle Steakhouse	New York City, New York	1981	Houston, Texas	15	
Fleming's Prime Steakhouse & Wine Bar	Newport Beach, California	1998	Tampa, Florida	64	
Fogo de Chão	Porto Alegre, Brazil	1979	Plano, Texas	48	
Logan's Roadhouse	Lexington, Kentucky	1991	Nashville, Tennessee	136	
LongHorn Steakhouse	Atlanta, Georgia	1981	Orlando, Florida	551	
Montana Mike's					
Morton's The Steakhouse	Chicago, Illinois	1978	Houston, Texas	55	Nationwide
Outback Steakhouse	Tampa, Florida	1988	Tampa, Florida	694	Nationwide
The Palm	New York, New York	1926	Houston, Texas	17	
Ponderosa Bonanza Steakhouses	Kokomo, Indiana Westport, Connecticut	1963 1965	Plano, Texas	15	
Ruth's Chris Steak House	New Orleans, Louisiana	1965	Winter Park, Florida	129	
Saltgrass Steak House	Houston, Texas	1991	Houston, Texas	96	Nationwide
Sizzler	Culver City, California	1958	Mission Viejo, California	86	
Stonefire Grill	Valencia, California	2000	Agoura Hills, California	12	Southern California
Texas de Brazil	Addison, Texas	1998	Dallas, Texas	64	Nationwide
Texas Roadhouse	Clarksville, Indiana	1993	Louisville, Kentucky	596	Nationwide
Western Sizzlin'	Augusta, Georgia	1962	Roanoke, Virginia	54	

== Arcade and game centers ==
Name	Original location	Founded	Headquarters	Number of U.S. locations	Areas served
Chuck E. Cheese	San Jose, California	1977	Irving, Texas	477	Nationwide
Dave & Busters	Dallas, Texas	1982	Dallas, Texas	142	Nationwide
Peter Piper Pizza	Glendale, Arizona	1973	Phoenix, Arizona	95	Arizona, California, New Mexico, Texas
Round1 Bowling & Amusement	Osaka, Japan	1980	Osaka, Japan	60+	Nationwide
Topgolf	Watford, England, United Kingdom	2000	Dallas, Texas	102	Nationwide

== Defunct ==
- Beefsteak Charlie's
- Bikinis Sports Bar & Grill
- Bill Knapp's
- Bugaboo Creek Steakhouse
- Burger Chef
- Camille's Sidewalk Cafe (Note: Two locations still exist.)
- Carrows Restaurants
- Cheeseburger in Paradise
- Chi Chi's
- Chicken in the Rough
- Druther's (Note: One location still exists.)
- ESPN Zone
- Fresh Choice
- Furr's
- Good Earth
- Hamburger Hamlet
- Henry's Hamburgers (Note: One location still exists.)
- Horne's
- Hot 'n Now (Note: Two locations still exist.)
- K&W Cafeterias
- Koo Koo Roo
- Lone Star Steakhouse & Saloon (Note: One location still exists.)
- Lyon's
- Morrison's Cafeteria (Note: One location still exists.)
- Naugles (Note: One location still exists.)
- On the Border Mexican Grill & Cantina
- Pizza Fusion
- Royal Castle (Note: One location still exists.)
- Red Barn
- Sambo's (Note: One (renamed) location still exists.)
- ShopHouse Southeast Asian Kitchen
- Smokey Bones
- ShowBiz Pizza Place
- Steak and Ale (Note: One location still exists.)
- Sweet Tomatoes/Souplantation (Note: One location still exists.)
- Trump Burger
- Yogi Bear's Honey Fried Chicken (Note: One location still exists.)
- York Steak House (Note: One location still exists.)
- Zoës Kitchen

== See also ==
- List of coffeehouse chains
- List of ice cream parlor chains
- List of pizza chains
- List of restaurant chains
- List of revolving restaurants
- Lists of restaurants
- List of defunct restaurants of the United States
