= Pokeworks =

American fast-casual restaurant chain

- Type: Private
- Industry: Fast casual restaurants
- Founded: 2015; 11 years ago in Midtown Manhattan, New York City
- Founders: Michael Wu, Peter Yang, Kevin Hsu, Kasper Hsu, Michael Chen, and others
- Headquarters: Irvine, California, U.S.
- Number of locations: 80+ (2026)
- Products: Poke bowls, poke burritos, salads
- Website: pokeworks.com

Pokeworks is an American fast-casual restaurant chain specializing in Hawaiian-inspired poke. First opening in December 2015 in New York City, its corporate headquarters are in Irvine, California, and operates more than 80 locations in the United States, Canada, and Taiwan through a primarily franchised model.

== History ==
Pokeworks was created by eight people, including brothers Michael Wu and Peter Yang, their college friends Kevin Hsu and Kasper Hsu, and Michael Chen, who sought to bring Hawaiian poke to the mainland United States as a customizable fast-casual concept.

The company started franchising in 2016 and expanded into Boston, Chicago, Houston, San Francisco, Phoenix, Miami, Philadelphia, Atlanta, and Austin. In 2018, Pokeworks received an investment from Toridoll Holdings, a Tokyo-based restaurant company, to fund expansion.

In March 2021, the company hired several outside executives, including former Veggie Grill CEO Steve Heeley as chief marketing officer and later CEO. Heeley was promoted to chief executive officer in August 2021, succeeding co-founder Michael Wu, who became head of culinary.

Under Heeley, the chain began expanding internationally, opening locations in Mexico, Taiwan, and Canada. In 2023, Heeley was replaced by Regina Cheung who was previously chief financial officer.

By 2026, Pokeworks operated more than 80 restaurants across 22 U.S. states as well as locations in Canada and Taiwan, and announced plans for further expansion in Texas.

== See also ==
- Poke (dish)
- Hawaiian cuisine
- List of restaurant chains in the United States
