= Bartaco =

American restaurant chain

bartaco
- Founded: 2010; 16 years ago
- Founder: Scott Lawton; Andy Pforzheimer; Sasa Mahr-Batuz
- Headquarters: Arlington, Virginia
- Number of locations: 31 restaurants (2025)
- Key people: Anthony Valletta (CEO)
- Parent: L Catterton
- Website: bartaco.com

Bartaco, stylized as bartaco, is an American restaurant chain company which focuses on upscale street-style food.

Founded in 2010 by Scott Lawton, Andy Pforzheimer, and Sasa Mahr-Batuz, the restaurant currently operates in 31 locations in 13 states, mostly along the East Coast of the US. The restaurant's first location opened in Port Chester, New York.

In 2019, bartaco was acquired when private equity firm L Catterton purchased Del Frisco's Restaurant Group for $650 million. Bartaco is being run as a separate business under the firm's ownership, alongside Barcelona Wine Bar.

== Concept and menu ==
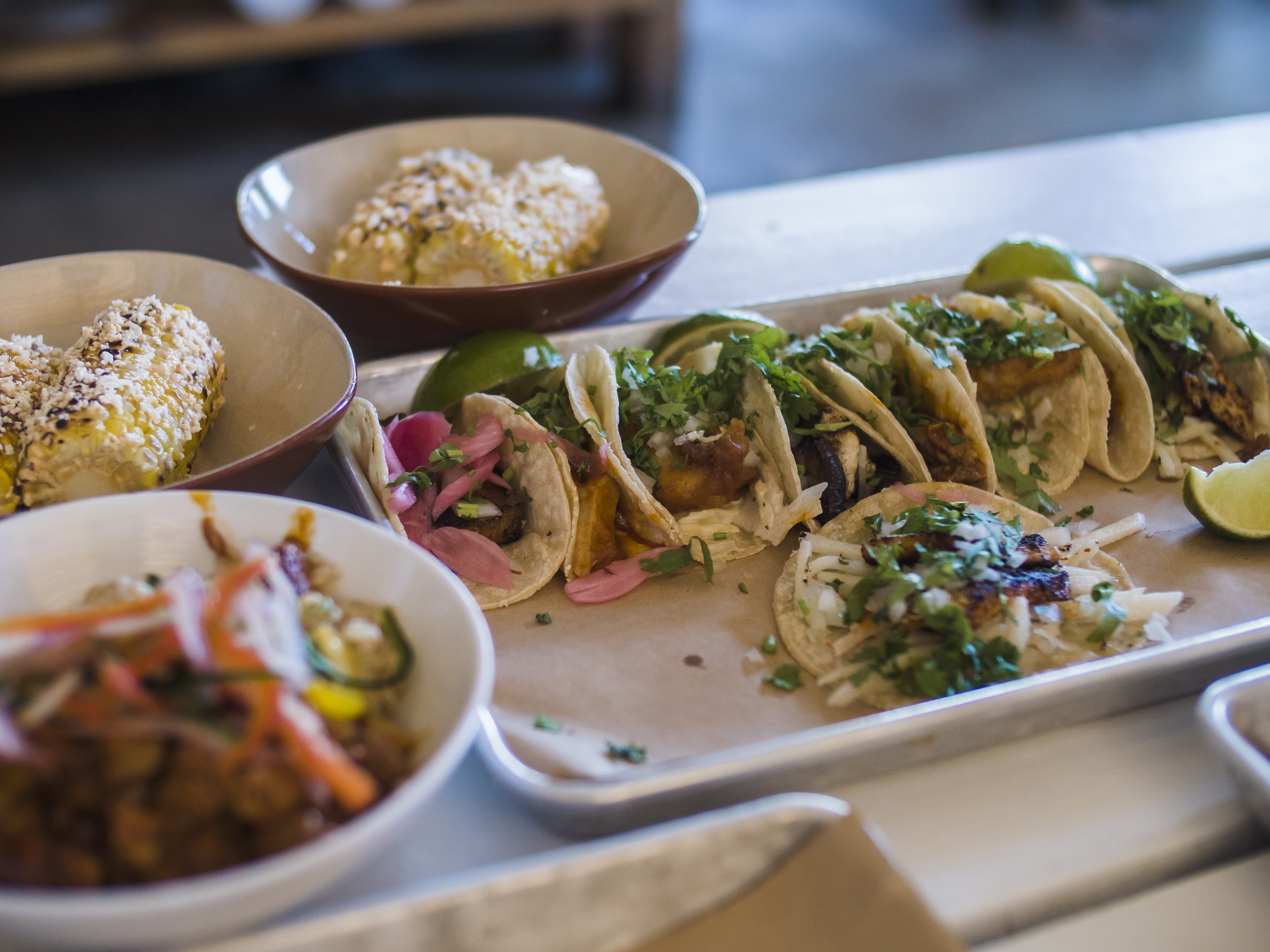
An assortment of tacos and side dishes at bartaco

Bartaco uses an ordering system where guests mark small-plate orders and submit them in rounds, signaling staff with a table card rather than continuous table service. Guests complete menu slips incrementally, and dishes are delivered as they’re prepared, encouraging a grazing format over traditional coursing. Menu offerings emphasize small tacos and Latin-inspired sides, with options ranging from wild boar and Baja-style fish to sweet plantains and house-made guacamole, presented in individual portions.

== See also ==
- Taco
- Margarita
- Mexican cuisine
