= Next Level Burger =

Fast-food restaurant chain

Restaurant information
- Established: 2014

Next Level Burger is a restaurant chain. Based in Bend, Oregon, the restaurant serves plant-based fast food.

The business acquired Veggie Grill. Next Level and Veggie Grill are the largest wholly owned plant-based chains in the U.S.

Matthew de Gruyter is a co-founder and the chief executive officer.

== Description ==
Next Level Burger serves plant-based fast food. The menu includes burgers, French fries, and milkshakes with a coconut or soy milk base. Burger options include the All-American, which has tempeh bacon, cheddar or Swiss-style "cheese", and egg-free mayonnaise, as well as the Brunch Burger, the Sausage Bacon, and the Signature, which has a patty made from umami mushroom and quinoa, avocado, and mayonnaise with garlic and thyme. Next Level has also served a Chili Chz Dog, salads, and sandwiches. Among milkshake varieties are Cookies N' Cream and Mint Chocolate Chip.

== History and locations ==
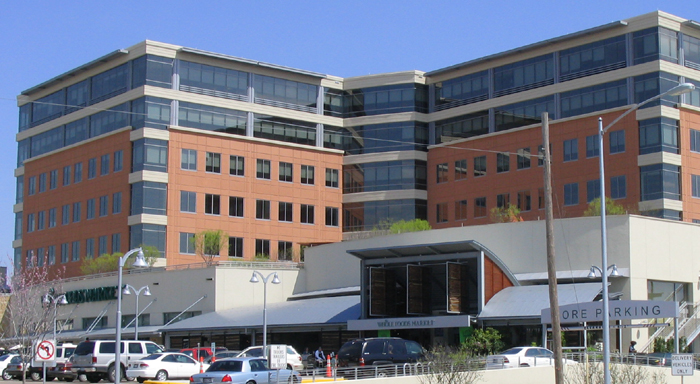
In Texas, Next Level Burger operates at the flagship Whole Foods Market in Austin.

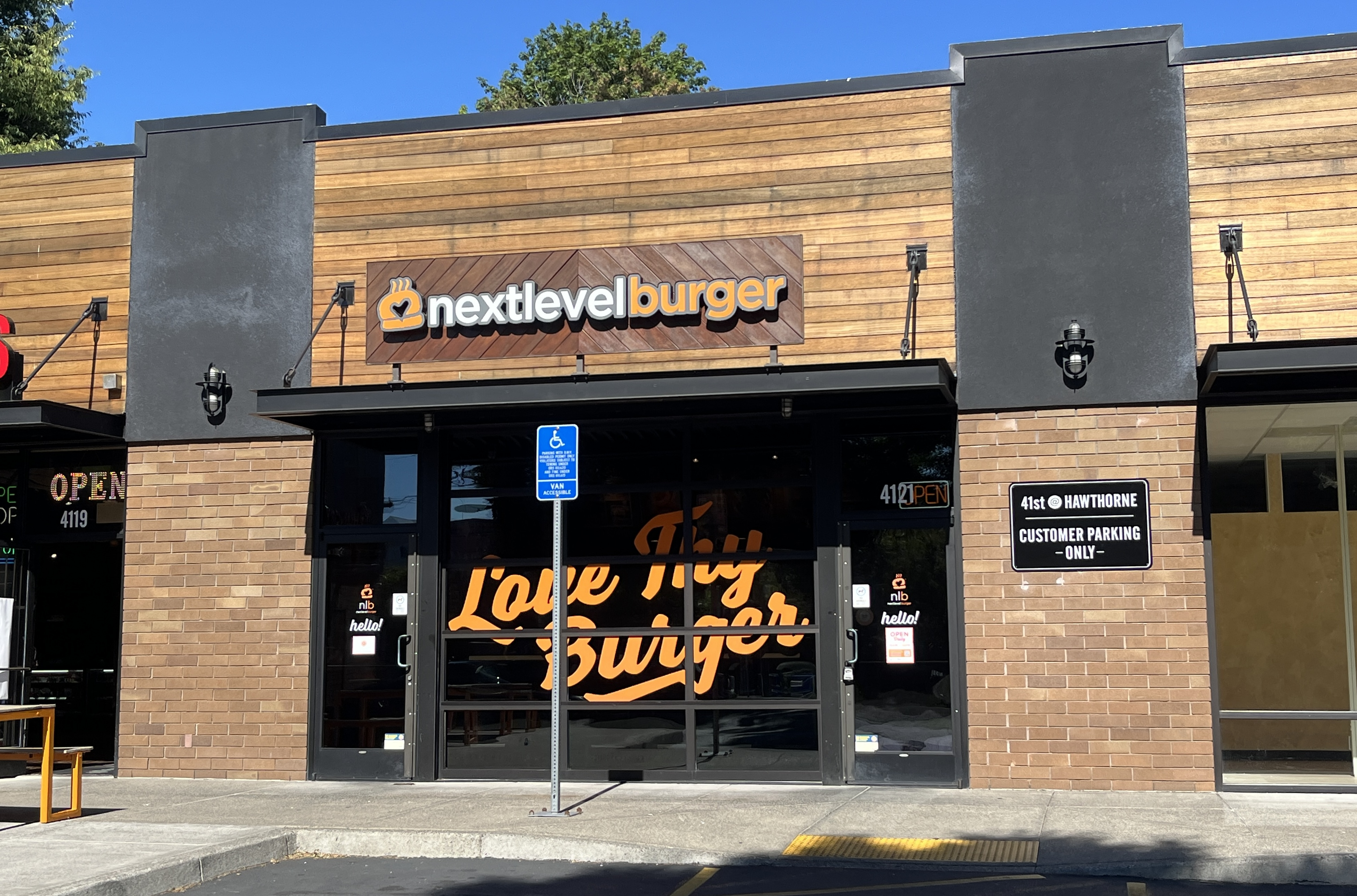
Exterior of a restaurant in Portland, Oregon, 2025

Next Level Burger was established by Matt and Cierra de Gruyter in 2014. As of 2022, there were nine locations. In addition to Oregon, the business operates in the U.S. states of California, Colorado, New York, Texas, and Washington.

In Portland, Oregon, the restaurant on Hawthorne Boulevard in southeast Portland opened in 2015. The West Burnside Street location opened in April 2022, then closed in May 2025 citing ongoing security concerns. Next Level also operates in Lake Oswego, Oregon.

In Washington, a Next Level location opened in Seattle's Roosevelt neighborhood in 2017. As of October 2018, Next Level was slated to open in the city's Ballard neighborhood in December.

In 2018, Next Level announced plans to open in the flagship location of Whole Foods Market in Austin, Texas.

In New York, Next Level operates in Fort Greene, Brooklyn.

In California, Next Level has operated in Concord. The first location in San Francisco opened in August 2018.

Colorado's first restaurant opened in Denver in 2022.

== Reception ==
In a 2016 review for Willamette Week, Martin Cizmar complimented the chocolate shake with a coconut milk base and the pumpkin spice shake with a soybase. He wrote that the chili cheese fries "was exactly the sort of comforting, classic junk-food dish I could imagine vegans searching out". After trying four of Next Level's six burger patty options across three visits, Cizmar said "none managed to transcend the supermarket Gardenburger". He opined, "The house's soy-based burger patty is dry and cooked cleanly, in a manner that leaves you without much to remember it by."

== See also ==
- Fast-food restaurant
- List of restaurant chains in the United States
- List of vegetarian and vegan restaurants
