= Trump Burger =

Defunct restaurant chain in the U.S. state of Texas

Restaurant information
- Location: Texas, United States

Trump Burger was a regional restaurant chain in the U.S. state of Texas. The Donald Trump–themed restaurant was established by Roland Beainy in Bellville in 2020. There were also locations in Bay City, Flatonia, and Greater Houston.

The Kemah location, which opened in March 2025, was also known as MAGA Burger. The menu included burgers, sandwiches, and French fries.

The chain has received multiple lawsuits related to the business ownership, as well as a cease-and-desist letter from the Trump Organization.

In August 2025, Immigration and Customs Enforcement (ICE) agents arrested the chain's founder, Roland Beainy, a Lebanese national. He was charged with overstaying in the U.S. under the terms of his visa. In October 2025, it was reported that all Trump Burger locations had closed. By March 2026, all locations had changed their names.

== See also ==
- List of defunct restaurants of the United States
- List of hamburger restaurants
- List of restaurant chains in the United States
