= Rosa's Cafe =

American authentic Tex-Mex restaurant chain

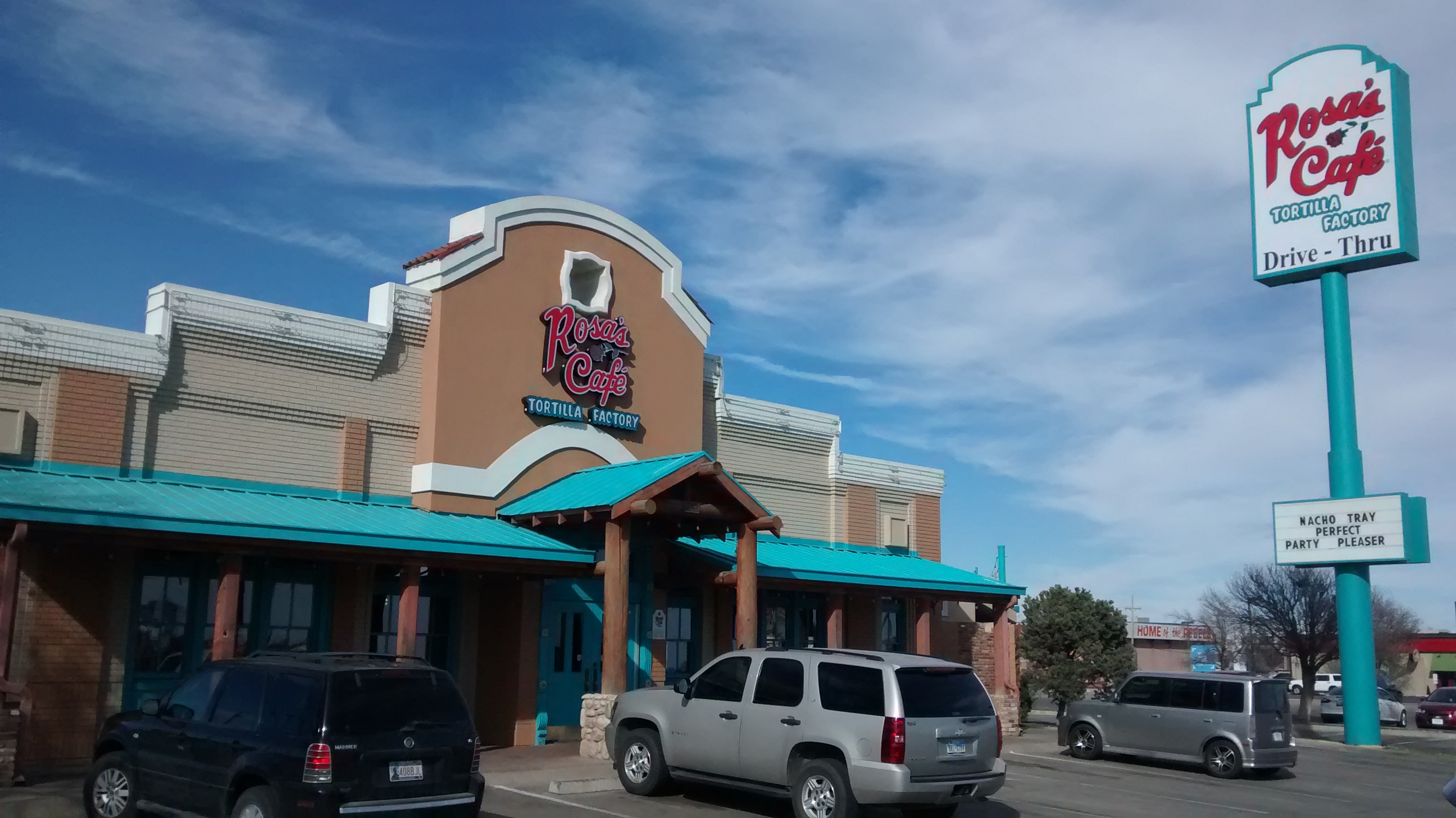
- The exterior of a Rosa's Cafe and Tortilla Factory in Amarillo, Texas
- Company type: Wholly owned subsidiary
- Industry: Tex-Mex restaurant
- Founded: 1983; 42 years ago in San Angelo, Texas, United States
- Headquarters: Fort Worth, Texas, United States
- Number of locations: 51 (2022)
- Area served: California, New Mexico, Texas
- Parent: Bobby Cox Companies
- Website: rosascafe.com

Rosa's Cafe is an American authentic Tex-Mex fast-casual restaurant chain with beginnings in West Texas. Rosa's has expanded to 47 locations across Texas. Additionally, there is a restaurant in Hobbs, New Mexico and Temecula, California. The restaurants are well known for their "Tuesdays Were Made for Tacos" promotion.

The first Rosa's Cafe opened in San Angelo, Texas, in 1983. Rosa's Cafe was purchased by the Bobby Cox Companies in 1995. The Bobby Cox Companies also owns the restaurant chains Taco Villa and Texas Burger, as well as several non-restaurant ventures. Their signature dish is chicken and beef fajitas, and sour cream chicken enchiladas.
