= Bumpers Drive-In =

Fast food restaurant chain

Bumpers Drive-In of America
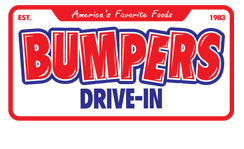
- Trade name: Bumpers Drive-In
- Company type: Private
- Industry: Restaurants Franchising
- Genre: Quick service
- Founded: 1983; 43 years ago Brookhaven, Mississippi
- Founder: S.L. Sethi
- Headquarters: Canton, Mississippi, U.S.
- Number of locations: 30
- Area served: Mississippi; Tennessee
- Website: bumpersdrivein.com

Bumpers Drive-In of America (more commonly referred to as Bumpers), is a regional fast food restaurant chain located in Mississippi and Tennessee. The chain mostly operates in small towns.

== History ==
Bumpers Drive In was founded in 1983, in Brookhaven, Mississippi by Delta State University professor S.L. Sethi. During the late 1970s, Sethi owned a Sonic franchise. Fast food chains at that time favored procedures that sacrificed quality in the name of variety and efficiency. Frozen hamburger patties and powdered milk shake bases were commonplace. The entire industry experienced unprecedented growth. Wanting to serve high quality fresh food, Sethi opened his first Bumpers store in Brookhaven.

== See also ==
- Ward's, another Mississippi-based fast-food hamburger restaurant
- List of hamburger restaurants
