= Maryland Fried Chicken =

American fast food restaurant chain

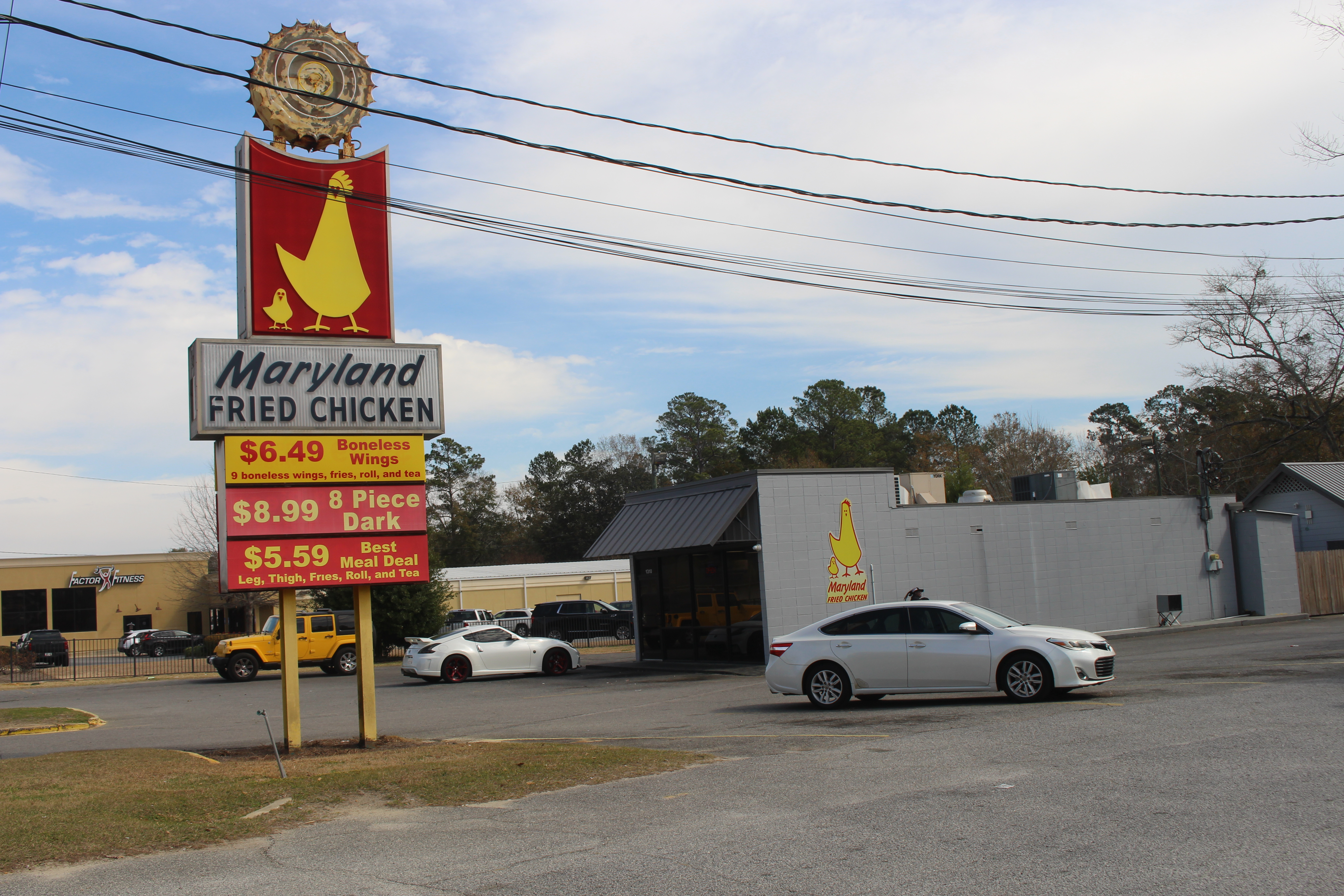
- Maryland Fried Chicken in Thomasville, GA
- Industry: Restaurants
- Genre: Fast food restaurant
- Founded: July 14, 1961; 65 years ago Orlando, Florida, U.S.
- Founder: Al Constantine
- Defunct: December 5, 1979
- Fate: Dissolved, but stores still operating in South Carolina, Michigan, Georgia, & Florida.
- Successor: The Shrimper Seafood & Maryland Fried Chicken (South Carolina, 1976-present); Mr. C's Southern Fried Chicken (Florida, 1979-1988); The Original Maryland Fried Chicken (Georgia; 1997-present); Original Maryland Fried Chicken (Florida, 2005-present)
- Headquarters: Orlando, Florida, U.S. (1961-1970); Macon, Georgia, U.S. (1967-1979)
- Number of locations: 160 (1971); 30 (2023)
- Area served: Currently: Florida; Georgia; Michigan; South Carolina; Formerly: Alabama; Colorado; Illinois; Louisiana; Mississippi; New England; New Jersey; New York; North Carolina; Pennsylvania; Tennessee; Texas; Virginia; Bahamas
- Key people: Al Constantine; Angelo Costantine; Richard Costantine; J. R. Miller
- Products: Fried chicken; Fish; Shrimp; Coleslaw; Gizzards; Soft drinks; Okra; Liver; Clams
- Parent: First Macon Corp. (1967-1970)

Maryland Fried Chicken is a group of independently owned restaurants and former corporate chain of franchised fried chicken take-out restaurants that originated in Orlando, Florida. It was founded by Al Constantine in 1961 and grew to cover some 20 U.S. states and the Bahamas at its peak before ultimately going bankrupt in the late 1970s and dissolving as a chain.

== Nomenclature ==
Accounts differ on the selection of the name "Maryland Fried Chicken" for the Orlando-based chain of restaurants founded by Delaware natives. In a 1970 interview, Richard Costantine, the brother of founder Al Constantine, reported that it was their father, Alfonzo, who chose the name "Maryland." He offered only that it was believed to sound more appealing than "Delaware Fried Chicken" or "Delmarva Fried Chicken."

However, commenting for a 2001 article, Al Constantine took credit for the name and claimed that it was chosen due to the then-recent opening of a Glenn L. Martin Co. manufacturing plant in Orlando. Martin had previously built an aircraft manufacturing facility near Baltimore, Maryland that at one time was the largest such facility in the world. A number of Baltimore natives came with the company to its new Orlando facility and frequented Constantine's Restaurant; thus, the "Maryland" name was devised to appeal to these customers.

== History ==
=== Background and early history ===
Al Constantine, a 2nd generation immigrant from Italy, originally lived in Wilmington, Delaware, where he and his family operated "The Dinner Bell" restaurant that his father had founded. Gradually, the Constantine family moved to Orlando, Florida and opened a new 24-hour diner called Constantine's Restaurant in 1959. In 1960, members of the family noticed the popularity of an early Kentucky Fried Chicken franchise in Florida and set out to compete with them. Al Constantine experimented with fried chicken recipes and settled on a blend of 21 herbs and spices for the breading mix, while cooking the chicken in pure peanut oil using a pressure fryer. After handing out free samples for some time to gauge customer reactions, Al's "Maryland Fried Chicken" was added to the menu at Constantine's Restaurant and a 35-foot sign advertising the new product was erected outside the diner.

The first restaurant to operate solely under the name Maryland Fried Chicken opened in Fern Park, Florida as a joint venture between Al Constantine and a business partner, W. H. Truesdell. This new restaurant opened on October 4, 1961, and featured a limited menu in contrast to the wider offerings of Constantine's Restaurant. Additional MFC locations opened thereafter under franchise agreements.

=== First incorporation ===
Maryland Fried Chicken was incorporated in the state of Florida on Feb. 15th, 1963. Al Constantine acted as president of the corporation; his brother Richard was treasurer; his brother Angelo "Angel" was vice president; and their parents served as directors. The chain grew to 55 units by October 1967, all in the state of Florida. Al Constantine was actively pursuing avenues of expansion to other states as well as internationally; he had conducted an "extensive market feasibility study" in multiple Western European nations and MFC, Inc. was working with prospective franchisees in the states of Georgia and Alabama.

=== Maryland Fried Chicken of America ===
Maryland Fried Chicken, Inc. was approached by Georgia businessman J. R. Miller in 1967 with an offer of $100,000 to become the national franchising agent for MFC. With this deal, a new company called Maryland Fried Chicken of America, Inc. was established as a subsidiary of Miller's own business, First Macon Corporation. MFC of America would spearhead the restaurant chain's nationwide expansion program, while Al Constantine's Maryland Fried Chicken, Inc. would continue to operate independently and manage the extant restaurants in Florida. MFC of America made a "firm commitment" upon signing the deal to open a minimum of 500 outlets nationally within five years.

The first franchises to open under Maryland Fried Chicken of America were operational in Georgia, Alabama, and Michigan by the end of 1967. Over the following two years, MFC of America established a national headquarters in Macon, Georgia, complete with a franchise training college, and negotiated hundreds of franchise agreements across a dozen U.S. states. In 1969, Maryland Fried Chicken claimed to be the third-largest and fastest-growing fried chicken take-out chain in the United States.

=== Second Incorporation and Downfall ===
By late 1969, Florida-based Maryland Fried Chicken, Inc. and Georgia-based Maryland Fried Chicken of America, Inc. were in talks to merge. At the time, MFC, Inc. operated 67 units in Florida and Louisiana and MFC of America operated 49 units across many states; the combined company would have 116 locations across 16 states with 134 additional franchises pending construction. First Macon Corp. would pay $1.3 million and own 40% of the combined company. Al Constantine and J. R. Miller jointly announced that the merger had been completed on Feb. 23rd, 1970, and the resulting company was a Delaware-based firm called Maryland Fried Chicken, Inc. that maintained executive offices in Macon, GA. Al Constantine remained president of the firm, while his brother, Angelo, and mother, Rose, each became a vice president, and J. R. Miller became chairman.

Following the merger, Maryland Fried Chicken began offering franchises in new regions including New England. By early 1971, the chain boasted 160 locations. However, Al Constantine stepped down as president of the company in 1971 as financial problems forced dozens of store closures; by late 1972, only 102 stores remained, though the new president of MFC, Alan Parker, claimed then that the business had returned to profitability. Nevertheless, as the 1970s Recession was ongoing, MFC, Inc. suffered a number of legal defeats stemming from unpaid loans, and ultimately the company dissolved in 1979 following a bankruptcy filing.

=== Successor Entities ===
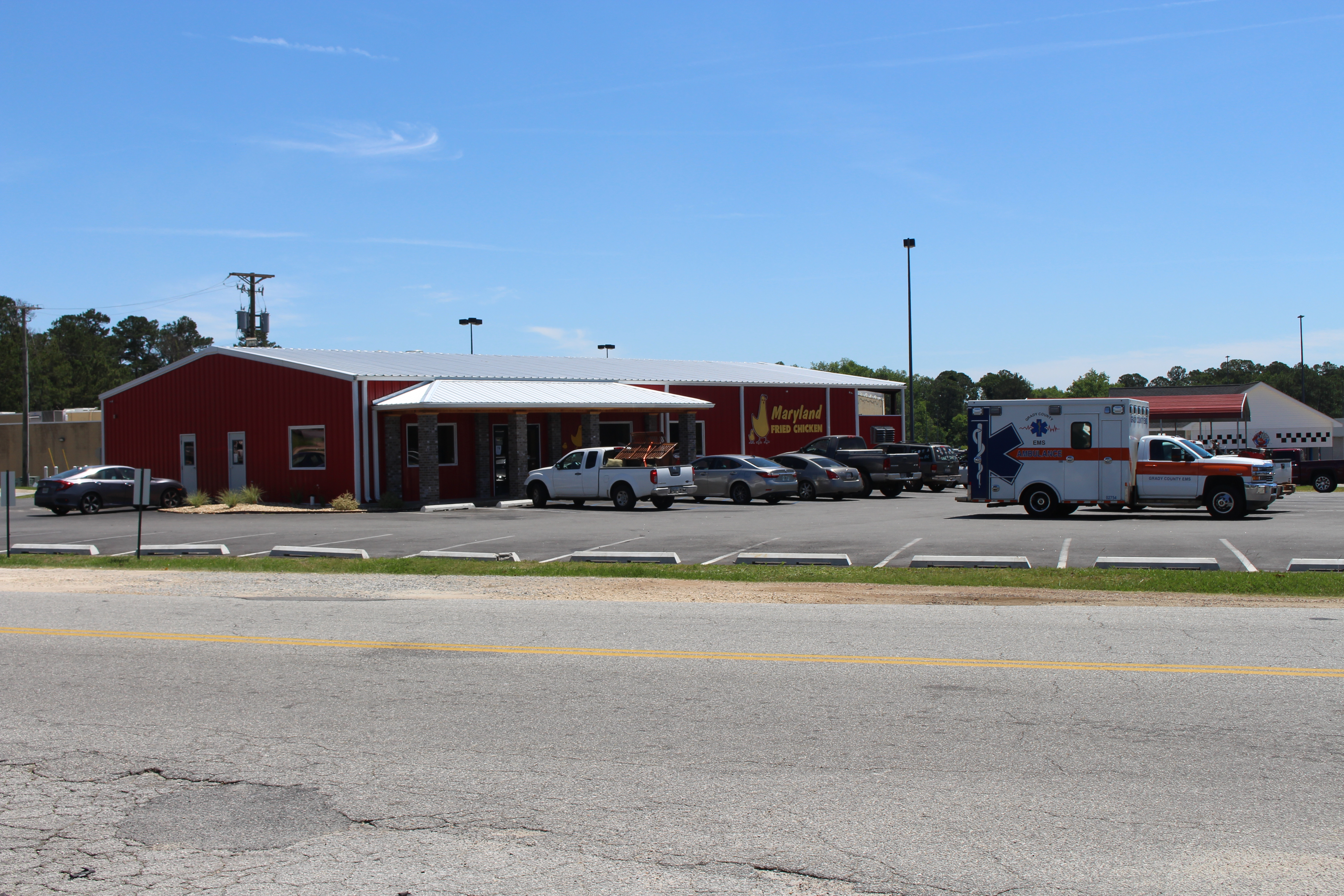
Maryland Fried Chicken in Cairo, Georgia in 2020

Following the dissolution of MFC, Inc., the remaining franchises began to operate independently. In addition to the remaining MFC-branded franchises, a few distinct successor businesses emerged:

- The Shrimper Seafood & Maryland Fried Chicken is a combination of Maryland Fried Chicken and The Shrimper Seafood, both pre-existing restaurant chains. The first combined location opened in 1976 in a former MFC restaurant in Florence, South Carolina. At present, the chain has 4 locations, all in South Carolina.
- Mr. C's Southern Fried Chicken was founded in 1979 by Al Constantine in a former Maryland Fried Chicken restaurant in Sanford, Florida. Constantine claimed that MFC had changed the chicken recipe after he left the company, and that Mr. C's would offer his original recipe, with the intent to open additional locations. Constantine later sold the restaurant, which then closed following a 1988 armed robbery that left its new owner stabbed to death.
- The Original Maryland Fried Chicken was trademarked by Edith Swain, the owner of a MFC restaurant in Waycross, Georgia, in 1997. This occurred after Al Constantine assigned his entire interest in his Maryland Fried Chicken federal trademark registration to Swain in 1995. Today, there are two stores doing business as "The Original Maryland Fried Chicken."
- Original Maryland Fried Chicken is a chain of modern MFC restaurants in Florida, founded in 2005 by Bob Costantine with the written blessing of his uncle, Al Constantine. Bob is also the owner of an OMFC-branded restaurant in Apopka, Florida, while his brothers Mike and Tony Costantine own an OMFC franchise in Leesburg, Florida. Although there were previously several other OMFC locations, only the two aforementioned ones remain.

== Celebrity Franchisees ==
Notable sports figures Dan Sikes, Press Maravich, and Bear Bryant joined forces to become a major franchisee across the South. Together, the three had franchise rights in Florida, Louisiana, Alabama, Mississippi, and Tennessee, and operated 24 outlets as of June of 1969. Sikes styled himself the "Chicken Baron" of Florida and planned to open 50 "Dan Sikes Maryland Fried Chicken" outlets in his home state of Florida. Sikes commented on the fierce competition he faced, saying "the fried chicken business is all right [sic], there's just too many people in it."

Separately, Georgia football star Theron Sapp opened three MFC outlets in Augusta, Georgia after retiring from the NFL; he later sold two of them off to focus on just one store downtown. Sapp commented on the difficulty he faced to make the business a success at times, but also attributed his comfortable retirement and the luxuries he was able to pass to his children and grandchildren to his Maryland Fried Chicken restaurant. Sapp, who called fried chicken his favorite meal, operated the downtown MFC for 35 years before retiring, and the restaurant remains open to this day.
