= Rocklands Barbeque and Grilling Company =

American restaurant chain

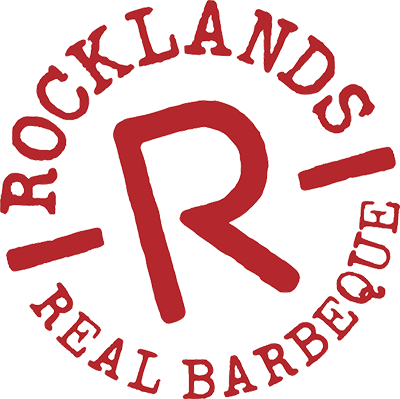
- Company type: Private
- Industry: Foodservice
- Founded: 1990; 35 years ago
- Founder: John Snedden
- Headquarters: Washington, D.C.
- Number of locations: 4 (2024)
- Area served: Virginia; Washington, D.C.
- Owner: John Snedden
- Number of employees: 75 (1998)
- Website: rocklands.com

Rocklands Barbeque and Grilling Company is an American restaurant chain based in Washington, D.C., primarily serving barbecued dishes. As of 2024, it has four locations in two states. The company also operates food trucks and provides catering. It is one of the most prominent barbecue chains on the East Coast.

== History ==
The first location was opened on December 1, 1990, in Glover Park, D.C., by John Snedden, who had previously helped barbecue pigs for locals when he attended Washington and Lee University. He created the signature sauce in 1978 and named it Rocklands, after the farm where he lived. Snedden moved to D.C. in 1983 and began a catering business in 1987. In 1995, it opened its second location in Ballston, Virginia, which closed in 2007. The chain opened restaurants in Capital One Arena and Nationals Park in 2018 and 2019, respectively.

== Menu ==
The chain has an extensive menu, which includes, ribs, chicken, macaroni and cheese, baked beans, cornbread, buffalo wings, barbecue sauce, pulled pork, pit beef, Italian sausage, vegetable sandwiches, grilled salmon/catfish, pork belly, brisket, hot dogs, veggie burgers, salads, coleslaw, potato salad, corn pudding, mashed potatoes, collard, french fries, onion rings, hushpuppies, iced tea, lemonade, and root beer.

== Locations ==
Rocklands Barbeque has four locations in Virginia and Washington, D.C. In Virginia, it has restaurants in Alexandria and Arlington, while there are locations in the Glover Park neighborhood of D.C. and the Nationals Park stadium.
