= 7 Leaves Cafe =

American Vietnamese cafe chain

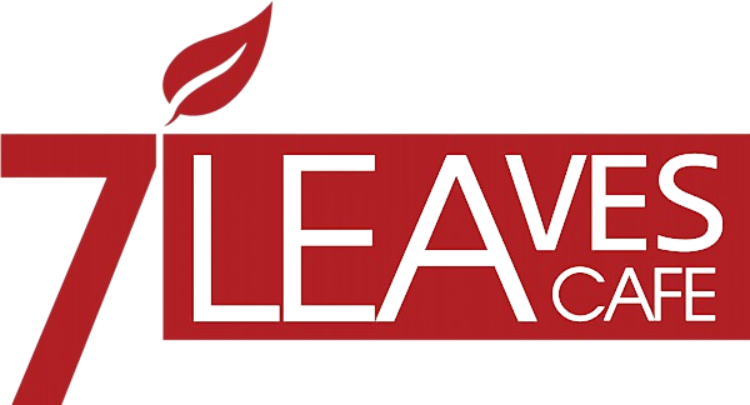

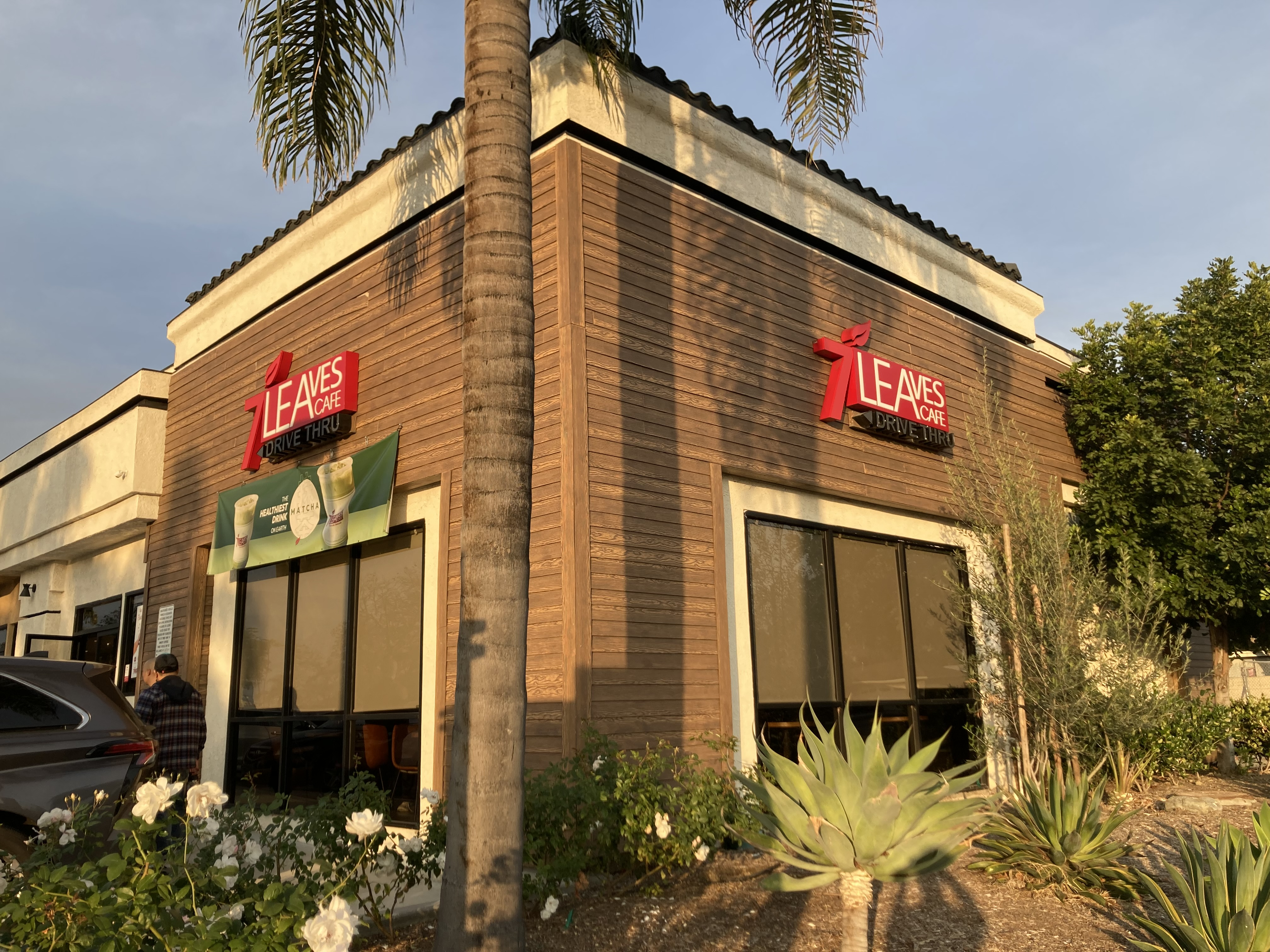
- A location in Covina, California
- Industry: Food and Beverage
- Founded: 2011; 15 years ago in Westminster, California
- Number of locations: 43
- Areas served: California; Georgia; Nevada; Texas
- Key people: Vinh Nguyen (co-founder); Quang Nguyen (co-founder); Son Nguyen (co-founder); Ha Nguyen (co-founder); Mai Ly (co-founder); Denny Ly (co-founder); Triet Ho (co-founder)
- Brands: Artisan (in collaboration with Crema Bakery)
- Number of employees: 700 (2019)
- Website: 7leavescafe.com

7 Leaves Cafe is an American chain of retailers selling Vietnamese drinks and macarons. It is mainly based around the Southwestern United States. As of 2026, the cafe has 43 locations across the U.S. Most ingredients used at the store are pressed by hand. It sells over 1 million drinks every quarter, and some popular stores sell more than 3,000 drinks daily. The chain has been nicknamed "the Asian Starbucks" by both employees and customers.

== History ==
The cafe began in a 1,100 square feet (100 m^{2}) store in a small Westminster, California shopping mall with four brothers, Vinh, Quang, Son, (known as Sonny) and Ha, with backgrounds in IT, software engineering, banking, and law, respectively. The chain opened another shop in Garden Grove and expanded across California and the Southwestern United States. Their parents had left Vietnam in the 1990s after the Vietnam War, and the brothers fled earlier in 1983. However, the boat they escaped on ran out of gas, staying adrift for seven days until rescuers from a refugee settlement in Palawan found them. The business was originally kept secret from their parents as they would not want their successful sons pursuing a risky career in retail, but the siblings' father, Chanh, found out after seeing the fifth store while plumbing was being constructed there.

Quang was the brother who came up with the idea, after watching a street vendor in Bangkok making Thai tea and having great success. Quang also went to Vietnam and explored many of its districts, attempting to find the best iced coffee there, and deciding to bring it to the U.S. Back in America, Quang answered an ad looking for a restaurant lease, also recruiting his then-girlfriend Mai Ly, her younger brother Denny Ly, and his childhood friend Triet Ho.

The name "7 Leaves" comes from the seven ingredients used in the chain's popular herbal tea, along with the number of co-founders.

=== Artisan ===
Artisan is a partnership between 7 Leaves Cafe and Crema Bakery in Fountain Valley, in which drinks from the cafe are served alongside dishes from the bakery in a 3,000 square feet (280 m^{2}) brunchlike setting, with decorations being reminiscent of an invitation to a friend's house. The restaurant opened in 2021.

== Products ==
The chain is known for its variety of teas served cold, which include Thai, milk, soy, matcha, jasmine, herbal, and hibiscus. It also has a broad selection of coffees — Vietnamese, house, and black. Grass jelly, Aloe vera, boba, and custard pudding can be added onto the drinks themselves. The store additionally sells macarons, coming in eight flavors.

== Locations ==
The chain has locations in Orange County, Los Angeles County, San Bernardino County, Santa Clara County, Riverside County, Las Vegas, Phoenix, Houston, Dallas, and a satellite store in Duluth, Georgia.

In Southern California, the cafe is popular with students from schools such as USC and Cal State Fullerton.
