= Tropical Sno =

Chain of shops that serve shaved ice

Coordinates: 40°43′39″N 111°59′40″W

- Tropical Sno logo
- Company type: Private
- Industry: Food services
- Founded: April 1984; 41 years ago in Provo, Utah, USA
- Headquarters: Draper, Utah, USA
- Website: Official website

Tropical Sno is a global chain of shops that serve shave ice. It was founded in April 1984 in Provo, Utah and now based in Draper, Utah.

== Information ==
Tropical Sno has dealers located in every US state and in foreign countries. Tropical Sno has been cited as an example of microfranchising. Tropical Sno is a retail brand derived from Pioneer Family Brands, Inc.

== In popular culture ==
Then President Barack Obama stopped for a snow cone at Tropical Sno in Denison, Iowa, in 2012 while campaigning.
