= Gregorys Coffee =

Coffee roaster and retailer based in New York, United States

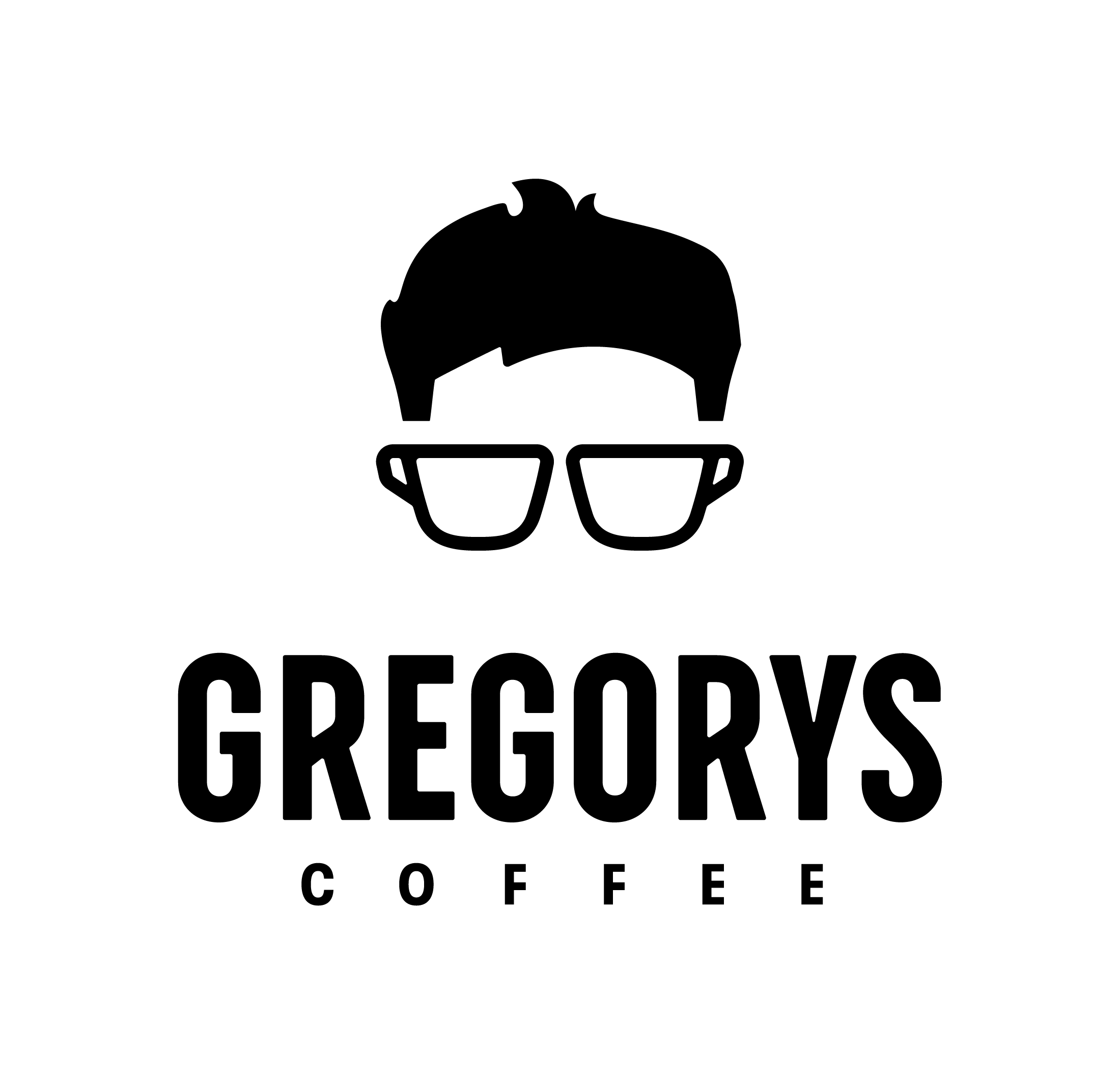
- Company type: Private
- Industry: Coffee
- Founded: 2006
- Founder: Gregory Zamfotis
- Headquarters: New York, New York
- Number of locations: 51 (2026)
- Products: Coffee
- Services: Food and Beverage
- Website: www.gregoryscoffee.com

Gregorys Coffee is a New York-based coffee roaster and retailer. Aside from a range of coffee and tea choices, Gregorys Coffee also offers fresh pastries, packaged foods, and a plant-based selection prepared from scratch daily.

The company logo is designed to look like its founder, with two mugs for glasses and a full head of wavy-hair.

== History ==
Gregorys Coffee was founded by Gregory Zamfotis in 2006, when he was a 24-year-old law student at Brooklyn Law School, with its first location on Park Avenue and 24th Street in Manhattan. The company is a part of the third wave coffee or specialty coffee industry.

Gregorys Coffee has been a family-oriented business for many years, with Gregory's family having various levels of involvement across the business over time.

As of 2026, the company currently operates 51 locations.

In August 2025, Craveworthy Brands became an investor and managing partner of Gregorys Coffee. The deal, for which financial terms were not disclosed, was intended to support the company’s expansion through franchising beyond its core Northeastern United States market. Founder Gregory Zamfotis remained as president of the brand. Additional investors in the funding round included Harborfield Management, Branded Hospitality, and Kitchen Fund.

== Locations ==
The company currently has cafés in New York, New Jersey, Connecticut, Washington, D.C., Pennsylvania, Illinois, Washington, California, Minnesota, Florida, Tennessee, and Arizona.

In September 2016, Gregorys opened a roastery and commissary in Long Island City, Queens, New York. Later that year opened its first location outside of New York, located on the Jersey City waterfront. In the same year, the company signed a 15-year lease at 16 Court Street, Brooklyn, marking their first store in the borough. In 2017, Gregorys opened several coffee shops in Washington, D.C.

In March 2020, Gregorys temporarily closed all 31 of their shops due to the coronavirus pandemic.

In 2024, Gregorys entered a partnership with the Simon Property Group, expanding into new states and bringing its store count to 54. Gregorys officially opened its 50th store in November 2024, located at the Woodfield Mall in Schaumberg, IL.

In 2025, Gregorys opened its first location in Central New Jersey in the Town of Old Bridge. Gregorys has plans to expand further in New Jersey, with two more stores contracted.

== See also ==
- Intelligentsia Coffee & Tea
- La Colombe Coffee Roasters
- Counter Culture Coffee
- Stumptown Coffee
