= Del Frisco's Double Eagle Steak House =

American fine dining restaurant steakhouse chain

- Industry: Restaurant (Steakhouse) Franchising
- Genre: Fine dining
- Founded: 1981; 45 years ago
- Founders: Dale "Del Frisco" Wamstad; Dee Lincoln
- Products: Steaks
- Owner: Del Frisco's Restaurant Group (1981–2019); Landry's, Inc. (2019–present)
- Website: delfriscos.com

Del Frisco's Double Eagle Steak House is a fine dining restaurant steakhouse chain founded in 1981 that was operated by Del Frisco's Restaurant Group until the restaurant was acquired by Landry's, Inc. in September 2019, with 71 locations across the United States.

== See also ==
- List of restaurants in New York City
- List of steakhouses
