= Ward's (restaurant) =

Mississippi-based fast food burger chain

- Company type: Privately held company
- Industry: Restaurants
- Genre: Fast food
- Founded: 1978; 48 years ago
- Founders: Richard and Ed Ward
- Headquarters: Hattiesburg, Mississippi
- Number of locations: 38 stores
- Key people: Glen Sullivan (CEO)
- Products: Hamburgers, chili burgers, chili dogs, French fries, root beer, milkshakes, floats
- Revenue: ▲US$10 Million (2022)
- Owner: Ward's Food Systems, Inc.
- Number of employees: 100 (2022)
- Website: Ward's Restaurant

Ward's Restaurant, known colloquially simply as Ward's, is a regional fast food restaurant chain based in Mississippi, United States, founded by Richard and Ed Ward in 1978. As of 2023, there are 38 Ward's locations across central and southern Mississippi. The chain is known for its chili burgers, chili dogs, and root beer.

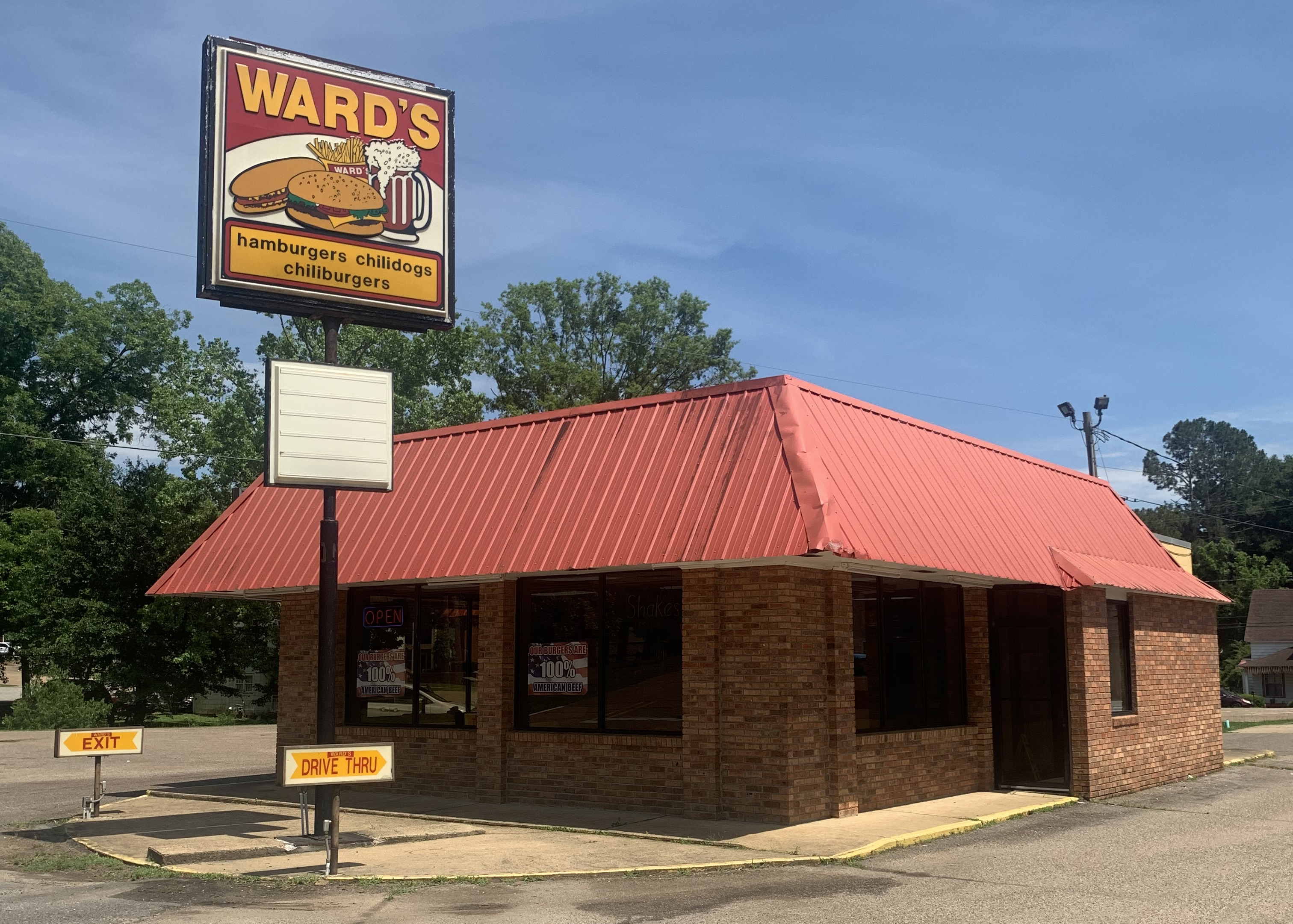
Ward’s in Union, Mississippi.

== History ==
In December 1957, twins Richard and Ed Ward opened a New Orleans–based Frostop franchise in Hattiesburg, Mississippi. Frostop served chili dogs, orange soda, and root beer in frosted glass mugs. On May 28, 1978, the Ward brothers opened the first Ward's restaurant at 40th Avenue and Hardy Street in Hattiesburg. By the early 1980s, the first franchised Ward's was opened in nearby Petal. The Ward brothers started Ward's Food Systems, Inc. in 1985 to manage the franchise. In 2004, Glen and Shelley Sullivan became the owners of Ward's and combined the franchise and restaurant companies. Richard Ward died in 2019 and Ed died in 2002.

== Products and services ==
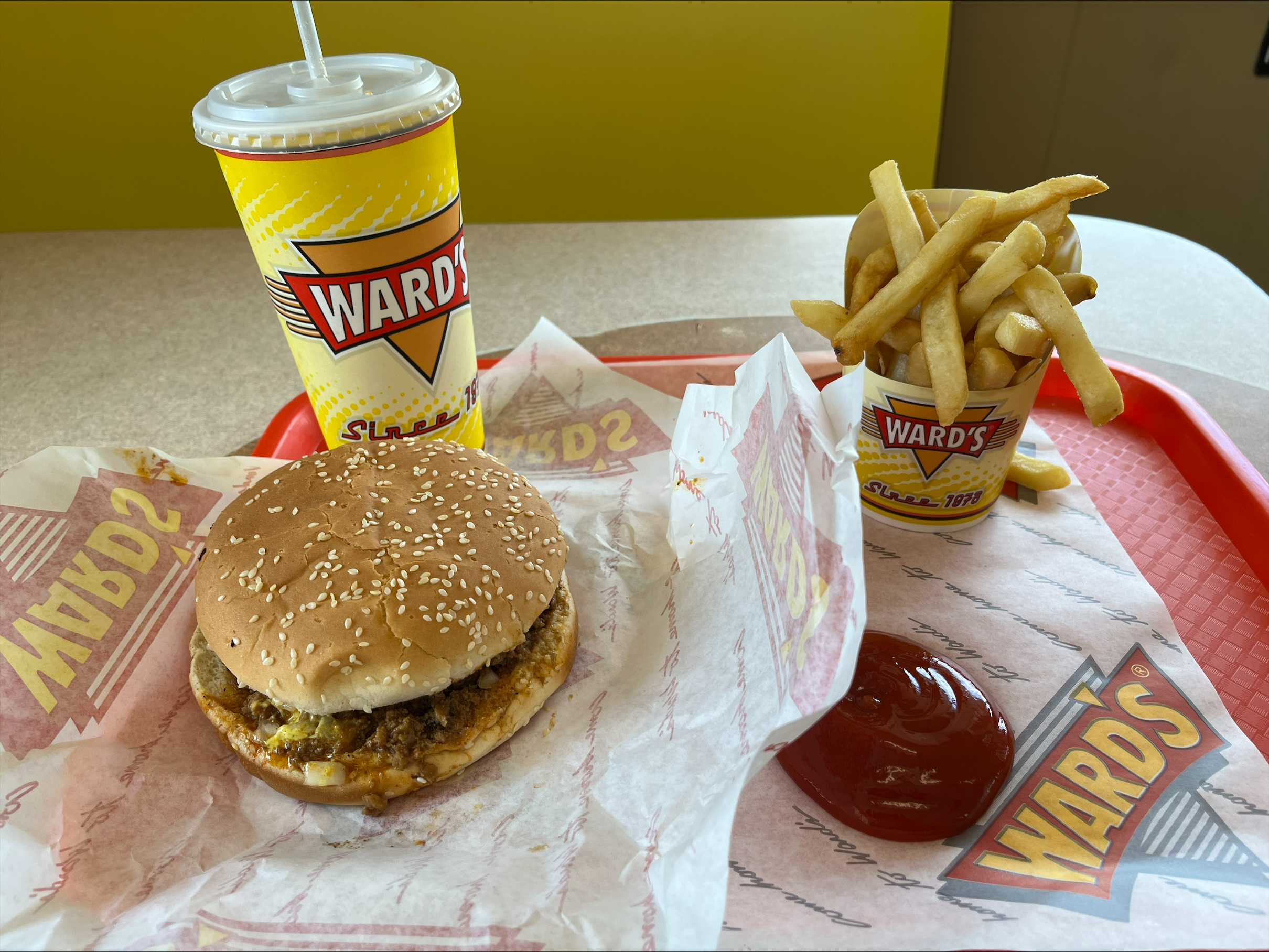
Ward's Big One, french fries, and root beer

After opening their own restaurant, the Ward brothers brought similar items from Frostop to their new menu, including chili burgers, chili dogs, and root beer. Today, Ward's offers chili burgers in two sizes: the larger burger is known as the "Big One" while the smaller option is known as the "Lil' One". Other options include the "Ward's Quarder", (which includes tomato and lettuce), wraps, chicken sandwiches, salads, hot dogs, catfish, and various sides. Various desserts include floats, ice cream, milkshakes, and fruit smoothies. Ward's also serves breakfast, including made-to-order eggs and a variety of biscuits and breakfast wraps.

Ward's is known for its root beer and chili topping. The Frostop restaurant served homemade root beer and Ward's carries on that tradition today. The chili used on the burgers and hot dogs and the root beer in each restaurant is made at each individual location every morning. Frosted glass mugs for root beer are available when dining-in at most restaurants. Root beer is also available by the gallon.

== See also ==
- Bumpers Drive-In, another Mississippi-based fast-food hamburger restaurant
- List of hamburger restaurants
