= WaBa Grill =

American restaurant chain

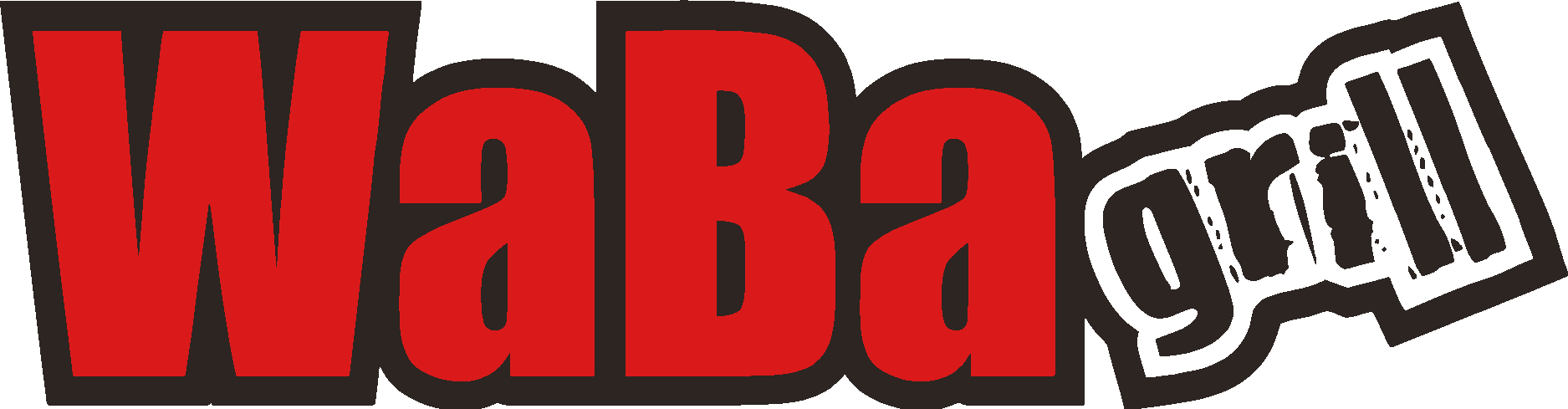
- Type: Private
- Founded: 2006; 20 years ago
- Founders: Kyle Lee; Brian Ham; Eric Lee
- Headquarters: Anaheim, California
- Number of locations: 115 (2023)
- Area served: Arizona; California; Nevada (planned)
- Key people: Andrew Kim (CEO)
- Website: www.wabagrill.com

WaBa Grill is an American fast casual restaurant chain specializing in Asian fusion and healthy foods. Based in the Southwestern United States and founded in 2006, it has been called "one of the nation's leading healthy rice bowl chains".

== History ==
WaBa Grill was founded in 2006 by Kyle Lee, Brian Ham, and Eric Lee, who still are involved in the business as of 2021.

During the start of the COVID-19 pandemic, in April 2020, employees of the chain, along with other restaurant workers, went on strike demanding protection equipment against the virus, hazard pay, and to be paid while on quarantine.

== Products ==
The majority of WaBa Grill's menu items are rice bowls, with toppings like chicken, plant-based steak, rib eye steak, salmon, shrimp, and tofu. Salads are offered, along with "Boom Boom Tacos", which are covered with a sesame dressing, green onions, and a mayonnaise-based boom boom sauce. Sides include dumplings, wontons, sliced avocados, edamame dipped in kimchi, and jalapeños mixed with carrots.

== Locations ==
As of 2023, the chain has 115 restaurants. In Arizona, it has two restaurants, in Avondale and Tempe. California has the other 113, primarily concentrated in the southern part of the state. It plans to expand into Nevada, with eight proposed stores in Clark County set to open by 2027. Other expansion projects encompass a ten-unit deal in the Dallas–Fort Worth metroplex, a thirteen-unit deal in Central California, and a ten-unit deal in Maricopa County, Arizona.

== Reception ==
Nation's Restaurant News included WaBa Grill on its list of the top 500 restaurant chains in America, placing it at #208. It also debuted at #45 on Fast Casual's Top 100 Movers & Shakers List in 2021.
