= Manila Sunset =

American Filipino-themed restaurant chain

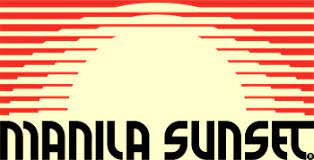

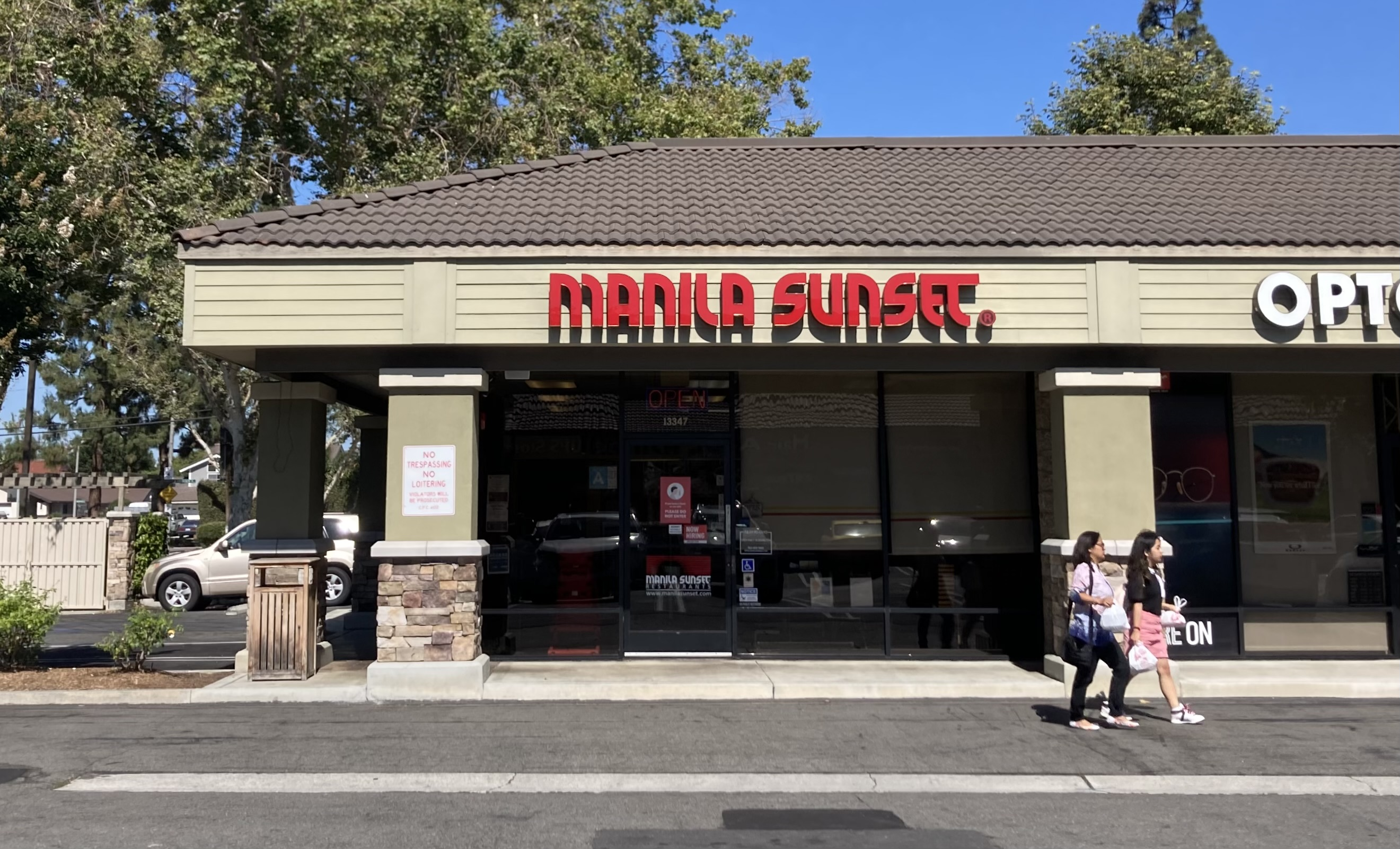
- A location in Cerritos, California
- Company type: Private
- Industry: Foodservice
- Founded: 1985; 41 years ago in Los Angeles, California
- Founder: Ben Halili
- Number of locations: 7 (2023)
- Area served: California; Washington
- Key people: Jay Halili (owner)
- Website: www.manilasunset.com

Manila Sunset is an American chain of Filipino-themed restaurants targeted towards overseas Filipinos. It mainly features foods from its culture and places its seven locations in areas with the highest concentration of them, namely Southern California and Washington.

The restaurant is family-run and family-owned. Its ingredients are made from scratch and mostly shipped in from the Philippines.

== History ==
The chain's first store opened in 1985, on Los Angeles' Sunset Boulevard, inspiring the restaurant's name, along with the idea that Manila was known for its sunsets. The founder, Ben and Lorna Halili, who migrated to the United States from the Philippines, intended to provide food for Filipinos in the United States who had missed the food of their ancestry. Halili had previously owned a restaurant called "Mami's Best." It then became popular with people of other cultures, not just from the Philippines. Ben and Lorna's son Jay Halili took over the business later.

== Menu ==
The restaurant's website displays the following food items:

- Bibingka (what the restaurant is known for; takes two days to make)
- Pancit Malabon
- Puto bumbong
- Goto
- Arroz caldo
- Tokwa't baboy
- Embutido
- Lumpiang Shanghai
- Fried lumpia
- Fresh lumpia
- Chicken barbecue
- Manila Pork Barbecue
- Pork Inihaw
- Inihaw Na Pusit
- Beef tapa
- Beef Korean barbecue
- Lechon kawali
- Daing Na Bangus
- Tocino
- Longganisa

== Locations ==
As of June 2023, Manila Sunset has seven locations, with six in Southern California (Cerritos, Los Angeles, National City, North Hills, Rancho Cucamonga, and West Covina) and one in Seattle. It is not currently planning on expanding.

== Reception ==
The chain has been praised by the Los Angeles Times for its exotic and inexpensive menu. The Inland Valley Daily Bulletin also gave a positive review.
