= Taco Villa =

U.S. fast-food restaurant chain

- Company type: Subsidiary
- Industry: Fast-food
- Founded: June 6, 1968; 57 years ago in Odessa, Texas
- Founder: Bobby D. Cox
- Number of locations: 30
- Parent: Bobby Cox Companies
- Website: tacovilla.net

Taco Villa is a U.S.-based fast-food restaurant chain specializing in Tex-Mex-style Mexican cuisine.

There are currently 20 locations in Amarillo, Andrews, Benbrook, Big Spring, Canyon, Lubbock, Midland and Odessa in TX and Clovis and Hobbs in NM, owned by the Bobby Cox Companies. The Bobby Cox Companies also owns the restaurant chains Rosa's Cafe and Texas Burger, as well as several non-restaurant ventures. There are 10 Taco Villa locations in Lubbock and Levelland, TX as well as Clovis, NM owned and operated by Endeavour Enterprises. Greg Blankenship, President and CEO of Endeavour Enterprises purchased the Taco Villas in August 1997. Endeavour Enterprises also owns other entities including Pizza Hut/WingStreets and Chinese Kitchen across West Texas and Eastern New Mexico.

== History ==
Bobby D. Cox opened the first restaurant in the chain on June 6, 1968, at 501 E. 8th St. in Odessa, TX. In August 1997, Greg Blankenship, President and CEO of Endeavour Enterprises purchased the Lubbock, TX Taco Villas. Greg continued to grow the concept in West Texas opening the Levelland, TX and Clovis, NM locations. Currently, Endeavour Enterprises operates 10 Taco Villas throughout Lubbock and Levelland, TX as well as Clovis, NM as well as other concepts and entities.

At one time, there were more than 50 Taco Villas, from as far east as Longview, Texas, to Albuquerque, New Mexico.

In 2012, Taco Villa expanded into North Texas by opening a store in Benbrook, TX. In 2013, a store was opened in North Fort Worth. In 2015, the Benbrook location was closed. In November 2018, the North Fort Worth location was closed.
