= D.P. Dough =

American calzone restaurant chain

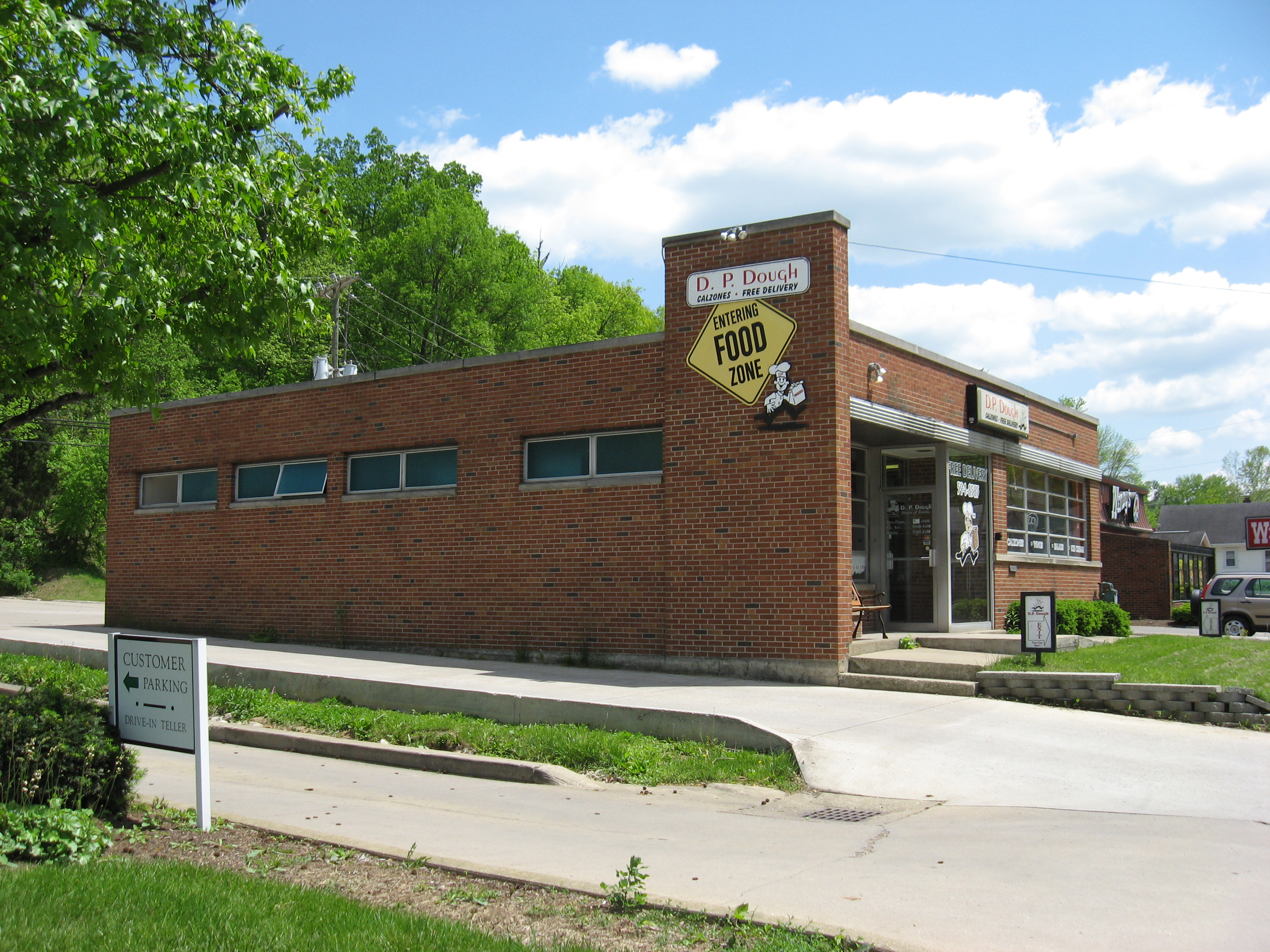
- location in Athens, Ohio
- Type: Franchise
- Industry: Food delivery Franchising
- Founded: Amherst, Massachusetts (1987)
- Founders: Dan and Penny Haley
- Headquarters: Columbus, Ohio
- Key people: Eric Cook, CEO, Food Guys, Inc.
- Products: Calzone
- Website: www.dpdough.com

D.P. Dough is an American chain of calzone restaurants started in Amherst, Massachusetts, and now headquartered in Columbus, Ohio. D.P. Dough restaurants are located in twenty-seven college towns across the United States, offering late-night food delivery primarily marketed to local student populations.

== History ==
Penny Haley originally debuted her calzones in 1983 at The Big E fair in West Springfield, Massachusetts, selling them to fairgoers from a food truck. In 1987, after Penny had operated the business for four years as a food truck, her son, Dan Haley, opened a retail location offering takeout and delivery of his mother's calzones. The restaurant's marketing primarily targeted students at the local University of Massachusetts—Amherst. Over the first twenty-five years, the business grew to include more than twenty franchise locations in addition to the original restaurant.

After acquiring the Athens, Ohio franchise in January 2011, Mark Crumpton, his wife Kim, and their son Matt, purchased the D.P. Dough business from Dan Haley later that year. D.P. Dough restaurants include both corporate-owned stores and independently owned franchises.

In 2018, Entrepreneur magazine named the chain as one of its "Top 200 Food and Restaurant Franchises of 2018." The chain drew attention for hiring O.A.R. band member Jerry DePizzo to manage franchise sales and IT updates intended to make the chain more popular with young, tech-friendly consumers.

In 2019, Food Guys Inc, the parent company of rival chain Calio's, founded by a former D.P. Dough employee in Cortland, NY, purchased D.P. Dough. Existing Calio's locations will be converted to D.P. Dough locations, with several already switching, albeit both chains being present in Rochester, New York and a few more areas, with overlapping stores being closed in other markets.

== Products ==
D.P. Dough describes itself as the "only national calzone franchise", and the restaurant chain focuses on its calzone offerings. The chain is known for "offering a wide variety of calzones with creative names". Twenty calzone varieties are standard across all locations, and D.P. Dough restaurants offer made-to-order custom calzones as well. Individual stores may also offer their own specialty calzones. In addition to the chain's signature calzone entrees, the restaurants also sell chicken wings, tater tots, bread sticks, fresh-baked cookies, dessert calzones, and pints of Ben & Jerry's ice cream.

The chain uses advertising messages directed to late-night, college-age customers. Some stores have offered "420" specials in April. Although in-store dining is available, the restaurants are designed to primarily cater to take-out and delivery customers. The store's late operating hours are intended to appeal to college students and the "after-bar crowd".
