= Stonefire Grill =

American restaurant chain

- A location in West Hills, Los Angeles
- Company type: Private
- Industry: Foodservice
- Founded: 2000
- Founders: Mary Harrigan; Maureen Harrigan
- Headquarters: Pasadena, California
- Number of locations: 12 (2024)
- Area served: Southern California
- Key people: David W. Youngberg (CEO)
- Revenue: ▲US$25M (2007)
- Owner: Goode Partners, LLC.
- Website: www.stonefiregrill.com

Stonefire Grill is an American fast casual restaurant chain serving Greater Los Angeles and Ventura County in California. The restaurant also runs a catering business. It is based in Pasadena, California.

== History ==
The restaurant was founded by sisters Mary and Maureen Harrigan in 2000. They grew up in a family of eleven and created the restaurant as a tribute to their mother, Mary Lou. The chain was acquired by private equity firm Goode Partners, LLC. in 2016. The company opened its first Inland Empire location, in Rancho Cucamonga, in 2017. A car accidentally drove into a restaurant in Valencia's patio in February 2018, causing no injuries as not one was eating at the patio when the car crashed.

== Menu ==
A burger meal offered by the chain

Items sold by the restaurant include: spinach dip, nachos, hot chicken, tortilla soup, cauliflower, tacos, breadsticks, cobb salad, caesar salad, garden salad, tri-tip, riblets, roast chicken, salmon filet, fettuccine Alfredo, pesto, marinara, rigatoni with bolognese sauce, macaroni and cheese, pizza, hawaiian pizza, French dip, club sandwich, chimichurri sub, cheeseburger, creamed corn, mashed potato, coleslaw, and potato salad, carrot cake, cheesecake, and chocolate brownie. It incorporates its tri-tip into many of its original items. Many dishes are inspired by Tex-Mex or Mexican cuisine.

== Locations ==
Stonefire Grill has 12 restaurants, all in Southern California. Two of the twelve are in Ventura County, while it has three in Orange County. There is also a location in Rancho Cucamonga in San Bernardino County. The remaining five are in Los Angeles County. The location in Lakewood is a building from 1966 designed by Maxwell Starkman.

== Philanthropy ==
In 2009, Stonefire Grill provided over 50 children from a local shelter a buffet dinner and $100 gift cards. In 2013, the restaurant donated "a generous portion" of its daily receipts to Henry Mayo Newhall Memorial Hospital's Breast Imaging Center in Valencia, California.
