= Veggie Grill =

American vegan restaurant chain

- Veggie Grill.
- Type: Private
- Founded: Irvine, California; (2006; 20 years ago)
- Founder: T.K. Pillan; Kevin Boylan; Ray White
- Headquarters: Santa Monica, California, United States
- Owner: Next Level Burger; (2024–present)
- Website: www.veggiegrill.com

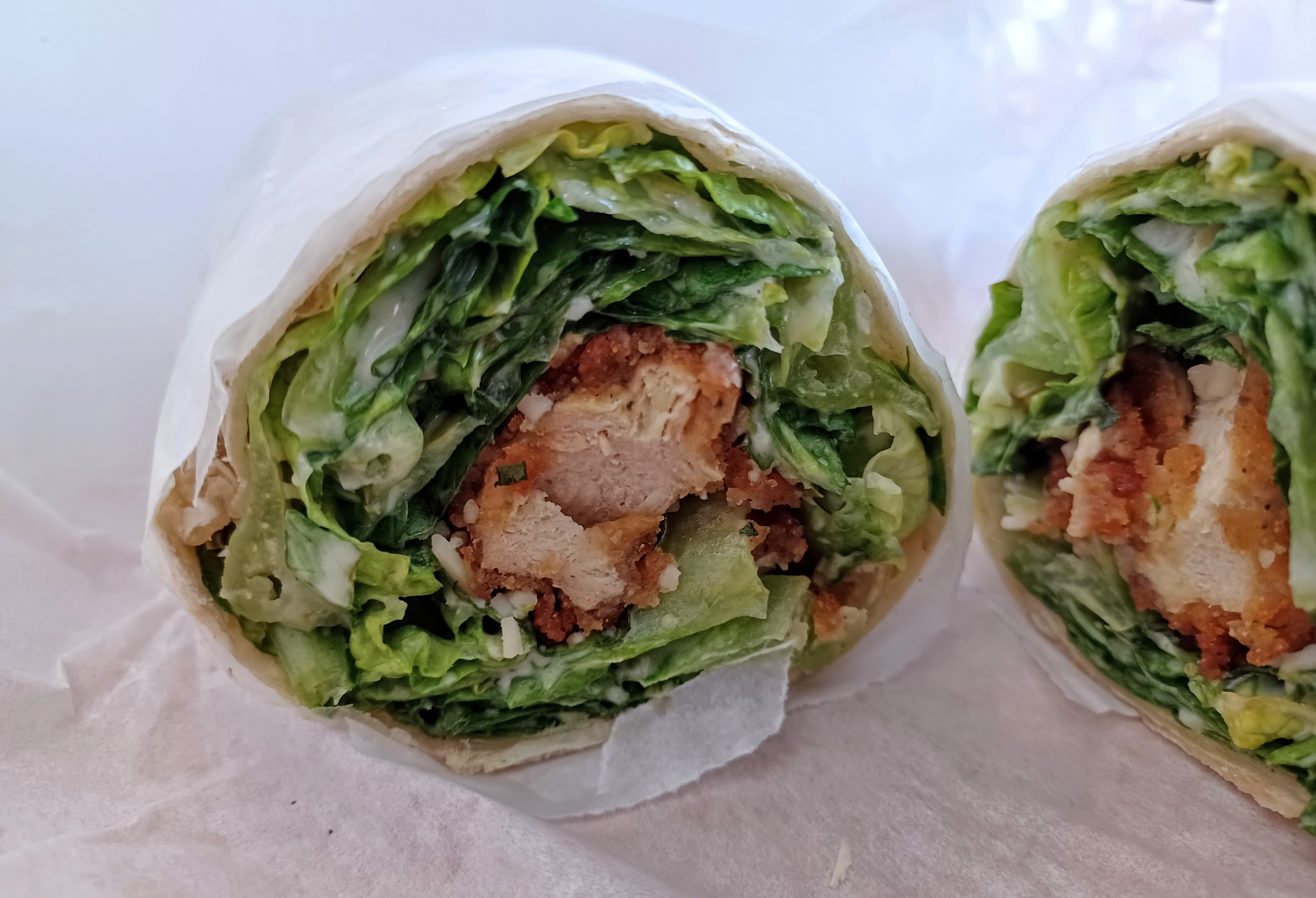
Crispy Chick'n Caesar Wrap served at Veggie Grill

Veggie Grill is a fast-casual vegan restaurant chain that operates in California, Oregon, Washington, Illinois, Massachusetts and New York. It is based in Irvine, California. The chain focuses on offering only plant-based food.

== History ==
In 2006, Kevin Boylan and T.K. Pillan co-founded Veggie Grill.

In 2013 the company raised $20 million in capital, mainly from Brentwood Associates, and announced plans for national expansion.

In 2023 it was announced 12 stores would be closing.

In January 2024, it was acquired by Oregon-based vegan fast food restaurant chain Next Level Burger.

== Expansion ==
Veggie Grill plans to double in the next couple of years. In early 2018, the restaurant opened two locations in Chicago, its first locations outside of the West Coast. Veggie Grill also intends to open four more Chicago-area locations at an undetermined date. In 2019 they opened a location in Harvard Square in Cambridge, Massachusetts, its first East Coast location.

== Partnerships and menu ==
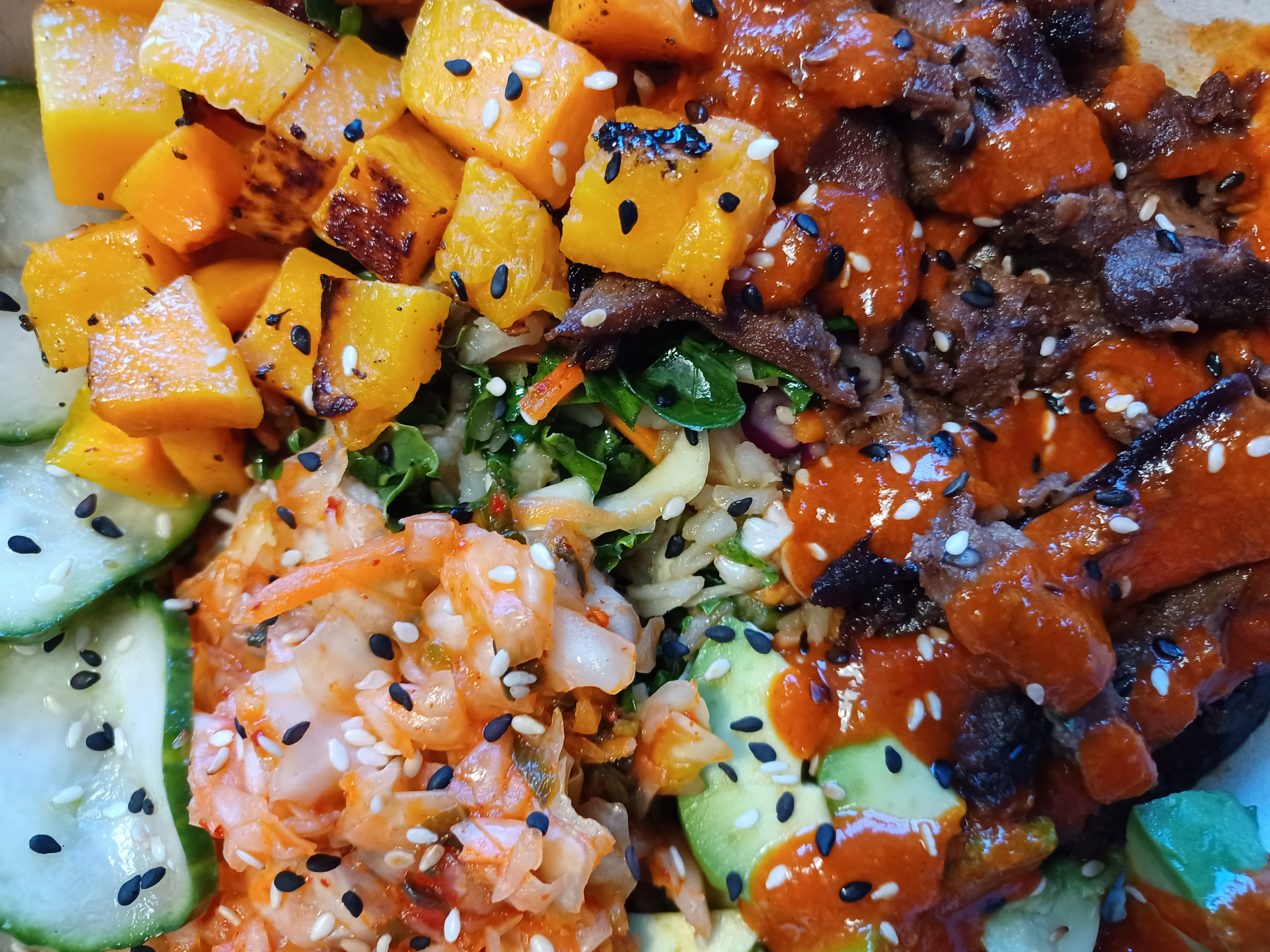
Korean Kimchi Beef Bowl served at Veggie Grill

In 2016, Veggie Grill partnered with Beyond Meat to create their plant-based burgers.

== Reception ==
Veggie Grill was voted "Best American" cuisine restaurant by The Los Angeles Times readers in 2012.

Veggie Grill received VegNews Magazine's winner for Favorite Vegan Chain in 2016, 2017, and 2018.

Veggie Grill made the list for 25 Most Innovative Consumer Brands of 2016 by Forbes.

== See also ==
- List of vegetarian and vegan restaurants
- Veganism
