= Del Frisco's Restaurant Group =

American restaurant company

Del Frisco's Restaurant Group, Inc.
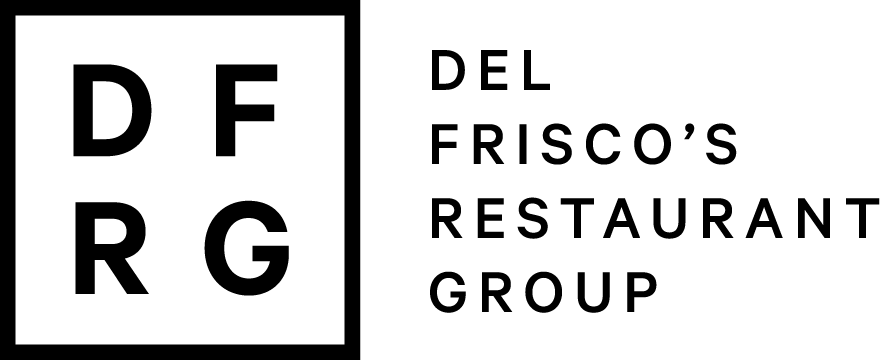
- Company type: Subsidiary
- Traded as: Nasdaq: DFRG
- ISIN: US2450771025
- Industry: Restaurant
- Founded: 1981; 45 years ago
- Defunct: September 2019; 6 years ago
- Fate: Acquired by Landry's Restaurants
- Headquarters: The Post Oak, Houston, Texas, U.S.
- Area served: United States
- Key people: Norman Abdullah (CEO); Jeff Carcara (CEO, Del Frisco's Emerging Brands)
- Brands: Del Frisco's Grille
- Services: Contemporary upscale restaurants
- Revenue: ▲US$361.431 million (fiscal 2017)
- Operating income: ▼ -US$22.169 million (fiscal 2017)
- Net income: ▼ -US$11.457 million (fiscal 2017)
- Total assets: ▼US$326.787 million (fiscal 2017)
- Total equity: ▼US$189.087 million (fiscal 2017)
- Number of employees: ~4,890 at December 26, 2017
- Subsidiaries: Del Frisco's Emerging Brands
- Website: dfrg.com

Del Frisco's Restaurant Group, Inc. was an American steakhouse restaurant chain company which focuses on steaks. The company was founded in 1981 and became public in 2012. Del Frisco's Restaurant Group operated Del Frisco's Grille and Del Frisco's Double Eagle Steak House in the United States. Market capitalization at the end of 2017 was US$327.84M.

== History ==
On September 21, 2018, Del Frisco's sold Sullivan's Steakhouse to Romano's Macaroni Grill for 32 million dollars (USD).

In June 2019, Del Frisco accepted an offer from L Catterton in the vicinity of $650 million cash. L Catterton will also purchase Del Frisco stock for $8.00 a share, as June 26, 2019, the closing price of Del Frisco stock was $7.94.

In September 2019, Landry's acquired Del Frisco's Restaurant Group for around $650 million.
