= List of casual dining restaurant chains =

This is a list of casual dining restaurant chains around the world, arranged in alphabetical order. A casual dining restaurant is a restaurant that serves moderately priced food in a casual atmosphere. Except for buffet-style restaurants and, more recently, fast casual restaurants, casual dining restaurants usually provide table service.

== Casual ==
Casual dining usually have waited tables but may have some variations with counter or self service such as buffet.

Name	Type	Location(s)	Number of locations	Notes
Adyar Ananda Bhavan	Indian foods and beverages	India, United States	200+	
America's Incredible Pizza Company	Pizza	United States, Mexico	8	
Anchor Bar	American	United States, Canada	15	
Angus Steakhouse	Steakhouse	United Kingdom	6	
Anjappar Chettinad Restaurant	Chettinad South Indian cuisine	Australia, Canada, Malaysia, Oman, Qatar, Singapore, Sri Lanka, United Arab Emirates, USA	30+	Privately owned Indian restaurant chain
Annalakshmi	Indian vegetarian	Australia, India, Malaysia, Singapore	4	
Applebee's	Bar & grill	United States, worldwide	1,600+ (2025)	
ASK Italian	Italian cuisine	United Kingdom	112	
Bahama Breeze	Caribbean	United States	12	Part of the Specialty Restaurant Group of Darden Restaurants
Bakers Square	Family	United States (6 Mid-west states)	32	Headquartered in Nashville, Tennessee.
Bar Louie Restaurants	Bar	United States	73	
Baton Rouge	Steakhouse	Canada	29	
Becks Prime	Gourmet burgers	United States	14	Texas-based
Beef O'Brady's	Irish sports pubs	United States	151	
Beefeater	Pub	United Kingdom	140	
Belgo	Bar	United Kingdom	7	
Bella Italia	Italian cuisine	United Kingdom	90	
Benihana	Japanese cuisine, steakhouse	United States, worldwide	116	
Bennigan's	Irish pub	12 in United States + 17 International	29	
Bertucci's	Italian	United States (predominantly Northeastern)	58	Earl Enterprises
Bickford's	Cafeteria	United States	3	Also operated the Foster's brand
Big Boy	Family and some casual	United States (primarily Michigan), Thailand	77	In 2020–21 added three franchisees, including one covering Southeast Asia and Australia.
Bill's	Casual dining	United Kingdom	131	
BJ's Restaurants	American	United States (27 states)	205	Pizza, grill, microbrewery
Black Angus Steakhouse	Steakhouse	United States (Western)	45	Also known as Stuart Anderson's
Black-eyed Pea	Country casual	United States (Colorado & Texas)	13	Includes full alcohol service and bar
Bob Evans Restaurants	American	United States (18 Mid-west and Mid-Atlantic states)	527	Specializing in country-style cooking
Bob's Big Boy	Family, casual, and drive-in	Southern California	5	The original Big Boy chain founded by Bob Wian in 1936. Marriott and JB's Restaurants once used the Bob's name in other areas of the US including toll roads. Many Howard Johnson's restaurants were converted to Bob's.
Bonefish Grill	Seafood	United States	215	
Boomarang Diner	Family	United States	55	
Boston Pizza	Bar & grill	United States, Canada, Mexico	388	Known outside Canada as Boston's The Gourmet Pizza
Bread Ahead	Bakery	United Kingdom	7	British bakery and casual diner
Brewers Fayre	Pub	United Kingdom	161	A sister chain to Beefeater
Brio Tuscan Grille	Casual dining	United States	118	Part of Bravo Brio Restaurant Group
Brotzeit	Casual dining	Singapore, worldwide	11	Exotic Bavarian cuisine served at restaurants located in the Far East
Bubba Gump Shrimp Company	Seafood	Worldwide	45	
Buca di Beppo	Italian	United States, United Kingdom, United Arab Emirates	88	
Buffalo Grill	Steakhouse	France, worldwide	360	
Buffalo Wild Wings	American	United States, North America, Asia	1,279	American casual dining restaurant and sports bar
Buffalo Wings & Rings	American	United States, worldwide	81	This restaurant is similar to Buffalo Wild Wings and Buffalo's Cafe.
Buffalo's Cafe	American	United States, Asia, Middle East	51	Buffalo-Texan style
Burger Fuel	Burgers	New Zealand, Australia, United Arab Emirates, Saudi Arabia, Egypt, Kuwait, Iraq, United States	87	
Byron Hamburgers	Burgers	United Kingdom	69	
Cabalen	Filipino	Philippines, United States	18	Buffet restaurant chain specializing in exotic delicacies such as betuteng tugak (stuffed frog), kamaru (crickets), adobong pugo (quail) and balut (developing bird embryo)
Cactus Club Cafe	Premium casual	Canada	27	
Café Rouge	French	United Kingdom	120+	
California Pizza Kitchen	Pizza	United States, Mexico, Asia-Pacific region, Western Asia	200+	
Camille's Sidewalk Cafe	Casual dining	United States	146	
Cantina Mariachi	Mexican	Spain, Portugal, United States, United Arab Emirates	119	
The Capital Grille	Steakhouse	United States, Central America	80	
Carino's Italian	Italian	United States	84	
Carlos'n Charlie's	Mexican	Mexico, Caribbean	10	Grupo Anderson's
Carluccio's Ltd	Italian	United Kingdom, worldwide	400	
Carrabba's Italian Grill	Italian-American cuisine	United States	247	
Carrows	Family	United States	9	Owned by Catalina Restaurant Group, Inc.
Champps Americana	Bar & grill	United States	11	Traded on NASDAQ under CMPP
Charlie Brown's Fresh Grill	Steakhouse	United States (New Jersey)	2	Once the largest steakhouse chain in New Jersey, only two locations remain
Cheba Hut	Sandwiches	United States, worldwide	20	Themed around cannabis culture
Cheddar's Scratch Kitchen	Casual dining	United States	171	Acquired by Darden Restaurants in 2017
The Cheesecake Factory	American	United States	210	Mostly known for its cheesecake
Chevys Fresh Mex	Mexican	United States	38	Was owned by PFS (Pepsi)
Chickie's & Pete's	Bar & grill	United States (Philadelphia metropolitan area)	19	
Chili's	American, Tex-Mex	United States, worldwide	1,606	Brinker Int'l.
Chiquito	Mexican	United Kingdom	68	
Chuck-A-Rama	Buffet	United States	12	
Chuck E. Cheese	Pizza	United States, worldwide	600+	
Chuy's	Tex-Mex	United States	102	
Cicis	Pizza	United States	423	
Claim Jumper	Steakhouse	United States (Arizona, California, Illinois, Nevada, Oregon, Washington and Wisconsin)	37	
Coco's Bakery	Family	United States (western)	49	Owned by Catalina Restaurant Group, Inc.
Congo Grille	Filipino grill	Philippines	10	
Cooper's Hawk Winery & Restaurants	Restaurant and winery	United States	30	Winery and tasting room
Copeland's	New Orleans cuisine	United States	20	
Cora	Breakfast and lunch	Canada	130	
Côte	Casual dining	United Kingdom	94	
Cotton Patch Café	Country casual	United States (Texas, Oklahoma, New Mexico)	52	
The Counter	Casual burgers	United States, worldwide	45	
Crabby Joe's Tap & Grill	Casual dining	Canada	35	
Cracker Barrel	Country casual	United States	645	A restaurant with gift shop
Dametra Cafe	Mediterranean	United States	3	
Dave & Buster's	Family, entertainment, arcade	United States, Canada	122	
Dave's Hot Chicken	chicken tenders and sliders	United States, Middle East	107	
Del Frisco's Double Eagle Steak House	Steakhouse	United States	16	
Dencio's	Bar & grill	Philippines	30	Owned by Pancake House Incorporation
Denny's	Family	United States, and 14 other countries	1,700	
Dick's Last Resort	Bar	United States	13	
Dickey's Barbecue Pit	Barbecue	United States	560+	
Din Tai Fung	Chinese	Taiwan, Asia, North America, Australia	60	
Dindigul Thalappakatti Restaurant	Chettinad South Indian cuisine	India, United Arab Emirates, France	51	
Dishoom	Indian café	United Kingdom	7	Founded in 2010
Dixie Chili and Deli	Chili	United States	3	
Dunn's	Steakhouse	Canada	6	
Earls	Kitchen & bar	United States, Canada	65	
East Side Mario's	Italian	United States, Canada	85+	Prime Restaurants
Eat'n Park	Family	United States (Pennsylvania, Ohio, and West Virginia)	64	A Big Boy franchise until 1974
Eddie Rocket's	Family	Ireland	42	This restaurant is similar to Johnny Rocket's.
Eddie V's Prime Seafood	Seafood	United States	32	
Ed's Easy Diner	Casual dining	United Kingdom	24	1950s-style diner
El Fenix	Tex-Mex	United States (Texas and Oklahoma)	22	
El Torito	Mexican	United States (California and Oregon)	69	
Famous Dave's	Barbecue	United States	180	
Feng Sushi	Sushi	United Kingdom	8	
Fleming's Prime Steakhouse & Wine Bar	Steakhouse	United States	69	
Flunch	Family	France, Spain, Portugal, Italy, Poland and Russia	180, approximately	
Fogo de Chão	Churrascaria	United States, worldwide	52	Brazilian-style steakhouse based in the United States
Fox's Pizza Den	Pizza	United States	250	
Franco Manca	Pizza	United Kingdom	40	
Frankie & Benny's	Italian-American	United Kingdom	250+	
Fresh to Order	Casual dining	United States	15	
Friendly's	Diner	United States (Eastern)	200	
Frisch's Big Boy	Family	United States (Indiana, Kentucky, most of Ohio and Tennessee)	31	No longer affiliated with Big Boy Restaurants International, Frisch's owns the Big Boy trademark in its exclusive territory. Purchased by NRD Holdings in 2015, before being bought out again by employees in 2024 after a series of evictions closed the majority of locations.
Garduño's	Mexican cuisine	United States	6	
Gator's Dockside	American, sports bar & grill	United States (Florida)	29	
Gerry's Grill	Filipino grill	Philippines	75	
Giraffe World Kitchen	Café	United Kingdom	44	
Golden Corral	Buffet and grill	United States	489	
Golden Nugget Pancake House	Family	United States	7	
Gourmet Burger Kitchen	Gourmet burgers	United Kingdom, worldwide	80	
Graffiti Junktion	Casual dining	United States	13	
Grandy's	Country style	United States	38	
Ground Round	Family	United States	22	Franchisee cooperative (formerly owned by Howard Johnson's)
Guzman y Gomez	Casual dining	Australia, Singapore, Japan	107	
Haidilao	Hot pot	China, United States, worldwide	300	
Happy	Casual dining	Bulgaria, Romania, Spain, United Kingdom	27	
Happy Joe's	Pizza	United States	52	
Happy's Pizza	Pizza	United States	65+	
Hard Rock Cafe	Restaurant with concert	United States, worldwide	185	Rock and roll theme
Harry Ramsden's	Seafood	United Kingdom, Ireland	35	
Harvester	Family	United Kingdom	230+	
Hash House a go go	Family	United States	11	
Hippopotamus	Family	France	170	
Hog's Australia's Steakhouse	Steakhouse	Australia, worldwide	75	
Holey Artisan Bakery	Bakery	Bangladesh, Thailand	5	
Hooters	Bar, cookout grill	United States, worldwide	430	Its mascot is an owl.
HopCat	Bar	United States	17	
Hoss's Steak and Sea House	Steakhouse, seafood	United States (Pennsylvania and West Virginia)	36	American ambiance
Houlihan's	Bar & grill	United States	84	
Houston's Restaurant	American	United States	51	
Huddle House	Family	United States (21 states, but mainly in the south)	349	
HuHot Mongolian Grill	Asian	United States	70+	Create your own stir-fry chain
Hurricane Grill & Wings	Chicken wings	United States	71	
Hwy 55 Burgers Shakes & Fries	Diner	United States, Canada, United Arab Emirates	135	
IHOP	Pancake house	United States, worldwide	1,650	
Islands Fine Burgers & Drinks	Burgers	United States (western)	50+	
J. Alexander's	Casual dining	United States	46	The company owns Stoney River.
Jack Astor's Bar and Grill	Casual dining	Canada	41	
Jensen's Bøfhus	Steakhouse, family	Denmark, Sweden, Germany	33	
Jim's Restaurants	Family	United States (Texas)	18	Owned by Frontier Enterprises, which also owns Magic Time Machine restaurants
Jimmy Buffett's Margaritaville	Casual dining	United States	23	
Jimmy's Restaurants	Buffet	United Kingdom	11	
Jinya Ramen Bar	Ramen noodles	United States, Canada	35	
Joe's Crab Shack	Seafood	United States (28 states)	57	Owned by Ignite Restaurant Group
Joey's Seafood Restaurants	Seafood	Canada, North America	100	
Johnny Rockets	Family	Worldwide	320	1950s-style diner
John's Incredible Pizza Company	Pizza	United States	13	
The Keg	Steakhouse	United States, Canada	160	
Kelseys Original Roadhouse	Bar & grill	Canada	88	Owned by Cara Operations
Ker's WingHouse Bar & Grill	Bar & grill	United States	28	
Kings Family Restaurants	Family	United States (Pennsylvania and Ohio)	34	
Kona Grill	Casual dining	United States	46	
La Porchetta	Italian	Australia, New Zealand	200	
La Tasca	Bar & tapas	United Kingdom	6	
Landry's Seafood	Seafood	United States	20	Landry's, Inc. owns 30+ casual dining restaurant chains
Larkburger	Casual dining	United States	13	
Las Iguanas	Casual chicken	United Kingdom	53	
Laughing Planet	Casual dining	United States	13	Internet café-like restaurant
Lawry's	Steakhouse	United States, worldwide	98	Also a brand by McCormick & Company
Lazy Dog Restaurant & Bar	Bar & grill	United States (California)	30	
Lee's Famous Recipe Chicken	Chicken	United States, worldwide	142	
Legal Sea Foods	Seafood	East Coast of the United States	35	
Little Anita's	Mexican cuisine	United States	13	
Little Sheep Group	Chinese	China, worldwide	300	Owned by Yum China
Loch Fyne Restaurants	Seafood	United Kingdom	25	
Logan's Roadhouse	Steakhouse	United States	230	Acquired by CraftWorks Restaurants & Breweries in 2018
LongHorn Steakhouse	Steakhouse	United States, Asia	491	
Luby's	Homestyle foods	United States	129	Currently owns Fuddruckers and the defunct chains Koo Koo Roo and Cheeseburger in Paradise
Lucille's Smokehouse Bar-B-Que	Barbecue	United States	24	
Maggiano's Little Italy	Italian	United States	52	
Maid-Rite	Casual dining	United States	70	Classic themed
Mandarin Restaurant	Canadian Chinese	Canada	28	
Marie Callender's	Family	United States (western, southwestern)	58	Home cooking ambiance
Marrybrown	Chicken	Asia, worldwide	350	
Mary Brown's	Chicken	Canada	140	
Max & Erma's	Casual dining	United States	51	
McCormick & Schmick's	Seafood	United States	60	
MCL Restaurant & Bakery	Family	United States (midwest)	13	Originally a cafeteria chain
Medieval Times	Medieval theme restaurant	United States and Canada	9	Live jousting and sword fights
Mellow Mushroom	Pizza	United States	200	
The Melting Pot	Casual dining	United States, worldwide	167	
Mikes	Italian	Canada	70	
Milano	Pizza	Ireland	14	A subsidiary of PizzaExpress
Milestones Grill and Bar	Bar & grill	Canada	45+	Owned by Cara Operations
Miller's Ale House	Bar & grill	United States	78	Owned by Roark Capital Group
Mimi's Cafe	French café, New Orleans, and American	United States	145	Owned by Bob Evans Farms, Inc.
Monical's Pizza	Pizza	United States	60	Central United States
Montana Mike's	Steakhouse	United States	80	
Montana's BBQ & Bar	Steakhouse	Canada	94	Owned by Recipe Unlimited
Moo Moo Restaurant	Buffet	Russia	12	
Morton's The Steakhouse	Steakhouse	United States	78	
Moxie's Grill & Bar	Casual dining	Canada, United States	67	
Mr. Gatti's Pizza	Pizza	United States	41	Operating under Chapter 11 bankruptcy reorganization since January 2019
Mr. Mike's	Steakhouse	Canada	49	
Nickels Grill & Bar	Casual dining	Canada	52	
The Ninety Nine Restaurant & Pub	American	United States	97	
Ocean Prime	Seafood and steakhouse	United States	9	
O'Charley's	American	United States	230+	
Ojos Locos	Sports bar	United States	8	
OK Diner	Roadside restaurants	United Kingdom	8	1950s-style diner
Old Chicago Pizza & Taproom	Pizza	United States	60	
Old Country Buffet	Buffet	United States	19	Also known as HomeTown Buffet in some markets
The Old Spaghetti Factory	Italian	United States, Canada, Japan	45	
Olga's Kitchen	Family	United States	27	
Olive Garden	Italian	United States, worldwide	892	
On the Border Mexican Grill & Cantina	Mexican	Worldwide	150+	
The Original Pancake House	Breakfast	United States	150	
Outback Steakhouse	Steakhouse, Australian	Worldwide (predominantly United States)	1,002	
P. F. Chang's China Bistro	Asian	United States	305	
Pamela's Diner	Family	United States	5	
Pancake Parlour	Family	Australia	11	
Pancho's Mexican Buffet	Tex-Mex	United States	14	
Panda Inn	American Chinese cuisine	Metropolitan Los Angeles	4	Older sibling of Panda Express, but has table service. Had more locations before Panda Express opened.
Pappadeaux	Seafood	United States	80	Part of Pappas Restaurants
Peppes Pizza	Pizza	Norway	76	
Perkins Restaurant and Bakery	Family	United States, Canada	371	
Peter Piper Pizza	Pizza	United States	149	Now owned by Chuck E. Cheese's
Phở Hòa	Vietnamese	Canada, Indonesia, Malaysia, Philippines, South Korea, Taiwan, United States	72	
Pizza Boli's	Pizza	United States	80	
Pizza Celentano	Pizza	Ukraine	150	
Pizza Hut	Italian-American cuisine	United States, worldwide	18,431	Formerly part of Yum! Brands
Pizza Inn	Italian-American cuisine	United States	158	
PizzaExpress	Pizza	United Kingdom, worldwide	470	Also owns Milano and Marzano
Planet Hollywood	Bar & grill	Worldwide	6	Backed by Sylvester Stallone, Bruce Willis, Demi Moore, and Arnold Schwarzenegger
Po' Folks	Country-style comfort food	United States	8	At one time, had over 100 locations in 17 states before decline
Ponderosa and Bonanza Steakhouses	Steakhouse	United States	88	
Prezzo	Italian	United Kingdom	180	
Primanti Bros.	American food	United States	40	
Pyongyang	Casual dining	North Korea, worldwide	130	
Quaker Steak & Lube	Steakhouse	United States (eastern)	50	Vehicle garage theme
Quanjude	Peking duck	China, worldwide	52	
Rainforest Cafe	Themed restaurant	United States, Canada, France, the United Kingdom, the U.A.E., and Japan	24	Each restaurant has a rainforest theme.
Red Hot & Blue	Barbecue	United States	17	
Red Lobster	Seafood	United States, worldwide	705	
Red Robin	American food	United States	538	
Redneck Heaven	Sports bar	United States	3	
Redstone American Grill	American	United States	9	
Ricky's All Day Grill	Family	Canada	67	
Roadhouse Grill	Steakhouse	Italy, Bulgaria, Brazil	53	Formerly in the US
Romano's Macaroni Grill	Italian	Worldwide	98	Owned by Ignite Restaurant Group
Rosa's Cafe	Tex-Mex	United States	42	
Roscoe's House of Chicken and Waffles	Soul food	United States (Southern California)	7	
Round Table Pizza	Pizza	United States (western, Hawaii, Alaska)	500+	Founded in 1959
Roy's	Seafood	United States	27	
Rua do Cunha	Casual dining	Macau, worldwide	21	
Ruby Tuesday	American food and drink	United States, worldwide	540	Acquired by NRD Capital in 2017
Ruby's Diner	Family	United States	58	Pier-like restaurants
Russ'	Family	West Michigan, United States	12	
Rusty Bucket Restaurant & Tavern	American food and drink	United States	23	Founded in 2002 in Columbus, Ohio
Ruth's Chris Steak House	Steakhouse	United States	100+	Owned by Ruth's Hospitality Group
Saizeriya	Italian	Asia (predominantly Japan)	1,000+	
Salisbury House	Family	Canada	16	
Saltgrass Steak House	Steakhouse	United States	50	
Sam Woo Restaurant	Hong Kong-style Chinese	United States, Canada	12	
Saravana Bhavan	Vegetarian South Indian cuisine	Worldwide	82	Hotel Saravana Bhavan is one of the largest vegetarian restaurant chains in the world.
Schnitz	Casual dining	Australia	73	
Scores	Rotisserie	Canada	45+	
Seasons 52	Grill and bar	United States	43	
Señor Frog's	Mexican bar	United States, Mexico, Caribbean, South America	21	Grupo Anderson's
Shari's Cafe & Pies	Family	United States	95	Now owns Carrows and Coco's Bakery
Shoeless Joe's	Sports grill	Canada	30	
Shoney's	Family	United States (southeast, lower midwest)	150, approximately	Once affiliated with Big Boy Restaurants; dropped in 1980s so company could expand beyond territorial restrictions
Simon's Burger	Burgers	Hungary, Slovakia, Austria	28	Company owns the Smashy Burger in New York City
Sirloin Stockade	Steakhouse	United States, Mexico	80	
Sizzler	Steakhouse	United States	270	Company owns the Sizzler trademark inside the United States
Sizzler International	Steakhouse	Australia, Asia	86	Company owns the Sizzler trademark outside the United States
Skyline Chili	Chili	United States	152	Chili-based restaurant
Smitty's	Family	Canada	85	
Smoke's Poutinerie	Poutine	Canada, worldwide	81	
Smokey Bones	Barbecue	United States (eastern, central)	66	
Sonny Bryan's Smokehouse	Barbecue	Dallas–Fort Worth	7	A favorite of celebrities including Julia Child, Emeril Lagasse, Dean Fearing, George W. Bush, Larry Hagman, Chuck Norris, and Jimmy Buffett
Sonny's BBQ	Barbecue	United States	113	
Souper Salad	Salads	United States	25	
Spaghetti Warehouse	Italian	United States	8	
Spur Steak Ranches	Steakhouse	South Africa	333	
St-Hubert	Rôtisserie	Ontario, Québec and New-Brunswick, but mainly in Québec	121	
Star Kabab	Kabab	Bangladesh	5+	
Steak 'n Shake	Family	United States, Europe, Middle East	842	Known for hamburgers and hand-dipped milkshakes
Sticks'n'Sushi	Sushi	United Kingdom, Denmark, Germany	20	
Stoney River Legendary Steaks	Steakhouse	United States	13	
Strada	Italian	United Kingdom	21	Also has its Coppa Clubs
Swiss Chalet	Family	United States, Canada	200+	Owned by Recipe Unlimited
Symposium Cafe	Casual dining	Canada	30	
Table Table	Food groups	United Kingdom	105	A restaurant group by Whitbread
Taco Palenque	Mexican	United States	19	
Tahoe Joe's	Steakhouse	United States	10	
Texas de Brazil	Steakhouse	United States, worldwide	50+	
Texas Roadhouse	Steakhouse	United States, Asia	563	Texas-themed steakhouse.
TGI Fridays	American	United States, worldwide	870	Founded in 1965. Known for big ribs, burgers and mixed drinks.
Thai Express	Thai	Canada, United Kingdom	250	Not related to Singapore-based Thai Express (Singapore)
Thai Express (Singapore)	Thai	Singapore, Asia	69	Not related to Montreal-based Thai Express
Tijuana Flats	Tex-Mex	United States	130	
Tilted Kilt Pub & Eatery	Pub	United States, Canada	47	
Toby Carvery	Carvery	United Kingdom	158	
Tony Roma's	Barbecue	Worldwide	150+	Ribs
Trader Vic's	Polynesian-themed restaurants	United States, worldwide	18	Had more locations during the Cold War era.
Tumbleweed Tex Mex Grill & Margarita Bar	Mexican	United States (Kentucky and four Midwestern states)	19	
Twin Peaks	Sports bar	United States	61	
Uno Pizzeria & Grill	Pizza	United States	102	
Valentino's	Italian	United States	36	
Vic & Anthony's Steakhouse	Steakhouse	United States	3	Located inside the Golden Nugget Casinos
Village Inn	Family	United States	212	
Waffle House	Family	United States (25 states, but mainly in the south)	2,100	
Wagamama	Japanese cuisine	United Kingdom, worldwide	150+	
Wahaca	Mexican	United Kingdom	27	
Wahlburgers	Burgers	United States	31	Also has a TV series on A&E
Walker Bros.	Pancake house	United States	7	
Weathervane Restaurant	Seafood	United States	6	
Weber Grill Restaurant	Steakhouse	United States	5	Based on the Weber-Stephen business
Western Sizzlin'	Steakhouse	United States	54	
Wienerwald	Chicken Hendl and Schnitzel	Germany	13	At one time had 1,600 locations throughout Europe
Wildwood Kitchen	Italian	United Kingdom	12	
Wimpy	Diner	South Africa, United Kingdom	500+	Not to be confused with the similar named Canadian company
Wimpy's Diner	Family	Canada	54	Not to be confused with the similar named South African company
Wingstop	Chicken	United States	1,000	
Yard House	Sports bar	United States	66	
Zizzi	Italian cuisine	United Kingdom, Ireland	100	

== Fast casual ==
This type usually has a drive thru or counter service with tables inside, but no waiters.

Name	Type	Location(s)	Number of locations	Notes
&pizza	Pizza	United States	30	
4 Fingers Crispy Chicken	Fast casual Asian fried chicken	Singapore	27	Privately owned, operates throughout Southeast Asia
Al Farooj Fresh	Chicken and sandwiches	United Arab Emirates, worldwide	35	
Al Tazaj	Chicken	Saudi Arabia, United Arab Emirates, worldwide	100	
Aladdin's Eatery	Lebanese cuisine	United States	30	Midwestern and Mid-Atlantic states
Atlanta Bread Company	Cafe and bakery	United States	32	
Au Bon Pain	Breakfast and lunch	United States, worldwide	204	Now a subsidiary of Panera Bread
Azzip Pizza	Pizza	Indiana, Illinois, Kentucky	6	Expanding in the Illinois-Indiana-Kentucky tri-state area
Baja Fresh	Tex-Mex	United States, Asia	162	
Barberitos	Tex-Mex	United States	26	
Ben & Florentine	Breakfast and lunch	Canada	60	
Bibibop Asian Grill	Korean rice bowls	United States	74	
Big Apple Bagels	Bagels	United States	50	
Big Chicken	Gourmet chicken sandwiches, cookies as big as basketballs, with craft beers at some locations	United States	18	Restaurant chain founded by NBA star Shaquille O'Neal
Big Smoke Burger	Gourmet burgers and poutine	Canada, Middle East	17	
Billy Sims Barbecue	Barbecue	United States	54	Founded by Billy Sims and Jeff Jackson in 2004
Biscuit Love	Breakfast and lunch	United States	3	
Blake's Lotaburger	Burgers	United States	75	
Blaze Pizza	Pizza	United States, Canada, West Asia	300+	Customer-designed pizza made within three minutes
Bobby's Burger Palace	Burgers	United States	15	
Boloco	Fast casual	United States	9	Based in Massachusetts
Boston Market	Chicken	United States	16	1 in India Used to have 1200 stores. Started as Boston Chicken
Bruegger's	Bakery/coffeehouse	United States	216	
Burger Lounge	Burgers	United States	13	
BurgerFi	Burgers	United States	106	
Burgerville	Burgers and fries	United States	39	American-classic style
Cafe Barbera	Coffeehouse	United States, Italy, worldwide	49	
Cafe Express	Bistro	United States	19	Was owned by Wendy's, but later sold back
Cafe Rio	Mexican grill	United States (western)	120	
Café Yumm!	Fast casual	United States	23	
California Fish Grill	Seafood	United States	24	
California Tortilla	Mexican	United States	51	
Capriotti's	Sandwiches	United States	106	
Captain D's	Seafood	United States	526	
Cava	Mediterranean	United States	263 (in 2023)	Absorbed former Zoës Kitchen
Charleys Philly Steaks	Sandwiches	United States, worldwide	600	
Cheeburger Cheeburger	Burgers	United States	25	1950s-style diner
Chez Ashton	Poutine	Canada	25	
Chick-fil-A	Chicken	United States, Canada	2,200	
Chicken Salad Chick	Chicken	United States	269	
Chi'Lantro BBQ	Korean-Mexican fusion cuisine	United States (Austin area)	5	
Chipotle Mexican Grill	Mexican	United States	2,250	
Chopt	Salads	United States	58	
City Barbeque	Barbecue	United States	41	
Corner Bakery Cafe	Cafe and baked goods	United States	192	
Così	Breakfast and lunch	United States	66	
Country Cookin	Fast casual	United States	13	
Country Style	Breakfast and lunch	Canada	400	
Cousins Subs	Sandwiches	United States	97	Milwaukee, Wisconsin-based
Crispers	Fast casual	United States	24	
Culver's	Fast casual	United States	694	
Daphne's Greek Cafe	Fast casual	United States	60	
Darshini	South Indian cuisine	India	120	
Dave's Hot Chicken	Memphis-style hot chicken	United States	283	
Dig Inn	Fast casual	United States	26	
Donatos Pizza	Pizza	United States	200	Pizza delivery service
East of Chicago Pizza	Pizza	United States	80	
Eatsa	Quinoa bowls	United States (California)	2	Automat-style self-serve ordering process; owned by Keenwawa
Edo Japan	Japanese cuisine	Canada, United States	105	Established in 1979
El Chico	Tex-Mex	United States	78	
El Meson Sandwiches	Sandwiches	Puerto Rico, United States	37	
El Pollo Loco (Mexico)	Chicken only	Mexico	50+	Not affiliated with the similarly named US company
El Pollo Loco (United States)	Chicken and Tex-Mex	United States	480+	Not affiliated with the similarly named Mexican company
El Taco Tote	Tex-Mex	United States	23	
Elevation Burger	Burgers	United States, worldwide	50	
Erbert & Gerbert's	Sandwiches	United States	50	
EXKi	Fast casual	Belgium, worldwide	86	
Extreme Pita	Pita sandwiches	United States, Canada	175	
Fairwood	Fast casual	Hong Kong	98	
Fast Eddys	Cafe	Australia	51	
Fatburger	Burgers and fries	United States, worldwide	200+	
Fazoli's	Italian-American cuisine	United States	217	
Firehouse Subs	Fast casual sandwiches	United States, worldwide	1,160	
Five Guys	Fast casual burgers	United States, Canada, Europe, Asia	1,500+	
Flunch	Cafeteria	France	200	Cafeteria-style restaurants
Flying Star	Fast casual	United States	9	
Foosackly's	Chicken	United States	12	
Freddy's Frozen Custard & Steakburgers	Fast casual	United States	300+	
Freshii	Fast casual	Canada	370	
Fryer's	Fast casual	Canada, worldwide	50+	
Fuddruckers	American, family, grill	United States, Canada, Italy, Chile, Poland, Mexico, Panama, Puerto Rico	223	
Furr's	Family	United States	21	Buffet-style restaurants
Fuzzy's Taco Shop	Tex-Mex	United States	150+	
Genghis Grill	Mongolian barbecue	United States	100	
Gino's Pizza and Spaghetti	Italian-American cuisine	United States	40	Also shared with Tudor's Biscuit World
Giordano's Pizzeria	Pizza	United States	21	
Godfather's Pizza	Pizza	United States	571	
Gold Star Chili	Chili	United States	321	
Golden Chick	Chicken	United States	180	
Guthrie's	Fast casual	United States	28	
Guzman y Gomez	Mexican-Australian	Australia, Singapore, Japan	107	
Gyoza no Ohsho	Gyōza	Japan	700	
The Habit Burger Grill	Burgers	United States	372	
The Halal Guys	Halal	United States, worldwide	200	
Halo Burger	Burgers	United States	8	Based in Central Michigan
Hamburguesas El Corral	Hamburgers	Colombia	208	
Hattie B's Hot Chicken	Chicken	United States	6	
Hell Pizza	Pizza	New Zealand	64	Formerly had international locations in Australia, Canada, United Kingdom, Ireland, India, and South Korea
Honey Jam Cafe	Breakfast and lunch	United States	3	
Hot Chicken Takeover	Chicken	United States	3	
Hot Head Burritos	Mexican	Eastern United States, mainly Ohio	79	
Illegal Pete's	Mission burrito	United States	11	
Jason's Deli	Sandwiches	United States	268	
Jerry's Subs & Pizza	Sandwiches, pizza	United States	28	
Jersey Mike's Subs	Sandwiches	United States	1973	
Jimmy the Greek	Greek cuisine	Canada	65	First founded in 1985 by Jim Antonopoulos from Greece
Joella's Hot Chicken	Louisvile-style hot chicken	United States	9	
Jollibee	Chicken	Asia, North America, Europe	1,200+	
Just Salad	Salads	United States	100	Privately owned
Kenny Rogers Roasters	Chicken	Asia, worldwide	156	Formerly based in the United States
Kogi Korean BBQ	Korean-Mexican fusion cuisine	United States (Los Angeles area)	2	Two physical locations plus five food trucks
Koni Store	Japanese food	Brazil, Portugal	32	
Kopp's Frozen Custard	Custard and burgers	United States	3	
L&L Hawaiian Barbecue	Asian and Hawaiian cuisine	United States, worldwide	200+	
La Bamba Mexican Restaurant	Tex-Mex	United States	8	
La Bou	Cafe and bakery	United States	26	
La Madeleine	Cafe and bakery	United States	86	
La Salsa	Tex-Mex	United States	23	Not to be confused with Australia-based Salsa's Fresh Mex Grill
Leeann Chin	American Chinese	United States	50+	
Leon Restaurants	Breakfast, lunch and dinner	United Kingdom	53	Founded in 2004
Little Greek Restaurants	Greek cuisine	United States	23	
Manchu Wok	Chinese cuisine	United States, Canada	200	
Marco's Pizza	Pizza	United States	800	
Matsuya Foods	Gyūdon, donburi and curry	Japan, China	1,080	
McAlister's Deli	Fast casual	United States	400	
Meatheads Burgers & Fries	Burgers & fries	United States	17	
Miami Subs Grill	Sandwiches, grill	International	31	
Michel's Patisserie	Cafe and bakery	Australia, worldwide	360	
MOD Pizza	Pizza	United States	400+	
Moe's Southwest Grill	Mexican	United States	680+	
Mooyah	Burgers	United States	100	
MOS Burger	Burgers	Japan, worldwide	1,730	
Nando's	Chicken	South Africa, worldwide	1,000	
Nathan's Famous	Hot dogs	United States	1,400	
Native Foods Cafe	Fast casual	United States	100	Vegetarian-style
Newk's Eatery	Coffeehouse	United States	100+	
Noodles & Company	Fast casual restaurant	United States	410	Fast casual restaurant that specializes in American and international noodle dishes
Noon Mediterranean	Fast casual	United States	20	
Ono Hawaiian BBQ	Hawaiian hot plate	United States	120	
Pancheros Mexican Grill	Tex-Mex	United States	71	
Panera Bread	Bakery-Café	United States, Canada	2,000+	
Papa Gino's	Italian-American cuisine	United States, worldwide	97	The holding company for D'Angelo Grilled Sandwiches also
Paradise Bakery & Café	Cafe and baked goods	United States	60	Now a subsidiary of Panera Bread
Pastamania	Pastas	Singapore, worldwide	800	
Paul	Cafe and bakery	France, worldwide	677	Based in France
Pei Wei Asian Diner	Asian	United States	200	
Penn Station	Cheesesteaks	United States	300+	
Pepper Lunch	Steak	Japan, worldwide	226	
Piada Italian Street Food	Italian-American cuisine	United States	40	Established in 2010
Piccolo Cafe	Fast casual	United States, Asia	4	
Pick Up Stix	Chinese	United States (California)	70+	Owned by Lorne Goldberg, the owner of Leeann Chin and Mandarin Express
Pie Five	Pizza	United States	100+	
Pieology	Pizza	United States, Mexico	140	
Pizza Fusion	Pizza	United States	13	
Pizza Nova	Pizza	Canada	140	
Pizzaiolo	Pizza	Canada	41	
Pizza Ranch	Pizza	United States	216	
Pizza Studio	Pizza	United States, Brazil, Canada, Philippines	26	
Pollo Tropical	Caribbean	United States	140+	
Portillo's Restaurants	Chicago-style	United States	60	
Potbelly Sandwich Shop	Fast casual	United States	413	
Pret a Manger	Sandwiches	United Kingdom, worldwide	450+	
Primo Hoagies	Fast casual	United States	95	
Prince's Hot Chicken Shack	Chicken	United States	2	Founded in 1945
Qdoba	Mexican	United States	729	
Quiznos	Sandwiches	United States, worldwide	800	
Ramen Street	Ramen noodles	Japan	8	Currently located at underground malls
Rax Roast Beef	Sandwiches	United States	8	At one time, the chain had over 200 locations in 25 states.
Ribs & Burgers	Gourmet burgers & ribs	Australia	17	
Rossopomodoro	Pizza	Italy, worldwide	103	
Rubio's	Tex-Mex	United States	200	
Saladworks	Salads	United States	100	
Salsa's Fresh Mex Grill	Mexican	Australia	50+	
Sandella's Flatbread Café	Sandwiches	United States, worldwide	130	
Saxbys Coffee	Coffeehouse	United States	25	
Sbarro	New York-style pizza	United States	800	
Schlotzsky's	Sandwiches	United States	350	
Serrano	Nordic Tex-Mex	Iceland, Sweden	10	
Shake Shack	Fast casual	United States	200	
Shakey's Pizza	Pizza	United States and Asia	500	
Shane's Rib Shack	BBQ	United States	10	
Slapfish	Seafood	United States	11	
Slim Chickens	Chicken	United States	69	
Smashburger	Fast casual	United States	370	
Sonic Drive-In	Drive-in restaurants	United States	3,557	Now owned by Arby's parent, Inspire Brands, as of 2018
Spoleto	Italian cuisine	Brazil, worldwide	267+	
Steak Escape	Sandwiches	United States, worldwide	100+	Specializes in cheesesteak sandwiches
Stir Crazy	Asian stir-fry cuisine	United States	4	
Submarina	Sandwiches	United States	50	
Subway	Sandwiches	United States, worldwide	42,431	
Sukiya	Gyūdon	Japan, worldwide	2333	
Sushirrito	Sushi and burritos	United States	8	
Sweetgreen	Fast casual	United States	75	
Taco Cabana	Tex-Mex	United States	176	
Taco del Mar	Tex-Mex	United States	260	
Taziki's Mediterranean Café	Fast casual	United States	82	
Togo's	Sandwiches	United States	200	Formerly operated alongside Dunkin' Donuts and Baskin-Robbins
Toks	Fast casual	Mexico	200	
The Training Table	Fast casual	United States	5	
Tropical Smoothie Cafe	Smoothies	United States	700	
Tudor's Biscuit World	Breakfast and lunch	United States	100	Also shared with Gino's Pizza and Spaghetti
Umami Burger	Gourmet burgers	United States, worldwide	25	
Uncle Maddio's Pizza Joint	Pizza	United States	38	
Upper Crust	Cafe and baked goods	United Kingdom, worldwide	100	
Upper Crust Pizzeria	Pizza	United States	9	
Vapiano	Italian	Germany and 26 other countries	180	
VeganBurg	Fast casual	United States, Singapore	2	Vegetarian-style
Veggie Grill	Fast casual	United States	29	Vegetarian-style
Wahoo's Fish Taco	Tex-Mex	United States	100	
Wayback Burgers	Burgers	United States	133	
Which Wich?	Sandwiches	United States	431	
Wild Willy's	Hamburgers	United States	5	
Xi'an Famous Foods	Chinese food	United States	12	
YO! Sushi	Sushi	United Kingdom, worldwide	100	
Yoshinoya	Noodle bowls	Asia and United States	1,100+	
Your Pie	Pizza	United States	58	
Zankou Chicken	Armenian Mediterranean	United States	12	
Zaxby's	Chicken	United States	800	
Zippy's	Fast casual	United States	24	Based on the inspiration of the brothers' car wash failure

== Nearly defunct former casual restaurant chains ==
This list contains chains that were much larger in the past, with some having several hundred locations at their peak, which have since been reduced to a single location.

Name	Type	Location(s)	Number of locations	Notes
The Brothers Three	Pizza	Wisconsin	1 (7 at peak)	Founded in 1972. At one time, had up to seven locations.
Chi-Chi's	Mexican	Formerly United States, now single location in Austria	1 (130 at peak)	At one time, it was the largest Mexican restaurant chain in the United States with 130 locations worldwide before bankruptcy forced sale of U.S. locations to Outback Steakhouse. All that remains of the former chain by the second decade of the 21st century is a single franchised location in Vienna.
Du-par's	Restaurant and bakery	United States (Southern California)	1 (6 at peak)	Scenes from the 1983 movie Valley Girl were filmed at their Studio City location
Horne's	Southern-style	United States	1 (60 at peak)	Many were located near gas stations by highways
Jerry's Restaurants	Family	United States	1 (~50 at peak)	Was much larger, but sold most locations to Denny's in 1980s; was also parent company of Long John Silver's
Lone Star Steakhouse & Saloon	Steakhouse	Formerly United States, currently Guam	1 (267 at peak)	Last remaining location is in Guam
Timber Lodge Steakhouse	Steakhouse	United States	1 (85 at peak)	
York Steak House	Steakhouse	United States	1 (200 at peak)	At one time had nearly 200 locations

== Defunct chains ==
Name	Type	Location(s)	Peak number of locations	Notes
Arab Udupi	Indian	United Arab Emirates	15	In Abu Dhabi and other locations; Udupi cuisine
Bikinis Sports Bar & Grill	Sports bar	United States	14	
Bill Knapp's	Family	United States	60	
Blue Boar Cafeterias	Cafeteria	United States	21	
Bugaboo Creek Steakhouse	Steakhouse	United States, Worldwide	30	
Cheeseburger in Paradise	Burgers and margaritas	United States	23	At its peak, the chain had locations in 14 states. Named after the Jimmy Buffett song "Cheeseburger in Paradise".
China Coast	American Chinese	United States	51	Owned by General Mills and later Darden
Clifton's Cafeteria	Cafeteria	United States	10	Replaced by bar called Clifton's Republic in 2018
Coon Chicken Inn	Chicken	United States	3	Located in the Western United States during the early 20th century. Its trademark was a smiling blackface caricature of an African-American porter. The chain folded by mid-century due to its cultural and racial offensiveness.
Don Pablo's	Tex-Mex	United States	120	
Eatza Pizza	Pizza	United States	115	Ended in 2008
Elephant Bar	Scratch kitchen bars	United States	25	
ESPN Zone	Casual dining	United States	2	Sports-themed
Farrell's Ice Cream Parlour	Ice cream and sandwiches	United States	120	1900-themed ice cream parlor that also served sandwiches and was known for its theatrics when serving extremely large sized ice cream treats such as the Pig's Trough, Volcano and Zoo to accompaniment of drums, whistles, sirens and singing staff.
Fashion Cafe	Fashion-themed	United States, England, South Africa, Mexico, Spain	5	Fashion-themed restaurant chain that was backed by famous supermodels such as Naomi Campbell, Elle Macpherson, Claudia Schiffer, and Christy Turlington
Fresh Choice	Buffet	United States	50	
Hamburger Hamlet	Gourmet hamburgers	United States	24	Had locations in Los Angeles, Chicago, and Washington DC metro areas. Movie and TV actors frequented the original Hollywood location.
Harvey House	Casual	United States	84	Company originally started in 1876 as a chain of railroad eating houses along the Atchison, Topeka and Santa Fe Railway which later evolved into a chain of casual roadway restaurants along U.S. Highways and state tollroads before the growth of interstate highways finally killed the business.
Hen House Restaurants	Casual	United States	40	Had locations near interstate highways.
Howard Johnson's	Family	United States	1,000+ at peak	One of the first restaurant chains. At one time, had over 1,000 locations across the U.S. Final location closed in 2022.
How Do You Roll?	Sushi	United States	12	
JB's Restaurants	Family	United States	104	A Big Boy franchise until 1987. One restaurant in the chain was named "Galaxy Diner".
Koo Koo Roo	Chicken	United States	38	Owned by Luby's
Lee Roy Selmon's	Casual dining	United States	3	Its original location closed in 2018 after 17 years.
Little Chef	Roadside restaurants	United Kingdom	439	Ended in 2018
Lum's	Family	United States	273	
Mao	Asian cuisine	Ireland	9	Last location closed in 2024.
Morrison's Cafeteria	Cafeteria	United States	151	
Mr. Steak	Steakhouse	United States, Canada	282	
Nickerson Farms	Family	United States	6	Usually found near interstate highways
Official All Star Café	Sports-themed	United States	10	Partially owned by Planet Hollywood International
Pasta Bravo	Pizza and Pasta	United States	16	Owned by Yum! Brands
Piccadilly Pub	Bar & grill	United States (Massachusetts)	13	
Pizza Corner	Pizza	India	70	Ended in 2014
Richtree Market	Casual dining	Canada	11	Ended in 2020
Rio Bravo Cantina	Mexican	United States	100	Ended in 2002
Roadhouse Grill	Steakhouse	United States	20	
The Royal Canadian Pancake Houses	Pancake house	United States	5	
Rustler Steak House	Steakhouse	United States	110+	Ended in 1984
Sambo's	Family	United States	1,000+	The chain mostly ended in the early 1980s due to financial mismanagement. At around the same time, disaffection with the name "Sambo's", which was viewed as racially derogatory, led to some locations being rebranded with names including "No Place Like Sam's" and "Jolly Tiger". By 1984, all but one location was either closed or sold to other chains, including Bakers Square and Denny's. The one remaining Sambo's location was the original one, in Santa Barbara; in 2020 it was renamed to Chad's.
ShopHouse Southeast Asian Kitchen	Asian	United States	15	Owned by Chipotle; an attempt into the Asian fast casual restaurant industry
ShowBiz Pizza Place	Pizza	United States	90	Started in 1980 as a direct competitor to Chuck E. Cheese. In 1984, the company that owned ShowBiz Pizza Place bought the Chuck E. Cheese chain, and in 1992 all ShowBiz Pizza Place locations were rebranded as Chuck E. Cheese.
Sisters Chicken & Biscuits	Chicken and biscuits	United States	79	Wendy's chicken restaurant subsidiary that existed during the mid-1980s
Soul Daddy	Soul food	United States	3	Once owned by Chipotle Mexican Grill; its creation was the prize for its founder in winning the reality show America's Next Great Restaurant
Souplantation	Buffet	United States	104	Operated as Sweet Tomatoes outside California; the chain filed for Chapter 7 Bankruptcy on May 7, 2020, and closed permanently on May 8, 2020, due to losses and health and safety concerns caused by the COVID-19 pandemic with salad bars and buffets.
Steak and Ale	Steakhouse	United States	58	Ended in 2008
Taybarns	Buffet	United Kingdom	7	Ended in 2016
Toddle House	Family	United States	40	
Tom's BaoBao	Bao	United States	2	Owned by a Chinese chain called Ganqishi. Closed in 2020.
Valle's Steak House	Steakhouse	United States	32	
Victoria Station	Steakhouse, BBQ	United States (northeastern)	100	Brand still exists in Japan, but owned by a different company
VIP's	Family	United States (western)	53	Oregon-based chain that operated in five western states; not to be confused with a chain of the same name (but without an apostrophe) in Mexico operated by Walmart de México y Centroamérica
Wag's	Family	United States	90+	Once owned by Walgreens
Zoës Kitchen	Fast casual	United States	258	Merged into Cava

== See also ==
- Fast casual restaurant
- List of defunct restaurants of the United States
- List of buffet restaurants
- List of coffeehouse chains
- List of fast food restaurant chains
- List of hamburger restaurants
- List of ice cream parlor chains
- List of pizza chains
- List of restaurant chains
- Lists of restaurants
- List of revolving restaurants
- Types of restaurant
