= List of companies based in Westport, Connecticut =

This is a list of large or well-known interstate or international companies in the Westport, Connecticut area. As of December 2011, Westport was home to one Fortune 500 company: construction equipment manufacturer Terex (#402).

== Companies currently headquartered in Westport, Connecticut ==
=== Charity ===
- Save the Children

=== Food ===
- Newman's Own Inc
- Eatza Pizza

=== Investment management ===
- Bridgewater Associates LP

=== Marketing & Media ===
- Connoisseur Media
- Labate Marketing - Marketing & Consulting Firm
- dLife - multimedia diabetes education (and marketing) company with a weekly television program on CNBC

== Companies formerly headquartered in Westport ==
- Business Express Airlines
- Pequot Capital Management - investment management
- Playtex Products Inc. - feminine, infant, and skin care products
- Terex Corp - #402 on the Fortune 500; construction and farm machinery
