= Redstone American Grill =

American restaurant chain

- Type: Private
- Industry: Restaurants
- Founded: Minnetonka, Minnesota (1999)
- Founder: Dean Vlahos
- Headquarters: Wayzata, Minnesota, U.S.
- Website: redstonegrill.com

Redstone American Grill is an American restaurant chain with locations in several of the U.S. states. The company is positioned between upscale restaurants and more casual chains such as TGI Fridays. The company was founded by Dean Vlahos in 1999 and the first location opened six months later in Minnetonka, Minnesota in September 1999. There are currently ten locations.

== History ==
Dean Vlahos, founder of the Champps Restaurant & Bar chain, founded Redstone American Grill in 1999 in the city of Wayzata, Minnesota. The initial restaurant, which opened several months later in September 1999 in Minnetonka, Minnesota, generated strong sales. By 2008 the chain had grown to five locations in four states with a sixth in the planning stages. Revenues exceed those of most competitors. Single store sales averaged US$6.7 million annually in 2004, and chain-wide sales exceed $30 million annually. The target customer includes upscale professionals in upper middle class affluent sub-urban areas. The restaurants are modeled after other upscale chains Houstons and Bandera Grill and feature open spaces around a central bar and an open kitchen with a wood-burning grill and rotisserie.

== Menu ==
The company markets itself as a high end barbecue restaurant that features steak, chicken, pork and fish cooked on a wood fired grill. Zagat Survey reviews of the fare are mostly positive, with one commenter stating it had an "Interesting menu including very expensive steaks to reasonably priced chicken and ribs... Restaurant Review magazine gave the chain high marks in quality and taste for its entrees and appetizers.

== Tom Petters ==
Tom Petters, the CEO of Petters Group Worldwide and a friend of Vlahos, was a minority stake holder with 16% of the company. He was arrested in late 2007 by federal officials on charges he was running a US$3 billion Ponzi scheme. While not affecting the company's operations, Petters scheme severely affected the personal fortune of Valhos and hurt Redstone's standing in the financial community and complicated a company reorganization occurring at the same time. Company CEO David Goronkin issued a statement about the issue in which he denied that reorganization was caused by the charges; "It does not involve Redstone whatsoever", he said. "Redstone is reorganizing because of the dry-up of the credit market. It has nothing to do with Petters. … I will continue to build Redstones and I’ll continue to do other projects. We’ll move forward".

However, the damage to the company's reputation accompanied by the 2008–2009 recession has put dampeners on Redstone's expansion plans. GE Capital, a major source of funding for a planned 200–300 unit expansion, pulled a promised $10 million loan, while Gronkin resigned from his position as CEO. In all the company's sales declined 2.2% in 2008, primarily due to recessionary pressures on its prime clientele base of the sub-urban professional. Analysts are however positive on the loss, noting that comparable chains such as Morton's Restaurant Group and McCormick & Schmick's have seen losses in the 10-15% range.
