= Mr. Steak =

American steakhouse restaurant chain

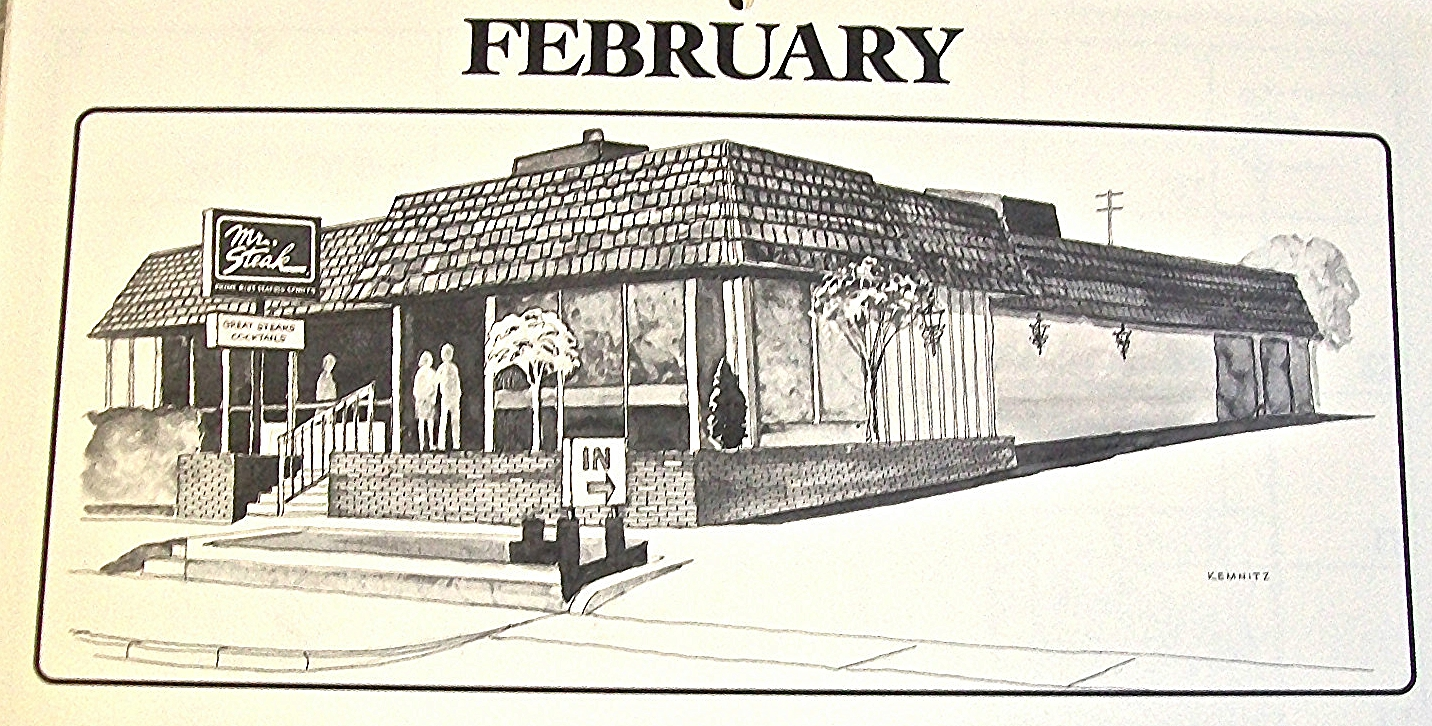
- Mr. Steak, Ann Arbor, Michigan, from the Junior League Ann Arbor calendar, 1985-86.
- Industry: Restaurant
- Founded: 1962; 64 years ago in Colorado Springs, Colorado
- Founder: James A. Mather
- Defunct: 2009
- Fate: Bankruptcy
- Headquarters: Colorado Springs, Colorado
- Area served: United States, Canada
- Products: Steak, Salad
- Parent: Jamco Ltd. (???–1992); Omnivest International (1992–???)

Mr. Steak was an American steakhouse restaurant chain started in 1962 by James A. Mather in Colorado Springs, Colorado. At its peak, the chain operated 278 restaurants throughout the United States. The chain saw a decline in the 1980s when it attempted to diversify its menu options, drawing focus away from the steak in favor of fish, salads, and chicken.

== History ==
In June 1981, Richard S. Jackson replaced James C. Shearon as president and chief operating officer of the Denver-based Mr. Steak Inc. while James A. Mather continued as chairman and chief executive officer. At the time of the announcement, there were 258 Mr. Steak restaurants, most of them franchised. Jackson was later replaced as president and chief operating officer by Michael T. Fuller in September 1984. After acquiring nearly $2 million in debts, Littleton-based Jamco Ltd., the parent firm of the Mr. Steak restaurant chain, filed for Chapter 11 reorganization under the U.S. Bankruptcy Code. At the time of the filing, Randall Pike had replaced Mathers as chairman and CEO and the company had 122 franchise Mr. Steak restaurants and the 25 company-owned operations in 36 states and Canada. The company incurred an enormous debt by "co-signed leases with a lot of franchise operators that didn't make it."

In April 1992, a Denver investment company called Omnivest International purchased the remaining assets of Jamco from the Denver bankruptcy court for $140,000 and assuming liabilities of about $260,000, which included 57 Mr. Steak restaurants in 23 states, all of which were franchised. In 1993, Omnivest attempted to revitalize the brand by introducing the more upscale "Mr. Steak's Firegrill" concept.

Locations in central and western Michigan were converted in 1991 to a new chain called Finley's, which retained most of the Mr. Steak menu following the chain's early-1990s demise.

The final Mr. Steak closed in 2009 in St. Charles, Missouri. The building was razed in July 2022.

== See also ==
- Steak burger
- List of casual dining restaurant chains § Former casual restaurants
