= Noon Mediterranean =

Austin-based fast casual restaurant chain

- Type: Private
- Industry: Restaurant chain
- Founded: 2011; 15 years ago in Austin, Texas as Verts Mediterranean Grill
- Founders: Michael Heyne, Dominik Stein
- Defunct: 2018
- Fate: Bankrupt; acquired by Daphne's Greek Cafe
- Headquarters: New York, New York
- Area served: Texas, Massachusetts, Pennsylvania

Noon Mediterranean (formerly VERTS Mediterranean Grill and VERTS KEBAP) was an Austin-based fast casual restaurant chain. The company created the world's smallest food truck out of a Smart Car in 2011. In May 2016, it was rated ninth on Restaurant Business Online's list of Top 25 Fastest-Growing Fast Casuals. As of November 2017, Noon had 20 locations in the United States. Noon co-founder Dominik Stein was included on Forbes' "30 Under 30" list under the Food & Drink category in 2017.

== History ==
Verts was founded in 2011 by two University of Texas and WHU - Otto Beisheim School of Management alumni, Michael Heyne and Dominik Stein, to recreate popular food from Europe which was not available in America.

In February 2014, the chain announced it would be expanding into Houston. In October 2014, Verts entered an agreement to open three locations in Dallas–Fort Worth. Verts opened its first San Antonio location in September 2015. In December 2015, the company brought in $20 million in private equity, which would be used to expand the restaurant to the east coast. The first Plano location opened in April 2016. Poets & Quants named Verts one of the Top MBA Startups in January 2016.

In September 2016, Verts announced a new location in Center City, Philadelphia, which opened in March 2017. In November 2016, Verts opened a new location in Boston and announced a New York City location. Two more Boston locations were announced in February 2017, and a location in Washington D.C. was announced that March. Also in March 2017, Verts was featured on CNBC's list of 10 hot restaurant brands to watch. In July 2017, Yelp showed that a total of 11 Texas locations were closed, including five in and around Austin, all three in San Antonio, and three in cities surrounding Dallas/Ft. Worth.

In November 2017, Verts was rebranded as Noon Mediterranean.

Noon filed for bankruptcy on August 6, 2018 and was acquired by the parent company of Daphne's Greek Cafe on October 7, 2018. Noon restaurants were rebranded as Daphne's in 2019; however, they were shuttered in late July 2019.
