= Taziki's Mediterranean Café =

American restaurant chain

Taziki's Café
- Type: Private
- Industry: Fast casual restaurant chain
- Founded: 1998; 28 years ago
- Founders: Keith and Amy Richards
- Headquarters: Birmingham, Alabama, United States
- Number of locations: 109 (November 2025)
- Area served: United States
- Products: Greek cuisine and Mediterranean cuisine
- Owners: Keith and Amy Richards
- Website: www.tazikis.com

Taziki's Mediterranean Café is an American fast-casual restaurant chain specializing in Greek and Mediterranean cuisine, including gyros, sandwiches, salads, and soups. The company is headquartered in Birmingham, Alabama, and operates more than 100 locations across 18 U.S. states through a mix of corporate- and franchise-owned restaurants.

== History ==
In 1997, Keith and Amy Richards took a trip to Greece. While there, they visited a small cafe run by a Greek couple. Keith and Amy fell in love with the small-table feel, the fresh food and the culture of hospitality.

Upon their return to the United States, Keith began plans to open his own Mediterranean café in the Richards' hometown of Birmingham, Alabama. While searching for a name, the Richards looked back on the pictures that Keith had taken, and found one of Amy standing next to a menu board that read "tzatziki", a traditional Greek dip. In order to make it easier for their customers, they dropped two letters to form the name Taziki's.

The first Taziki's opened in March 1998 in the Colonnade Office Park in Birmingham. It was met with positive reviews and early success, prompting the Richards to open two other stores in Birmingham.

== Menu ==
Taziki's Mediterranean Café serves Mediterranean-inspired cuisine prepared fresh daily. Most proteins are grilled over an open flame, vegetables are chopped daily and served fresh or roasted, and the majority of sauces, dressings, and sides are made from scratch in house. The company promotes its cooking method as "crafted, not processed" and highlights the absence of fryers and microwaves as a core operational distinction.

Central to the brand identity is a food philosophy built on "ingredients you can trust".

Signature Mediterranean ingredients, including Greek olive oil, Kalamata olives, roasted red peppers, and select spices are imported from the regions where they are traditionally grown.

The chain maintains long-standing partnerships with American family farmers for produce and lamb, Hellas Bakery for traditional baklava, and Mediterranean Bread Company for pita bread.

The restaurant serves salads, gyros, bowls, appetizers, and desserts.

== Franchising and expansion ==
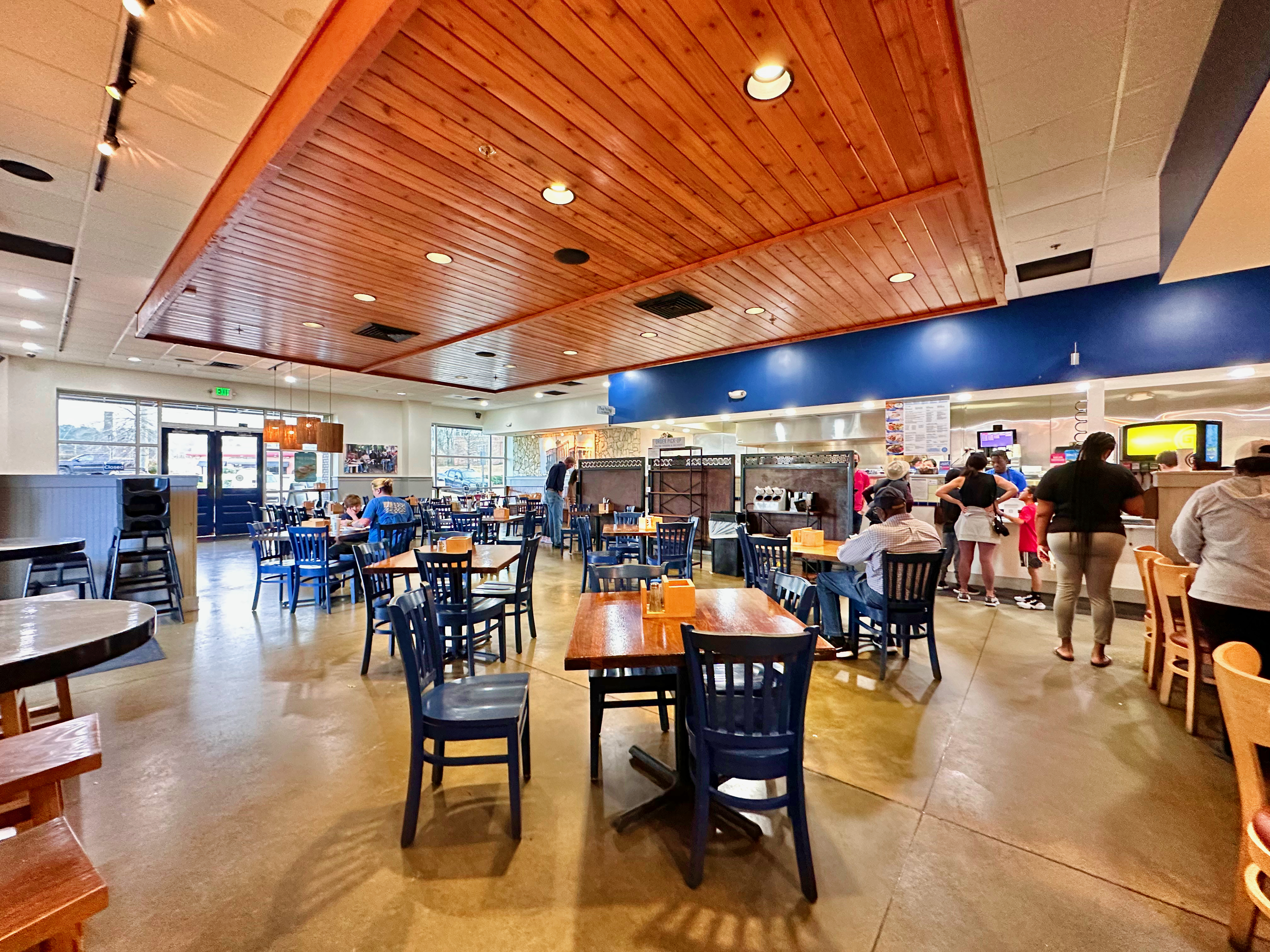
The interior of a Taziki's Mediterranean Café in Trussville, Alabama

Taziki's began franchising in 2013, expanding the brand beyond Alabama. Growth initially focused on the Southeastern United States before extending into regions such as Texas, Colorado, and Florida. By 2025, the brand had more than 100 locations across 18 states.

Dan Simpson, who has served as CEO since 2018, has overseen the company’s expansion strategy, emphasizing unit economics, franchise development, menu innovation, and digital ordering. Current priorities include expansion into the Midwest, Mid-Atlantic, and Southwest regions.

== Business model ==
Taziki's operates under a franchise model combining corporate oversight with locally owned restaurants. Franchisees manage daily operations, while the company provides menu development, training, marketing, and supply-chain services.

Franchise owners pay a 4% royalty fee and a 0.75% national marketing fee that support brand-wide advertising and digital marketing initiatives.

The initial franchise fee is $35,000, with discounted pricing for multi-unit development agreements.

As of November 2025, estimated start-up costs range from $555,000 to $1.01 million.

== Operations ==
Many Taziki's locations offer dine-in, takeout, catering, and digital ordering services. Menu preparation emphasizes fresh vegetables, grilled proteins, and house-made sauces.

The company uses technology systems including Square for Restaurants for point-of-sale operations, Restaurant365 for restaurant management, Kalibrate for real-estate analytics, and Axonify for digital training. Management training includes an eight-week program for franchise operators.

== Community involvement ==
Taziki's participates in community outreach through local partnerships, school programs, and charitable initiatives. Its HOPE (Herbs Offering Personal Enrichment) program provides employment opportunities for individuals with disabilities, supporting herb cultivation and culinary-related activities.

The company also partners with organizations such as The Giving Kitchen, which provides assistance to food-service workers in need. Many franchise locations engage in local nonprofit collaborations.

== See also ==
- List of casual dining restaurant chains
- List of Greek restaurants
