= Azzip Pizza =

American pizza restaurant chain

Azzip Pizza, LLC
- Type: Private company
- Industry: Restaurants
- Founded: 2014; 12 years ago in Evansville, Indiana, U.S.
- Founders: Brad Niemeier (CEO)
- Headquarters: Evansville, Indiana
- Number of locations: 13 (December 2025)
- Area served: Indiana, Kentucky
- Key people: Blake Kollker (Director of Growth and Development), Dan Niemeier (Director of Operations), Craig Niemeier (Director of Field Operations), Laura Niemeier (Accounting), Andy Niemeier (Co-CEO)
- Products: Pizza
- Website: www.azzippizza.com

Azzip Pizza, LLC is an American restaurant chain based in Evansville, Indiana, specializing in pizza. Azzip features unique, highly customized pizzas baked in a conveyor belt oven in front of customers. Azzip Pizza offers over 16 million variations including gluten-free and vegetarian options. Pre-created variations are sold on special occasions or as their "Pizza of the Month".

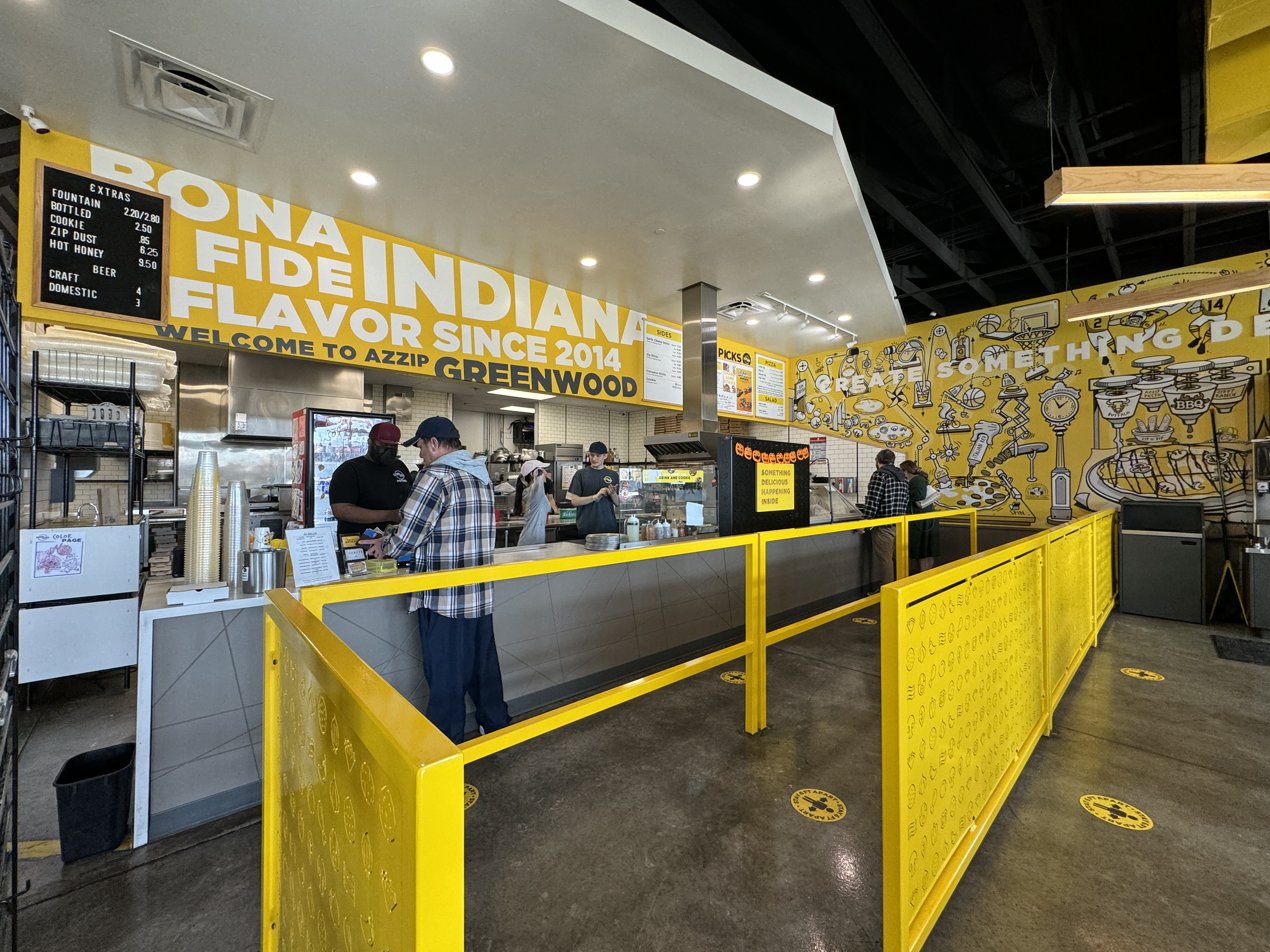
Interior of Azzip Pizza in Indianapolis, Indiana.

== History ==
Brad Niemeier founded Azzip Pizza in 2014 after having won the Burton D. Morgan Business Plan Competition at Purdue University in 2012, where he earned a Bachelor of Science degree in Hospitality and Tourism Management. After two years of research and development the first location opened in February 2014 in Evansville, Indiana. After only seven months the second location opened in Newburgh, Indiana. Niemeier's restaurant concept was resoundingly successful. The fast casual restaurant's popularity was confirmed when it was awarded "Best Restaurant Opened in 2014" by the Evansville Living magazine.

In April 2015 Azzip Pizza was the Gold Winner of the Evansville Courier & Press Readers' Choice Awards - making it the "Best Place for Pizza" in Evansville. Later that year the first Illinois location opened in Champaign, Illinois, followed by another location in Evansville.

In 2016, the management moved into its new Evansville Headquarters. Azzip Pizza's fifth and first Kentucky location opened in the summer of 2016 in Bowling Green, Kentucky, underlining the Illinois-Indiana-Kentucky tri-state area's importance to local businesses. A sixth location was opened in Terre Haute, Indiana, in the fall of 2016.

An announcement was made in June 2017 that the seventh location was being opened in Bloomington, Indiana, that was scheduled for fall 2017.

After two years of operations, Azzip closed their Champaign location in October 2017. A few days after closing the company's only Illinois location, Azzip finally opened their Bloomington location during the same month.

The firm's seventh location was opened in Lafayette, Indiana, in April 2018.

In 2025, a second location in Terre Haute opened on the city's developing eastside.

== Philanthropy ==
Azzip Pizza launched its We Give A’Zip Giveback Program in 2014 to benefit local organizations and schools.

== See also ==
- List of pizza chains of the United States
- List of casual dining restaurant chains
