= Upper Crust Pizzeria =

American pizza chain restaurant

- Company type: Privately held company
- Industry: Restaurants
- Founded: 2001; 25 years ago
- Founder: Jordan Tobins
- Headquarters: Arlington, Massachusetts, U.S.A.
- Number of locations: 3
- Area served: United States
- Key people: Quabbin Capital, Streetlight Capital Management
- Products: Pizza, calzones, fried chicken
- Website: www.theuppercrustpizzeria.com

The Upper Crust Pizzeria is an American pizzeria chain with three locations in the Boston area.

== History ==
Upper Crust was founded by Jordan Tobins in 2001. The first pizzeria opened in the Beacon Hill neighborhood on Charles Street in 2001. Josh Huggard and Brendan Higgins were co-owners from 2002 to 2012.

It grew to 14 locations, some franchised, and developed a cult following before declaring bankruptcy in 2012. The company was purchased on a 50-50 investor basis by Anthony Ackil's restaurant consulting firm, Streetlight Ventures, and Quabbin Capital, a Boston based private equity firm investing in US manufacturing and consumer goods companies.

RJ Dourney, previously CEO of Così, was CEO from 2017 to 2019. In 2020, Quabbin sold half interest in the chain to Streetlight Capital Management. Anthony Ackil, a partner in Streetlight, became CEO in 2020, restoring the original recipes and adding fried chicken to the menu.

As of March 2026, it has restaurants in Massachusetts: South End, Brookline, and Lexington.

=== Controversies ===
A United States Department of Labor investigation of the company's pay practices from April 2007 through April 2009 revealed that Upper Crust's hourly workers were paid straight time even after they exceeded 40 hours in a week. The company was ordered to pay more than US$341,000 in back wages to about 121 workers for uncompensated overtime. The Labor Department began a new investigation of the company in 2010.

On July 16, 2010, a lawsuit was filed against the company by two former employees, claiming that the Upper Crust had forced employees to give back thousands of these dollars. The lawsuit claimed that Upper Crust made illegal deductions from the plaintiff's wages, paid below the legal minimum wage, and retaliated against those who complained. The plaintiffs were described by the company as "disgruntled ex-employees... trying to figure out a way to extort money from our business", but in 2012 the company's former chief financial officer, David Marcus, swore an affidavit saying that Upper Crust had devised a scheme to take back the money awarded, which included cashing forged checks and cutting wages. Marcus had been accused of financial mishandling of the company's finances, which led to a plea agreement which included his signing an affidavit, contrary to his sworn testimony under oath, that the company attempted to take back wages in exchange for a release of liability by employees' attorney Shannon Liss-Riordan.

On December 20, 2010 a former operations manager at Upper Crust filed a lawsuit that accuses the Boston pizza chain of retaliating against him after he reported the company to the US Department of Labor for allegedly violating wage and hour laws.

In 2011, The Boston Globe reported that several former employees claimed that United States Immigration and Customs Enforcement (ICE) was investigating the company's alleged hiring of illegal immigrants and other labor violations. Labor and student groups including Massachusetts Jobs with Justice organized boycotts and protest over the company's labor practices; the company described the boycotts as misguided. The company was ultimately not charged for any wrongdoings by any of the various agencies.

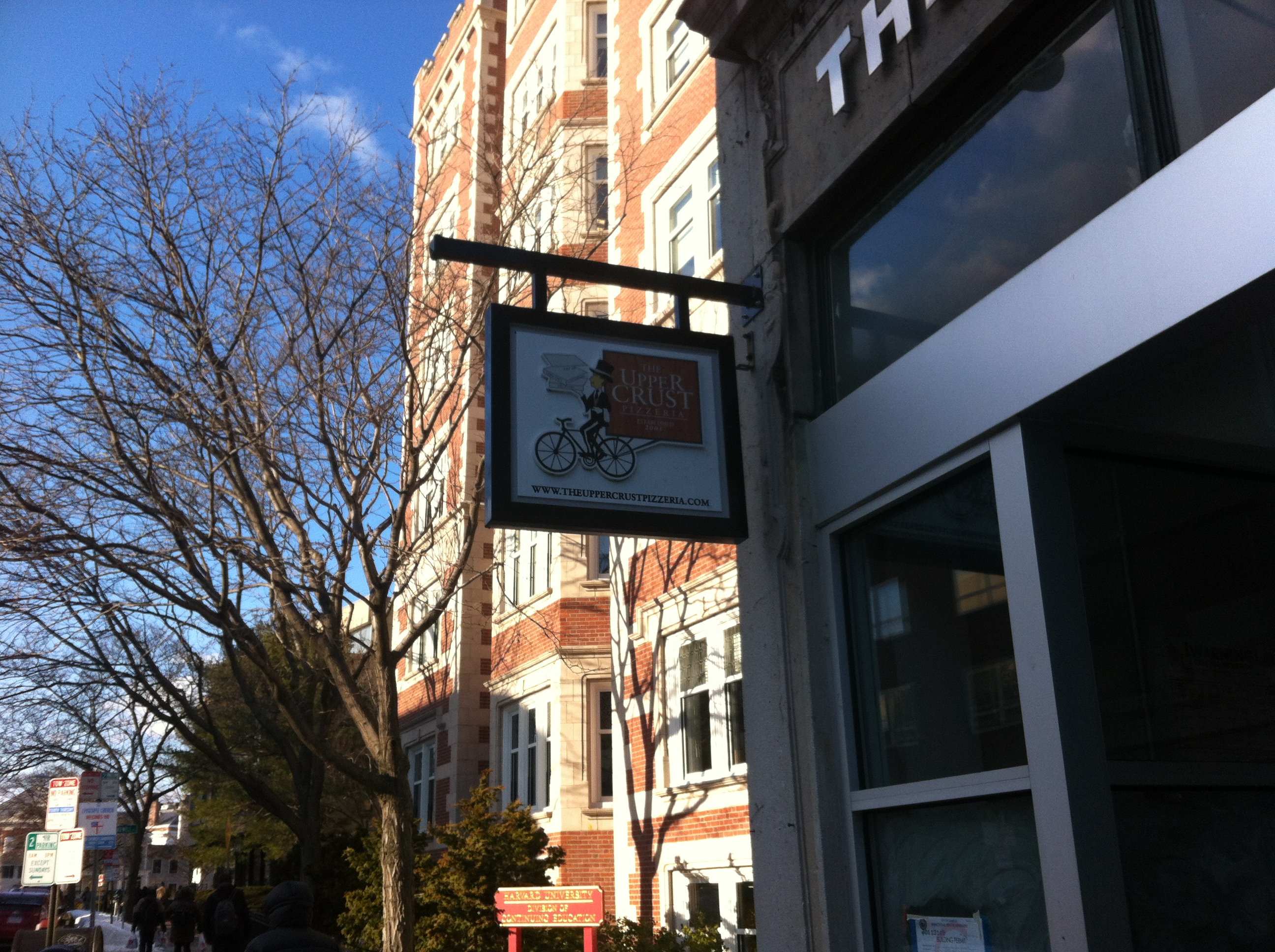
A picture of the shuttered Upper Crust Pizzeria restaurant in Cambridge, Massachusetts

In 2012, Upper Crust co-owners Joshua Huggard and Brendan Higgins sued Tobins, alleging that he had used more than $750,000 in company money for personal expenses such as the purchase of a small airplane. Tobins was placed on leave from the company, but it was eventually discovered that both Huggard and Higgins owed Tobins more than $1 million in unpaid royalties.

Tobins, Huggard and Higgins settled their lawsuit in August 2012. Under the terms of the settlement, Tobins paid Huggard and Higgins $250,000 and assumed partial liability for the class action lawsuit by former Upper Crust employees, the Department of Labor investigation, and a lawsuit by Upper Crust's construction firm. In exchange, Tobins received the rights to the Upper Crust name. Ultimately Huggard and Higgins fraudulently re-directed the settlement funds which should have been paid to ZVI Construction for their own personal expenses. Finally, Huggard and Higgins took ownership of the Upper Crust restaurants in Back Bay, Fenway, Harvard Square, Hingham, Lexington, State Street, South End, Summer Street, Waltham, Washington DC, Watertown, and Wellesley.

Huggard's and Higgins' company filed for bankruptcy in late 2012, closing all of its locations.

UC Acquisitions, a private equity firm with ties to Upper Crust founder Jordan Tobins, purchased some locations from the bankruptcy estate of Huggard's and Higgins' firm. The location in Harvard Square was subsequently purchased by attorney Shannon Liss-Riordan, who had represented the chain's employees in a lawsuit, to be re-opened as a partly employee-owned pizzeria, the Just Crust, which closed in winter 2018. Since UC Acquisitions took control of Upper Crust, many franchisees have elected to cut ties with the company. As of April 2013, Tobins or UC Acquisitions controlled the Upper Crust name and the locations in Beacon Hill, Brookline, Lexington, South End, Watertown, and Wellesley.

Jordan Tobins later settled all legal matters related to his involvement with Upper Crust, including employees' back wages and all tax liabilities with Massachusetts.
