= EXKi =

Restaurant chain

- Industry: Fast food
- Number of locations: 86
- Website: exki.com

EXKi (/ˈɛkski/) is an international chain of fast-casual "grab-and-go" restaurants. The Belgian owners have stated that the name is a play on the French word "exquis", meaning "exquisite" or "delightful".

As of October 2014, EXKi operates 70 restaurants in Belgium, France, Italy, Luxembourg, the Netherlands, and the United States.

== History ==
The concept for EXKi was developed during a 1999 reunion of three former classmates: Frederic Rouvez, Nicolas Steisel, and Arnaud de Meeûs.

On January 9, 2001, EXKi launched its inaugural restaurant in Brussels. One year later, in 2002, the company received the "Best Concept" award at the French international real estate conference, MAPIC. In 2012, the brand was awarded the "Best Food and Beverage Retail Concept" award.

In June 2014, EXKi expanded its reach by opening its first location in the United States on Park Avenue South in Manhattan.
