= Larkburger =

American restaurant chain

Larkburger was an American restaurant chain that made its food from "all-natural ingredients". It first opened in Edwards, Colorado, in 2006. Many of the restaurant's ingredients were made on-site. The restaurant was known for using wooden trays instead of plastic ones, wrapping burgers in brown paper, and placing side dishes inside cardboard boxes. This was all done to make the restaurant as organic and as eco-friendly as possible. The chain currently has three locations, with two currently open.

As of January 29, 2019, Larkburger announced a rebranding to Lark Spot, and the closure of 6 locations: Downtown Denver, Washington Park, University Hills, and Broomfield, Colorado locations as well as both of their Kansas City restaurants.
