= Wild Willy's =

American hamburger restaurant chain

Wild Willy's Burgers
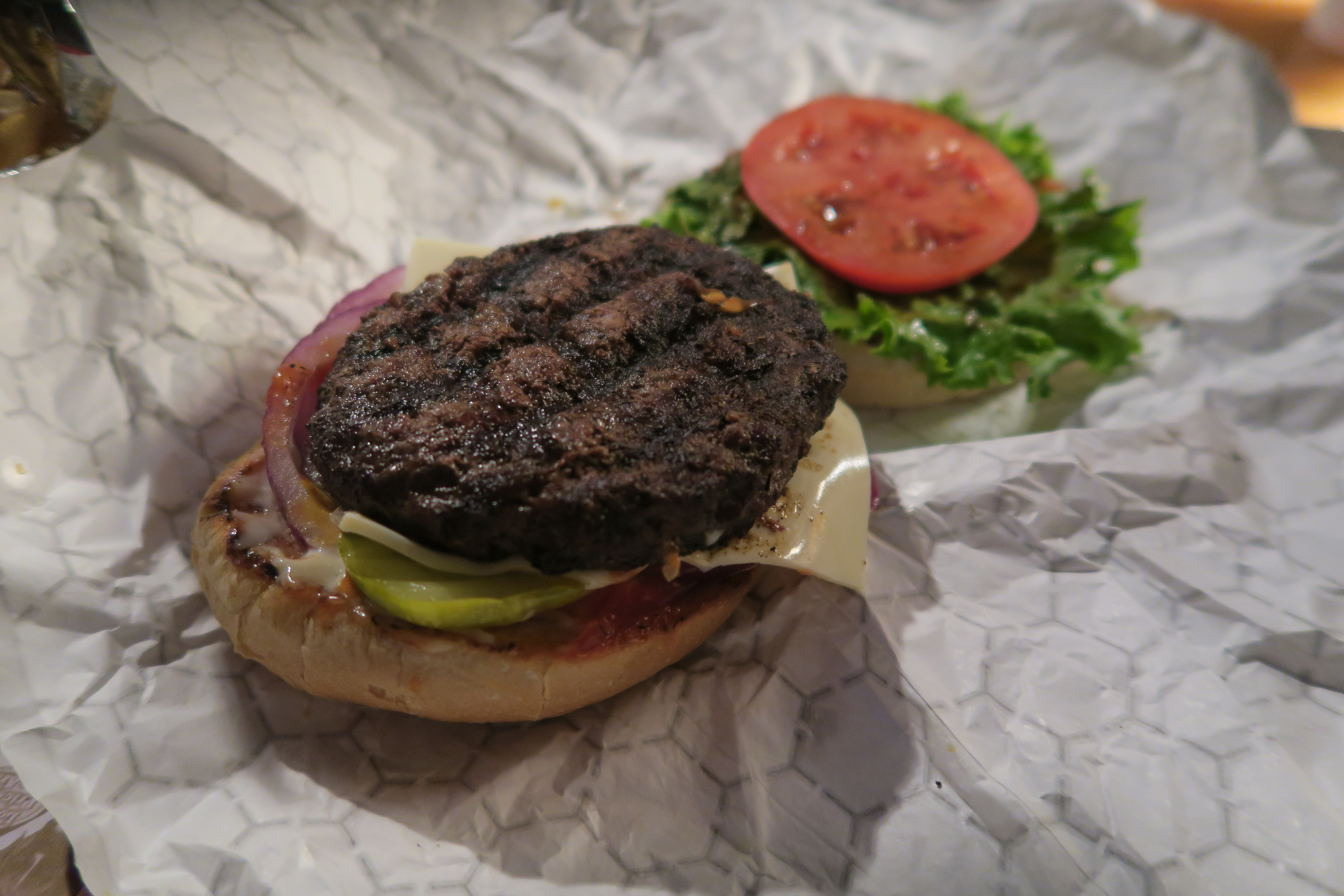
- "Willy" Burger
- Company type: Private
- Genre: Fast casual restaurant
- Founded: 2001; 25 years ago in York, Maine
- Headquarters: York, Maine, U.S.
- Number of locations: 2
- Area served: Maine, New Hampshire
- Products: Hamburgers, french fries, hot dogs, soft drinks
- Website: www.wildwillysburgers.com

Wild Willy's is a New England–based hamburger restaurant first opened in York, Maine, in 2001. It was founded by Jim Williams.
