= How Do You Roll? =

Texas fast-casual sushi restaurant

Coordinates: 30.3878°N 97.7223°W

- Type: Restaurant
- Industry: Fast casual restaurant
- Predecessor: Maki Maki, L.L.C.
- Founded: Austin, Texas October 1, 2008
- Founders: Yuen Yung; Peter Yung
- Headquarters: Austin
- Number of locations: 0 stores (Updated January 30, 2017)
- Products: Sushi Rolls
- Website: www.howdoyouroll.com

How Do You Roll? was a franchise fast-casual sushi restaurant, headquartered in Austin, Texas. The first How Do You Roll? location opened in October 2008 and the company began franchising in early 2010. As of April 2016, it had stores operating in California and Florida, but was later closed.

== History ==
Yuen Yung and his brother Peter Yung grew up in Chinatown, Manhattan. Yuen received his finance degree from the University of Texas at Austin and was as a partner at Kenty, Yung, Ozias & Associates, a financial services firm. Peter started in the restaurant business at the age of 8 by helping in his parents' restaurant after school. He grew to become an expert in Japanese cuisine. Before beginning the How Do You Roll? venture, Peter was Head Sushi Chef at Azuma Restaurant in Houston, Texas.

=== Name, Ownership, and Concept changes ===
The first HDYR location was originally named Maki but in September 2009, changed its name to How Do You Roll?. Maki Maki, L.L.C. continues to be operated by Yuen and Peter Yung as a provider of training, equipment, and supplies to franchisees.

HDYR was acquired by a private restaurant group in June 2015.

== Products and services ==
HDYR primarily offers made-to-order maki rolls. They offer different types of meats, fishes, vegetables, fruits, and fillings. Along with both white and brown rice, they also offer eight proprietary sauces and six toppings. In addition to rolls, HDYR also provides seaweed salad, cucumber salad, squid salad, edamame and miso soup. Some franchises carry tempura goods or local specialties, yet this practice is not universal. Their stated emphasis is on high-quality, fast and affordable food. To this end, HDYR uses proprietary maki machines to mix the rice, press the rice, and cut the rolls. Customer feedback, according to the company, is what led to the introduction of provisions such as brown rice and sake.

== Critical acclaim ==
As a result of its unique approach and layout, HDYR has been the recipient of a great deal of praise and award. Darren Tristano, restaurant analyst for Technomic Inc. in Chicago, called HDYR "the nexus of the two hottest trends among restaurant chains: Asian and fast-fresh casual, in which fresh ingredients are prepared quickly for people on the go." Matthew Mabel, president of Surrender, Inc., a Dallas, Texas-based management hospitality and consulting firm, noted that How Do You Roll? "could be revolutionary, not just for those in the sushi industry but all fast-casual chains.” It has also been called the "most unique sushi restaurant you will ever visit." A local news station reported that there is "nothing like it in the rest of the country."
