= Mao (restaurant chain) =

Asian-cuisine restaurant chain in Dublin, Ireland

- Type: Private
- Industry: Restaurant
- Genre: restaurant and takeaway chain
- Founded: 1992
- Founder: Graham Campbell
- Defunct: 2024
- Headquarters: Dublin, Ireland
- Number of locations: 9
- Area served: Dublin
- Owner: Colum and Ciarán Butler
- Website: mymao.ie

Mao (stylized MAO or Mao At Home) was an Irish-headquartered restaurant chain, serving Asian cuisine: Thai, Chinese, Japanese, Indonesian, Singaporean, Sichuan and Mongolian dishes are all offered.

== History ==
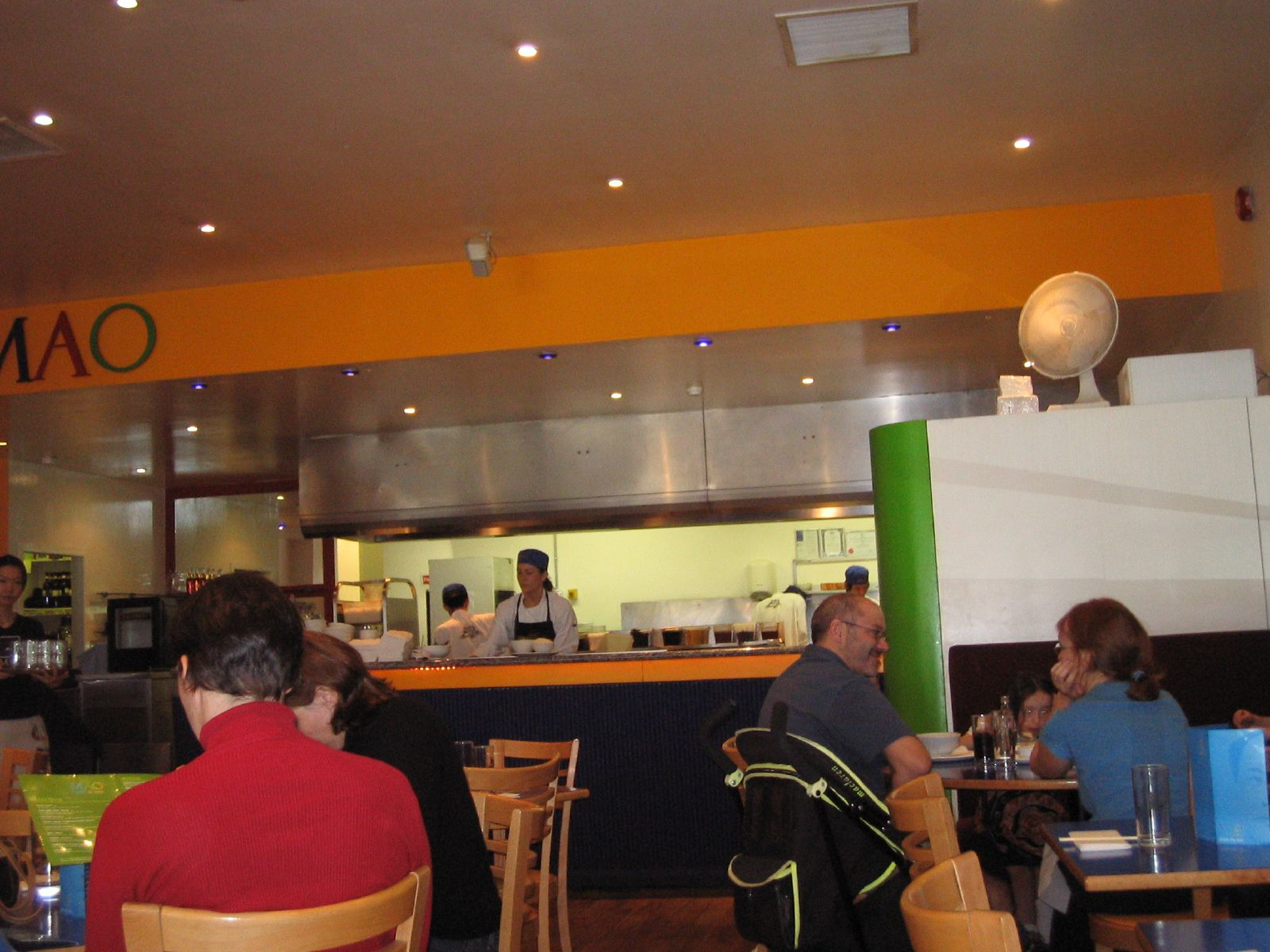
Interior of MAO Dún Laoghaire, 2004.

The first Mao restaurant opened on Chatham Row, Dublin in 1997. The name attracted some criticism, given Mao Zedong's role in the Great Leap Forward, Cultural Revolution, Great Chinese Famine and Sinicization of Tibet; during his time as leader of China, he was allegedly responsible for millions of deaths. This first restaurant was decorated with Andy Warhol's famous Mao silkscreen. In 2010 the chain went into receivership and was sold to Colm and Ciarán Butler. In 2024 the last remaining Mao restaurant closed after the lease expired with no buyer interested in the chain.
