= Ono Hawaiian BBQ =

Hawaii-themed restaurant chain

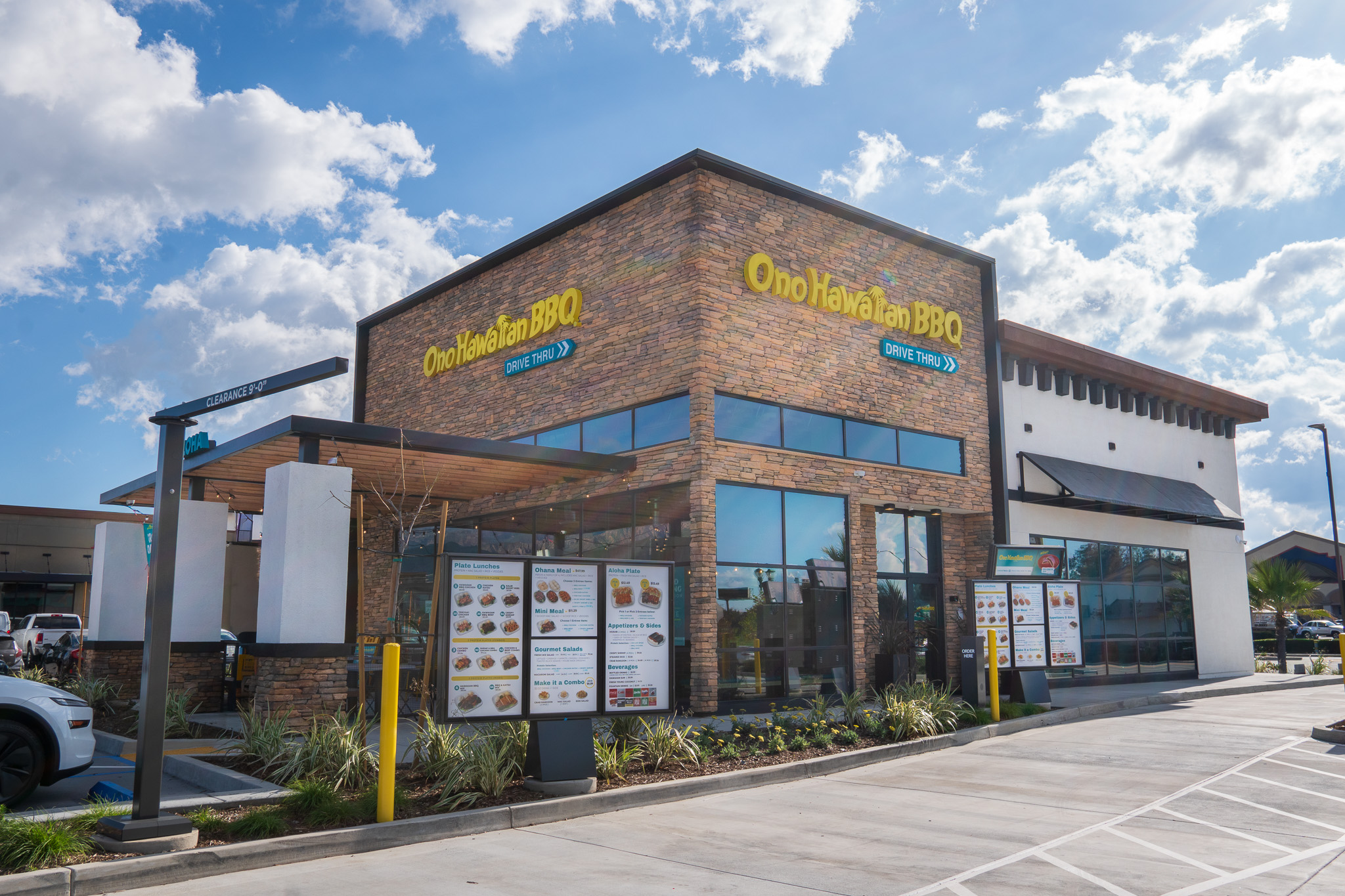
- Type: Private
- Industry: Restaurants
- Founded: October 2002; 23 years ago in Los Angeles, California, US
- Headquarters: Diamond Bar, California, United States
- Number of locations: 120 (November 2026)
- Areas served: California, Arizona
- Products: Hawaiian Plate Lunch
- Website: onohawaiianbbq.com

Ono Hawaiian BBQ is a fast-casual restaurant chain based in Southern California with 120 locations across California and Arizona. L&L Hawaiian Barbecue and Ono Hawaiian BBQ integrated the plate lunch and similar Hawaiian cuisines into the United States mainland fast casual food culture.

== History ==
Ono Hawaiian BBQ was established in October 2002 on Santa Monica Boulevard in Los Angeles, California. In July 2015, the company open its 50th location, and by 2017, the chain had more than 65 locations across California and Arizona. By 2025, the chain had over 100 locations, including seven in the Phoenix metropolitan area with plans to expand into Texas.

They partnered with Disney in 2025 to promote cultural celebration through food with theming around Moana and Lilo & Stitch. The brand also supported local first responders through appreciation events across California. The same year, Ono Hawaiian BBQ was ranked No. 179 on Restaurant Business's Top 500 Chains report by Technomic.
