= Roadhouse Grill =

American restaurant chain

- Company type: Restaurant
- Industry: Casual dining
- Founded: 1992; 34 years ago
- Founder: John Y. Brown, Jr.
- Defunct: May 2008; 18 years ago (United States)

Roadhouse Grill was an American chain of casual dining steakhouses in the eastern part of the United States founded in 1992. After filing for bankruptcy protection twice, in early 2002 and late 2007 respectively, all of the company's twenty remaining locations were closed the week of May 12, 2008, as the company was forced into liquidation.

In 2009, three former employees of the Tonawanda, New York location near Buffalo, New York, reopened the restaurant under the name Buffalo Roadhouse Grill, offering similar fare plus local specialties such as beef on weck and Buffalo wings. This location announced via their Facebook on December 30, 2020 that they were permanently closing.

Independently owned international venues of the chain following the same name and concept continue to operate in Italy, Bulgaria and Brazil.
