= The Training Table =

American fast food restaurant chain

- Company type: Private
- Industry: Fast food restaurant
- Founded: 1977
- Defunct: 2016
- Headquarters: Salt Lake City, Utah, United States
- Number of locations: 6
- Area served: Utah
- Key people: Kent Chard (President) Stephanie Chard (Vice President)
- Website: Official website
- Footnotes / references Slogan: "A Utah Original!"

The Training Table was a regional chain of fast food restaurants in Utah, United States. Founded in 1977, the chain focused on gourmet burgers. At its height, the chain had six locations in the Salt Lake City metropolitan area, one location in Ogden, one in Layton, and one in Provo.

== History ==
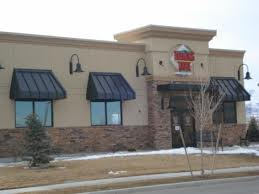
Restaurant in Riverton, May 2013

The Training Table Restaurants were founded in October 1977. The Training Table was family owned and operated by Kent and Stephanie Chard. It was known for its cheese fries and dipping sauce, along with several sandwich and hamburger preparations. It had locations in Layton, Sugar House, Cottonwood, West Valley, Provo, Ogden, South Towne, and Riverton. Until the early 2010s, it also had a location on the eastern edge of downtown Salt Lake City. In 2012 the business had a hard money lender and was near bankruptcy. In 2012 Stephanie Chard purchased 50% of The Training Table Restaurants, which was a family business. Stephanie Chard strategically navigated the company through this tumultuous time and became CEO in 2014. During 2015 Stephanie Chard became aware of misconduct between various individuals associated with The Training Table Restaurants. Stephanie Chard worked for one year to resolve the ongoing dispute, but was unable to come to a resolution with the various parties involved. In 2016 a lawsuit was filed on behalf of Training Table and Stephanie Chard which alleged securities fraud and legal malpractice claims associated with the corporation, among other allegations. In 2016, the Landlords, who were also part owners of Training Table and longtime advisors of Training Table, terminated The Training Table Restaurant's leases, and sold the properties to a third party, closing Training Table after 39 years. They announced that they had gone out of business on November 30, 2016, on their Facebook page.
