= Symposium Cafe =

Canadian restaurant franchise

Symposium Cafe Inc.
- Founders: Bill Argo; Terry Argo
- Area served: Ontario

Symposium Cafe Restaurant & Lounge is a restaurant chain in the Canadian province of Ontario, which serves as an all-day restaurant, café, and bar. The first restaurant was founded in 1996 in the City of London by Bill and Terry Argo. They began franchising in 2004, and had thirty locations as of the end of 2017. That year the company received the Franchisor of the Year (Traditional Franchises) from the Canadian Franchise Association Awards of Excellence. Services it provides include dine-in, take-out, and catering, focusing on continental and European food. The décor of locations also reflects the art and culture of the Mediterranean region.
