= Al Farooj Fresh =

Fast food chain headquartered in the United Arab Emirates

- Company type: Subsidiary
- Industry: Fast food
- Founded: 1994; 32 years ago
- Headquarters: United Arab Emirates
- Parent: Al Islami Foods

Al Farooj Fresh is an international chain of fast food restaurants based in the United Arab Emirates (UAE). Al Farooj Fresh was the first fast-casual restaurant chain in the UAE to offer foods such as shawarma sandwiches and chicken meals.

Al Farooj Fresh is a wholly owned subsidiary of Al Islami Foods, a company that provides halal food products, and has 19 branches worldwide, including 16 in the UAE, 2 in Oman and 1 in Lebanon.

== History ==
Al-Farooj Fresh was founded by a Lebanese family in 1994, with the first branch opening in Sharjah, United Arab Emirates, that year. By 2006, the chain had expanded to a total of eight branches.

On February 25, 2006, at the Gulfood Exhibition held at the Dubai International Convention & Exhibition Centre, it was announced that Al Farooj was acquired by the Mohammed Bin Rashid Establishment for Young Business Leaders, an organisation launched in 2002 to encourage and facilitate the development of business and entrepreneurial activity among UAE nationals. After Al Islami's final approval of the franchisee selection, the establishment worked jointly with Al Islami to introduce the concept to UAE entrepreneurs.

In February 2008, Al Islami acquired majority shares of the Al Farooj restaurant chain, relaunching the franchise later that month with plans to expand operations to serve the Middle Eastern market. Coinciding with the relaunch of Al Farooj Fresh, Al Islami announced plans to unveil their hospitality arm, of which Al Farooj Fresh was a major part of the portfolio, along with Al Islami Cart, Al Islami Meat Shops and several food products. The company's expansion continued into 2009, with Al Islami revealing that they would be expanding the Al Farooj chain to 17 branches with an investment of DHS 8 million (appx $2.2 million), providing them with 17 branches worldwide consisting of 14 in the UAE, 1 in Oman and 2 in Lebanon., and Kuwait.
