= Sandella's Flatbread Café =

International restaurant chain

- Company type: Private
- Industry: Restaurant
- Founded: Redding, Connecticut (1994; 32 years ago)
- Founder: Michael J. Stimola; President and CEO
- Headquarters: Redding, CT, United States
- Number of locations: Over 130 (as of October 2015)
- Key people: Michael Stimola
- Products: Sandwiches
- Website: sandellasusa.com

Sandella's Flatbread Café is an international fast casual restaurant chain founded in 1994 by Michael J. Stimola. The chain is known for its various proprietary flatbread dishes. It is based in Redding, Connecticut.

As of October 2015, the company had over 130 restaurants in the United States, India, Malta, Saudi Arabia, United Arab Emirates and Australia. Some of the company's locations are franchise operations. Sandella's Flatbread Café fare includes flatbread sandwiches, wraps, panini sandwiches, rice bowls, flatbread pizza, quesadillas, and salads.
