= Wildwood Kitchen =

British dining chain, who serves Italian food

Restaurant information
- Established: 2008
- Food type: Italian
- Website: wildwoodrestaurants.co.uk

Wildwood is a British casual dining business, serving an Italian menu, with 26 restaurants in the UK.

Wildwood restaurants are owned and operated by Bow Street Group plc, formerly Tasty Group.

The restaurants serve a full Italian menu.
