= Fryer's =

International fast food restaurant chain

Fryer’s
- Company type: Wholly owned subsidiary
- Industry: Fast Casual Restaurants
- Founded: 1989; 37 years ago
- Headquarters: Richmond, British Columbia, Canada
- Number of locations: 50+ (2009)
- Area served: Worldwide
- Products: American Food Choices
- Owner: Fryer’s International, Inc
- Website: fryersusa.com

Fryer's is an international fast-food chain focused on hamburgers, fried chicken, French fries, and milkshakes. Its headquarters is in the Richmond, British Columbia area, and is currently owned and operated by Fryer's International, Inc. Established in 1989, the Fryer's chain expanded to 46 locations scattered throughout North America between 1989 and 2002.

In early 2004, the chain began franchising. In one year, permits had been sold for over 100 franchised locations, catching the attention of the national restaurant industry. As of 2013, Fryer's has locations open throughout the United States, Canada and Middle East.

== Slogans ==
US – Canada

- 1989–1991: Can’t eat just one
- 1991–1993: Eat it your way!
- 1993–1995: Because it's awesome
- 1995–2001: Call it Quality
- 2001–Present: Quality You Can Trust

International

- 2007–Present: Eat so good for so little! (Bahamas)
- 2009–Present: It's Fryer’s time! (Costa Rica)
- 2010–Present: Leave the rest... taste the best! (Mexico)

== History ==
Fryer's was founded on April 20, 1989, in Toronto, Canada. The first restaurant was established as a 20-stool counter operation. Originally, the chain consisted of only dine-in facilities, but after the success and customer's demand, most locations have since added drive-through.

== In the media ==
In 2005, the company was featured in the TV series Alias.

== Locations ==
- United States
- (The Bahamas) Bahamas
- Brazil (opened February 2014)
- Canada
- Costa Rica
- Dominican Republic
- Mexico
- Pakistan (opened June 2013)
