= Camille's Sidewalk Cafe =

US-based restaurant franchise

- Company type: Private
- Industry: casual dining restaurant
- Genre: Restaurant
- Founded: 1996
- Founder: David and Camille Rutkauskas
- Number of locations: 2 (2026); 107 restaurants (2008); 29 restaurants in the USA (March 2013)
- Area served: Sioux Falls, South Dakota & Gallup, New Mexico

Camille's Sidewalk Cafe was a former American international restaurant franchise headquartered in Tulsa, Oklahoma, specializing in healthful, "fast casual" cuisine. In 2003 Camille's had more than 100 locations and in May 2013 had 36 locations in the United States, but as of April 2026 only two independent locations remained in operation, one in Sioux Falls, South Dakota and one in Gallup, New Mexico.

Camille's was previously ranked #37 in Entrepreneur magazine's top 50 new franchises.

Camille's Sidewalk Cafe was founded in 1996 by David Rutkauskas, his wife Camille and father Otto, with the first location (a 250-square-foot (23 m^{2}) kiosk) opening in the Woodland Hills Mall in Tulsa in October of that year. In January 2008, the company reached an agreement with Wal-Mart to include Camille's restaurants in new Wal-Mart supercenters, with as many as 200 such locations opening 2018. Stand-alone Camille's locations in Puerto Rico were scheduled to open in 2008, with 21 under development in Puerto Rico.. In 2008, the company launched 3 cafes in Bahrain and 2 in Dubai.

The Rutkauskas' company, Beautiful Brands, also owns other franchise concepts including FreshBerry, a frozen yogurt chain.

According to a May 14, 2013 article in the Tulsa World, the chain peaked at 107 restaurants in 2009. In the years that followed, two-thirds of the chain's locations have been closed, leaving 36 locations in the United States, and the chain has faced vocal criticisms from some franchisees as well as a lawsuit over the Middle Eastern franchise rights. The original company-owned store in Woodland Hills Mall closed at the end of 2012.
