= Hen House Restaurants =

Defunct restaurant

Hen House Interstate, Inc.
- Type: Private
- Industry: Restaurant
- Headquarters: United States

Hen House Interstate, Inc. was a Chesterfield, Missouri-based company that owned and operated a chain of restaurants that at one time had up to 40 locations on the American Interstate highway system throughout Illinois, Indiana, Kentucky, Missouri and Kansas. The chain was known for its open menu concept, which allowed patrons to order any kind of food at any time of the day, such as eggs and pancakes at dinnertime and hamburgers and fried chicken in the morning; they are also known for the distinctive design of its buildings, the exteriors of which resembled hay barns.

In 1981, the Decatur Herald and Review reported the company was expected to expand from 26 locations to 40 and that company-wide sales had increased between 13 and 14 percent that year. The company's business operations involved hiring restaurant managers from the community in which each restaurant was opened and emphasized friendly service and engagement with the local community. The company also followed an awards system in which top managers, employees and restaurants received awards for excellence in areas such as best quality control and largest individual restaurant increase in sales. Awards given to recipients included company-paid vacations in luxury hotels.

In 1982, the company reported intentions to build large truck stop locations, with fuel and related services.

In 1991, during a major recession, Hen House Interstate, Inc. filed for Chapter 11 bankruptcy. During proceedings, the company was lent an additional $300,000 by their primary lender to fund continuing operations and to pay down debt. The company further obtained workers compensation insurance from Hartford Underwriters, but failed to make payments on the policy despite the insurer continuing to cover them. The reorganization failed and in 1993, the bankruptcy court converted the Chapter 11 filing to a Chapter 7 liquidation. At this time Hartford was owed over $50,000 in unpaid premiums and upon finally learning of the bankruptcy proceedings, attempted to collect the premiums from the company's lender via the bankruptcy court as administrative fees. The court ruled in favor of Hartford, however appeals eventually reached the United States Supreme Court, who in 1999, upheld a prior appeal decision in favor of the lender, with the court's opinion read by Antonin Scalia. This decision would go on to influence debtor-in-possession caselaw.

Though the parent company was liquidated, individual privately owned Hen House locations still exist; these are primarily located in Illinois and Missouri.

One Hen House location remains in Illinois, in Arcola.
