= Jimmy's Restaurants =

British restaurant chain

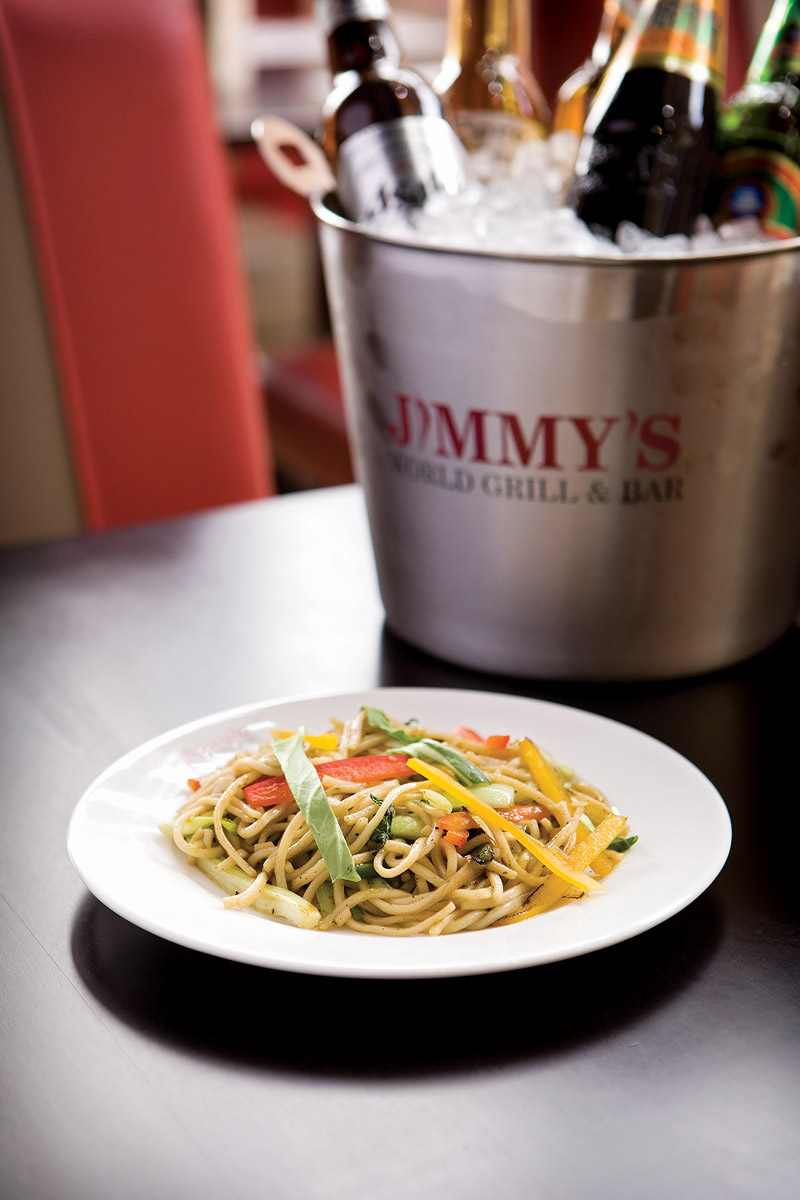
A dish served at a branch of the restaurant chain

Jimmy's Restaurants is a loosely linked chain of buffet restaurants in the United Kingdom, with other companies trading under a similar format as Jimmy's World Grill & Bar, Jimmy's World Kitchen, Jimmy Spices, Jimmy's World and Jimmy's Bar.

The first Jimmy's World Grill & Bar opened in 2003 and as of 2016 the chain operated restaurants at about 11 locations. In 2012 it launched its flagship restaurant in The O2, London.

Each restaurant offers cuisines from multiple countries including Italy, China, India, Mexico, the US and the United Kingdom. The restaurants all offer "live cooking stations" where food is cooked to order in front of the customer.

== History ==
Prior to Jimmy's Restaurants, the business started with a number of restaurants called Jimmy Spices. The first Jimmy Spices opened in October 2003 in the Old Glassworks in Birmingham in the Regency Wharf scheme just off Broad Street. The concept was developed by Nitin Bhatnagar and focused on all-you-can-eat Indian, Italian, Thai and Chinese cuisine in a themed open plan kitchen. This was the first multi-cuisine buffet restaurant of its kind in the UK. As the company grew, it opened restaurants in Solihull, Sutton Coldfield, and Stratford Upon Avon; and brought in Jaswinder Choongh as a partner.

The first Jimmy Spices to open within the M25 was in Epsom in October 2007 and Staines in October 2008.

In 2011, the company went into liquidation, leaving the Midlands-based branches of Jimmy Spices with Jaswinder Choongh to allow the founders to focus on Jimmy's World Grill.

The chain is legally structured so individual branches can fail as has happened in 2016 and 2018, while the chain continues to operate.
