= La Bou =

Cafe chain in California

- Company type: Franchise
- Industry: Restaurants
- Founded: 1981; 45 years ago
- Headquarters: Sacramento, California, U.S.
- Key people: Trong Nguyen (owner)
- Products: Quick casual/Bakery-café, including varieties of bread, such as bagels and muffins, cold sandwiches, hot panini, salads, and soups

La Bou is a chain of bakery-café cafe restaurants in the Sacramento area which sells sandwiches, soups, salads, breads and bakery items. It also has locations in Auburn, Roseville, Folsom, and Elk Grove. Offering sit in and take out services.

== Corporate history ==
In 1982, the first La Bou store opened its doors offering owner Trong Nguyen's handmade croissants.

La Bou has expanded to 26 company-owned stores and franchised units all serving croissants and espresso drinks, in addition to pastries, soups, salads and sandwiches. In Sacramento, La Bou has a presence in the following areas:

•South Land Park
•Fruitridge Road
•Madison
•Poseys
•Howe
•West Sacramento
•9th Street
•11th Street

Other locations in California where La Bou has a presence include Folsom, Elk Grove, Roseville, Rocklin, Granite Bay and Carmichael.

La Bou also has a digital online presence. In 1999, they started a Corporate Catering initiative under the name "La Bou Delivers" for the local business community.

New franchises are no longer available. In early 2023 the company was down to 13 locations as per the company website.
