= Ribs & Burgers =

Australian restaurant chain

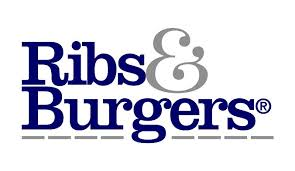
- Type: Private
- Industry: Restaurant
- Founded: 2011
- Headquarters: Australia
- Number of locations: 26 (as of March 2025)
- Products: fast food, soft drinks, hamburgers, chips
- Owner: Bradley Michael
- Website: ribsandburgers.com/au/

Ribs & Burgers is an Australian gourmet fast food restaurant chain founded in 2011 by Bradley Michael and Savannah Michael. The menu includes a range of classic-style burgers and other food items. which also owns other restaurants around Australia.

As of 2018, Ribs & Burgers has 17 restaurants around Australia - nine in New South Wales, four in Victoria, three in Queensland and one in Western Australia. They also have a restaurant in Teddington, UK, and 9 in South Africa.

In 2016, in response to a craze of ‘unusual’ burgers, Ribs & Burgers launched a ‘Mutant Burger’ - an electric blue-coloured burger.
