= Café Yumm! =

Restaurant chain

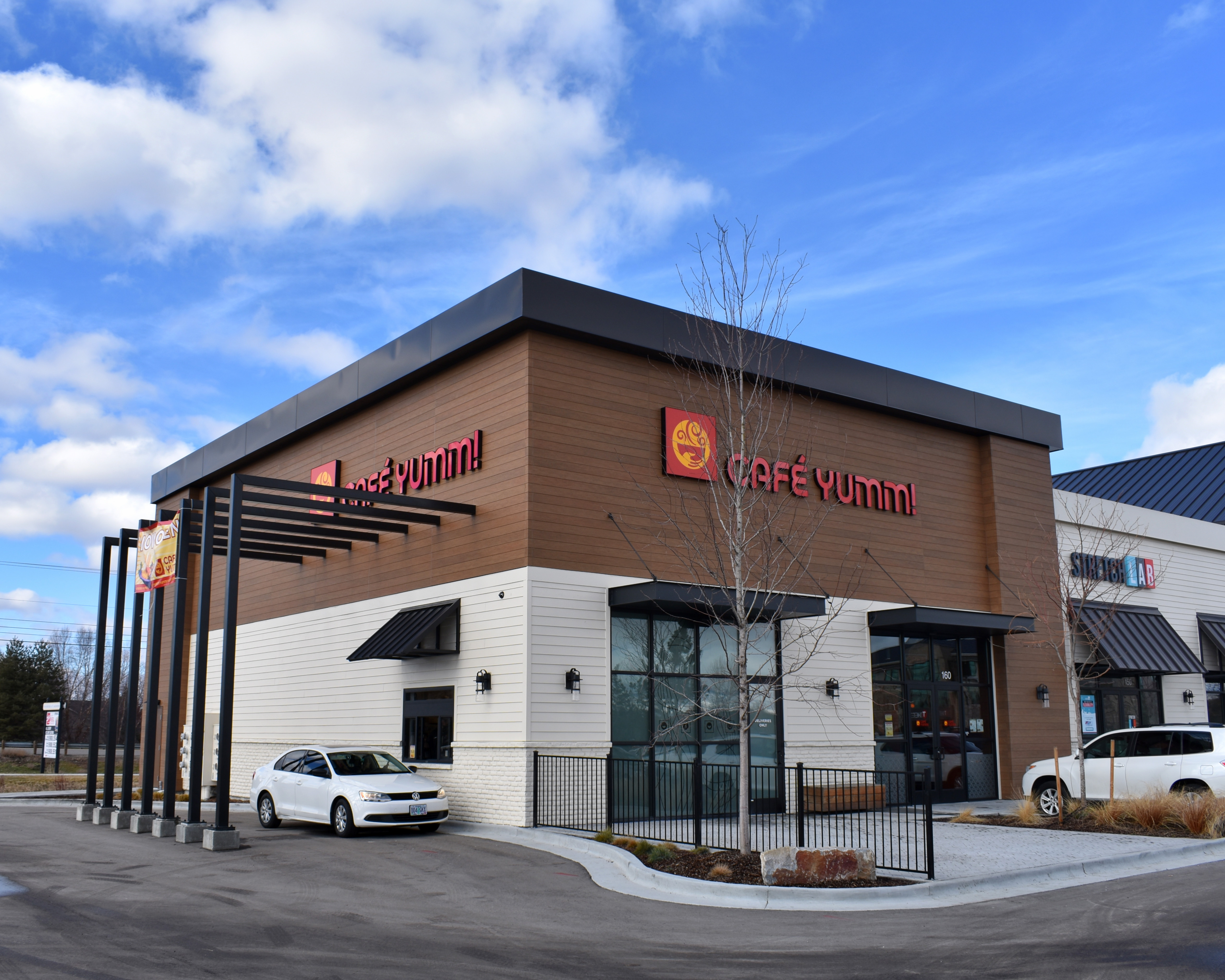
- Café Yumm! in Eagle, Idaho
- Company type: Private
- Industry: Fast casual restaurant
- Founded: 1997
- Founders: Mary Ann and Mark Beauchamp
- Headquarters: Eugene, Oregon, USA
- Area served: Oregon, Washington, Idaho
- Number of employees: 54
- Website: www.cafeyumm.com

Café Yumm! is a fast casual restaurant chain with outlets in the Pacific Northwest of the United States.

Founded in Eugene, Oregon, Café Yumm! outlets focus on fast, casual, cheap, and healthy cuisine, and some menu items feature the company's original signature sauce.

== History ==
Café Yumm! was founded in 1997 when owners Mary Ann and Mark Beauchamp converted their unsuccessful juice bar into a fast casual restaurant. Central to the new menu were the Yumm! Bowl and its Yumm! Sauce, both developed earlier by Mary Ann Beauchamp at her former restaurant, Wild Rose Café & Deli. The company opened a second location in Eugene in 1999 and a third in 2002, and in 2007 the company began to franchise. The chain grew to 15 locations by 2015, with two franchises in Bend, Oregon.

The chain opened its 23rd location in Eagle, Idaho, in February, 2019, as part of a three-outlet plan that includes two future Boise locations.

Estimated annual revenue for the company is $10.1 million with an estimate of 54 employees.

== Menu ==
The Café Yumm! menu consists of five categories: three sizes of rice bowls layered with organic beans, Yumm! Sauce, and Deluxe Toppings (shredded cheddar cheese, tomatoes, avocado, sour cream, black olives, and cilantro), sandwiches and wraps, salads, soups, and bentos. More than 50 percent of the food served at Café Yumm! restaurants is certified organic.

=== Yumm! Sauce ===
Café Yumm! co-founder Mary Ann Beauchamp developed the recipe for Yumm! Sauce in the 1980s. The company's original signature sauce is made with a base of almonds, garbanzo beans, soy beans, lemon juice, oil, herbs, and nutritional yeast. The sauce is used on a variety of menu items at Café Yumm! restaurants and a commercial version of the sauce is sold in over 160 grocery stores throughout the Pacific Northwest and through the company's online store.

== Reception and awards ==
Café Yumm! has been named The Register-Guard's Readers’ Choice for "Best Lunch Bargain" and "Favorite Vegetarian" in readers' polls many times since 2009. The company was also recognized as "Most Environmentally Friendly Business" in 2009. Café Yumm! has been named in the Eugene Weekly's "Best Of" for a variety of awards including "Best Vegetarian", "Best Eats Under $8", and "Best Cheap Eats" from 2014 to 2018.

QSR Magazine included Café Yumm! in the 2018 40/40 List of America's Hottest Startup Fast Casuals.
