= Your Pie =

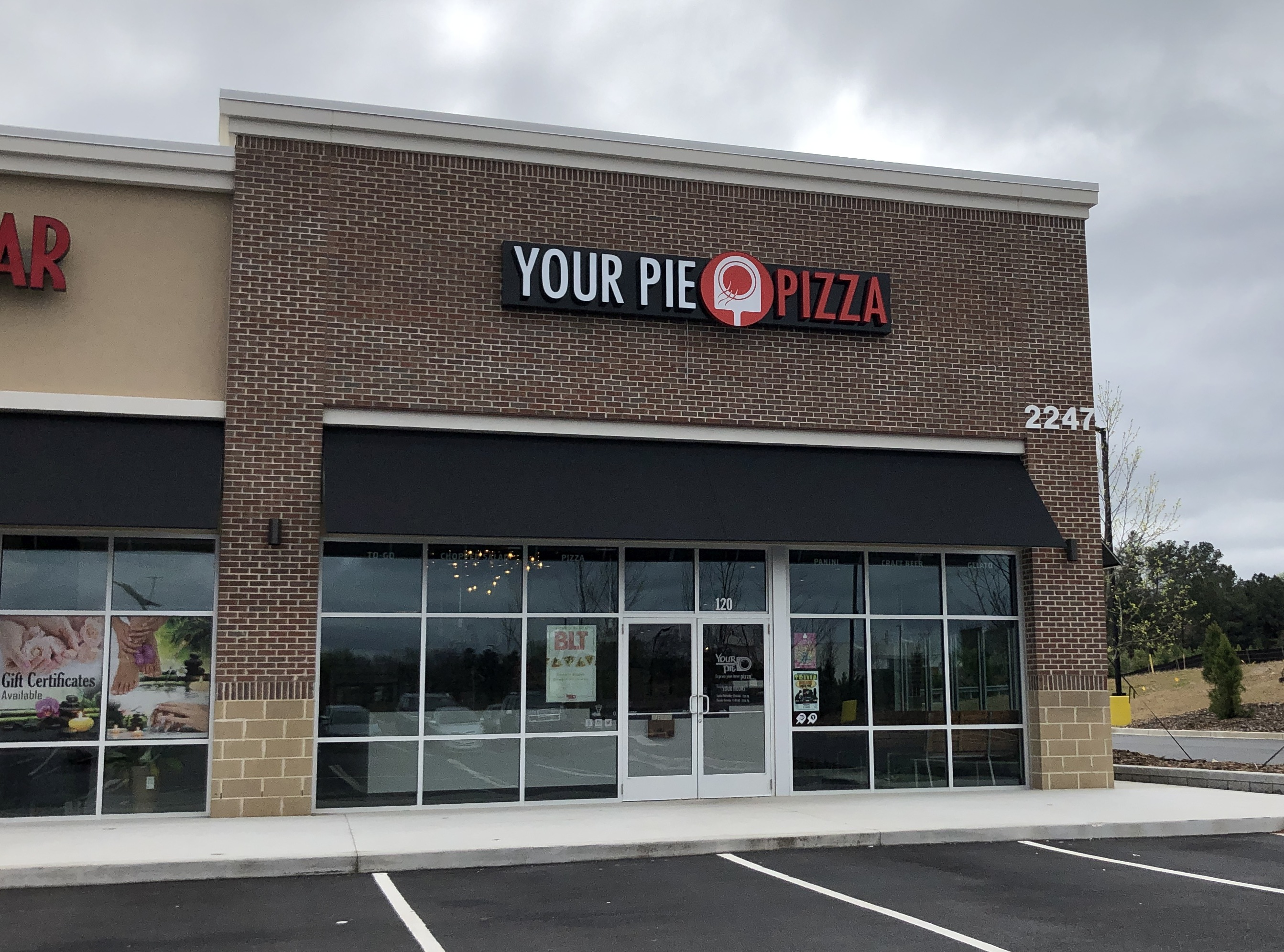
- A Your Pie in Canton, Georgia

Restaurant information
- Established: 2008; 17 years ago
- Food type: Pizza
- Location: United States
- Website: yourpie.com

Your Pie is an American fast-casual pizza concept, that was started in Athens, Georgia in 2008 by Drew French, and operates as a restaurant franchise with 70 locations across 19 states. Your Pie has customizable 10-inch pizzas, pasta bowls, and salads. The restaurant uses brick ovens to cook their pizzas. Gelato (Italian ice cream), craft beer and wine are also available.

== History ==
Founder Drew French worked in the kitchens of many franchise brands throughout his college career. In May 2006, French vacationed with his wife to the island of Ischia for their honeymoon, an Italian island off the coast of Naples, where his wife's family is from. It was here where the concept for Your Pie began. Brick oven pizza was everywhere in Ischia. Noticing how quickly custom, artisan pies could be made through using a brick oven, French's idea for a build-it-yourself, quick-serve pizza place came to be.

== Customization ==
Customers select which hand-tossed dough, homemade sauce, and all-natural cheese will be used for their customized pizza. The restaurant provides 35 ingredients to top pizzas with before the pizza is cooked.

== Awards and accolades ==
In March 2013, Entrepreneur Magazine listed Your Pie as #66 in a list of Top New Franchises. In June 2013, 1851 Magazine also selected Your Pie as one of 64 Restaurants To Watch for the year. In October 2015, Your Pie's Peach Prosciutto craft series pizza was selected as the East Coast Pizza Championship winner.
