= The Brothers Three =

Pizza restaurant in Marinette, Wisconsin

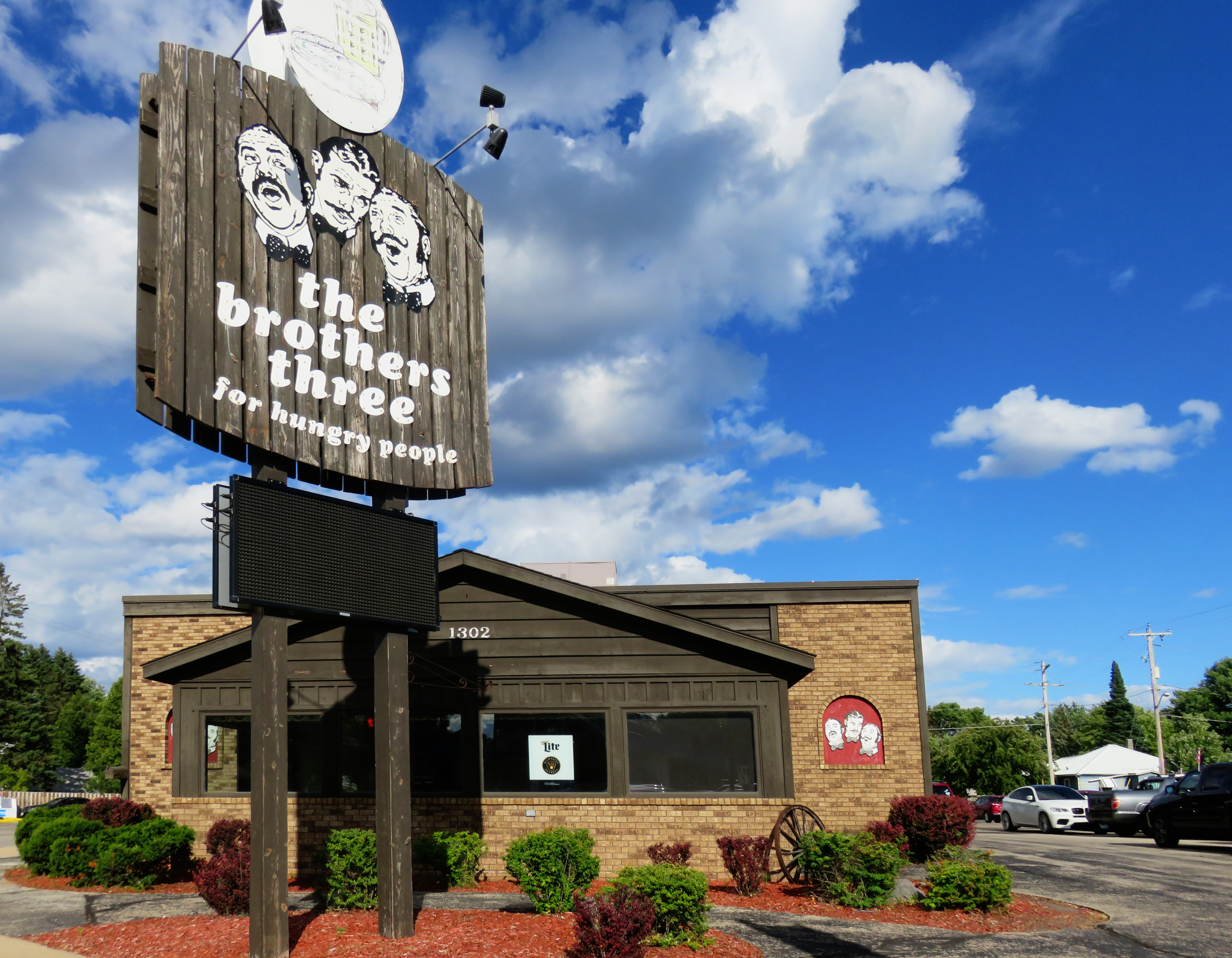
- The Brothers Three in Marinette, Wisconsin
- Type: Private
- Industry: Food
- Founded: May 19, 1972; 54 years ago in Marinette, Wisconsin
- Founders: Glen, Keith, and Dale Nergaard
- Headquarters: Marinette, Wisconsin, United States
- Number of locations: 1 (2019)
- Area served: Marinette, Wisconsin
- Products: Pizza
- Owner: Jacog, Inc
- Website: www.thebrothersthree.com

The Brothers Three (stylized as the brothers three) is a pizza restaurant in Marinette, Wisconsin and former pizza chain. It was founded in Cicero, Illinois in 1968 by the brothers Glen, Keith, and Dale Nergaard. In 1972 they opened the Marinette location. Over the next several decades, they expanded the chain to other locations across Wisconsin. Currently only one location remains, in Marinette. There is another The Brothers Three in Oconto, Wisconsin, which was formerly part of the chain, but is now independently run.

== History ==
The roots of the business were established in Cicero, Illinois by three brothers: Glen, Keith, and Dale Nergaard. The Cicero business was in operation from 1968 to 1972. The original Wisconsin location of the restaurant, in Marinette, opened on May 19, 1972. The Marinette business was sold to Badger Bay Holding Corporation in November 2004, when its agent, Keith Dau, purchased the company from the brothers. It was sold again in May 2018; its new owners are Jim and April Hansen.

== Locations ==
In addition to the original restaurant, located at 1302 Marinette Avenue in Marinette, branches of the restaurant were also established in Chippewa Falls, Green Bay, Eau Claire, Neenah, and Oconto. Another restaurant was later opened in Appleton.

The Chippewa Falls location was opened by Glen Nergaard in 1973 at 1 East Spring Street. After Glen moved to Florida, it continued operating under his brother Keith. The restaurant was sold in 1980 and renamed Italian Village.

The Green Bay branch was located on the outskirts of the town, at 1926 South Ridge Road in Ashwaubenon. It closed in 1984.

The Eau Claire location was also opened by Glen Nergaard and later taken over by Keith. It was located at 1720 Harding Avenue. As manager of the Eau Claire branch, Keith was named Outstanding Restaurateur of the Year in 1990 for the local chapter of the Wisconsin Restaurant Association.

The Neenah branch was located at 220 South Commercial Street. It closed in 1984.

The Oconto location of the restaurant was opened on March 19, 1980, by Judy Daul in the former Holt Balcom Lumber Co. building at 106 Superior Avenue. It was later run by Ron and Anita Pecha. That location was taken over by Jack and Jamie Karban in 2017.

Keith Dau opened a branch of the restaurant at 3414 West College Avenue in Grand Chute, on the outskirts of Appleton, in 2010. It operated until 2014, when it disassociated from The Brothers Three and renamed itself 'zza Odyssey Pizzeria and Pub; the restaurant has since ceased operation.
