= Così (restaurant) =

American fast-casual restaurant chain

- Type: Private
- Industry: Fast casual restaurant Franchising
- Founded: 1996; 30 years ago, in New York City, United States
- Founder: Drew Harre
- Headquarters: Mountainside, New Jersey, United States
- Area served: Northeastern United States
- Website: www.getcosi.com

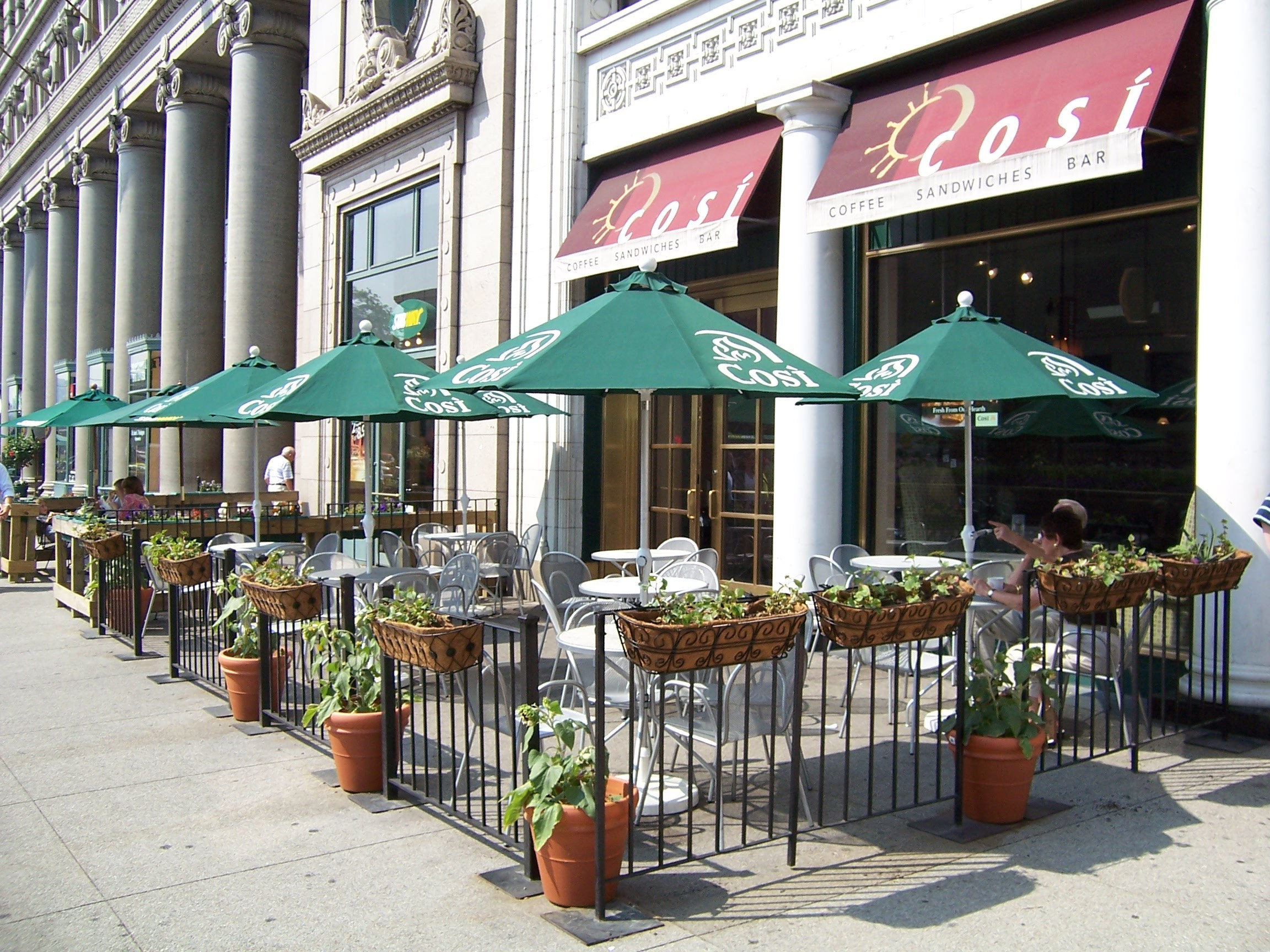
Former Così restaurant on South Michigan Ave, Chicago, Illinois

Così, based in Mountainside, New Jersey, is an American fast-casual restaurant chain that specializes in flatbread sandwiches. The company name comes from the opera Così fan tutte, which was a favorite of the original owner.

There are 14 Cosi restaurant locations, primarily in the Northeastern United States.

== History ==
The first Così restaurant was opened in 1989 by Drew Harre in Paris] In 1996, Shep and Jay Wainwright opened the first Così in the United States, in New York City.

In October 1999, Così merged with Xando (formerly ZuZu).

The company became a public company via an initial public offering in 2002. In July 2003, Kevin Armstrong was named CEO of the company.

In June 2010, Così sold its 13 stores in Washington, D.C. to Capitol C Restaurants, owner of Qdoba Mexican Grill, as franchises, for $8.4 million. In December 2011, Carin Stutz was named CEO of the company. In June 2013, she resigned.

In March 2014, Così's largest franchisee, RJ Dourney, was named CEO and the company announced it was moving its corporate headquarters from Deerfield, Illinois to Boston, Massachusetts.

In January 2015, RJ Dourney merged his 14 franchised Cosi restaurants into the company in exchange for shares of the company.

In August 2016, CEO RJ Dourney was fired and Patrick Bennett became interim CEO.

In September 2016, the company filed for bankruptcy protection under Chapter 11, Title 11, United States Code and closed stores. As a result of the bankruptcy filing, the company's shares were de-listed from the NASDAQ.

In May 2017, the company emerged from bankruptcy under the ownership of MILFAM II L.P., AB Value Partners, LP, AB Value Management LLC and AB Opportunity Fund LLC.

In February 2020, Così once again filed for Chapter 11 bankruptcy and closed several locations.

However, the company withdrew its filing to make it eligible for aid under the CARES Act, passed in March 2020.

In July 2022, Cosi sought to reopen its bankruptcy.
