= Eatza Pizza =

American restaurant chain

- Company type: Private
- Industry: Restaurant
- Founded: 1997
- Defunct: 2008
- Headquarters: Scottsdale, Arizona (until 2007); Westport, Connecticut (2007-2008)
- Number of locations: 100+ (until 2007); 10 (2007); 5 (2008)
- Products: Pizza

Eatza Pizza was a buffet-style restaurant chain founded in Arizona in 1997. In 2007, it was one of the largest all-buffet pizza chains in the United States, with 112 locations in 14 states and Puerto Rico.

== History ==
In March 2007, Eatza Pizza was bought by International Franchise Associates. Following the purchase, the corporate headquarters was moved from Arizona to Westport, Connecticut. In July 2008, International Franchise Associates filed for Chapter 7 bankruptcy. At that time, only five Eatza Pizza locations were left.

== Fare ==
Their menu included at least 18 varieties of pizza, along with various other foods. When it was based in Scottsdale, the chain had 112 restaurants open or under development in Arizona, Alabama, California, Utah, Oregon, Washington, Idaho, Florida, Mississippi, North Carolina, Tennessee, Ohio and New Mexico, and Puerto Rico.
