= Daphne's Greek Cafe =

Restaurant chain in California, US

Daphne's
- Type: Private
- Industry: Food And Beverage
- Genre: Restaurants
- Founded: 1991; 35 years ago
- Founder: George Katakalidis
- Headquarters: 6 (as of April 2024), Los Angeles, California, USA
- Area served: California
- Products: Gyros and Kabobs
- Services: Sit down and take-away fare
- Website: http://daphnes.biz

Daphne's Greek Cafe or, Daphne's California Greek, is an American fast-casual Greek restaurant operating in California. The restaurant name refers to Daphne of Greek mythology whom the god Apollo desired.

Daphne's was rated #11 in 2006 Top 100 Movers and Shakers in the Fast Casual magazine.

Named after the Greek symbol for excellence, Daphne’s Greek Café is a trendsetter in fast casual. The 70-unit chain recently implemented an English-speaking course for its employees. Throw in the best chain gyros and you’ve got one heckuva restaurant.

— Fast Casual Magazine, January 2007

Daphne's was voted Best Greek in the June 2008 issue of San Diego Magazine.

== History ==
Daphne's Greek Cafe was founded by George Katakalidis in 1991. The chain entered bankruptcy in January 2010. It had 60 locations throughout Arizona and California and was purchased out of bankruptcy by an investor group headed by William Trefethen. In 2011, Daphne's name changed to Daphne's California Greek with a new concept that has been characterized as: a “hybrid” of California-meets-Greek cuisine, with an emphasis on freshness.

Daphne's California Greek continued their re-branding effort under William Trefethen group for about four years before suddenly selling the company to a Chicago investment group named Victory Park Capital.

In early 2024, all remaining locations in Orange County and San Diego County closed. As of April 2024, only six locations remain; five locations are in Southern California and one is in the Sacramento area. They are Simi Valley, Thousand Oaks, Redondo Beach, Temecula, Ontario, and Roseville.

== See also ==
- List of Greek restaurants
