= Champps =

American restaurant chain

Champps Americana
- Type: Corporation
- Industry: Restaurants
- Genre: Casual dining, sports bar
- Founded: Saint Paul, Minnesota (1984)
- Founder: Dean Vlahos
- Headquarters: Dallas, Texas, U.S.
- Number of locations: 2
- Products: American cuisine
- Parent: Fox & Hound Restaurant Group Inc.
- Website: Champps.com

Champps Americana (commonly known as Champps) is a casual dining restaurant chain and sports bar. There are 2 locations across the United States.

== History ==
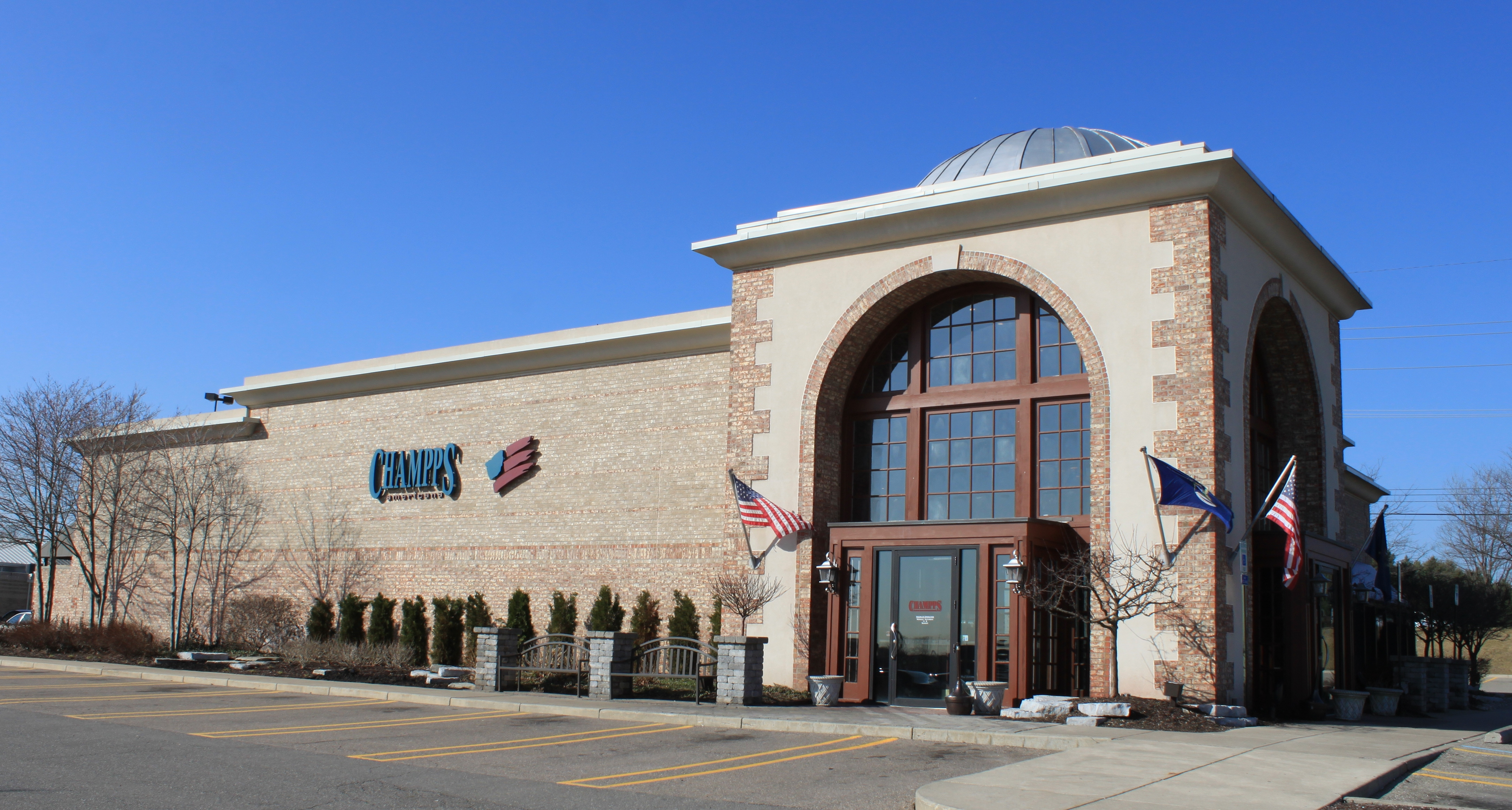
Champps in Livonia, Michigan in 2012 (now closed).

Champps began in 1984 as a small restaurant in Saint Paul, Minnesota and was called Concourse 7. The name of the restaurant was soon changed to "Champps" and they transformed into a sports bar, selling beer, burgers and sandwiches. The business added big screen televisions to their restaurants, for patrons to watch the latest sports games, while eating their meal.

Champps is owned by Champps Entertainment, Inc., an affiliate of Fox & Hound Restaurant Group. Fox & Hound's parent company bought Champps Entertainment in 2007.

On December 15, 2013, the restaurant chain filed for bankruptcy, and again on August 10, 2016. As of June 2026, there are 2 locations still in operation, in Eden Prairie, Minnesota and Brookfield, Wisconsin.
