= Brinker =

Brinker is a surname of Dutch and German origin. Notable people with the surname include:

- Anja Brinker (born 1991), German artistic gymnast
- Bill Brinker (1883–1965), baseball player
- Bob Brinker, radio host
- Chris Brinker (1970–2013), American film producer and director
- Christine Brinker (born 1981), German skeet shooter
- Howard Brinker (died 2004), American football coach
- Kristin Brinker (born 1972), German politician
- Maren Brinker (born 1986), German volleyball player
- Nancy Brinker (born 1946), founder and CEO of Susan G. Komen for the Cure
- Norman E. Brinker (1931–2009), restaurateur
- Ruth Brinker (1922–2011), American AIDS activist
- Scott Brinker (born 1971), computer programmer and entrepreneur
- Victory Brinker (born 2012), American child opera singer and actress

== See also ==
- Beebo Brinker (novel), lesbian pulp fiction novel written in 1962 by Ann Bannon
- Brinker International (NYSE: EAT), the parent company of Chili's and Maggiano's Little Italy
- Hans Brinker, or The Silver Skates, novel by American author Mary Mapes Dodge, first published in 1865
- Komen Brinker Award for Scientific Distinction, for work in the fields of breast cancer research, screening or treatment
- USS Henry Brinker (1861), small steamship acquired by the Union Navy during the American Civil War
