= Kelli Valade =

American businesswoman

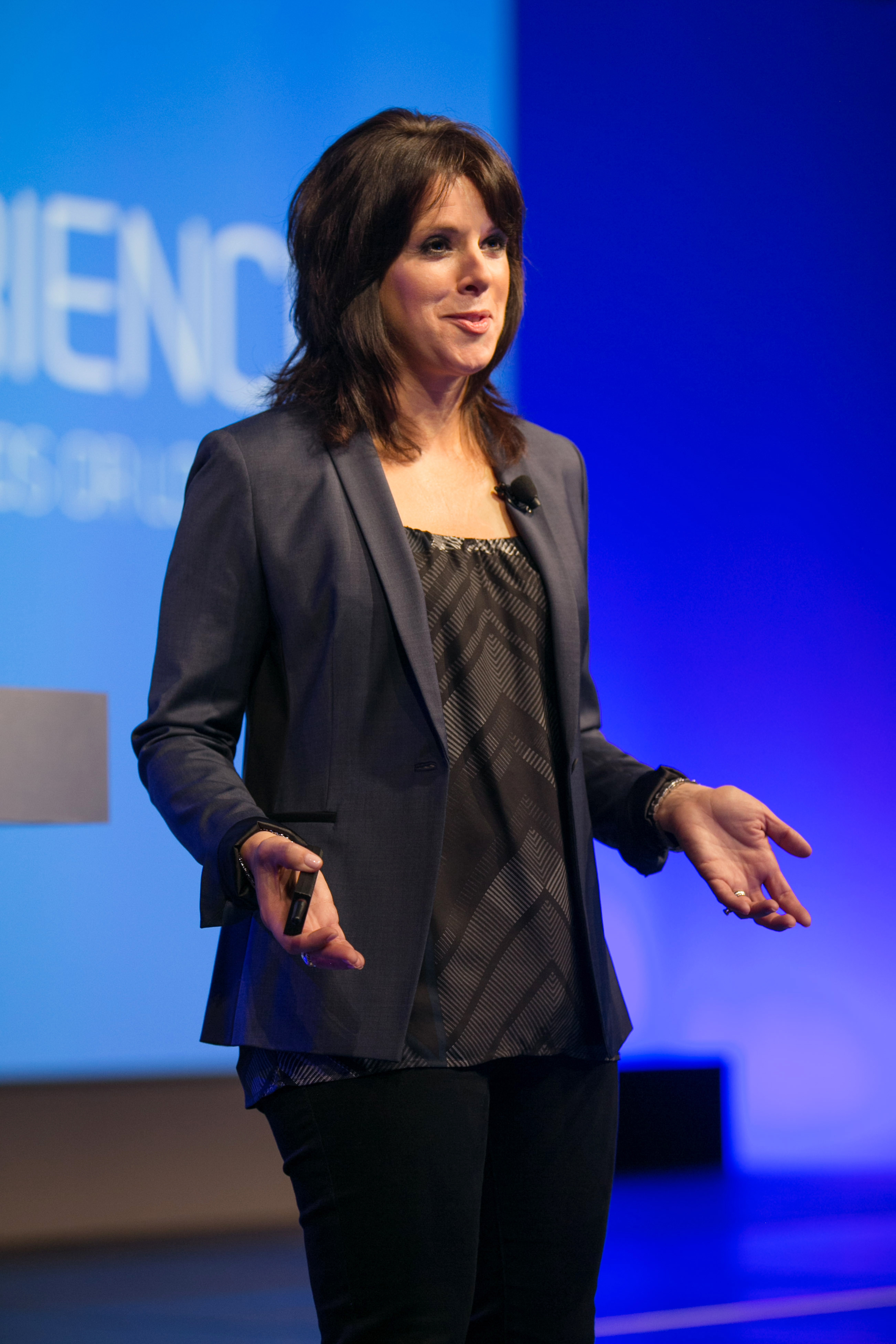
- Born: October 11, 1969 (age 57); Syracuse, New York
- Education: Binghamton University (B.A.); Syracuse University (MBA)
- Occupation: Chief executive officer at Women's Foodservice Forum
- Partner: Don Valade

Kelli Valade (born October 11, 1969) is an American businesswoman who was formerly the chief executive officer of Red Lobster, Denny's, and Black Box Intelligence (formerly TDn2K). She is also the former brand president of Chili's Grill & Bar and former executive vice president at Brinker International.

From June 2022 to February 2026, Valade was the CEO of Denny's. In January 2026 she was named as the CEO of Women's Foodservice Forum.

== Early life and education ==
Valade was born on October 11, 1969, in Syracuse, New York. She was adopted at birth, raised in an Italian family, and spent her Sundays cooking meatballs and sauce with her grandmother. She grew up playing softball and basketball in New York state and had her first job as a hostess at TJ's Big Boy when she was 16 years old. From there, her love for the restaurant industry was born.

Valade received her Bachelor of Science in sociology from Binghamton University, where she ran an Italian restaurant while studying. She received her MBA from Syracuse University.

== Early career ==
Valade started her career in restaurants and hospitality in 1993 when she worked as an intern at American Services Management Resources, now known as TDn2K. From there, she moved to Carlson Restaurants Worldwide where she was a manager of training and recruiting for Friday's Front Row Italiano, part of TGI Fridays. In 1996, she joined Brinker International as the director of On the Border Mexican Grill & Cantina.

== Tenure at Brinker ==
In November 1996, Valade was hired to Brinker International as the director for On the Border Mexican Grill & Cantina. From there, she held a number of senior and executive positions that included:

1997 - 2000: director, human resources, Brinker International
2000 - 2002: senior director, corporate human resources and diversity & inclusion, Brinker International
2002 - 2003: vice president, human resources
2003 - 2004: vice president, emerging brands
2004 - 2005: vice president, compensation & compliance
2005 - 2007: vice president, people & performance
2007 - 2009: senior vice president, PeopleWorks, Chili's Grill & Bar
2010 - 2016: chief operating officer, Chili's Grill & Bar
2016 - 2018: president, Chili's Grill & Bar and executive vice president, Brinker International

During her time as Chili's COO, Valade implemented the "Best Life" wellbeing platform with programs tied to improving team members’ career, social, financial, community and physical wellbeing, achieving all-time high team engagement scores.

== Non-profit ==
Valade is on the board of directors of the Women's Foodservice Forum, an organization that is accelerating the advancement of women leaders. In January 2026, Valade was named CEO of the Women's Foodservice Forum, succeeding Therese Gearhart. Additionally, she is on the board of Shelton School, an organization focused on improving the education of individuals with learning differences.

== Awards and memberships ==
- Board of directors: Women's Foodservice Forum
- On the Top 50 Power List presented by Nation's Restaurant News
- Board member: National Restaurant Association, 2013 - 2015
- Previous board member for the Multicultural Foodservice and Hospitality Alliance
- Won the Beacon Award from The Western Foodservice and Hospitality Expo
- Won the 2012 Women in Business Award presented by the Dallas Business Journal
- Was named a Women Worth Watching by the Diversity Journal in 2010

== Personal life ==
Valade has been married to her husband, Don Valade, since 1998.
