= Nancy Brinker =

Non-profit executive and political appointee

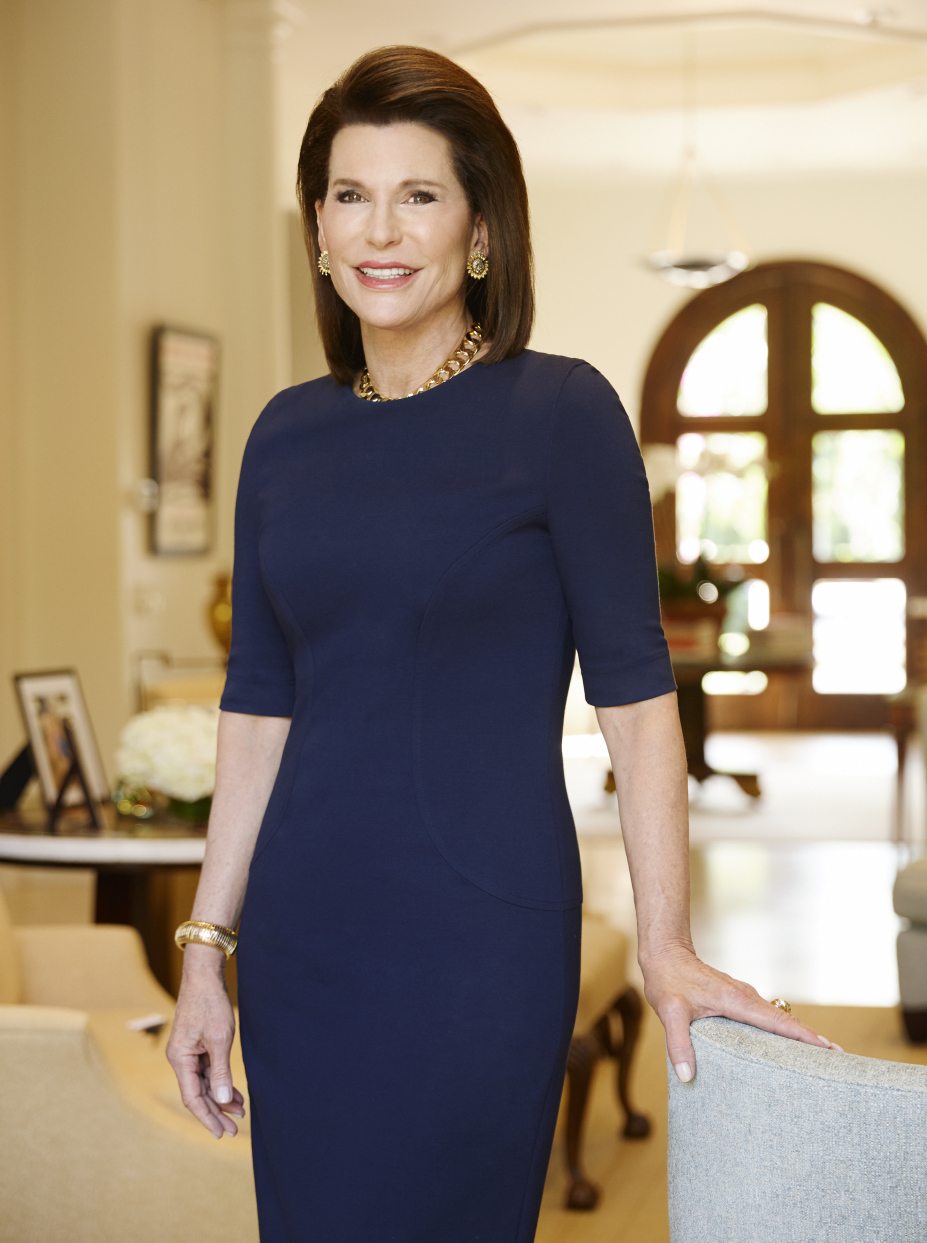
- Brinker in 2017

WHO Goodwill Ambassador for Cancer Control
- In office May 26, 2009 – May 30, 2018
- Appointed by: Margaret Chan

29th Chief of Protocol of the United States
- In office September 14, 2007 – January 20, 2009
- President: George W. Bush
- Preceded by: Donald Ensenat
- Succeeded by: Capricia Marshall

23rd United States Ambassador to Hungary
- In office September 26, 2001 – June 19, 2003
- President: George W. Bush
- Preceded by: Peter Tufo
- Succeeded by: George Herbert Walker III

Personal details
- Born: Nancy Goodman; December 6, 1946 (age 79) Peoria, Illinois, U.S.
- Party: Republican
- Spouse: Norman E. Brinker
- Education: University of Illinois at Urbana–Champaign (BA)

Nancy Goodman Brinker (born December 6, 1946) is an American philanthropist, author, and former diplomat, best known for her contributions to breast cancer awareness and research. She founded the Promise Fund and Susan G. Komen for the Cure. Brinker was also United States Ambassador to Hungary from 2001 to 2003 and Chief of Protocol of the United States from 2007 to the end of the George W. Bush administration. In 2011, she was appointed a Goodwill Ambassador for Cancer Control by the World Health Organization.

== Early life ==
Brinker (née Goodman) was born in Peoria, Illinois to the Jewish family of Marvin L. and Eleanor (née Newman) Goodman. Her father was a commercial real-estate developer, and her mother was a housewife. In 1968, she received a bachelor's degree from the University of Illinois. After graduating, she moved to Dallas, Texas and worked at Neiman Marcus as an assistant couture buyer. In the following years, she took various positions at other public relations firms before marrying businessman Norman Brinker.

== Career ==
=== Susan G. Komen ===
In 1982, following the death of her sister Susan G. Komen from breast cancer, Brinker founded Susan G. Komen for the Cure. The organization has since become the world's largest nonprofit source of funding for the fight against breast cancer, investing nearly $3 billion in research, community health outreach, advocacy, and programs in more than 60 countries. Brinker also established the Race for the Cure in 1983, which has grown into the world's largest series of 5K run/fitness walks, with over a million participants annually. The organization was named for Brinker's sister, who died of breast cancer. On December 2, 2009, Brinker was appointed CEO, a position in which she served in until June 17, 2013, when Judith A. Salerno succeeded her.

=== World Health Organization Goodwill Ambassador ===
Brinker served as the World Health Organization's Goodwill Ambassador for Cancer Control. She was appointed by WHO Director-General Margaret Chan on May 26, 2009. She advocated for strengthening global action for cancer prevention and control in the context of the Global Strategy for the Prevention and Control of Noncommunicable Diseases endorsed by the World Health Assembly in May 2008. Her message emphasized the need for low and middle-income countries to strengthen comprehensive and evidence-based cancer control policies and programs.

=== Chief of Protocol ===
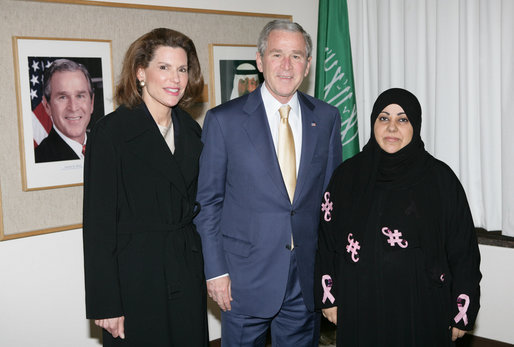
Brinker with President George W. Bush and Samia al-Amoudi in 2008

On October 7, 2008, Brinker hosted a symposium on "Breast Cancer Global Awareness" at the Blair House where First Lady Laura Bush attended.

As Chief of Protocol, Brinker expanded the role of the office through outreach programs intended to foster better relationships with the Diplomatic Corps. The effort, known as Diplomatic Partnerships involved over 60 events, including "Experience America", where the Diplomatic Corps traveled throughout the United States to meet with business and civic leaders.

=== Ambassador to Hungary ===
Brinker served as United States Ambassador to Hungary from September 2001 to 2003. She held the first conference on the trafficking and exploitation of workers that health ministers from the neighboring Balkan States attended. She also raised awareness about breast cancer among Hungarian women by leading a march over the Chain Bridge in Budapest where the bridge was illuminated in pink for the occasion.

Hungarian President Ferenc Mádl awarded Brinker with the Order of Merit, Medium Class, Cross Adorned with Star, for her work in advancing bilateral relations and in recognition of her charity activities.

=== The Promise Fund ===
The Promise Fund was created by Ambassador Nancy G. Brinker, Julie Fisher Cummings and Laurie Silvers in 2018. It was set up to address a lack of preventative diagnosis of breast cancer among women in South Florida. As of December 2024, the Promise Fund has reached 40,335 individuals through outreach and education and has impacted the lives of 14,576 women through access to screenings, diagnostics, and care.

== Other government service ==
In 1986, President Ronald Reagan appointed her to the National Cancer Advisory Board and in 1990, President George H. W. Bush appointed her to chair the President's Cancer Panel and monitor the progress of the National Cancer Program. In 1992, Vice President Dan Quayle invited her to chair a subcommittee monitoring research, progress and development in the fight against breast cancer.

Brinker was a bundler for George W. Bush when he was running for office, helping to organize and collect campaign contributions from other donors. In 2000, she became a Pioneer, a member of his $100,000 Club. And on December 24, 2008, President Bush appointed her to the board of trustees of the John F. Kennedy Center for the Performing Arts for a six-year term.

She testified before the United States Democratic Policy Committee's Congressional Breast Cancer Forum and participated in the International Women's Forum.

== Awards ==
Brinker has received the following awards and titles:

- 1995 University of Illinois Alumni Achievement Award
- The 1997 S. Roger Horchow Award for Greatest Public Service by a Private Citizen, awarded by Jefferson Awards
- The 2000 Cino del Duca Award, the James Ewing Layman Award from the Society of Surgical Oncology
- 2004 Service to America Leadership Award presented by the National Association of Broadcasters Educational Foundation
- 2005 Mary Woodard Lasker Public Service Award in Support of Medical Research
- The American Society of Breast Disease 2006
- In 2006, Nancy Brinker received an Honorary Doctorate of Humanities from Boston University.
- 2007 Trumpet Award
- 2007 Castle Connolly National Health Leadership Award
- 2007 Pro Cultura Hungarica Medal
- American Association for Cancer Research Centennial Medal for Distinguished Public Service in 2007
- 2007 IARC Medal of Honour
- Modern Healthcare 2007 Health Care Hall of Fame
- 2009 Porter Prize
- Presidential Medal of Freedom, awarded by President Barack Obama on August 12, 2009
- Reader's Digest Trust Poll: The 100 Most Trusted People in America, May 2013
- Inducted as a Laureate of The Lincoln Academy of Illinois and awarded the Order of Lincoln (the State's highest honor) by the Governor of Illinois in 2016 in the area of Social Services.
- National Women's Hall of Fame
- Texas Women's Hall of Fame
- Time magazine, 100 Most Influential People in the World
- Ladies' Home Journal's 100 Most Important Women of the 20th Century
- Biography Magazine's The 25 Most Powerful Women in America
- Anti-Defamation League Americanism Award
- The Ladies' Home Journal's Top 10 Champions of Women's Health
- Global Pathfinder Award
- The Champions of Excellence Award presented by the Centers for Disease Control
- ASCO Special Recognition Award
- Cancer Research and Treatment Fund, Inc. Cancer Survivors Hall of Fame
- The Sword of Ignatius Loyola Award from Saint Louis University
- The Albert Einstein's Sarnoff Volunteer Award
- The Champion of Prevention Award by the National Foundation for the Centers for Disease Control
- Inducted into the Cancer Research and Treatment Fund, Inc. Cancer Survivors Hall of Fame
- In 2011, Nancy Brinker received an Honorary Doctorate of Humane Letters from Mount Sinai School of Medicine.
- In 2012, Nancy Brinker received an Honorary Doctorate of Humane Letters from Duke University.
- In 2017, Nancy Brinker was named one of the “50 Women Who Are Changing the World” by Woman’s Day Magazine

== Publications ==
Brinker has co-authored four books:

- Promise Me: How a Sister's Love Launched the Global Movement to End Breast Cancer, co-authored with Joni Rodgers - September 14, 2010
- The Race is Run One Step at a Time, co-authored with Catherine McEvilly Harris
- 1000 Questions About Women's Health, co-authored with Dr. H. Jane Chihal
- Winning the Race: Taking Charge of Breast Cancer, co-authored with Chriss Anne Winston

Brinker wrote the forewords for:

- Tamoxifen for the Treatment and Prevention of Breast Cancer by V. Craig Jordan
- Tamoxifen: A Guide for Clinicians and Patients by V. Craig Jordan

== Personal ==
Nancy Goodman's first husband was Robert M. Leitstein, an executive at Neiman Marcus. Together they had one son, Eric, a hospitality and retail experience executive and businessman, but divorced in 1978.

On February 13, 1981, Nancy Goodman married Norman E. Brinker, founder of Brinker International, which provided access to capital and influence and enabled her role in public service. Norman Brinker provided funds and methodology for building the Komen foundation. The couple were major contributors to George W. Bush's first presidential campaign. They divorced shortly after the 2000 U.S. Presidential election, but Norman Brinker remained a board member of Komen for the Cure, having served on its board since its founding in 1982 until his death in 2009.

While ambassador, Brinker began to collect Hungarian art. Her collection spans 100 years, from just before the Austro-Hungarian Empire to the present and has been on display at several museums around the United States. The collection is one of the largest outside of Hungary. In 2016, Nancy Brinker was named Global Advisor to HOLOGIC Inc.

Brinker is a major funder of gay marriage initiatives. Nancy Brinker has been a lifetime member of the Council on Foreign Relations since 2012. She serves on the advisory board of the Harvey Milk Foundation.

Diplomatic posts
Preceded by Peter Tufo	U.S. Ambassador to Hungary; 2001–2003	Succeeded by George Herbert Walker III
