= Metromedia (disambiguation) =

Metromedia is an American media company.

Metromedia can also mean:

- Metromedia Fiber Network, Inc., later AboveNet
- Metromedia Restaurant Group
- Metromedia Square, the former Fox Television Center broadcast facility
- Metromedia, the post-1971 name for the sound system Tom the Great Sebastian
