= Valade =

Valade or Valadè is a surname. Notable people with the surname include:

- Ambrogio Valadé (1937–2007), Italian footballer
- Aymeline Valade (born 1984), French model and actress
- Georges Valade (1922–1997), Canadian politician
- Jean Valade (1710–1787), French painter
- Kelli Valade (born 1969), American businesswoman
- LaVonne Griffin-Valade (born 1952 or 1953), American civil servant
