= Metromedia Restaurant Group =

American casual dining company

- Fate: Bankrupt
- Products: Casual dining

The Metromedia Restaurant Group was an American casual dining company that operated and franchised more than 800 restaurants under the names Steak and Ale, Bennigan's, Bonanza, Ponderosa, The Plano Tavern, The Southlake Tavern and the 29 Degree Tavern. The company was headquartered in Plano, Texas. It was part of the Metromedia Company, which was privately owned by businessman John Kluge until his death and is related in lineage to the former entertainment company of the same name.

== Bankruptcy of S&A Restaurant Group ==
Metromedia Restaurant Group formerly operated certain Bennigan's and Steak and Ale restaurants under the S&A Restaurant Group division. This division was forced into an involuntary Chapter 7 liquidation by its lender, GE Capital, in August 2008, and closed over 300 company-owned Bennigan's and Steak & Ale restaurants. The franchise-owned Bennigan's locations were not named as debtors in the bankruptcy and continued to operate, nor were the Bonanza and Ponderosa Steakhouse chains, operated by a different subsidiary, Metromedia Steakhouses Co. LP, affected by the filing. Atalaya Capital Management bought the Bennigan's and Steak and Ale brands and their franchisor later that year.
