= Ponderosa and Bonanza Steakhouses =

American restaurant company

Ponderosa Steakhouse; Bonanza Steakhouse
- Type: Wholly owned subsidiary
- Industry: Casual dining, buffet Franchising
- Founded: 1963; 63 years ago in Westport, Connecticut, as Bonanza; 1965; 61 years ago in Kokomo, Indiana, as Ponderosa; 1997; 29 years ago in Plano, Texas, as Ponderosa-Bonanza
- Headquarters: Beverly Hills, California
- Number of locations: 15 in U.S.; 36 worldwide (2026)
- Products: Steak, salad, seafood
- Parent: FBG Brand Co.
- Website: pon-bon.com

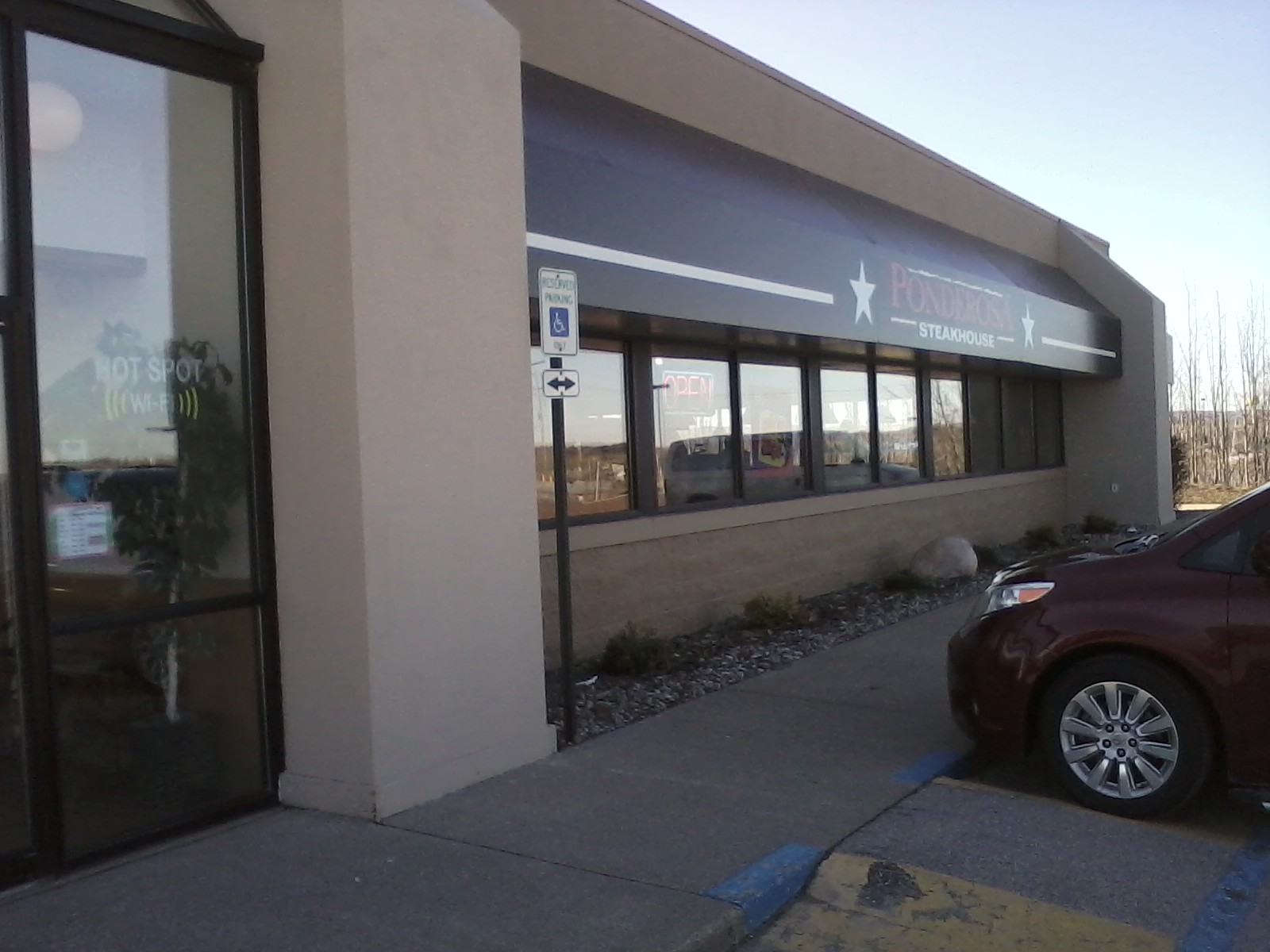
A Ponderosa Steakhouse in West Branch, Michigan (now closed).

Ponderosa Steakhouse and Bonanza Steakhouse are a chain of buffet/steakhouse restaurants that has been a part of Beverly Hills-based FBG Bid Co. since 2026. Its menu includes steaks, hamburgers, seafood, and chicken and potato entrées, all of which come with their buffet. A lunch menu is also served.

Unlike some other chains with two names which use only one of the names in a given region, restaurants in the same locale could be named either Bonanza or Ponderosa. This is because Bonanza and Ponderosa were separate companies, which were later merged under the Metromedia Restaurant Group.

The names of the restaurants were derived from the TV series Bonanza, which was set at a place called Ponderosa Ranch. An unrelated Ponderosa restaurant (which also serves steak) in Derry, Northern Ireland, is named that way because the family of Niall Regan, the owner in the 1970s, resembled the cast of the TV show.

== History ==
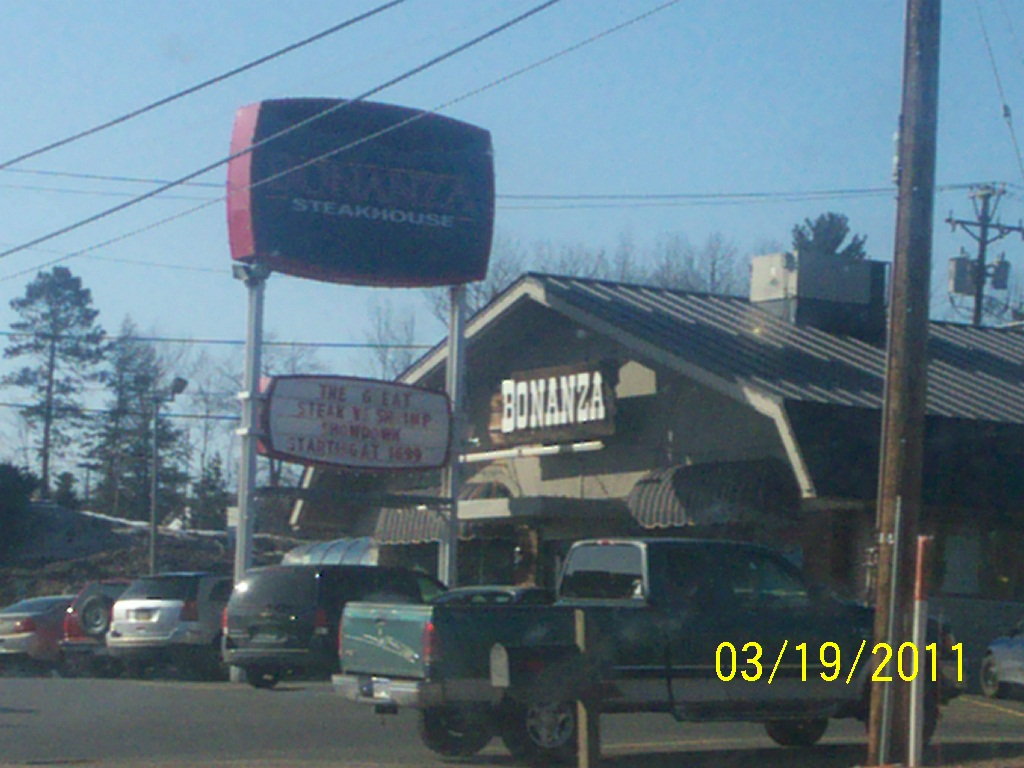
A Bonanza steakhouse in Marquette, Michigan, in 2011. This location has since closed.

In 1963, Dan Blocker, who played Eric "Hoss" Cartwright on Bonanza, started the Bonanza Steakhouse chain. The first Bonanza opened in Westport, Connecticut. Sam Wyly and his brother Charles Wyly bought the small Bonanza restaurant chain three years later. The company grew to approximately 600 restaurants by 1989, when the Wylys sold it to Metromedia.

In 1965, Dan Lasater, Norm Wiese and Charles Kleptz founded Ponderosa in Kokomo, Indiana, moving the headquarters to Dayton, Ohio, in 1971.

Ponderosa began operating in Canada by 1971 and until 1986, when its focus moved to post-recession US, had nearly 150 locations across the country. After closing most Canadian Ponderosa restaurants, the company returned to generating US restaurant franchises in 1986, reversing a previous freeze on new US franchises in the move to Canada. At that time, 36 Canadian Ponderosa locations were acquired by General Mills Restaurant Group which converted them to Red Lobster restaurants. In the meantime, Bonanza maintained a presence in Canada. The last Canadian location closed in November 2010.

In February 1988, Ponderosa was sold to Metromedia Restaurant Group. In September 1989, Metromedia also acquired rival Bonanza, but kept the chains as separate legal entities until 1997 when Metromedia combined the individual Ponderosa and Bonanza chains into a single Metromedia Family Steakhouses (MFS) organization in which each restaurant within the new organization could be marketed under either the Ponderosa or Bonanza brands. MFS was one of founder John Kluge's companies using the Metromedia name.

After its S&A Restaurant Group division was forced into an involuntary Chapter 7 liquidation by its lender, GE Capital, in August 2008, and closed over 300 company-owned Bennigan's and Steak & Ale restaurants, the chain's parent company, Metromedia Steakhouses Company, filed for Chapter 11 bankruptcy in 2008, although it planned to reorganize around franchise operations and a profitable core of company-operated restaurants. It emerged from bankruptcy in 2009 under the name "Homestyle Dining LLC".

The chain engaged Trinity Capital LLC as its financial advisor in 2016 and was sold in late 2017 to FAT Brands, the owner of Fatburger, Buffalo's Cafe and Hurricane Grill & Wings. FAT Brands has approximately 300 locations open, with another 300 under development in 32 countries.

In 1989, there were almost 700 Ponderosa locations. By 2003, there were fewer than 400 locations. By December 2024, only 12 Ponderosa locations and three Bonanza locations remain open in the US.

On January 26, 2026, parent company FAT Brands filed for Chapter 11 bankruptcy protection in an effort to shed billions of dollars in debt. The company listed assets and liabilities between $1 billion and $10 billion. After receiving court approval for the sale of its assets, FBG Bid Co. officially acquired the remaining assets from FAT Brands for $595 million on June 18, 2026, including Ponderosa and Bonanza.

== See also ==
- List of buffet restaurants
