= Yia Yia Mary's =

Pair of Greek restaurants in Houston, Texas

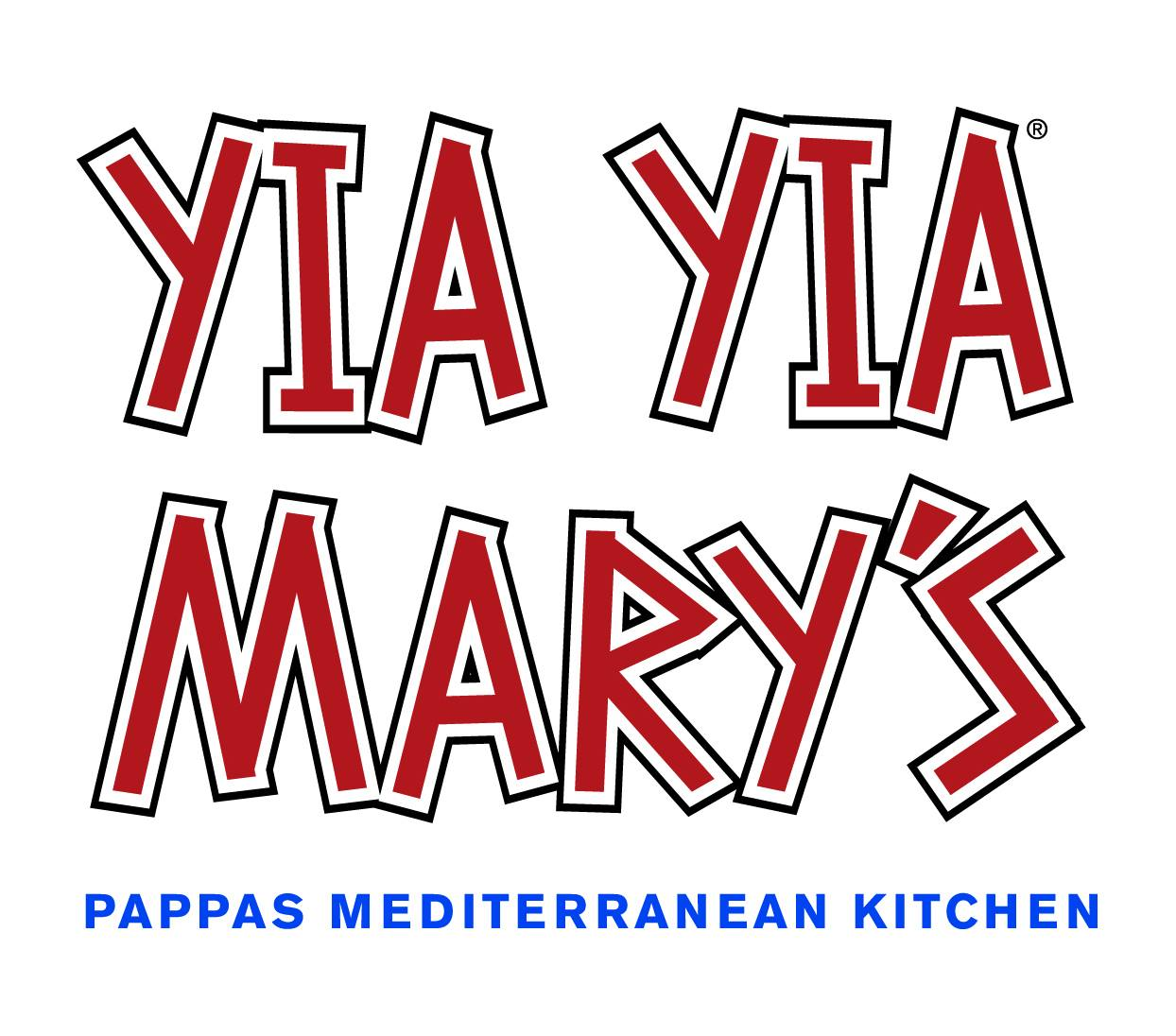

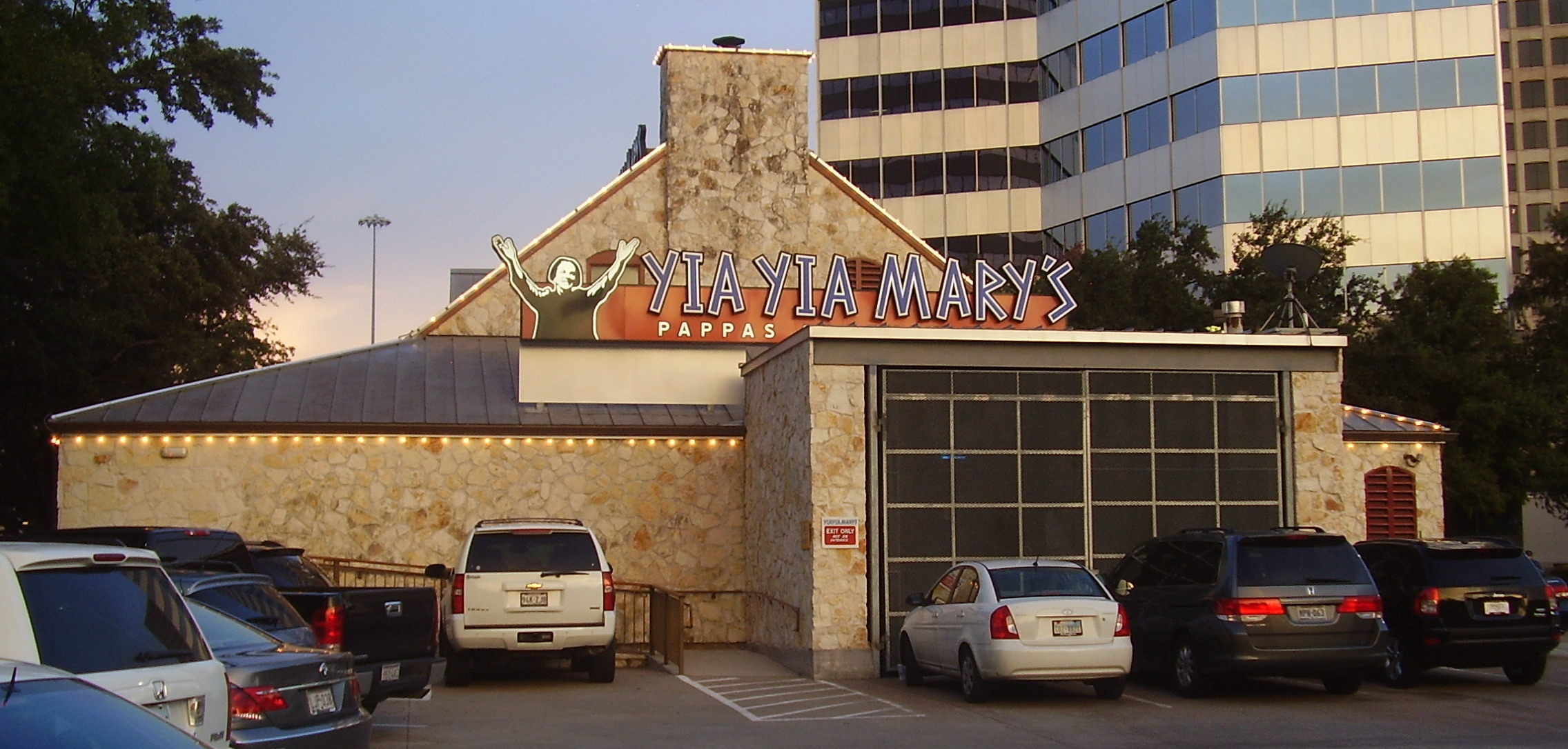
- Exterior of the Uptown location
- Interactive map of Yia Yia Mary's

Restaurant information
- Established: 2004 (Uptown Houston); 2015 (William P. Hobby Airport)
- Closed: May 2020 (Hobby Airport); June 2020 (Uptown)
- Owner: Pappas Restaurants
- Food type: Greek; seafood
- Dress code: Casual
- Location: 4747 San Felipe Street, Houston, Harris, Texas, 77056, United States
- Coordinates: 29.7481°N 95.4576°W

Yia Yia Mary's (sometimes referred to as Yia Yia Mary's Greek Kitchen and Yia Yia Mary's Mediterranean Kitchen) was a Greek restaurant with two locations in Houston, in the U.S. state of Texas. Pappas Restaurants opened the Uptown Houston restaurant in 2004, and a second Yia Yia Mary's began operating at William P. Hobby Airport in 2015. The restaurants served Greek cuisine including seafood and garnered a generally positive reception. Both locations closed in 2020, during the COVID-19 pandemic.

== Description ==
Yia Yia Mary's was owned by Pappas Restaurants and served Greek cuisine at restaurants in Uptown Houston and William P. Hobby Airport. The Uptown restaurant's interior had a "soaring wood-beamed ceiling and stately stone walls", according to the Houston Press, and featured a wood-burning grill and "omnipresent" televisions. The Houston Chronicle described the interior decor as "wildly eclectic" and "full of bright signs and dramatic architecture", with a high vaulted ceiling, large wooden beams, and "impressive drop lights scattered throughout". There were two stone fireplaces, both of which had large mounted swordfish above mantles, as well as a mural of Greek settings and a "luxuriously appointed" bar.

The wall opposite the kitchen and counter with five mounted televisions displayed Greek food signs. Guests placed orders at the counter during lunch and had orders taken by waiting staff during evening hours. Staff wore jeans and blue or black T-shirts with the restaurant's logo, as of 2004. Patrons ate at wooden tables covered with blue checkered tablecloths and set with bottles of Apella wine available for purchase. The restaurant played Greek music in the background. Houstonia described the interior as "cavernous" and said Yia Yia Mary's was "the area's only Greek fish specialist".

The airport restaurant was located near Gate 1.

=== Menu ===
The menu at the Uptown restaurant included seafood such as branzino, calamari, lobster, and shrimp, as well as gyros served with French fries, lamb, moussaka, pastitsio, saganaki, souvlaki (beef, chicken, or lamb), and spanakopita. Gyros had rotisserie-cooked beef and lamb in pita with onions, tomatoes, and tzatziki. The lobster oregano was served with Greek salad and herb rice or lemon-buttered roasted potatoes. The meze (appetizer) menu had baked feta, dolmades, fried calamari, Greek meatballs, and lamb chops steeped in garlic and oregano, and roasted eggplant dip.

The appetizer sampler had pita, olives, and five dips, including eggplant with garlic and olive oil, hummus, one made with red peppers and feta, skordalia, and caviar-flavored taramasalata. The "Yia Yia sampler" had feta in olive oil and was served with dolmades, pita, spanakopita, and tiropita. Side salads had iceberg lettuce, tomatoes, feta, and pickled peppers. Happy hour was available all day on Wednesdays, as of 2017. The airport restaurant had gluten-free and vegetable-based options, as well as a falafel platter.

== History ==
Pappas Restaurants opened Yia Yia Mary's in early 2004. Chris and Harris Pappas, descendants of Greek emigrant H.D. Pappas, owned Pappas at the time. The brothers named the restaurant after their grandmother Mary ("Yia Yia" means "Grandma" in Greek), and the interior displayed photographs of her. The restaurant was popular early on; in March, the Houston Chronicle described a full parking lot during lunch time and the presence of traffic police outside. By mid 2006, carpeting had been installed in the dining area, lowering the noise level, and standard table service had replaced the "fast-food, walk-up counter concept".

In 2012, a former Yia Yia Mary's employee filed a lawsuit over wage disputes and claimed Pappas Restaurants "failed to pay Plaintiff and other wait staff the minimum wage". The plaintiff said the invalid tip pool "included workers who were not customarily and regularly tipped, including, [...] each restaurant's dishwashing staff", and sought damages to "recover compensation for [...] unpaid minimum wages, including the full amount of tips received", for current and former waiting staff "who were paid with a tip credit and required to contribute to a tip pool", and attorney's fees.

The restaurant's meatloaf was featured on the menu of Pappas Meat Co., a steakhouse opened by Pappas Restaurants in 2014. Yia Yia Mary's was announced as a vendor at Hobby Airport in July 2015. Both locations closed in 2020, during the COVID-19 pandemic. The Yia Yia Mary's at Hobby Airport closed in May, and the Uptown restaurant closed in June. Employees were relocated to other restaurants owned by Pappas Restaurants.

== Reception ==
In a positive review published by the Houston Chronicle in 2004, The Mystery Diner recommended the lamb chop appetizer and wrote, "if you like Greek food, this is a great place to visit. And if you try the lamb chop appetizers, don't say I didn't warn you. They are maddening, they're so good." They also wrote that "[l]ike a lot of Pappas restaurants, this place is NOISY. At peak rush hour, you can hardly hear yourself think, much less chew." Yia Yia Mary's was nominated in the Best New Restaurant category in the Houston Business Journal's Reader's Dining Survey in 2004. In 2006, Robb Walsh of the Houston Press appreciated the lower noise level, which he said was "unbearable" upon opening. He called the sampler dips and the gyro with fries "outstanding" the taramosalata "excellent". Conversely, Walsh criticized the moussaka, the chicken souvlaki sandwich (which he called "too boring to finish"), and the salad with beef souvlaki, which "proved doubly disappointing". He opined, "The fresh-scrubbed college kids who work as servers at Yia Yia Mary's make it possible for xenophobic Houstonians to eat Greek food without having to enter a hive of swarthy foreigners... It may be Greek, but it's still a Pappas Bros. restaurant, after all: a big, efficient, impersonal operation where the sandwiches come in plastic baskets, the bathrooms are always spotless, and you don't have to deal with any colorful personalities."

Yia Yia Mary's was a finalist in the Best Greek category in OutSmart's Readers' Choice Awards in 2011, 2015, and 2017. In her Insiders' Guide to Houston (2012), Laura Nathan-Garner recommended the appetizer menu's baked feta, roasted eggplant dip, and spanakopita for a variety of foods on a budget and wrote, "All of the options can feel a little overwhelming at this Pappas-owned restaurant. But just about everything—from the moussaka to the Greek salad to the pita to the souvlaki—is worth a try." In 1,000 Foods to Eat Before You Die (2015), Mimi Sheraton recommended Yia Yia Mary's for pastitsio and saganaki. In 2015, Katerina Papathanasiou of the Greek Reporter said Yia Yia Mary's "hosts the perfect menu of authentic Greek cuisine" and recommended the "fabulous" appetizers. Katharine Shilcutt included Yia Yia Mary's in Houstonia's 2016 list of the ten best eateries in Houston's airports and called the falafel platter "heavenly". The magazine's Alice Levitt included Yia Yia Mary's in her 2016 list of the city's ten "greatest" Greek restaurants. The Houston Chronicle's Andrea Leinfelder recommended the Greek salads in her 2016 overview of "Houston airport dining on a budget". In 2019, Amy McCarthy of Eater Houston and Darla Guillen Gilthorpe and Jay R. Jordan of the Houston Chronicle included Yia Yia Mary's in overviews of recommended eateries at Hobby Airport.

== See also ==
- Greek-American cuisine
- Impact of the COVID-19 pandemic on the restaurant industry in the United States
- List of Greek restaurants
- List of seafood restaurants
- Mediterranean cuisine
