= Pappas Restaurants =

Multi-brand restaurant chain in America

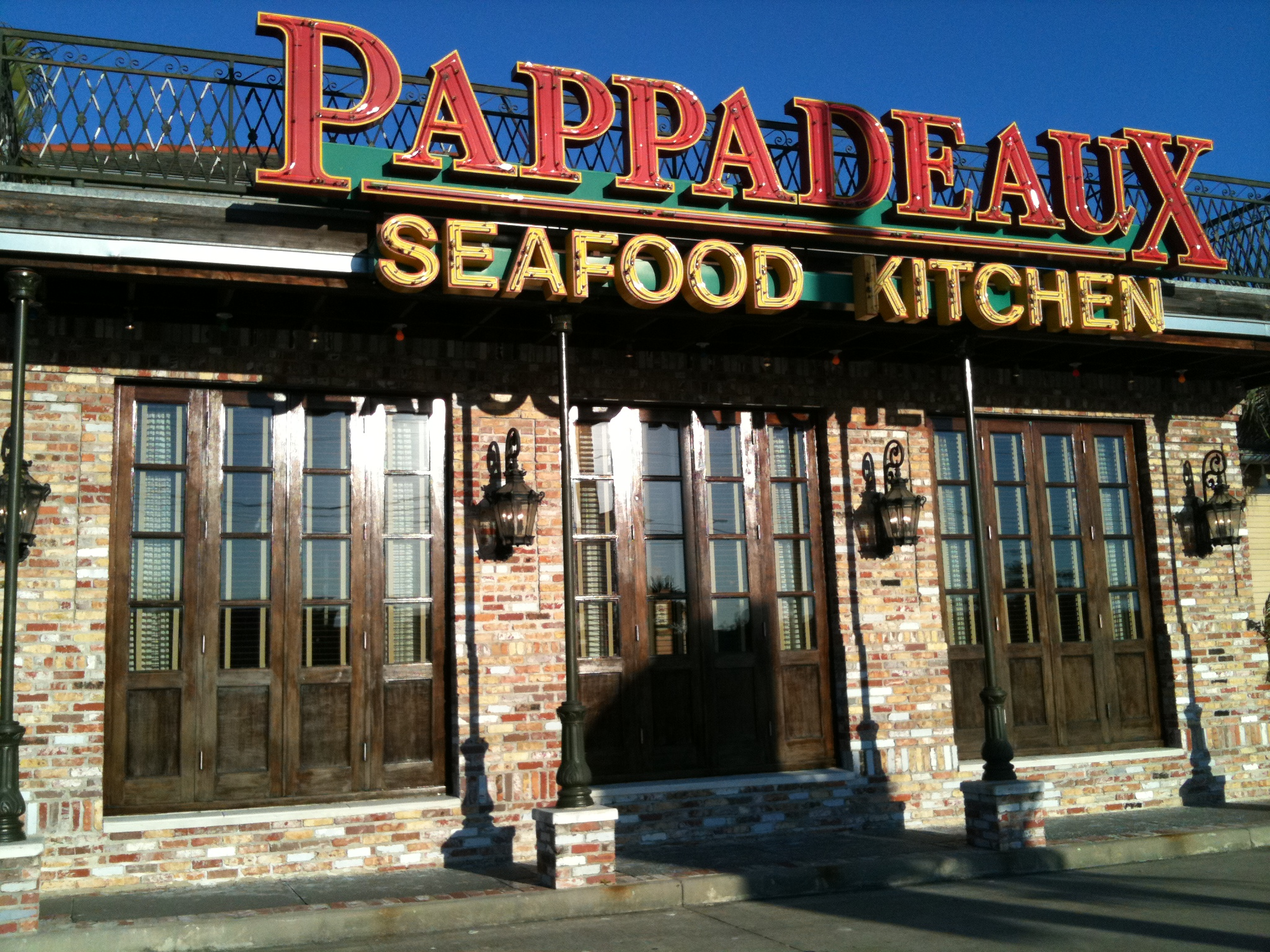
- Pappadeaux Seafood Kitchen
- Industry: Restaurant
- Founded: Houston, Texas
- Headquarters: United States
- Area served: United States
- Products: Seafood

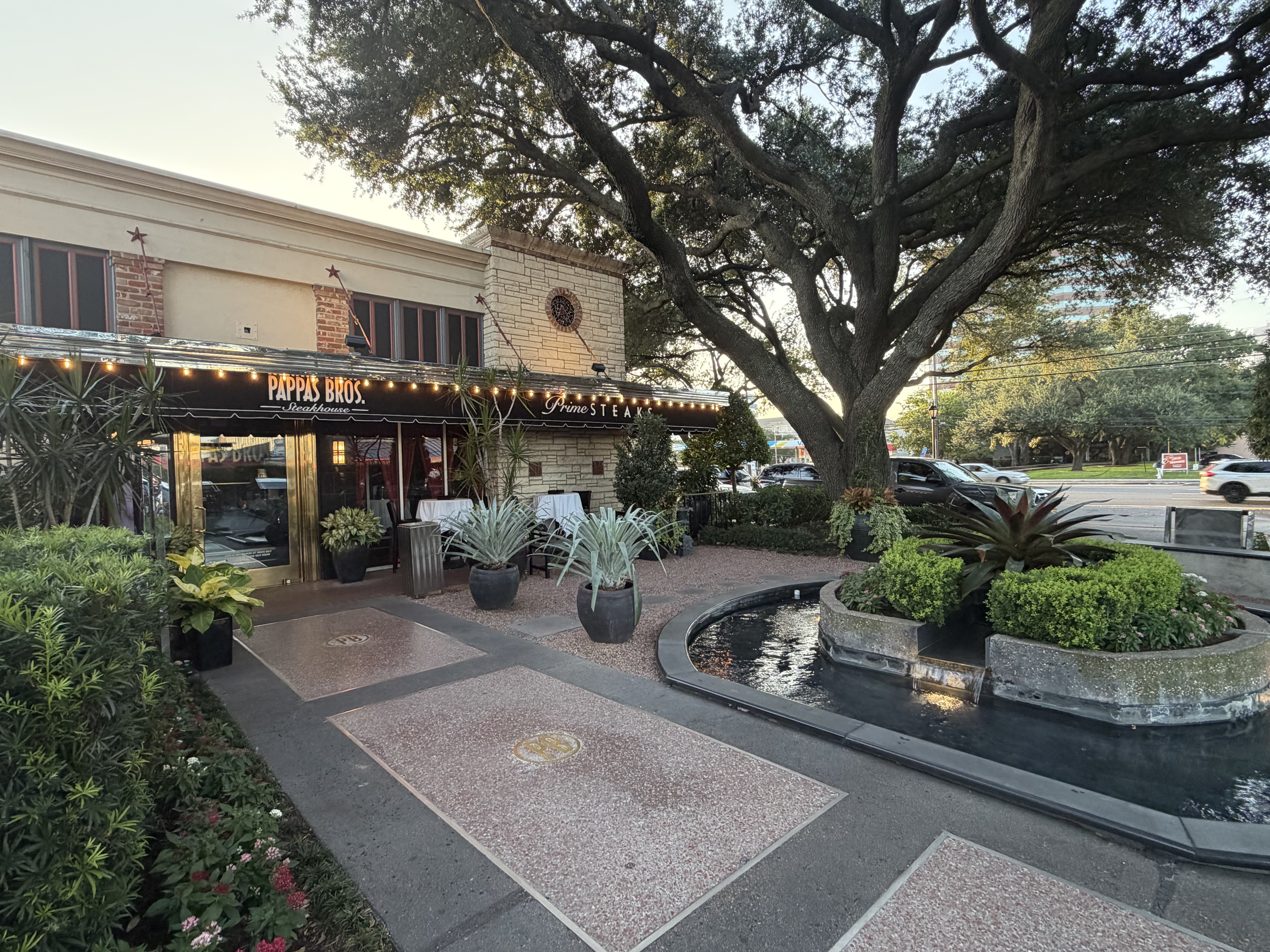
Pappas Bros. Steakhouse in Houston, TX in July 2026

Pappas Restaurants, Inc. (or simply Pappas Restaurants) is a privately held restaurant chain in the Southern and Southwestern United States. It is headquartered in Houston, Texas. Its brands include Pappas Bros. Steakhouse, Pappas Seafood, Pappas Bar-B-Q, Pappas Burger, Pappadeaux Seafood Kitchen, Pappasitos Cantina, Pappas Delta Blues Smokehouse, Little's Oyster Bar, Dot Coffee Shop, and Yiayia's Greek Kitchen. They had formerly acquired On the Border Mexican Grill & Cantina in 2025 and closed all remaining locations in 2026.

== Awards ==
In the December 2007 issue of Texas Monthly, Pappas Bros. Steakhouse was named the best steakhouse in Texas.

Since 2010, Pappas Bros. Steakhouse Houston has been the recipient of the Wine Spectator Grand Award. Pappas Bros. Steakhouse Dallas has held the same award since 2011.

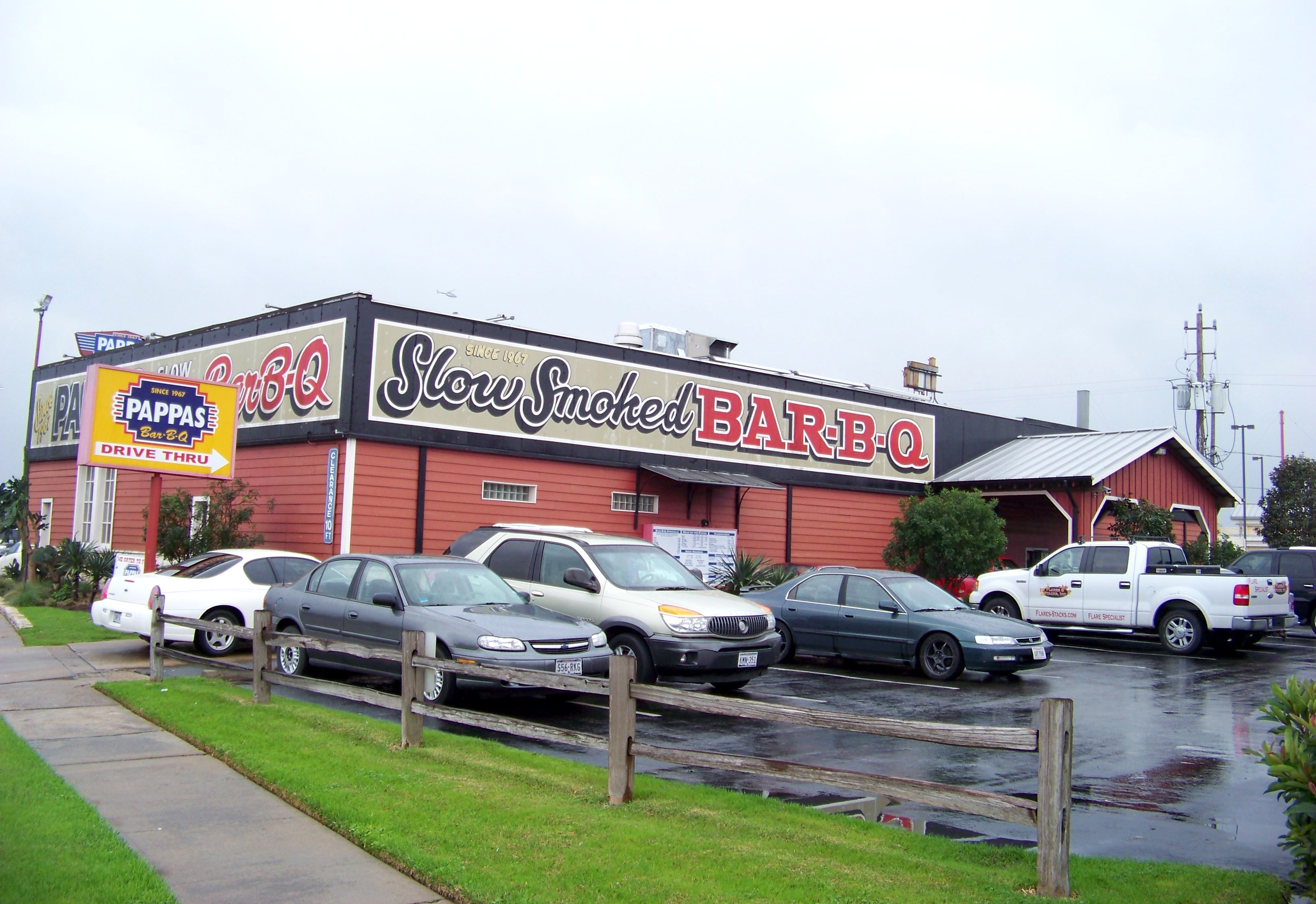
Pappas BBQ

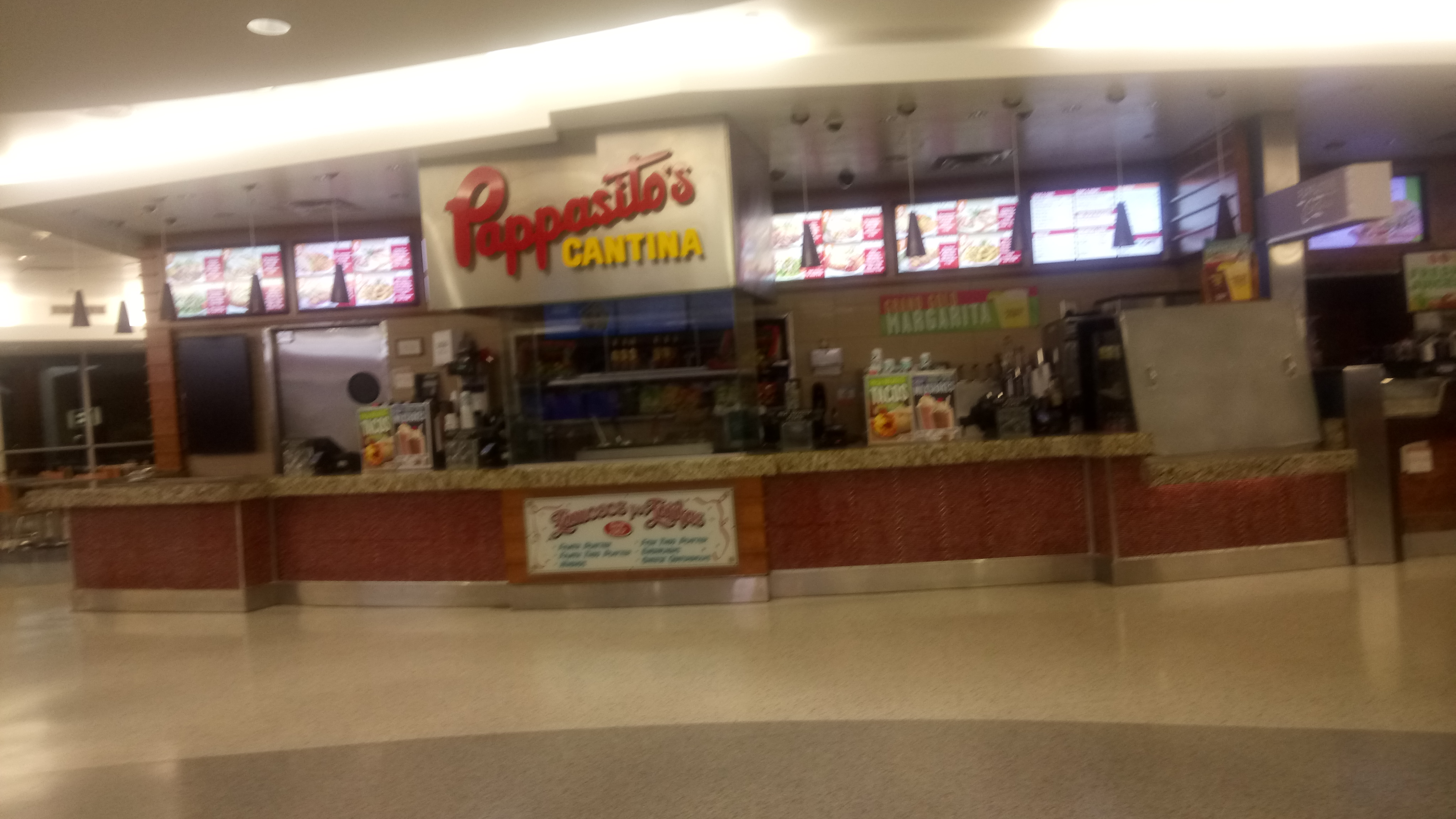
Pappasitos at George Bush Intercontinental Airport Terminal C

== See also ==
- List of barbecue restaurants
- List of seafood restaurants
- Yia Yia Mary's
