= Samia al-Amoudi =

Saudi Arabian physician

Dr. Samia al-Amoudi
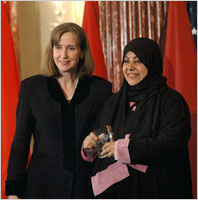
- al-Amoudi (R) and Paula Dobriansky (L) in 2007
- Born: ساميه العمودي
- Occupation: Professor
- Known for: Saudi breast cancer awareness
- Medical career
- Profession: Physician
- Field: OB/GYN
- Institutions: Sheikh Mohammed Hussein Al-Amoudi Center of Excellence; King Abdulaziz University
- Research: Breast cancer
- Notable works: Breast Cancer, Break the Silence
- Awards: International Women of Courage Award

Samia al-Amoudi (Arabic: ساميه العمودي) is a Saudi Arabian obstetrician and gynecologist, healthcare activist and professor. She is the head of the Sheikh Mohammed Hussein Al-Amoudi Center of Excellence in breast cancer. She is best known for her work in raising breast cancer awareness, after diagnosing herself with the disease. She is also the first woman from the Gulf Cooperation Council to sit on the Union for International Cancer Control board.

== Life and career ==
In 1981, Al-Amoudi was among the first doctors to graduate from the medical college in King Abdulaziz University.

In April 2006, she diagnosed herself with breast cancer, for which she underwent chemotherapy. She was the first Saudi woman to write publicly about her experience of the disease, which she did in a series of articles in a weekly column in the Al Madinah newspaper. She also appeared on a daily TV show.

In March 2007, she was presented with an inaugural International Women of Courage Award by Condoleezza Rice of the United States Department of State.

In 2010, she was ranked fifth on the Power 100 list, which is Arabian Business's annual listing of the world's most influential Arabs. Al-Amoudi was also later ranked by Arabian Business, as 37th in 2015 and 66th in 2016 of the "100 Most Powerful Arab Women 2016 - Healthcare & Science".

Since 2012, the year she completed her cancer treatment, she has been head of the Sheikh Mohammed Hussein Al-Amoudi Center of Excellence in breast cancer and scientific chair for breast cancer at KAU, Jeddah Saudi Arabia, and is GE Healthcare's #GetFit Ambassador.

Al-Mahoudi is CEO of Sheikh Mohammed Hussien Al-Amoudi Center of Excellence in Breast Cancer, is the Scientific breast cancer chair, a member of the BHGI steering committee, and an associate professor and consultant obstetrician gynecologist, at King Abdulaziz University, Jeddah, Saudi Arabia.

== Works ==
- Breast Cancer, Break the Silence, 2007.
