= Steak and Ale =

American chain of casual dining restaurants

- Type: Private
- Industry: Restaurant
- Founded: February 26, 1966; 60 years ago
- Founder: Norman Brinker
- Headquarters: Dallas, Texas, U.S.
- Number of locations: 1
- Owner: Paul Mangiamele Legendary Chairman and CEO
- Website: steakandale.com

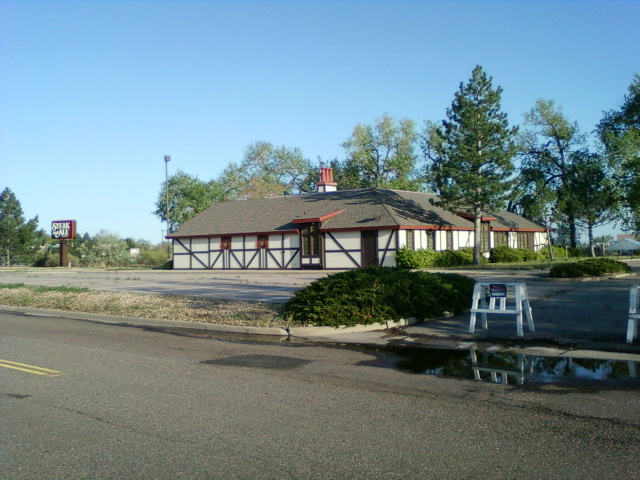
Abandoned Steak and Ale restaurant, Westminster Mall, Colorado (2011)

Steak and Ale is an American chain of restaurants that was influential in the growth of casual dining. Founded in 1966, it achieved major success in the 1970s and 1980s before declaring Chapter 7 bankruptcy proceeding and closing its remaining 58 locations on July 29, 2008. The first new Steak and Ale restaurant since then opened on July 8, 2024, in Burnsville, Minnesota, with more planned for the Midwest and Texas.

Steak and Ale was opened in Dallas, Texas, on February 26, 1966, by Norman E. Brinker, one of the most influential American restaurateurs of the 20th century. After the bankruptcy, its brand, recipes, and other intellectual property were purchased by Legendary Restaurant Brands, LLC, the parent company for Bennigan's.

== Fare ==
Popular menu items at Steak and Ale included the signature herb-roasted prime rib, Kensington club, New York strip, filet mignon, Hawaiian chicken, and spicy grilled chicken pasta. The restaurant featured an unlimited salad bar or a choice of soup with most of its entrees on the dinner menu. It also featured free drink refills and a honey wheat bread. Steak and Ale also offered a lunch menu with many items for $6.99. During the mid-1990s, in an attempt to revitalize lagging sales, the "Early Evening" menu was introduced. In addition to lower prices, all the "Early Evening" fares included a free beverage and free dessert. Some of the complimentary dessert selections were strawberry sundown cake, twilight triple fudge cake, and spice cake. The restaurant also featured wine samples for only 25 cents.

== History ==
Restaurant pioneer Norman Brinker founded Steak and Ale in 1966 in Dallas, at the corner of Oak Lawn and Lemmon avenues in Oak Lawn. The chain, with its dimly lit Tudor-style decorated dining rooms, billed itself as offering an upscale steak experience at lower prices. It was seen as a model for the casual-dining steakhouse chain, and many executives there went on to run other large chains.

It remained an independent chain until 1976, when Pillsbury purchased it and folded it into its restaurant group with Burger King, Bennigan's, Poppin Fresh Pies and other stores. At the time, the company had 113 locations of Steak and Ale and Jolly Ox (the name Steak and Ale used in markets that did not allow a reference to liquor in a restaurant name).

In 1982, Pillsbury spun off the company and Bennigan's into the independent S&A Restaurant Corp. Steak and Ale grew as one of the first chain dinner houses to its height in the late 1980s with 280 locations, before competition that the brand helped inspire eroded its market presence. In 1988, Metromedia purchased the company. In 1993, the company was merged with the Metromedia Steak Houses chains Bonanza and Ponderosa, and all three chains were operated under the S&A Restaurant Group brand.

The S&A Restaurant Corp bankruptcy in July 2008 affected the Bennigan's restaurant chain, also owned by that company; all of the company-owned stores closed the same day as the Steak and Ale restaurants. Franchised Bennigan's locations remained open.

The MetroMedia Company also owns the Ponderosa and Bonanza Steakhouse chains, which were not affected by the bankruptcy filing; they are operated by a different subsidiary of the company.

Private investment company Oak Point Partners acquired the remnant assets, consisting of any known and unknown assets that were not previously administered, from the S&A Restaurant Corp., et al., Bankruptcy Estates on August 15, 2013.

== Planned revivals ==
In 2013, a Facebook page was created for the comeback of Steak and Ale, and Bennigan's CEO Paul Mangiamele announced that the chain would be part of Bennigan's comeback concept.

On February 11, 2015, CEO Paul Mangiamele and his wife, Gwen, closed on a management buyout of the company from its parent private-equity firm, for an undisclosed price. The new company, Legendary Restaurant Brands, LLC, is now 100% owner of the Bennigan's restaurant chain, its fast-casual concept Bennigan's On the Fly, and the Steak and Ale brand. As of December 2018, the Bennigan's website is offering potential franchisees the opportunity to "Own A Steak and Ale".

In June 2016, Mangiamele announced that Steak and Ale would return with its first five locations opening in Mexico City. No restaurant has opened there as of 2024.

In June 2020, Mangiamele announced that the first revamped Steak and Ale location was under construction and scheduled to open in 2021 in Cancún, Mexico. No Cancun location opened. In 2018, Legendary kept the Steak and Ale brand alive by adding some of the chain's signature dishes to the Bennigan's menu.

In 2023, the company announced its latest plans for a revival in the United States. The first location, in Burnsville, Minnesota, opened on July 9, 2024. A second restaurant was scheduled to open in 2024 in Grand Prairie, Texas, as a side-by-side Steak and Ale and Bennigan’s location. In May 2025, CultureMap Dallas reported that the planned Grand Prairie location was no longer moving forward; Mangiamele attributed the cancellation to the franchise partner changing course and attempting to sell the land at a price he considered above market value.
