= On the Border Mexican Grill & Cantina =

Tex-Mex restaurant franchise

- Type: Private
- Industry: Restaurant
- Founded: October 29, 1982; 43 years ago
- Defunct: June 12, 2026; 4 months ago
- Fate: Closed by parent company
- Headquarters: 2201 W. Royal Lane, Suite 240; Irving, Texas; United States
- Number of locations: 74
- Products: Tex-Mex Cuisine
- Revenue: ▼US$361 Million (2020)
- Owner: Brinker International (1994–2010); OTB Acquisition LLC (2010–2014); Argonne Capital Group (2014-2025); Pappas Restaurants (2025)
- Number of employees: 5,724 (2020)
- Website: www.ontheborder.com

On The Border Mexican Grill & Cantina was an American chain of Tex-Mex food casual dining restaurants. The chain and brand name since 2025 was owned by Pappas Restaurants.

== History ==
The first On The Border location opened on October 29, 1982, in Dallas, Texas. In 1994, the chain lost its wholly owned subsidiary designation when it was merged into Brinker International as a company brand. In 2010, Brinker International sold On the Border to Golden Gate Capital. OTB Acquisition LLC, an affiliate of Golden Gate Capital, announced that it had completed its acquisition of On The Border Mexican Grill & Cantina from Brinker International, Inc. (NYSE: EAT). On April 24, 2014, the chain was sold to Argonne Capital Group, another private equity firm.

In February 2025, both locations in Long Island, New York were closed permanently. On March 5, 2025, On the Border filed for Chapter 11 bankruptcy protection, listing assets and liabilities between $10 million and $50 million. The company blamed inflation, rising interest costs and low traffic demand as factors contributing to the bankruptcy filing.

Pappas Restaurants Inc. revealed on May 7, 2025 it would be bringing On the Border into its portfolio following a successful auction bid.

On June 10, 2026, managers at several locations confirmed that Pappas Restaurants would be shutting down all remaining company-owned On the Border restaurants nationwide by June 12, 2026 as it filed for Chapter 7 bankruptcy. Franchise-owned restaurants in South Dakota, Florida, Nevada, California and South Korea will remain open past the June 12th date but will be forced to rename their restaurants at a later date as the On The Border company will cease to exist.

== Restaurants ==
The chain at one time operated over 150 restaurants within the United States and thirteen locations (7 stores in Seoul, Bucheon, Goyang, Hanam, Suwon, Daejeon and Busan) in South Korea. However, as part of the March 2025 bankruptcy filing, half of the locations permanently closed.

== Products ==
The restaurant is known for its selection of fajitas and wide selection of margaritas. It is also known for "Guacamole Live," the preparation of fresh guacamole tableside.

== Criticism ==
For several consecutive years, Men's Health rated On the Border as one of the unhealthiest chains on its annual "Restaurant Report Card." In 2010, the magazine named On the Border the worst chain in its Mexican category, noting that an enchilada meal contained over 1,600 calories, and desserts typically contained over 1,000 calories each.

== See also ==
- List of restaurants in Dallas
