= Chili's =

Casual dining restaurant chain

Chili's Grill & Bar
- Logo used since September 24, 2011

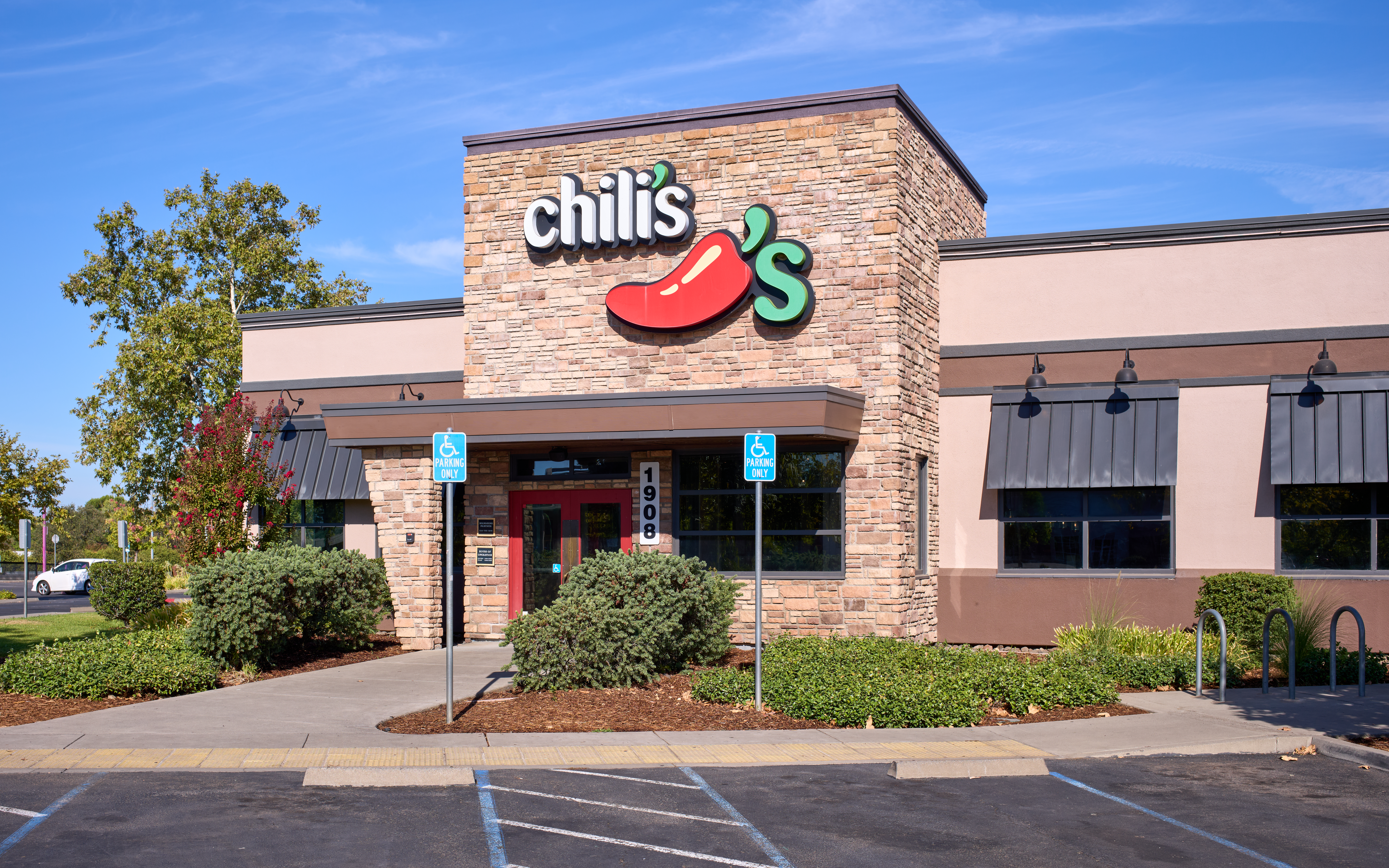
- Chili's location in Chico, California in 2026
- Type: Subsidiary
- Industry: Restaurant Franchising
- Genre: Casual dining
- Founded: March 13, 1975; 51 years ago
- Founder: Larry Lavine
- Headquarters: 3000 Olympus Blvd; Coppell, Texas 75019; US
- Number of locations: 1,610 (2020)
- Area served: Worldwide
- Key people: Kevin Hochman (CEO)
- Products: Tex-Mex, American cuisine
- Parent: Brinker International
- Website: chilis.com

Chili's Grill & Bar (stylized as chili's) is an American casual dining restaurant chain founded by Larry Lavine in Texas in 1975 and is currently owned and operated by Brinker International.

== History ==
Chili's first location, a converted postal station on Greenville Avenue in the Vickery Meadows area of Dallas, Texas, opened in 1975. The original Chili's on Greenville Avenue moved to a new building on the same site in 1981; it relocated again in 2007.

Lavine's concept was to create an informal, full-service dining restaurant with a menu featuring different types of hamburgers offered at an affordable price. The brand grew larger, and by the early 1980s, there were 28 Chili's locations in the region, all featuring similar Southwest decor.

The restaurant was named Chili's because they had chili on the menu and "figured it was something people would talk about," according to a 2022 interview with Lavine.

In 1983, Lavine sold the brand to restaurant executive Norman E. Brinker, formerly of the Pillsbury restaurant group that owned Bennigan's.

== Menu ==
Chili's serves American food, Tex-Mex cuisine and dishes influenced by Mexican cuisine, such as shrimp tacos, quesadillas, and fajitas.

In addition to their regular menu, the company offers a nutritional menu, allergen menu, and vegetarian menu.

== Advertising ==
"Chili's (Welcome to Chili's!)" is an advertising jingle used in Chili's Restaurant commercials to advertise the restaurant's line of baby back ribs. The song was written by Guy Bommarito and produced by Tom Faulkner Productions for GSD&M Advertising of Austin, Texas. Faulkner sings both "I want my baby back, baby back, baby back ribs..." (which is similar to the Tommy James song "Draggin' the Line"), as well as the melodic theme. The deep "Bar-B-Q sauce" line was sung by famed New York bass vocalist Willie McCoy. A 1996 rendition of the jingle features a doo-wop quartet, Take 6, singing a cappella. Advertising Age magazine named the song first on its list of "10 songs most likely to get stuck in your head" in 2004. In October 2017, the jingle was revived to advertise Chili's new menu, where it was re-conceptualized as "Oh Baby, Chili's Is Back (Baby, Back, Baby, Back)".

In 2008, the chain aired parody ads for "P. J. Bland's", a fictional restaurant chain with cardboard foods. In 2012, Chili's used Wendy Rene's Stax single, "Bar-B-Q", in their TV commercial. In September 2017, Chili's dropped about 40 percent of its menu items to focus on burgers, ribs, and fajitas.

In February 2020 Chili's announced a new marketing campaign encouraging people to "laugh so hard you pee a little". In September 2024, Chili's announced that its advertisement campaign was working, while other food chains in the US still struggled to entice diners into their stores. Store sales increased 14.8 percent in the fiscal fourth quarter for Chili's.

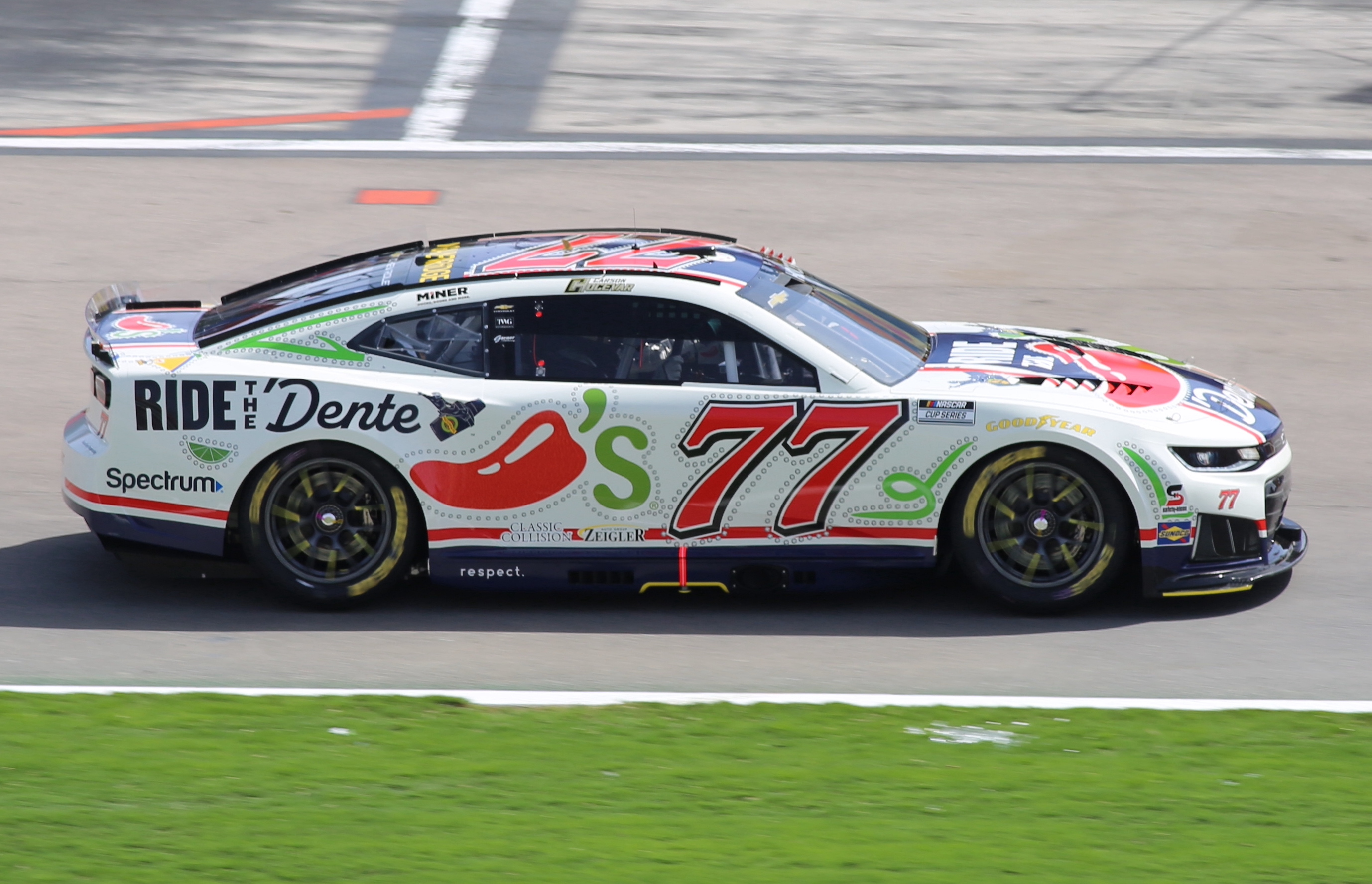
Chili's sponsored NASCAR for Carson Hocevar in 2026

In January 2024, Chili's announced an advertising partnership with Spire Motorsports where they would serve as the title sponsor of the #7 car, driven by Corey Lajoie in the beginning of the season and later Justin Haley for the final few races. This would begin a multi-year partnership with Spire Motorsports, which has extended until this year. As of mid-2026, the Chili's car is currently driven by Carson Hocevar. The driver/sponsorship duo currently have one win, which came at the 2026 Jack Link's 500 at Talladega Superspeedway.

In June 2024, the Chili's restaurant chain obtained the license for BurgerTime to create a browser-based game called Chili’s Big Smasher BurgerTime. In this version of the game, players control the franchise mascot Joe ChiliHead in a quest to create Big Smasher Burgers across six levels of gameplay. Players who participated also had the chance to win prizes such as free burgers for life.

== Locations ==
Chili's operates in the following countries and territories:

- Asia/Oceania: China, Guam, India, Indonesia, Japan (only in U.S military bases), Malaysia, Philippines, South Korea, Sri Lanka, Taiwan
- North America/Caribbean: United States, Canada, Mexico, Dominican Republic, and Puerto Rico
- South America/Central America: Chile, Costa Rica, Ecuador, Guatemala, Honduras, Panama, and Peru
- Middle East: Bahrain, Kuwait, Lebanon, Oman, Qatar, Saudi Arabia, and the United Arab Emirates
- Europe: Germany (only in U.S military bases), Romania
- Africa: Egypt, Morocco, Tunisia
Gallery
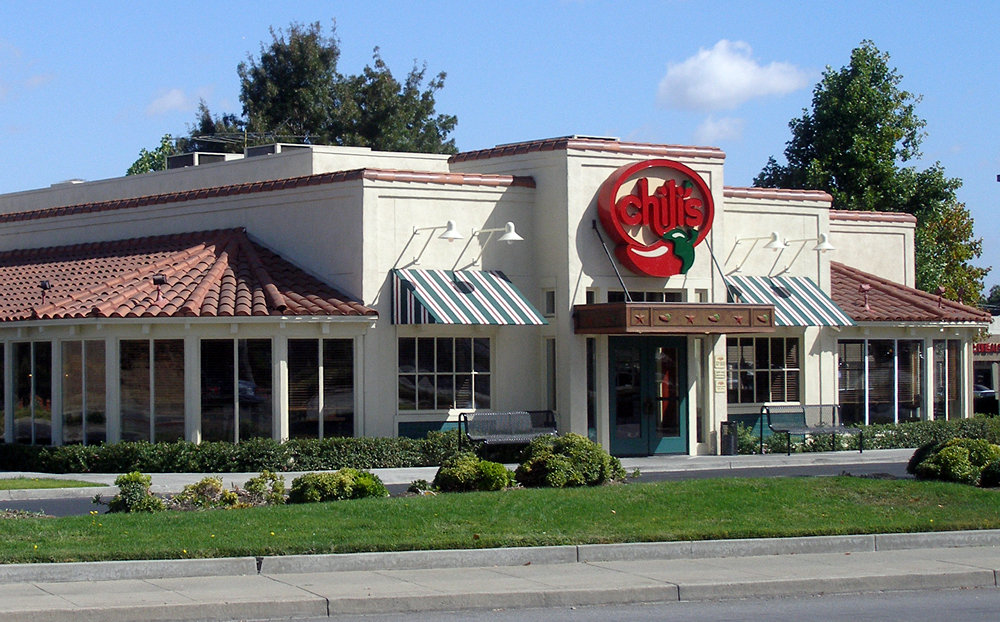
Chili's in Santa Clara, California

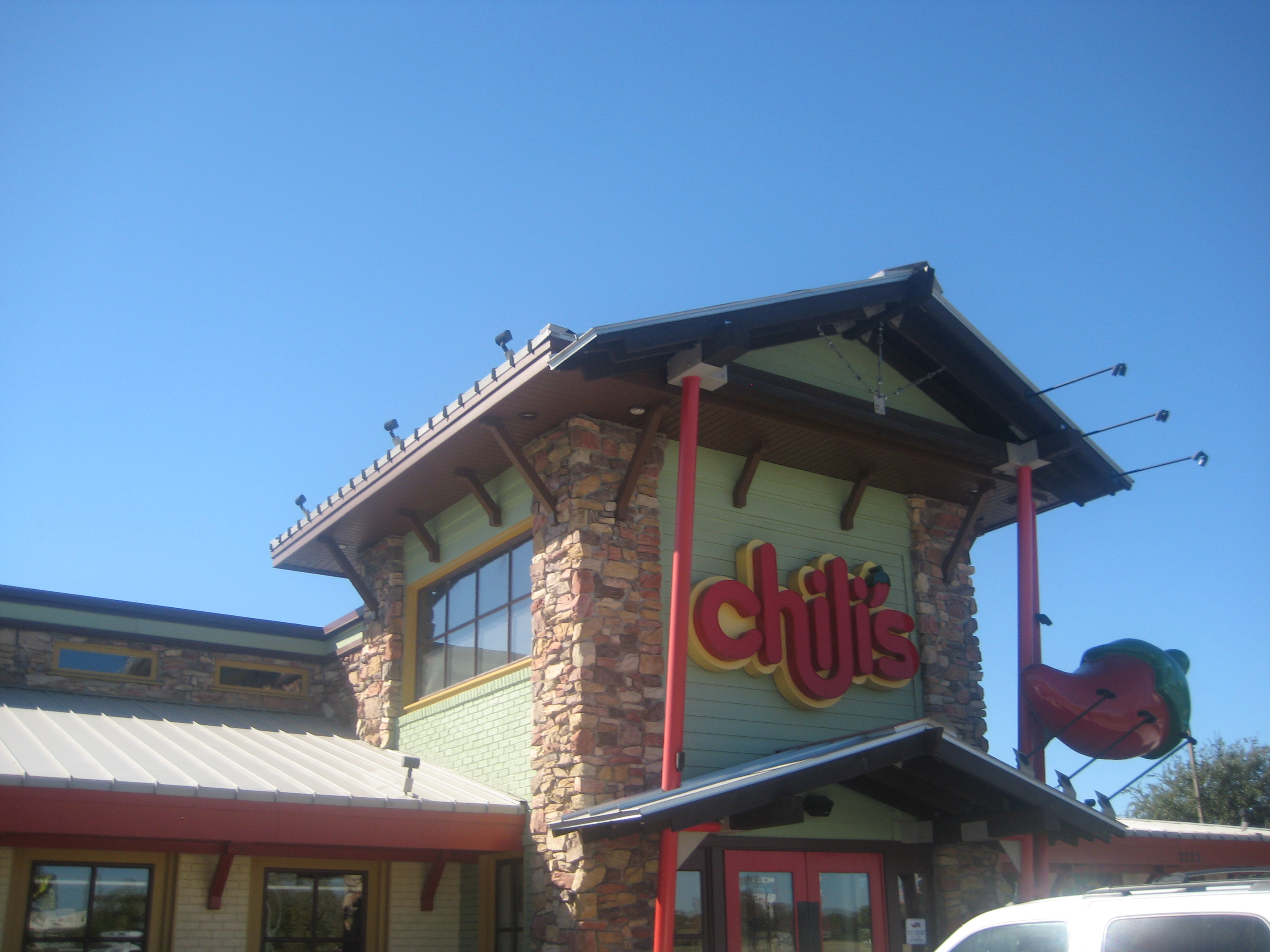
Chili's in Dallas, Texas

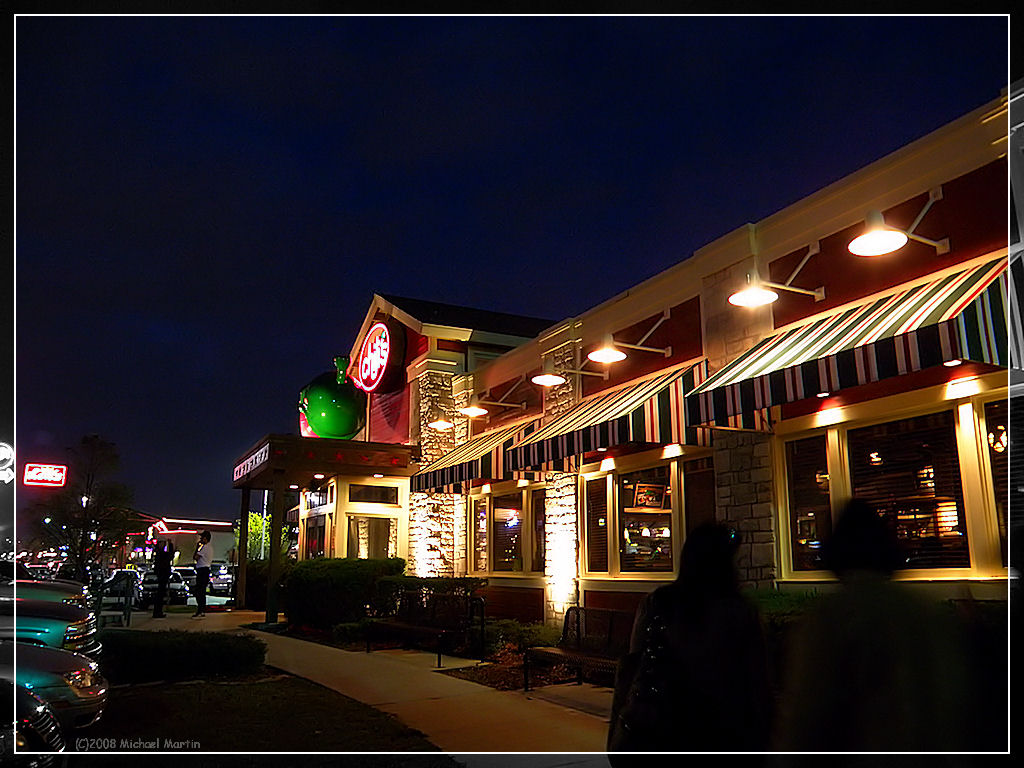
Chili's in Brownsville, Texas

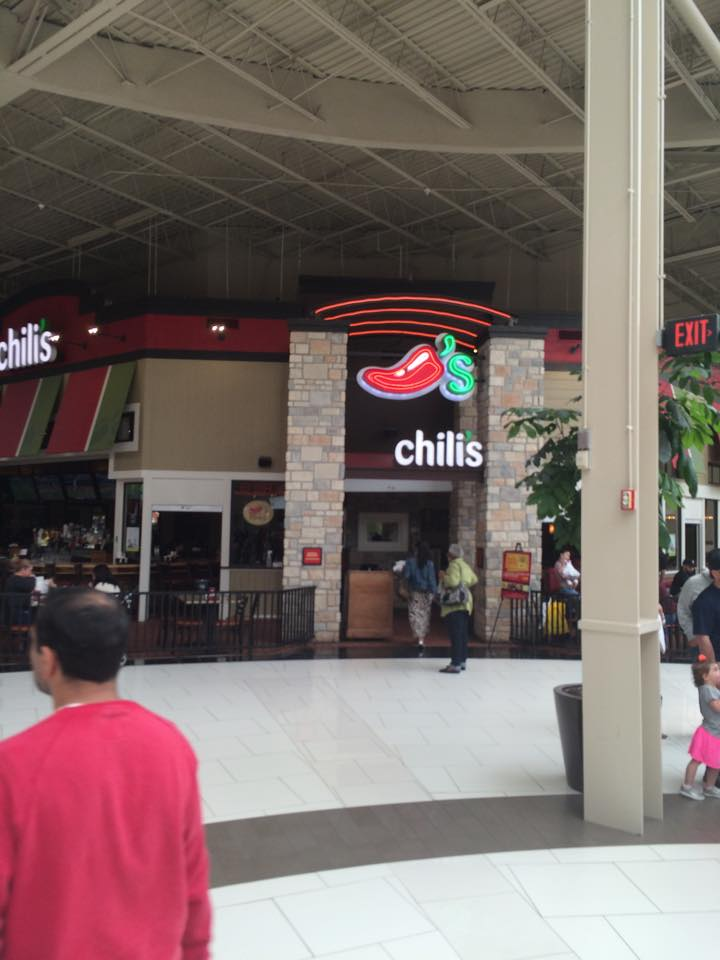
Chili's at Palisades Center shopping mall, West Nyack, New York

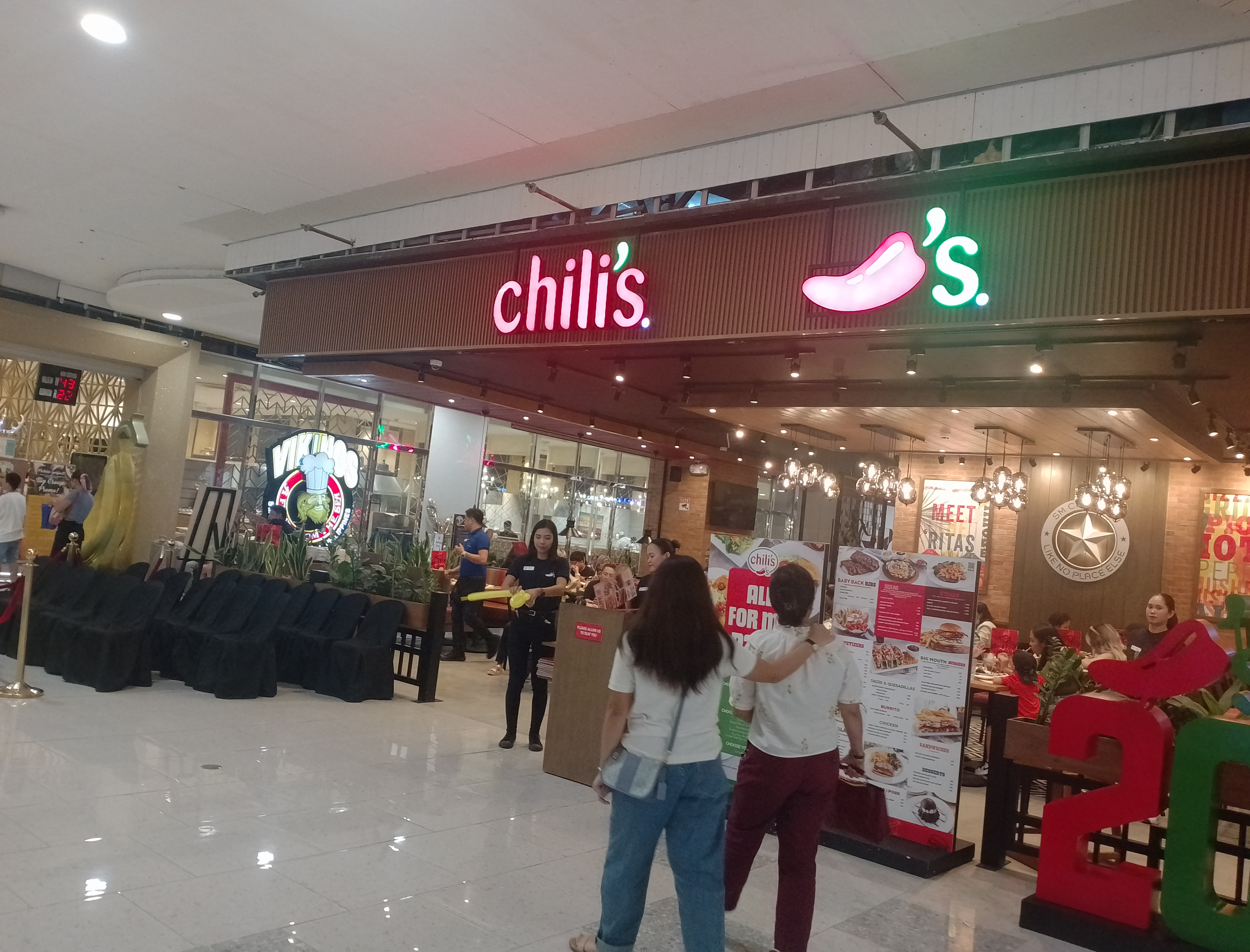
Chili's in Cebu City, Philippines

The Chilis Presidente Margarita, the signature alcoholic drink of the restaurant.

== Legal problems ==
In October 2008, a Chili's Australia franchise was prosecuted and fined A$300,000 (equivalent to $416,240 in 2022) by the NSW Office of Industrial Relations for underpaying staff, pressuring employees to sign an Australian workplace agreement, and failing to pay A$45,000 (equivalent to $62,436 in 2022) in owed wages by a deadline set by the Office of Industrial Relations. In the same year, Chili's announced the permanent closure of all its Australian locations due to poor sales, unprofitability, and non-compliance with the Fair Work Act 2009.

In July 2024, American rap rock group the Beastie Boys filed a lawsuit against Chili's parent company Brinker International for copyright infringement, claiming that the group's 1994 song "Sabotage" has been illegally used to promote Chili's in advertisements on social media starting around November 2022.

In March 2026, a Chilli’s in Rosemont Illinois was sued for firing an assistant manager for their transgender identity. The plaintiff proclaimed that this is a violation of Illinois state law, as transgender people are defined as a protected class.

== Controversies ==
- 2008: On June 5, a woman from Washington named Anne Paskett filed a class-action suit against Brinker International. Paskett and the rest of the plaintiffs claimed that the restaurant chain's so-called healthier offerings, like the Chili's "Guiltless Black Bean Burger" have nutritional values much different than the ones listed on the menu. Independent laboratory tests were conducted, discovering that the fat content of the items are sometimes double, or even triple, the amount shown on these menus.
- 2009: Brinker International fired a Chili's employee for the claim of sexual harassment, only to employ her again after the public outrage. They claimed that her termination was a computer error.
- 2018: Brinker International disclosed that its data network had been breached between March and April 2018, exposing the personally identifiable information of its customers. Subsequently, several customers of Chili's filed suit against the company, alleging that its failure to comply with industry standards for information security and implement adequate data security measures to protect its data networks from the potential danger of a data breach had caused them to incur fraudulent charges on their payment cards.
- 2019: Chili's Restaurant was fined after an employee fell into a vat of scalding water.
- 2020: Brinker International and its Chili's subsidiary paid US$150,000 to settle sexual harassment allegations from five female employees.

== In popular culture ==
- Chili's was a key location in The Office season 2 episode 7 "The Client." The episode shows Michael and Jan meeting a client at a local Chili's restaurant after Michael had changed the location of the meeting from Radisson citing Chili's as "the new golf course." It was also featured in another season 2 episode, "The Dundies".
- On April 7, 2025, the chain opened "The Scranton Branch", an Office themed Chili’s based on the one featured in the show. The Scranton restaurant is the only one in the chain to feature the Awesome Blossom, which was removed from the full menu in 2008.
- The Chili's jingle was also used in Austin Powers: The Spy Who Shagged Me where Fat Bastard meets Dr. Evil with the mojo belonging to Austin Powers. When he sees Mini-Me walk out with the money, startling him, he tries to eat him, thinking he is a baby. After attempting to eat Mini-Me, Fat Bastard suggests that Dr. Evil keeps the mojo, and he gets the baby, and then sings the Chili's Babyback Ribs song.
- In Season one of That '90s Show, the recurring character, Fez, mentions Chili's is the location where he and his current lover had met, also making a reference to the Babyback Ribs jingle.
- Chili's was mentioned several times in the 2010 road comedy film Due Date, starring Robert Downey Jr. and Zach Galifianakis.
- On April 5, 2024, in Austin, Texas, the date was declared Chili's at 45th & Lamar Day.
- On July 22, 2025, Austin, Texas-based Tecovas announced a collaboration with Chili's wherein Tecovas would sell boots out of "genuine Chili’s Booths". The boots retailed for $345.
