= Norman E. Brinker =

American restaurateur

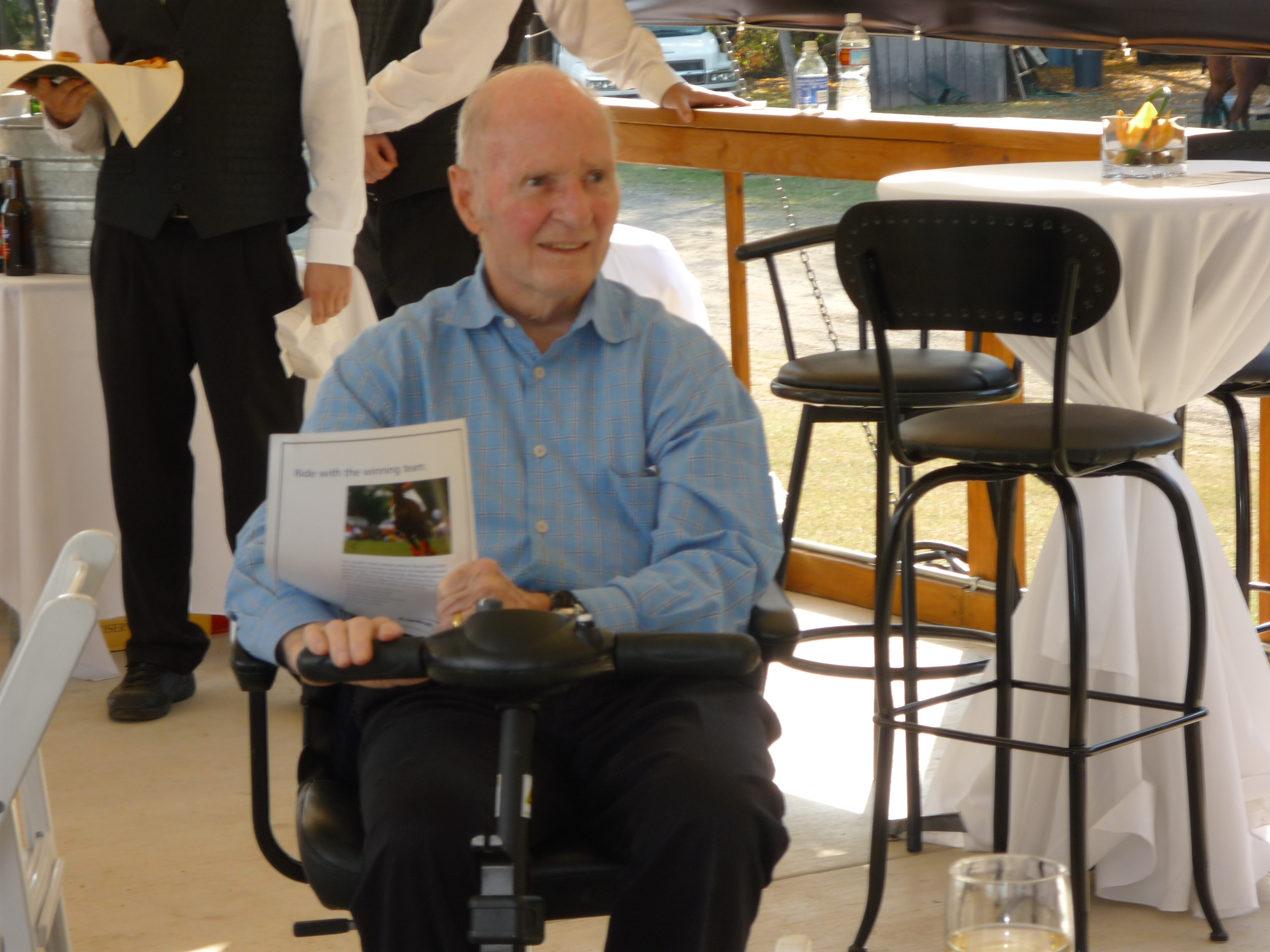
- Brinker in 2008
- Born: Norman Eugene Brinker; June 3, 1931; Denver, Colorado
- Died: June 9, 2009 (aged 78); Colorado Springs, Colorado
- Occupation: Restaurateur
- Spouse(s): Maureen Connolly (1955-1969); Magarit Fendt (1971-1976); Nancy Goodman (1981-2000)
- Children: Brenda, Christina, Cindy, Eric, Mark
- Parent(s): Kathryn and Eugene Brinker

Norman Eugene Brinker (June 3, 1931 – June 9, 2009) was an American restaurateur who was responsible for the creation of new business concepts within the restaurant field. He served as president of Jack in the Box, founded Steak and Ale, helped establish Bennigan's and Chili's, and founded Brinker International.

== Biography ==
Brinker was born on June 3, 1931. He began his career in the 1960s in Southern California with fast-food company Jack in the Box, rising to oversee its expansion into a regional chain in the United States. After leaving the company, he founded several chains, including Steak and Ale. With its sale to Pillsbury in 1976, Brinker rose to new heights, eventually becoming president of the company's entire restaurant operations. At the height of his tenure with Pillsbury, he was responsible for the creation or oversaw the operations of such restaurants as Bennigan's, Burger King, and Häagen-Dazs. When he left Pillsbury in 1984 to purchase a small gourmet burger shop called Chili's, Brinker saw his greatest business success. The company eventually became one of the largest restaurant holding companies in the world with five chains operating 1900 restaurants in 25 countries. Now known as Brinker International, the company currently employs over 100,000 people and has system-wide sales exceeding US$4 billion annually.

During the 1950s, Brinker engaged in a hectic and busy lifestyle. He joined the U.S. Navy in 1952; during his stint in the service, Brinker used his passion and talent for horsemanship to earn a place on the United States Olympic Equestrian team in the 1952 Summer Olympics in Helsinki, Finland, and the 1954 modern pentathlon world championships in Budapest, Hungary. While stationed in San Diego, California, he chose to attend San Diego State College, now San Diego State University. While in college, he met and married Tennis Grand Slam winner and world champion Maureen "Little Mo" Connolly in 1955, became president of his class, and graduated with honors in 1957. His marriage, which produced two children, ended in 1969 when she succumbed to ovarian cancer. His 1971—1976 marriage to Margrit Fendt produced two more children. In 1981, Brinker met and later married his third wife, Nancy Goodman, on February 14, 1983. He was gravely injured in a polo accident in 1993, was chair of the United States Polo Association, inducted into the Museum of Polo and Hall of Fame on March 6, 1998, and retired from Brinker International in 2001. They engaged in many Republican causes and fund-raising missions during their time together. The couple was amicably divorced in 2003. He married his fourth wife, Toni Chapman, in March 2003 and remained with her until his death in 2009.

While Brinker created and donated to numerous charities and foundations over his lifetime, his 20-year marriage to Nancy produced one of the most famous charities of the 20th century. With the memory of his first wife's battle with the disease in the 1960s, the Brinkers used his wealth to establish a fund dedicated to advancing treatment for cancer in the name of Mrs. Brinker's sister who had died of breast cancer in 1980 at the age of 36. The Susan G. Komen Breast Cancer Foundation was established in 1982 and eventually became known as Susan G. Komen for the Cure; it since has become one of the most prominent cancer-related charities in the world. Despite the divorce, Brinker remained with the foundation until the end.

== Professional ==
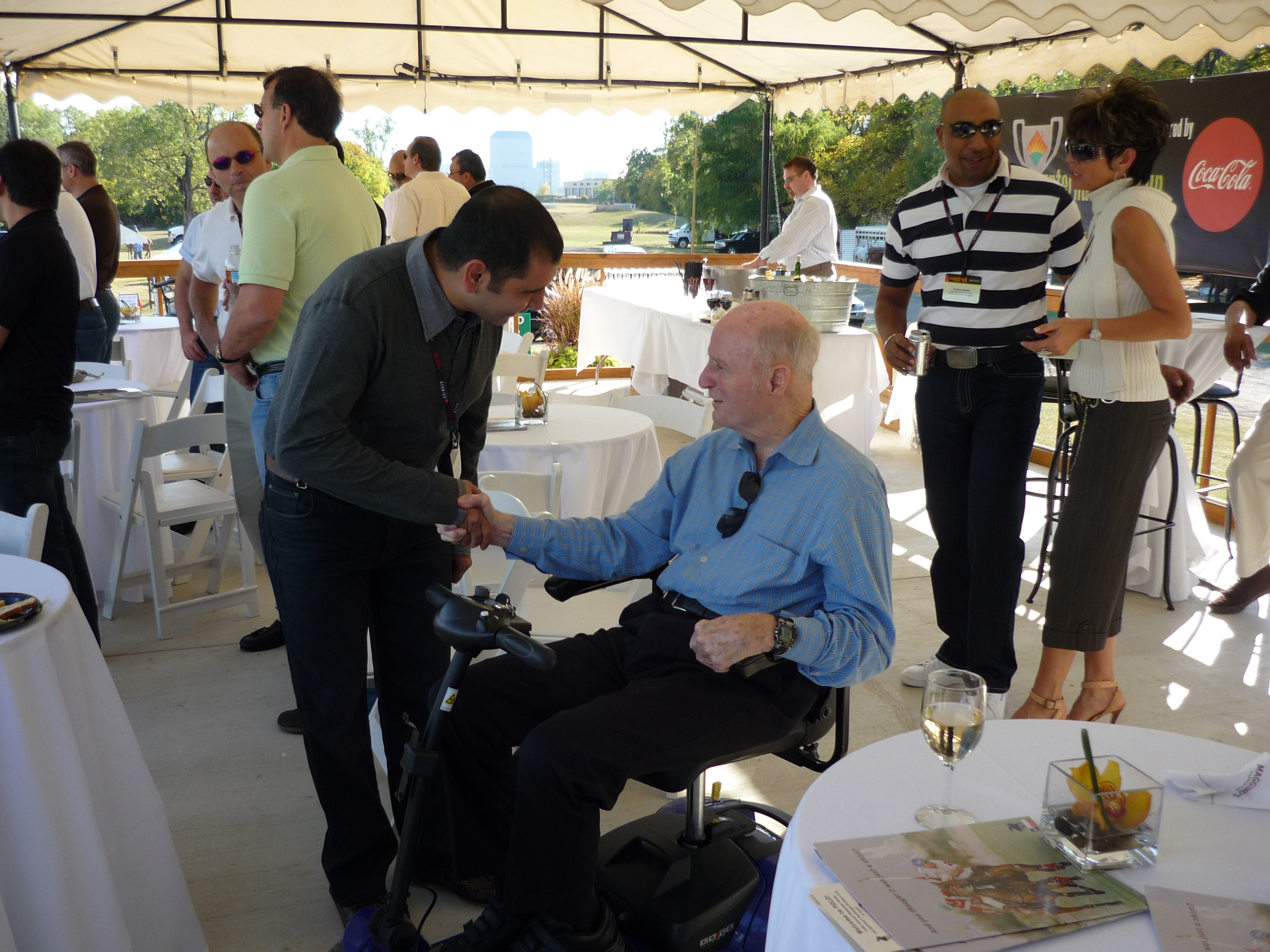
Norman Brinker with Mohamed Abdelnabi, director Of Operation Chili's UAE/OMAN

After Brinker had graduated from college, he took a job with a small chain of diners in San Diego named Oscar's. At the time, Oscar's owner Bob Peterson had also opened a second chain in the area called Jack in the Box; while Brinker succeeded in his position, he was eventually drawn to Peterson's growing fast-food business. At Jack-in-the-Box, Brinker flourished, helping the business expand across the Southwestern United States. Within two years of moving over to the company, he had been elevated to the position of president of the company and amassed a 20% stake in it. Brinker developed a close professional relationship with Peterson, taking many of his business philosophies to heart and developing the food-service philosophy that he attempted to follow throughout his career. Brinker said of Peterson, "Bob Peterson was really my mentor. Everything we do here today started back then. Letting ideas rise from below, treating people right—all of that."

When Jack in the Box went public in the early 1960s, Brinker sold his interest in the company and moved to Dallas with the intent to open a new business. His first endeavor was a coffee shop he named after himself, Brinks. The concept was to create a restaurant that catered to the 25- to 44-year-old demographic, a group that was still in the early stages of developing a taste for inexpensive fast food. The shop proved successful, and he sold it two years later. Using the proceeds from the sale, he opened a new chain in 1966 with the intent of providing an affordable steak dinner to the middle class. He called his new concept Steak and Ale.

With the Steak and Ale chain, Brinker originated the concept of the modern casual dining restaurant that is now ubiquitous in the marketplace. One of the innovations that Brinker introduced with Steak and Ale was the salad bar. Besides the novel concept of having customers leave their tables to serve themselves from a salad buffet, the Dallas-based chain also created the now common stock introduction of "Hi, my name is ______, and I will be your waiter tonight." These ideas were part of an overall plan to establish a restaurant that was more relaxed with a more casual atmosphere. Over the next ten years, he went on to establish a niche industry that was situated between the fast-food and higher-priced gourmet segments of the restaurant field. By 1976, he had taken the chain to 109 restaurants, and had successfully introduced the American consumer to the concept of the chain restaurant. He then sold his company to Pillsbury and assumed a position in the company's restaurant division.

As a part of the acquisition, Brinker was given the position executive vice president of Pillsbury's restaurant operations, as well as a seat on the company's board of directors. During his tenure as executive VP, Brinker oversaw the creation of the company's Bennigan's chain. Bennigan's was the first in a new concept of restaurants intended to attract single people, a concept that became known as the "fern bar". As his status in Pillsbury grew, Brinker was asked to take over the operations of its main fast-food chain, Burger King.

By the early 1980s, Burger King's sales had begun to fade. Brinker was asked to turn the brand around and strengthen its position against its main rival, McDonald's. One of his first acts was to initiate an advertising plan emphasizing claims that Burger King's flame-broiled burgers were better and larger than its rival's. The program, arguably the first attack ads on a food chain by a competitor, was controversial in that before it fast-food ads only made allusions to the competition in a vague manner, never mentioning them by name. McDonald's sued Burger King and their ad agency at the time, the J. Walter Thompson Company. Child actress Sarah Michelle Gellar was also implicated in the lawsuit because of her appearance in these television commercials. The suit was settled the following year on undisclosed terms. Despite the controversy, the ad plan boosted same-store sales when sales took off. The whole situation at the time became known as the Burger Wars.

He worked for the company in this capacity until 1982, when he was promoted to president of Pillsbury's food-service division. His new role expanded his oversight to include the company's other chains, including Burger King, Quik-Wok, and Poppin' Fresh. However his new position was short lived, as he left the company in 1984 to take over a small, Dallas-based gourmet burger chain called Chili's.

=== Industry impact ===
Beyond launching several restaurant chains and the creation of one of the most widely emulated restaurant formats used in the market today, Brinker had another, indirect impact on the food-service industry. Over his nearly 50-year career, he worked with, hired or trained many executives who have gone on to establish themselves within the modern restaurant industry in the United States and Canada. Many of these individuals started with him either at his Steak and Ale chain beginning or met him during the establishment of Bennigan's in the 1970s. Others were with him during the time as president of Pillsbury's restaurants division or came up through the Chili's system under his watch.

Some of the people who have worked with Brinker have gone on to oversee competing chains, such as Applebee's and T.G.I. Fridays. The vice president of OSI Restaurant Partners of Tampa, Florida, Joseph L. Jackson, began his career as a general manager of Steak and Ale who made a favorable impression with Brinker during his time with the company. Other restaurant chains and food service companies that Brinker directly or indirectly influenced include Boston Market, Flying J, Lettuce Entertain You, Sizzler, and many others. Outside of the restaurant business, former colleagues have taken the lessons they learned from him and gone into such divergent fields as human resources management, corporate and private investigations, and market research services using such programs as customer satisfaction surveys and mystery shopping.

Nations Restaurant News has an award that honors Brinker. The Norman Award recognizes industry executives annually, who have inspired future leaders and has had "a significant impact" in their industry.

== Personal life ==
Brinker was born on June 3, 1931, in Denver, Colorado, as an only child. His parents, Kathryn and Eugene Brinker, later moved to a 10-acre (40,000 m^{2}) farm in Roswell, New Mexico. As a child, Norman took on odd jobs to supplement the family's modest income, creating a rabbit farm at the age of 10, managing a "120-mile-long" paper route and buying and selling horses to help make ends meet for the family. He attended Roswell High School and proceeded to attend the New Mexico Military Institute. He later served in the Navy, which brought him to San Diego, California. He later attended San Diego State College and graduated in 1957 at the age of 26. An avid and talented polo enthusiast, in 1952, Brinker was a member of the Olympic Equestrian team, competing in the 1952 Summer Olympics in Helsinki, Finland, and later competed in the 1954 pentathlon competition at the world championships in Budapest.

In June 1955, Brinker married tennis player Maureen "Little Mo" Connolly. The couple shared a passion for horses. Her professional tennis career ended due to a freak accident on a horse at the age of 18. They had two daughters, Cindy Brinker (Simmons), who was born in 1957, and Brenda Brinker (Bottum), who was born in 1959. Maureen died at the age of 34 on June 21, 1969, after a three-year-long battle with ovarian cancer. The relationship between Norman and Maureen Brinker was depicted in a 1978 telefilm, Little Mo, which starred Glynnis O'Connor as Maureen, Mark Harmon as Norman, and Anne Baxter as Maureen's mother.

Brinker married his second wife, Magrit L. Fendt, on March 7, 1971. Over the next five years, the couple had two children: Christina and Mark. The couple divorced in 1976.

On February 14, 1981, Brinker married a third time, to Nancy Goodman, the former wife of Neiman Marcus executive Robert Leitstein. Goodman's son with Leitstein, Eric Blake Leitstein, took Brinker's surname after the marriage. The marriage provided Nancy with funding and an immediate network of financial and political support for the foundation dedicated to the memory of Nancy's sister, Susan G. Komen, which became the Susan G. Komen for the Cure and related Komen Race for the Cure. The couple were active Bush Pioneers, wealthy donors who provided $100,000 or more of financial support for George W. Bush's presidential ambitions.

On January 22, 1993, Brinker was seriously injured during a polo match in a high-speed collision with another rider at the West Palm Beach Polo and Hunt Club in West Palm Beach, Florida. Suffering serious head injuries and in what was anticipated to be a prolonged coma, three days after the accident, Brinker was succeeded by Ron A. McDougall as chief executive officer of Brinker International; despite his retirement, Brinker retained the title of chairman emeritus. Some years after the accident, Norman and Nancy Brinker had an amicable divorce after 20 years of marriage and Nancy moved on to serve as the U.S. ambassador to Hungary early in the George W. Bush administration from 2001 to 2003. Norman Brinker remained a close advisor to Nancy Brinker in the years following their divorce.

Brinker died on June 9, 2009, from aspiration pneumonia while on vacation in Colorado, six days after his 78th birthday.

== Publications ==
- Brinker, Norman Donald T. Phillips, On the Brink: The Life and Leadership of Norman Brinker Summit Publishing Group, 1996, 203 pages, ISBN 1-56530-212-5
