= Bennigan's =

American restaurant chain

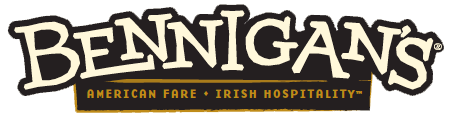
- Bennigan's current logo
- Company type: Privately-held company
- Industry: Restaurant Franchising
- Founded: 1976; 50 years ago
- Headquarters: Dallas, Texas, U.S.
- Key people: Paul Mangiamele (CEO)
- Owner: Legendary Restaurant Brands, LLC (Paul Mangiamele)
- Website: bennigans.com

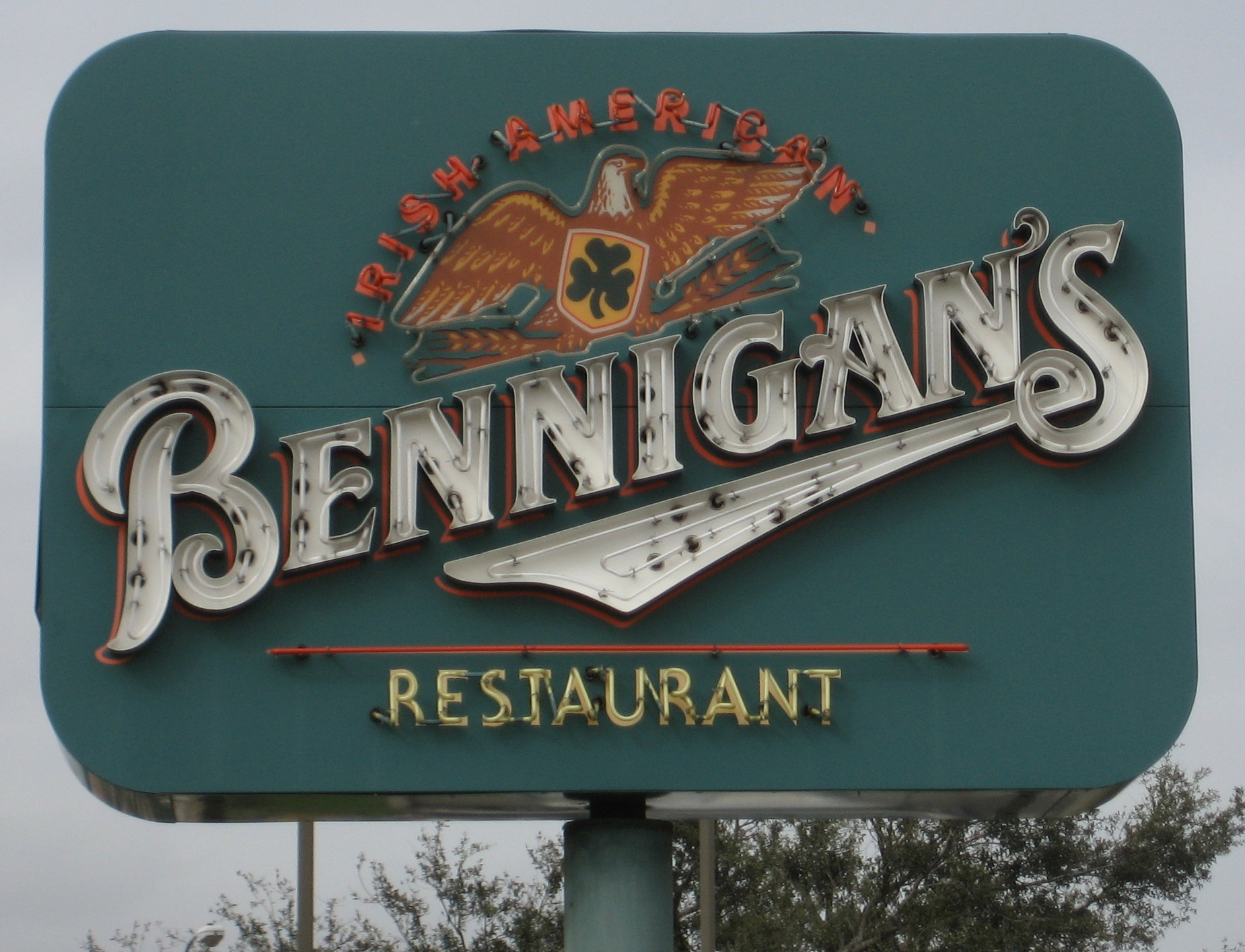
A Bennigan's sign featuring the old logo, before the brand revamp.

Bennigan's, headquartered in Dallas, Texas, is an Irish pub-themed casual dining restaurant chain. It was founded in 1976 in Atlanta, Georgia, by restaurateur Norman E. Brinker as one of America's original casual dining concepts. It was notable for its Monte Cristo sandwich, which included several meats batter-dipped, fried, and coated with powdered sugar.

The chain was managed by the restaurant division of Pillsbury until Pillsbury was acquired by Grand Metropolitan in 1989. Due to laws preventing liquor manufacturers from also operating liquor sellers, the chain was sold to Metromedia. At its peak, it had over 300 restaurants, but failure to update, grow, and differentiate the brand, degrading quality, and shifting consumer preferences, led to a fall of sales. It filed for Chapter 7 bankruptcy in 2008 and closed most of its restaurants. It was then acquired by a private equity company. It was acquired by CEO Paul Mangiamele in 2015.

Bennigan's currently operates 21 brick-and-mortar locations and 21 delivery-only "Bennigan's On The Fly" concepts.

== History ==
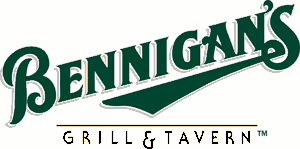
Bennigan's old logo from the 1990s.

Bennigan's Restaurant in 2004, Denver, Colorado

Bennigan's was established in 1976 in Atlanta, Georgia, as a division of Pillsbury by company vice president and Steak and Ale founder Norman E. Brinker. The first significant Bennigan's location opened in Tysons Corner, Virginia, the following year.

In 1983, Brinker led an exodus of senior management from the Steak and Ale and Bennigan's division, purchasing Chili's, a regional restaurant that focused on gourmet hamburgers.

In 1989, Pillsbury was acquired by Grand Metropolitan, a major liquor distributor bound by "three-tier" laws that prohibited liquor distributors from owning liquor retailers. Metromedia then acquired Bennigan's and Steak and Ale.

=== Decline ===
At its peak, it had over 300 restaurants, but failure to update, grow, and differentiate the brand, degrading quality, and shifting consumer preferences, led to a fall of sales.

In May 2006, Bennigan's closed all of its restaurants in New York and Connecticut.

In July 2008, the franchisor and owner of corporate locations filed for Chapter 7 bankruptcy protection and closed all of Bennigan's 150 corporate locations in the U.S.

Initially the firm's 138 franchisee-owned locations remained open, but many closed within the next several years. In South Korea, over 30 locations still operated as usual until they were closed in January 2016.

=== New ownership ===
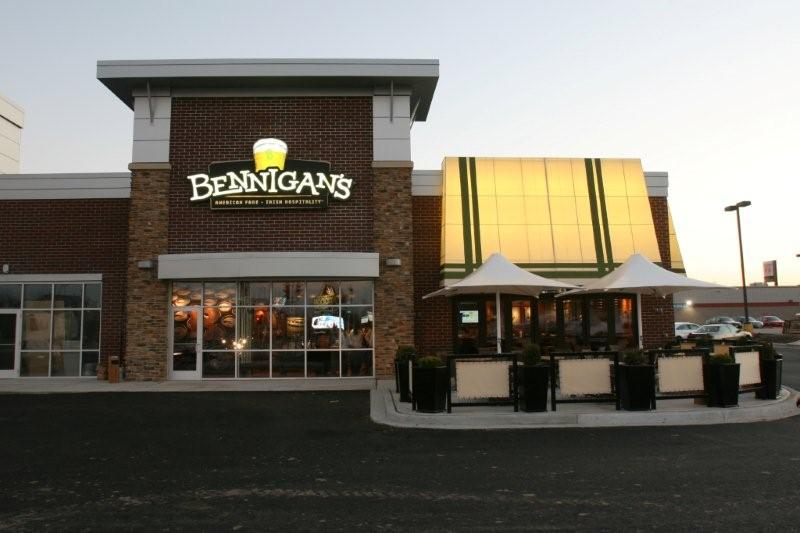
Bennigan's new prototype

In October 2008, Atalaya Capital Management acquired the Bennigan's and Steak and Ale brands and the franchisor, with plans to reopen corporate locations as franchises.

In May 2012, management announced plans for a new logo, store prototype, franchise models, menu, and the addition of catering. New restaurants are smaller, with a contemporary design, yet have Bennigan's nostalgia.

In February 2015, CEO Paul Mangiamele and his wife, Gwen, acquired the company for an undisclosed price via Legendary Restaurant Brands, LLC.

In 2018 and 2019, the company announced plans for over 100 units in development, including international locations in Amsterdam, Honduras, Guatemala, El Salvador, and Pakistan.

In 2021, the company licensed its "On The Fly" brand to hotels as virtual restaurants.

== In popular culture ==
- Bennigan's is featured in several scenes of the film About Fate (2022)
- The film Waiting was inspired by director Rob McKittrick's experiences working at Bennigan's and Steak and Ale.
- The restaurant is referenced multiple times in the animated series South Park:
  - In the episode "Butters' Very Own Episode" (2001), Butters repeatedly expresses excitement about celebrating his parents' anniversary at Bennigan’s.
  - In "Canada on Strike" (2008), Canada ends a strike in exchange for coupons to Bennigan’s and bubble gum.
- In The Muppets Mayhem (2023) Floyd becomes a commercial jingle writer and is surprised to hear that Bennigan’s is back, after saying last he heard it went out of business in 2008.

== See also ==
- List of Irish restaurants
