= Brinker International =

American restaurant company

Brinker International, Inc.
- Type: Public
- Traded as: NYSE: EAT; S&P 400 component
- Industry: Restaurant
- Predecessor: Chili's Grill & Bar; (1975-76); Chili's, Inc.; (1976-91)
- Founded: 1991; 35 years ago
- Founder: Larry Lavine; (Chili's Grill & Bar); Norman E. Brinker; (Brinker International, Inc.)
- Headquarters: Dallas, Texas, U.S.
- Number of locations: 1,672 restaurants (2019)
- Area served: Worldwide
- Key people: Kevin Hochman (president and CEO)
- Services: Foodservice
- Revenue: ▲US$2.905 billion (2015)
- Operating income: ▲US$311.20 million (2015)
- Net income: ▲US$196.69 million (2015)
- Total assets: ▲US$2.688 billion (2020)
- Total equity: ▼US$–78.46 million (2015)
- Number of employees: 62,200 (2020)
- Subsidiaries: Chili's; Pomona's Pingu Fries; Maggiano's Little Italy
- Website: brinker.com

Brinker International, Inc. (or simply Brinker) is an American multinational hospitality industry company that owns Chili's and Maggiano's Little Italy restaurant chains. Founded in 1975 and based in Dallas, Texas, Brinker currently owns, operates, or franchises 1,672 restaurants under the names Chili's Grill & Bar and Maggiano's Little Italy worldwide.

== History ==
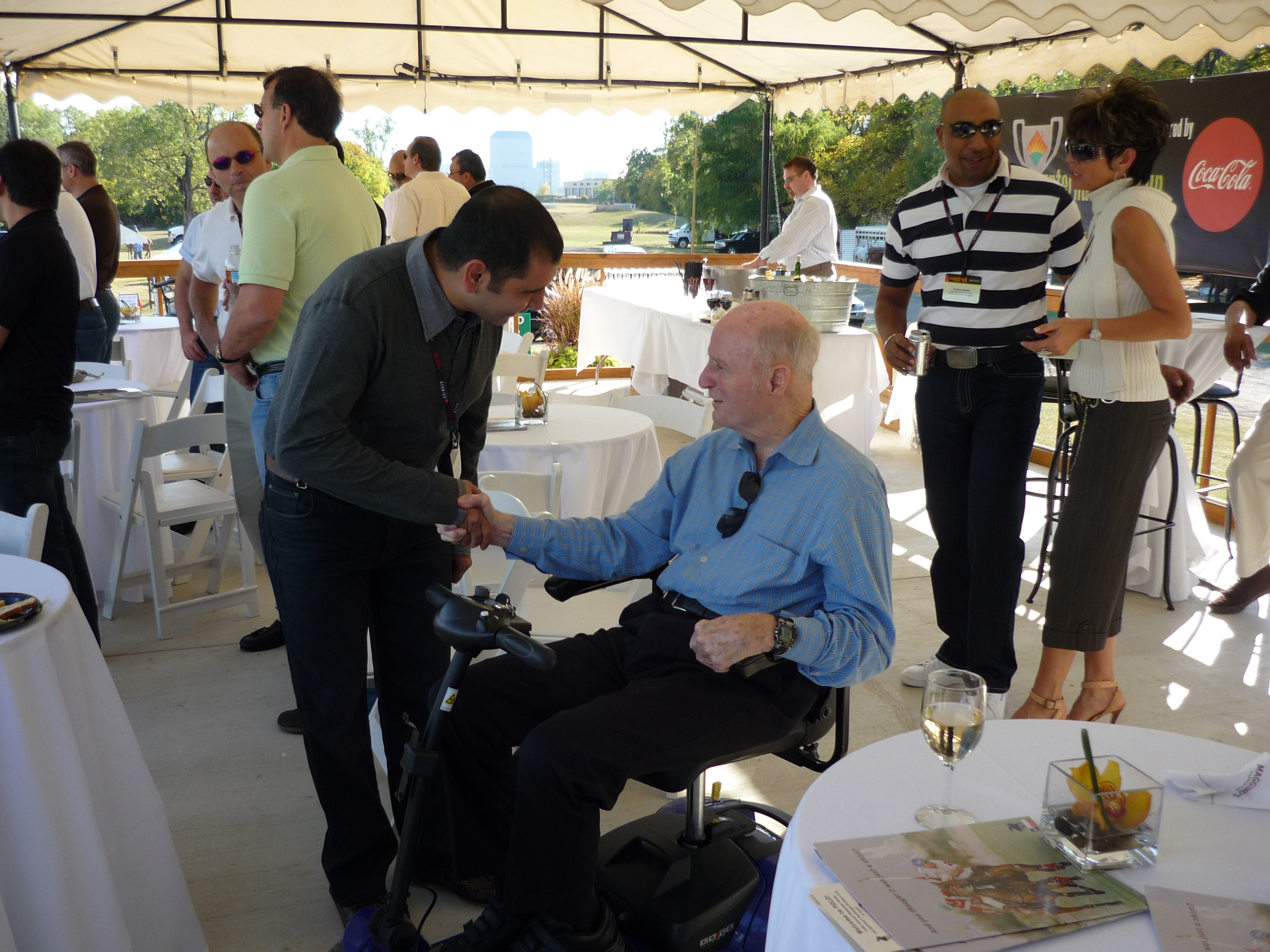
Norman Brinker with Mohamed Abdelnabi Director Of Operation Chili's UAE/OMAN

Larry Lavine opened the first Chili's Grill & Bar in Dallas, Texas. The company was renamed Chili's Inc. in 1976.

Chili's Inc. was sold to Norman E. Brinker in 1983, and took the company public a year later. The first Romano's Macaroni Grill opened in Leon Springs, Texas, in 1988.

In 1991, Chili's Inc. became Brinker International, Inc. In 1992, the company entered into an agreement with Pac-Am Food Concepts to expand the Chili's brand to the Far East.

In 2000, Norman Brinker stepped down as company chairman; he died in June 2009.

In November 2012, Brinker announced the election of Wyman Roberts as CEO and President of Brinker International, and President of Chili's Grill & Bar, effective January 1, 2013. He served in this role until his retirement in June 2022 and was succeeded by Kevin Hochman. Roberts' Brinker tenure includes his role as President of Chili's since 2009. Previously, Roberts also served as Brinker's Chief Marketing Officer and President of the Maggiano's Little Italy brand.

In May 2022, Brinker International announced it joined the National Restaurant Association Educational Foundation (NRAED)’s SkillBridge program. The program, in partnership with the Department of Defense, “helps transitioning service members prepare for a Department of Labor-approved restaurant management apprenticeship program.”

In June 2024, CFO Joe Taylor retired and was succeeded by Mika Ware.

== Acquisitions & sales ==
Brinker acquired Maggiano's from Lettuce Entertain You Enterprises in August 1995.

The company sold off the Corner Bakery Cafe brand in 2005.

In December 2008, Mac Acquisition LLC, an affiliate of Golden Gate Capital, purchased a majority interest in Romano's Macaroni Grill for $131.5 million.

In June 2010, Brinker sold On the Border Mexican Grill & Cantina to OTB Acquisition LLC, also an affiliate of Golden Gate Capital.

In 2015, the company purchased 103 franchised Chili’s restaurants for a reported $106.5 million. In 2019, Brinker acquired 116 Midwestern Chili's restaurants and purchased 23 more in 2021.

== Lawsuits ==
In 2004, a lawsuit was filed against Brinker Restaurant Corp, a subsidiary of Brinker International, alleging the company violated laws governing meal breaks by failing to provide meal and rest periods to its employees. In 2006, the case was certified a class action lawsuit.

An appeal was filed by Brinker in 2008, and the case made its way to the California Supreme Court in 2012. It was ruled that California employers are required to provide uninterrupted 30-minute meal breaks, but are not obligated to ensure that no work is being done during those breaks. In 2014, the case was resolved for a settlement payment of $56.5 million.

In July 2024, American rap rock group the Beastie Boys filed a lawsuit against Brinker International for copyright infringement, claiming that the group's 1994 song "Sabotage" had been illegally used to promote the restaurant chain Chili's, which is owned by Brinker, in advertisements on social media starting around November 2022.

== See also ==
- Bloomin' Brands
- Darden Restaurants
- Dine Brands
