= Dave Deno =

American businessman (born 1956/57)

Dave Deno, as shown by Tampa Bay Chamber of Commerce

Dave Deno (b. 1956 or 1957) is an American businessman, and the CEO of Cracker Barrel. He formerly was COO of Yum! Brands, Inc. and president of Quiznos. He was appointed as CEO of Bloomin' Brands and a member of its board of directors in April 2019 after having been the company's CFO and CAO since November 2013. After five years, he retired in May 2024, although he is a director in Krispy Kreme, Inc. as of June 2024, a position he has held since 2016.

Joining Bloomin' Brands in 2012 and starting a 12-year career there, as its CEO in 2019 to 2024 he was responsible for its portfolio of casual and fine-dining brands, which include Outback Steakhouse, Carrabba's Italian Grill, Bonefish Grill, Fleming's Prime Steakhouse & Wine Bar, and Aussie Grill by Outback. He received a bachelor's degree in economics and political science at Macalester College (for which he would later be chairman) in 1979 and a master's degree in business administration at the University of Michigan in 1982. In 2014, he was interviewed for The Mac Weekly, his alma mater's student periodical. Deno was divorced and has three children. He then remarried in 2013 to Susan Weber, and they currently reside in Tennessee.
