= Tim Gannon =

American businessman and polo player

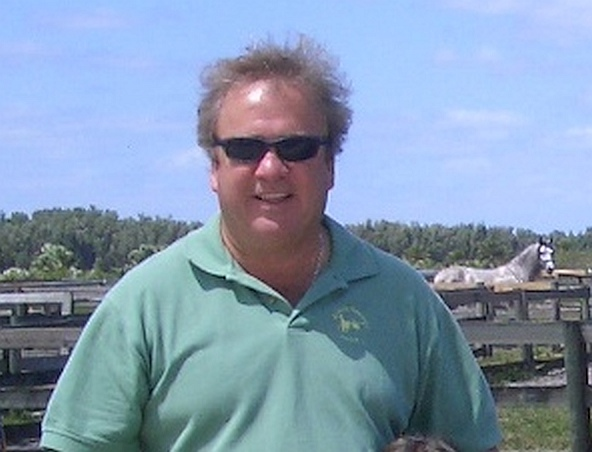
- Born: John Timothy Gannon; United States
- Occupations: Businessman, entrepreneur
- Known for: Co-founder Outback Steakhouse restaurant chain and others
- Notable work: Bloomin' Adventures: The Partners, the Risks, and the Recipe Behind Outback Steakhouse (2026)

John Timothy Gannon is an American businessman and polo player, best known for being one of the founders of the restaurant chain Outback Steakhouse.

== Early life ==
Gannon was raised in Fort Lauderdale, Florida in a middle-class family. Gannon graduated from Florida State University with a degree in Art History.

== Career ==
=== Early career ===
After graduating from Florida State University, Gannon traveled to Florence, Italy, where he worked as a tour guide and lecturer at art galleries while studying art history. He subsequently worked as a cook in Aspen, Colorado, before pursuing a career in the restaurant industry.

Gannon joined Steak & Ale under founder Norman Brinker, where he met future Outback Steakhouse co-founder Chris Sullivan. He spent a decade in New Orleans, working five years at Steak & Ale and five years with Al Copeland developing the Copeland's Cajun restaurant concept, building his expertise in bold flavors and spices. From 1984 to 1987, he served as Vice President and Director of Development of Al Copeland Enterprises.

=== Outback Steakhouse ===
In 1988, Gannon co-founded Outback Steakhouse in Tampa, Florida, where he developed the Bloomin' Onion, the chain's signature appetizer, which has generated over $1 billion in worldwide sales. In 2006, he helped create OSI Restaurant Partners, which operates Outback Steakhouse, Carrabba's Italian Grill, Bonefish Grill, Roy's Restaurant and Fleming's Prime Steakhouse & Wine Bar. Gannon left Outback Steakhouse in 2012.

=== Later career ===
Following his departure from Outback, Gannon became a franchise partner in PDQ, a fast-casual chicken concept founded by fellow Outback co-founder Bob Basham. In 2016, Gannon and his son Chris co-founded Bolay, a health-focused fast-casual restaurant concept in Wellington, Florida, featuring customizable high-protein bowls. In 2026, Gannon co-authored Bloomin' Adventures: The Partners, the Risks, and the Recipe Behind Outback Steakhouse with sports journalist Don Yaeger, a memoir recounting his experience co-founding Outback Steakhouse.

=== Awards and recognition ===
In 1994, Inc. named him Entrepreneur of the Year. He is the recipient of the Florida Restaurant Association's Lifetime Achievement Award and an honorary doctorate from Johnson & Wales University. He was inducted into the Tampa Bay Chamber of Commerce Business Hall of Fame. In 2009, Gannon was inducted into the U.S. Business Hall of Fame alongside Outback co-founders Chris Sullivan and Bob Basham.

== Personal life ==
Gannon is the youngest of six children and has five children of his own.

== Polo ==
Gannon sponsors the Outback Polo Team. He has won five U.S. Open Polo Championships, in 1995 (with Julio Arellano, Sebastian Merlos and Guillermo Gracida, Jr.), 1996 (with Valerio Aguilar, Mike Azzaro, Jeff Blake and Guillermo Gracida, Jr.), 1999 (with Jeff Blake, Adolfo Cambiaso and Lolo Castagnola), 2000, and 2001 (with Adolfo Cambiaso, Fabio Diniz and Santiago Chavanne). In 2013, he was inducted into the Museum of Polo and Hall of Fame in Lake Worth, Florida.

His son, Chris Gannon, is also a polo player.

== Television ==
Year	Title	Role	Notes
2012	The Great Food Truck Race	Himself — Guest Judge	Season 3, Episode 6: "Mistake by the Lake?"; challenged teams to create appetizers inspired by the Bloomin' Onion
2013	Steve Harvey	Himself	Discussed founding of Outback Steakhouse and polo career

== Bibliography ==
- Bloomin' Adventures: The Partners, the Risks, and the Recipe Behind Outback Steakhouse. Gannon Press. 2026. ISBN 979-8-9949363-2-0.
