= Fashion Island =

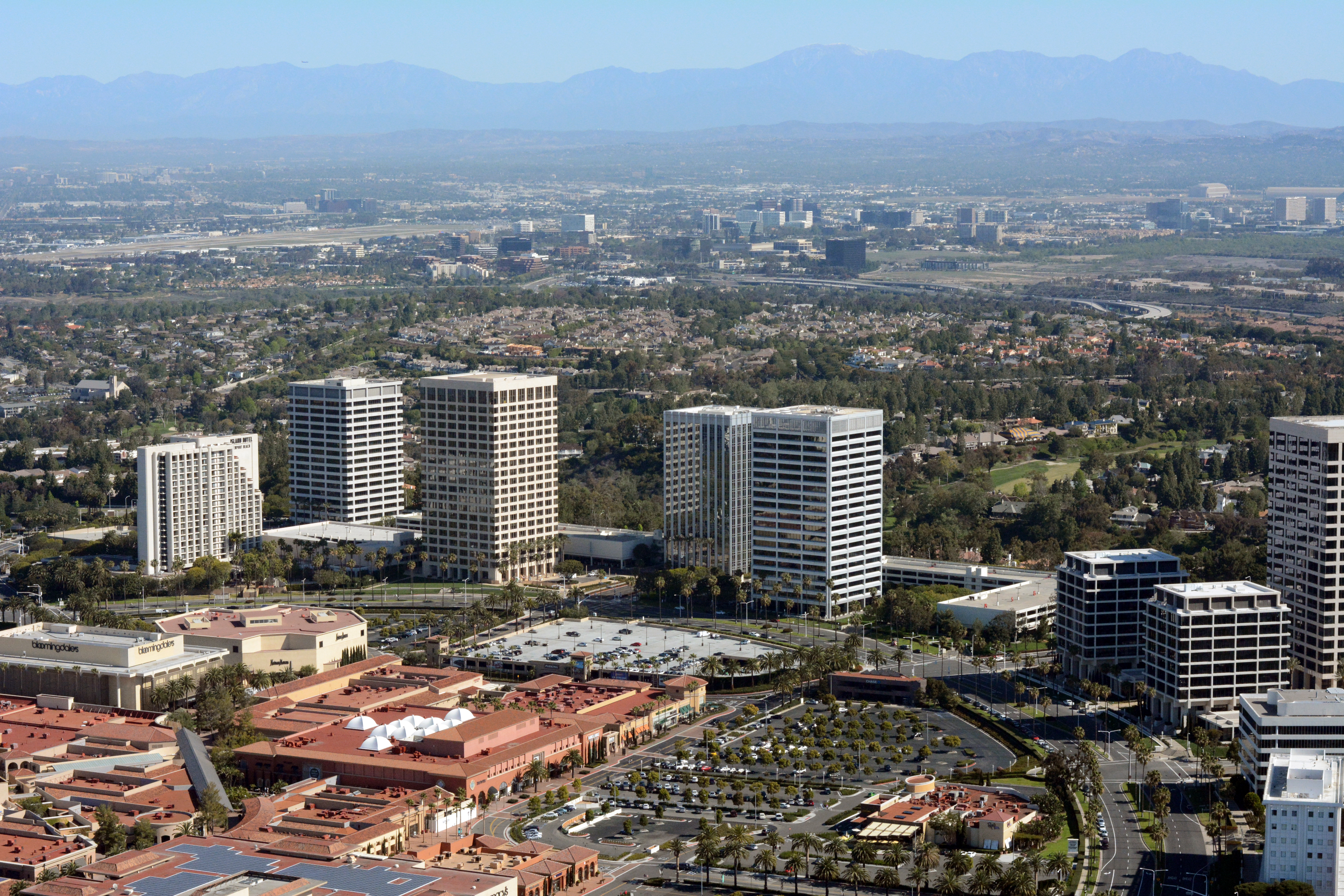
- Fashion Island Mall
- Location: Newport Beach, California, U.S.
- Coordinates: 33°36′57.3″N 117°52′34.1″W
- Address: 401 Newport Center Drive
- Opened: September 9, 1967; 59 years ago
- Developer: The Irvine Company
- Manager: Irvine Management Company
- Owner: The Irvine Company
- Architect: William Pereira (1967); Welton Becket (1967); Jon Jerde (1988)
- Num. of stores: 180
- Num. of anchor tenants: 4
- Floors: 3
- Website: shopfashionisland.com

Fashion Island is an outdoor regional shopping mall in Newport Beach, California. Opened in 1967 by the Irvine Company as the anchor to their master-planned Newport Center district, Fashion Island is anchored by Bloomingdale's, Macy's, Neiman Marcus, and Nordstrom.

== Early history ==
The $20 million, million-square-foot, 75 acres (30 ha) Fashion Island shopping center opened on September 9, 1967, with parking spaces for 5,500 cars. It was built in the same year as the Segerstrom family's nearby South Coast Plaza in Costa Mesa. At its launch, it featured 52 mall stores plus four anchor department stores:

- Buffums, 54,000 sq ft (5,000 m^{2}), designed by Welton Becket and Associates
- Robinson's, 225,000 sq ft (20,900 m^{2}), designed by Gin Wong and William Pereira
- The Broadway, 165,000 sq ft (15,300 m^{2}), designed by Charles Luckman
- JCPenney, 205,000 sq ft (19,000 m^{2}), also designed by Luckman

The overall shopping center, mall shops, and Buffums were designed by Welton Becket and Associates with only a trace of the Spanish architectural theme that later defined the property. However, one early feature of the property—a landmark koi pond constructed in 1968—remains used to this day. Later additions to Fashion Island's anchor roster included Bullocks Wilshire, which opened in August 1977, and Neiman Marcus, which opened in March 1978.

== 1980s ==
The first major change at the shopping center occurred in April 1982, when JCPenney shut its doors. The building JCPenney occupied was redeveloped into a new, enclosed shopping area dubbed the Atrium Court, which featured a basement-level food court and two levels of shops above. An El Torito Grill, the first in the company, opened in a stand-alone building adjacent to Bullock's in 1986.

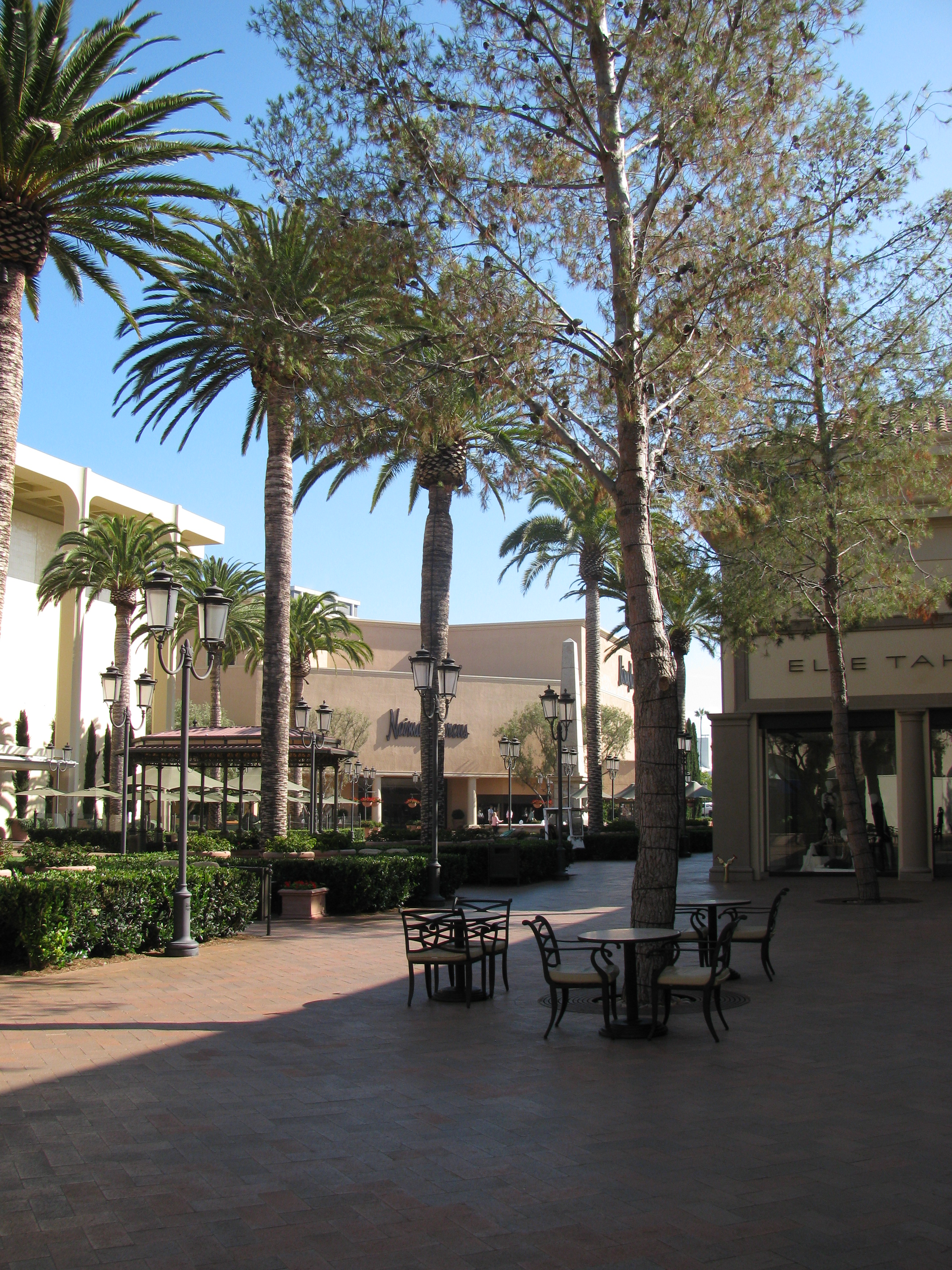
Fashion Island shopping area

In 1989, the center underwent a major expansion and renovation based on the design of architect Jon Jerde, adding the Island Terrace—a second food court and a seven-screen Edwards Theatres cinema - along with a dramatic restructuring of the existing center. A large portion of the property between The Broadway and Bullocks Wilshire was redeveloped into a series of pedestrian avenues radiating from a new circular courtyard with the "Iris fountain", an animated fountain created by WET Design.

== 1990 to 2010 ==
The 1990s and early 2000s brought about major consolidation and change in the department store industry of Southern California and beyond, significantly affecting Fashion Island.

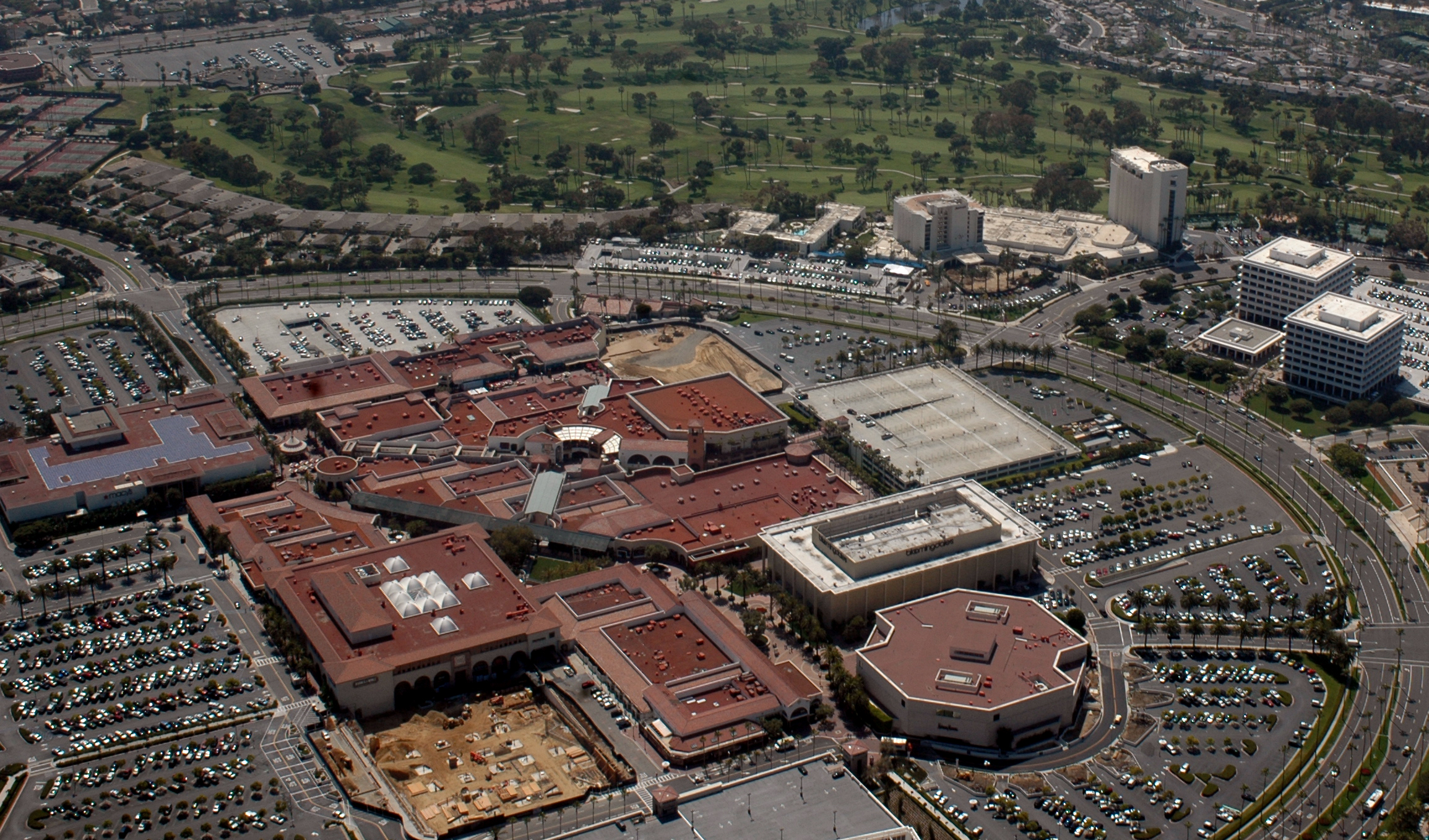
Fashion Island in Newport Beach, CA

In February 1990, all Bullocks Wilshire stores were rebranded as I. Magnin, including the Fashion Island location. Buffum's closed the following year as part of a chain-wide liquidation, with its building subdivided in 1992 to accommodate several uses including a Circuit City store. Other new additions that same year included The Cheesecake Factory adjacent to I. Magnin, a Bookstar book store near the property's cinema, and a new multi-tenant restaurant building with a Hard Rock Cafe on the property's perimeter.

May Department Stores opted to consolidate its two West Coast department store chains (Robinson's and May Company California) into a single business unit, resulting in the rebranding of most Robinson's and May Co. department stores - including the Robinson's at Fashion Island - to Robinsons-May in 1993.

The I. Magnin brand was phased out by parent company Federated Department Stores in 1995, with the Fashion Island location rebranded as a Bullock's Women's Store in June of that same year.

The purchase of Broadway Stores, Inc. - the parent company of The Broadway - by Bullock's owner Federated Department Stores in 1996 led to another significant shift in the property's anchors. Federated announced it would rebrand the Broadway fleet of department stores into Macy's or Bloomingdale's, closing redundant locations in the process. The Bullock's Women's store at Fashion Island was converted to a women's-only Macy's store in the summer of 1996. The Broadway, the sole remaining anchor from the property's 1967 opening, was renovated and reopened as Bloomingdale's in the fall of 1996, as part of the company's entry into California. The arrival of Bloomingdale's was considered a major achievement for Fashion Island, beating its rival South Coast Plaza in a bidding war for the department store's first Orange County location. The third floor of the Atrium Court building was converted into a separate Bloomingdale's Home Store in 1997.

The first Fleming's Prime Steakhouse & Wine Bar opened adjacent to the Hard Rock Cafe in 1998, followed by then-sister concept Roy's the following year.

Fashion Island was renovated once more in 2003, strengthening the property's Mediterranean design and adding refreshed landscaping, architectural elements, and a new carousel.

The Hard Rock Cafe closed in 2005, and was replaced by Blue Coral, a short-lived seafood concept from Fleming's and Roy's parent OSI International (now Bloomin' Brands). That same year, a major renovation to the property's Neiman Marcus created a third level above the still-operating department store.

The 2006 merger of Federated Department Stores and May Department Stores brought another wave of changes to Fashion Island. The property's Robinsons-May store became a full-line Macy's store, while the stand-alone Macy's Women's store was shuttered and sold to The Irvine Company for future development. Bookstar rebranded as Barnes & Noble, and moved to a significantly larger space in the Atrium Court that same year.

In 2009, The Irvine Company began another renovation to the property, at a cost of $100 million. The renovation project included the demolition and replacement of the former Macy's Women's store with Nordstrom, the construction of a new multi-tenant building with a flagship Dean & Deluca next to the Atrium Court, the replacement of the Island Terrace food court with upscale restaurants, and a re-leasing initiative aimed at bringing more upscale tenants to the property.

== 2010 to present ==
The Great Recession led to several changes at Fashion Island. The 2009 bankruptcy and subsequent liquidation of Circuit City led to the addition of a large-scale Forever 21 store in 2010. Dean & Deluca cancelled its plans to open at Fashion Island in 2009, causing a delay in the construction of the multi-tenant building it was slated to occupy. Whole Foods Market signed on as a replacement for Dean & Deluca in 2011, opening in 2012 along with Dick's Sporting Goods and Ulta Beauty.

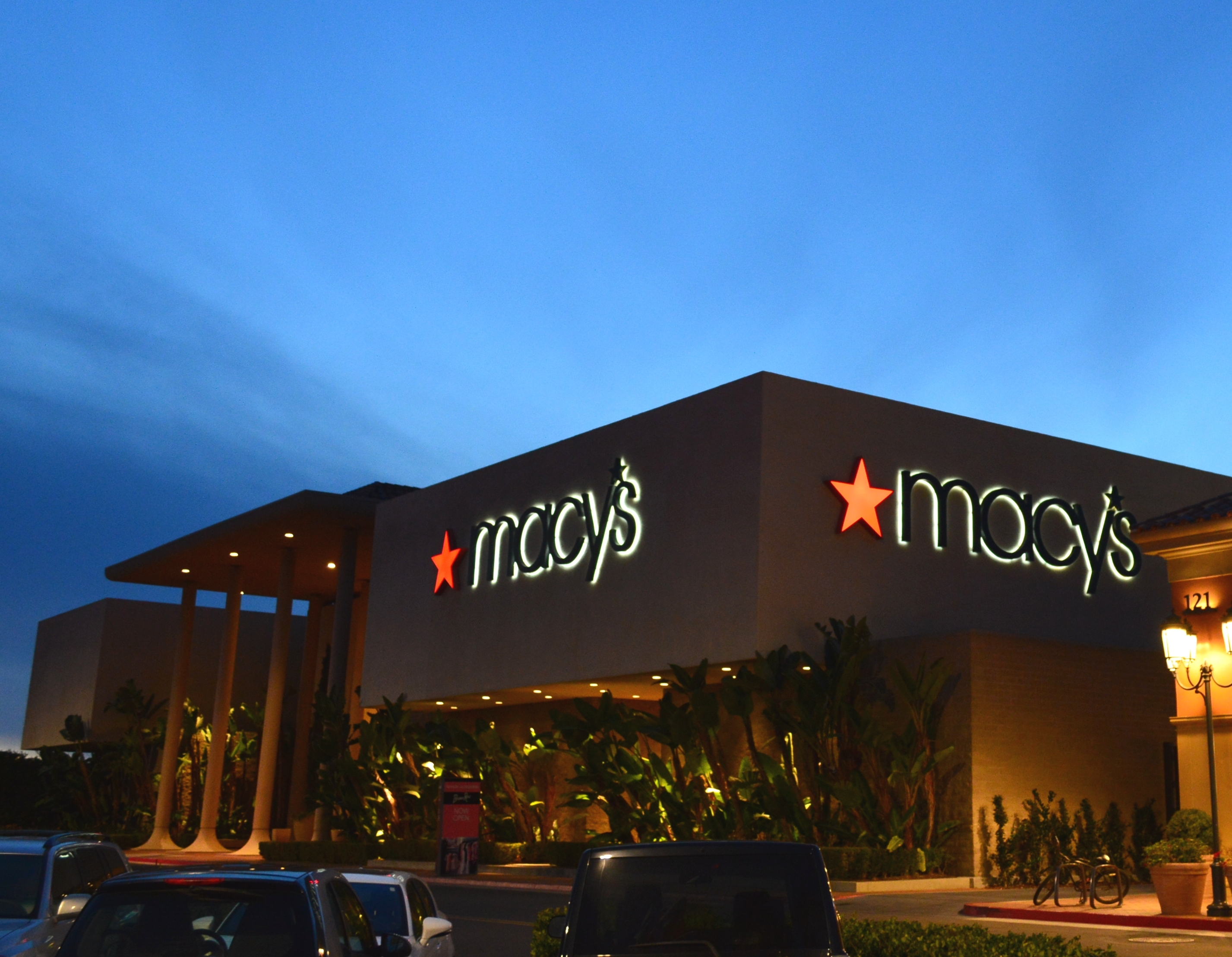
Macy's store at Fashion Island

Edwards Cinemas sold their Island Terrace cinema in 2011 to The Irvine Company, who renovated the seven-screen complex and reopened it as the Island Cinema in December 2011. Several changes came about on the property's perimeter, with True Food Kitchen supplanting Blue Coral in 2010, the El Torito Grill closing in 2012, and the construction of several new buildings on the property's southern side in 2013. A multi-tenant building was constructed on former parking space adjacent to Macy's, and two new restaurant buildings—intended for upscale restaurants Fig & Olive and Red O—were constructed at the property's southern entrance. Finally, the El Torito Grill became locally owned restaurant concept Cucina Enoteca in 2014.

Suitsupply and Rodd & Gunn opened retail locations in 2017. The Island Cinema closed in 2017 and was leased by upscale cinema operator The Lot, which renovated the theater and reopened it the following year. Roy's and Fig & Olive closed in 2019 and 2022 respectively. JOEY, a Canadian restaurant group, opened in the former Roy's space in late 2022.

Forever 21 closed its Fashion Island store as part of a bankruptcy filing in 2019. The building sat vacant until 2022, when it was demolished to make room for a large-scale RH gallery store; which opened as RH Newport Beach, the Gallery at Fashion Island, in 2024.

A tourist from New Zealand was killed in a robbery incident in the parking lot of Fashion Island in July 2024.
