= Lee Roy Selmon's =

- Industry: Restaurant
- Genre: Casual dining
- Founded: 2000; 26 years ago Tampa, Florida, U.S.
- Founder: Lee Roy Selmon
- Defunct: 2018
- Area served: Florida, U.S.
- Key people: Lee Roy Selmon; Robert D. Basham; Chris T. Sullivan
- Products: Southern cuisine
- Parent: MVP Holdings Tampa, Inc.

Lee Roy Selmon's was an American casual dining restaurant chain located and founded in Florida by former NFL player Lee Roy Selmon. Lee Roy Selmon's served Southern-style food and comfort food, such as fried green tomatoes and pecan pie.

The concept was originally owned by OSI Restaurant Partners until 2008, when it was sold to Outback Steakhouse founders Robert D. "Bob" Basham and Chris T. Sullivan. Lee Roy Selmon continued to work with the company through its transfer of ownership until he died in 2011. There were three locations, all of which were located in west-central Florida. It was announced on May 23, 2018, that the original location would close after 17 years.
