= Out West Restaurant Group =

American Private Equity Firm

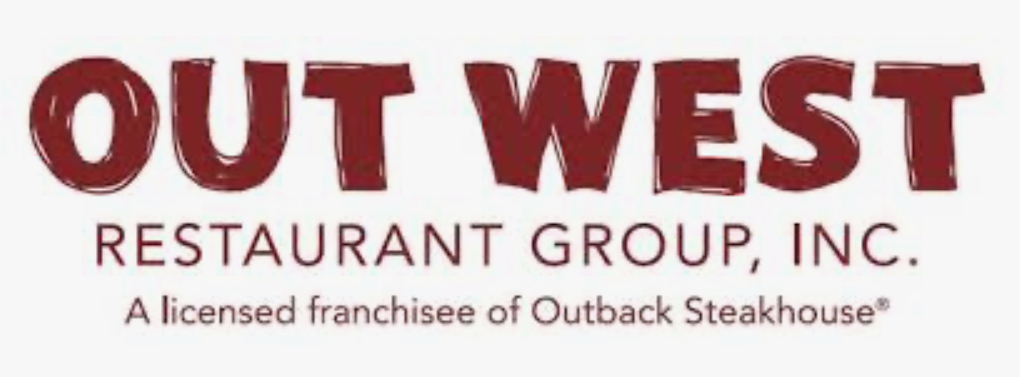

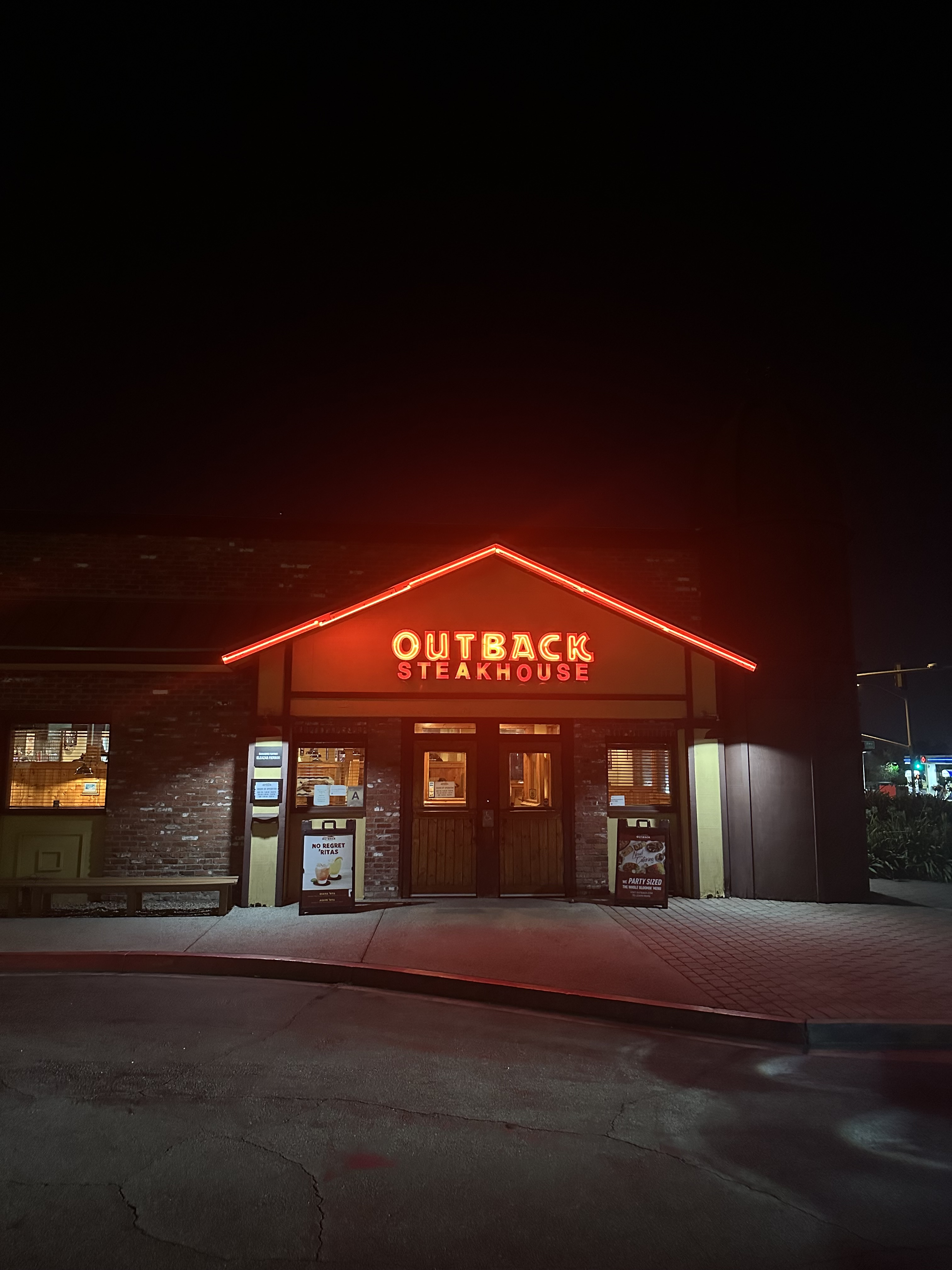
- An Outback restaurant in Upland, California in August 2024
- Formerly: T-Bird Restaurant Group (1994-2017)
- Type: Private
- Industry: Restaurants
- Genre: Casual dining
- Founded: 1992; 34 years ago
- Founder: Thomas J. Shannon Jr.
- Headquarters: San Diego, California (formerly La Jolla, California), United States
- Area served: California, Nevada, Arizona, Colorado, and New Mexico
- Key people: David Goronkin (CEO), Mike Wong (CFO), Steve Muhlbaum, Marilyn Wineman
- Products: Australian themed American cuisine
- Revenue: US$ ~4.2 million (annually)
- Website: Out West Restaurant Group

Out West Restaurant Group Inc. (legally operating as Cerca Trova Restaurant Group Holdings) is an American Private Equity Firm based in San Diego, California. Out West operates and franchises the West Coast Branch of the national Australian-themed steakhouse chain Outback Steakhouse, along with other subsidiaries of Bloomin’ Brands, including Fleming’s Prime Steakhouse & Wine Bar, Carrabba’s Italian Grill, and Bonefish Grill. The company currently operates these locations in California, Nevada, Arizona, Colorado, and New Mexico.

== History ==
Out West Restaurant Group was founded by Thomas J. Shannon Jr. in 1992, under T-Bird Restaurant Group. The company would separately operate a select number of Outback Steakhouse locations, exclusively in California. T-Bird operated out of their original headquarters in La Jolla, California.

Before 1992, all Outback locations were corporately owned by Bloomin' Brands and were mostly located on the East Coast of the United States. Under Shannon's leadership, T-Bird grew to operate over 60 Outback locations in California, and even resulted in the California Restaurant Association Educational Foundation named Tom the "Restaurateur of the Year, 2002." Initially, T-Bird did not operate any Outback restaurants. The first Outback location owned by T-Bird opened in 1994 in Upland, California. After this, many other Outback restaurants opened in the Metropolitan LA area.

In 2009, Mike Wong was named EVP and CFO of Cerca Trova Restaurant Concepts, the company that would ultimately take over T-Bird in 2018.

=== Pribate Equity Buyout and Merger ===
In October 2015, T-Bird, and its 62 Outback locations, were acquired by H.I.G. Capital, a private equity firm based in Miami, Florida. This buyout resulted in the company's stock ultimately going private, leaving its exact financial status largely unknown.

In 2018, the now privately owned T-Bird merged with now struggling Cerca Trova Restaurant Concepts, and created a new company, which would be named Out West Restaurant Group Inc, due to their large footprint of Outback restaurants located on the West Coast. This newly formed company moved from its La Jolla base to its new headquarters in San Diego, California. This new company then started to acquire Outback locations in many other states, including Nevada, Arizona, Colorado, and New Mexico, while also growing their already large footprint in California. At its peak, Out West operated over 100 locations in five states, all in the West Coast, and was the largest franchise of Bloomin' Brands locations in the world.

=== Bankruptcy ===
On November 2, 2026, Out West Restaurant Group, under Cerca Trova Restaurant Group Holdings, filed for Chapter 11 bankruptcy protection, under CEO David Goronkin. The company filed for bankruptcy due to rising food costs and California's minimum wage increase. According to bankruptcy documents, the company began having financial difficulties in 2018, which worsened during the pandemic, when total revenue decreased by 35%. During the mid-to late 2010s, Out West took on large amounts of debt to help further expand the brand. However, traffic declines and rising costs left the company unable to meet its obligations, and have accumulated nearly $320 million in secured debt. As of October 25, Out West had $5.7 million in its bank account, with that amount expected to decrease to $3.4 million by the filing date.

== Bankruptcy ==
On November 2, 2026, Out West Restaurant Group, under Cerca Trova Restaurant Group Holdings, filed for Chapter 11 bankruptcy protection, under CEO David Goronkin. The company filed for bankruptcy due to rising food costs and California's minimum wage increase. According to bankruptcy documents, the company began having financial difficulties in 2018, which worsened during the pandemic, when total revenue decreased by 35%. During the mid-to late 2010s, Out West took on large amounts of debt to help further expand the brand. However, traffic declines and rising costs left the company unable to meet its obligations, and have accumulated nearly $320 million in secured debt. As of October 25, Out West had $5.7 million in its bank account, with that amount expected to decrease to $3.4 million by the filing date.
