= This Is Your Day =

- Program intertitle
- Genre: Religious broadcasting
- Starring: Benny Hinn
- Country of origin: United States

Production
- Running time: 30 minutes

Original release
- Network: syndicated
- Release: 1990 – present

This is Your Day is a Christian television show hosted by Pastor Benny Hinn. The program began airing in 1990 and is a half-hour long. It was broadcast several times a week in the United States and globally by the Trinity Broadcasting Network (TBN), INSP Networks, The God Channel and various local affiliates to an estimated four million followers. However, TBN dropped the program in 2016, and Daystar stopped airing it in 2017. As of April 2025, Hinn's website lists Kenneth Copeland's Victory Channel as the only network broadcasting This Is Your Day, with a single weekly airing.

== Synopsis ==
During the program, Benny Hinn and his guests teach, read letters, pray, and show highlights from Hinn's "Miracle Healing Services." Hinn and his crew travel the world frequently, and a large part of the show is devoted to his global services, in which Hinn is said to imbue people with the power of the Holy Spirit. Many claim to have risen from wheelchairs or to have been healed of other ailments. Towards the final portion of the program Hinn offers gifts such as books, CDs, DVDs and downloadable materials as a thank-you to viewers who donate to the ministry. He then prays for the prayer needs of his viewing audience. Finally he concludes with an invitation for viewers to receive Jesus as their personal savior.

== Controversy ==
The program has generated controversy due to widespread skepticism about Hinn's faith healings depicted in the show. Investigative news programs such as Inside Edition, Dateline NBC, and The Fifth Estate claim that Hinn uses the power of suggestion to make crusade attendees fall on stage and believe they're cured.

== See also ==
- Good Morning, Holy Spirit
- Live Prayer
