= Bounce TV =

American digital multicast television network

- Type: Digital broadcast television network; (general entertainment programming)
- Country: United States
- Broadcast area: Nationwide via OTA digital television; (81% U.S. coverage)
- Affiliates: See List of affiliates
- Headquarters: Atlanta, Georgia

Programming
- Language: English
- Picture format: 1080i (HDTV); (downconverted to 480i and transmitted in either 16:9 widescreen or 4:3 letterbox)

Ownership
- Owner: Scripps Networks, LLC (E. W. Scripps Company)
- Parent: Bounce Media, LLC
- Key people: Ryan Glover (president); Jonathan Katz (COO)

History
- Launched: September 26, 2011; 15 years ago

Links
- Website: bouncetv.com

Bounce TV is an American digital broadcast television network owned by Scripps Networks, a subsidiary of E. W. Scripps Company. It launched on September 26, 2011, and was promoted as "the first 24/7 digital multicast broadcast network created to target African Americans". Bounce features a mix of original and acquired programming geared toward African Americans between 25 and 54 years of age.

The network has affiliates with terrestrial television and television station in many media markets through digital subchannels. It is also available on the digital cable tiers of select cable providers at the discretion of local affiliates, as well as on Dish Network, DirecTV and Frndly TV.

== History ==
=== Founding and launch ===
The founding group and initial ownership team included Martin Luther King III; former mayor of Atlanta, Georgia and ambassador of the United States to the United Nations; Andrew Young and his son Andrew "Bo" Young III; Rob Hardy; and Will Packer. Hardy and Packer are also co-founders of Rainforest Films, a top African-American production company. Spearheading the network's creation were former Turner Broadcasting System executives Jonathan Katz and Ryan Glover with the pair having previously worked together with Tyler Perry to produce a number of high-order African-American sitcoms for TBS. Currently, Glover is president of Bounce TV and Katz is Chief Operating Officer. The "Bounce TV" name was chosen as a branding avenue to signify that the network is "going somewhere with energy".

The network formally launched on September 26, 2011 at 12:00 p.m. Eastern Time Zone, with the 1978 musical film The Wiz as its inaugural broadcast followed by A Raisin in the Sun with Do the Right Thing in primetime. The movie in primetime on the second day was Spike Lee's School Daze. This would be followed two days later with its first sports telecast, Central Intercollegiate Athletic Association football.

In 2012, Bounce began airing original programming. Its first was the documentary Dr. Martin Luther King, Jr.: A Historical Perspective on January 16, 2012, in observance of Martin Luther King Jr. Day. On June 18, 2012, Bounce premiered the sitcom Family Time, and the stand-up comedy series Uptown Comic.

The network acquired its first sitcoms in January 2015. It acquired the rights to four series through deals with Warner Bros. Television Studios (The Parent 'Hood and Roc), The Carsey–Warner Company (A Different World), CBS Television Distribution/Big Ticket Entertainment (Judge Joe Brown), 20th Television (The Hughleys) and Trifecta Entertainment & Media (Judge Faith). The 1990s CBS series Cosby was immediately removed from Bounce's schedule on July 7, 2015 after Bill Cosby's past admissions about his sexual assault allegations were publicized.

Bounce would premiere several notable original programs and tent-pole event broadcasts in 2016. On Friday, January 29, the network broadcast the 24th Annual Trumpet Awards; which honored history-making individuals. On March 6, 2016, Bounce debuted its original primetime soap, Saints & Sinners. The series premiere was watched in 1.3 million viewers, making it Bounce TV's most-watched program at the time. The network's first primetime news magazine, Ed Gordon, was announced in late June 2016, and premiered on Tuesday, September 13.

=== Scripps ownership ===
On October 2, 2017, E. W. Scripps Company purchased Bounce TV, along with Katz Broadcasting's three other networks. A list of 2019 Nielsen Media Research ratings published by Variety indicated that Bounce averaged 275,000 viewers in prime time, down 1% from the 2018 average.

Bounce and sister channel Grit TV were added to DirecTV on September 1, 2022.

On April 23, 2024, it was reported that Scripps was looking to sell Bounce TV.

== Programming ==
Bounce TV features programming geared toward an African-American audience that skews older than the demographic of most cable networks (such as rival cable network BET); primarily adults between the ages of 25 and 54. The network's main programming features a mix of scripted series reruns and feature film telecasts. Unlike most digital multicast services (particularly with the January 2015 shutdown of Localish, which mainly carried first-run content), Bounce also produces its own original programming. The network has produced inspirational and music programming, documentaries, scripted comedies and dramas, films, and specials.

=== Sports ===
Shortly before its launch, Bounce TV reached an agreement with the Central Intercollegiate Athletic Association (a league that includes several historically black colleges and universities) to acquire the television rights to broadcast its American football and basketball games; the telecasts were produced by Urban Sports Entertainment Group. The first sports broadcast on Bounce TV aired on September 28, 2011, a college football game between Bowie State University and Virginia Union University. Bounce's HBCU-centered sports programming expanded in 2013 before ceasing prior to the 2014 season (with Aspire acquiring the rights to some of the HBCU football telecasts).

On May 7, 2015, Bounce TV announced that they would be airing live boxing events from Premier Boxing Champions under the title: PBC: The Next Round.

=== List of programs broadcast by Bounce TV ===
==== Current programming ====
===== Original =====
Title	Genre	Premiere	Seasons	Length	Status
Mind Your Business	Sitcom	June 1, 2024	2 seasons, 20 episodes	22 min	Pending

===== Syndicated =====
- The Bernie Mac Show
- Couples Court with the Cutlers
- Family Feud Favorites
- Inspiration Ministries Campmeeting
- In the Heat of the Night
- The Jennifer Hudson Show
- Karamo
- Lauren Lake's Paternity Court
- NCIS: Los Angeles
- Someone They Knew with Tamron Hall
- S.W.A.T.
- Tamron Hall

==== Former original programming ====
===== Drama =====
Title	Genre	Premiere	Finale	Seasons	Length	Notes
Saints & Sinners	Crime drama	March 6, 2016	May 22, 2022	6 seasons, 49 episodes	44 min	
Johnson	Comedy drama	August 1, 2021	October 5, 2024	4 seasons, 40 episodes	22 min	

===== Comedy =====
Title	Genre	Premiere	Finale	Seasons	Length	Notes
Family Time	Sitcom	June 18, 2012	December 16, 2020	8 seasons, 91 episodes	21–22 min	
One Love	Sitcom	April 8, 2014	May 27, 2014	1 season, 8 episodes	22 min	
Mann & Wife	Sitcom	April 7, 2015	May 23, 2017	3 seasons, 30 episodes	22 min	
In the Cut	Sitcom	August 25, 2015	September 30, 2020	7 seasons, 85 episodes	22 min	
Grown Folks	Sitcom	October 2, 2017	December 18, 2017	1 season, 13 episodes	22 min	
Last Call	Sitcom	January 14, 2019	April 1, 2019	1 season, 13 episodes	21 min	
My Crazy Roommate	Sitcom	October 14, 2019	December 16, 2019	1 season, 10 episodes	22 min	
Finding Happy	Comedy	September 24, 2022	November 19, 2022	1 season, 10 episodes	22 min	
Act Your Age	Sitcom	March 4, 2023	July 29, 2023	1 season, 16 episodes	22 min	

===== Docuseries =====
Title	Subject	Premiere	Finale	Seasons	Length	Notes
Dying to Be Famous: The Ryan Singleton Mystery	True crime	November 1, 2020	November 29, 2020	6 episodes	42 min	Miniseries

===== Reality =====
Title	Subject	Premiere	Finale	Seasons	Length	Notes
Forever Jones	Docu-reality	December 18, 2012	July 10, 2013	1 season, 7 episodes	42 min	

===== Variety =====
Title	Genre	Premiere	Finale	Seasons	Length	Notes
Uptown Comic	Stand-up comedy	June 18, 2012	October 15, 2012	1 season, 10 episodes	42 min	
Off the Chain	Stand-up comedy	October 22, 2012	December 15, 2015	3 seasons, 27 episodes	42 min	
Ed Gordon	Newsmagazine	September 13, 2016	February 17, 2018	5 episodes	42–44 min	

==== Former syndicated programming ====
- America's Black Forum
- A Different World
- B. Smith with Style
- Black and Blue
- Black College Quiz
- Catch 21
- The Cosby Show
- Cosby
- Everybody Hates Chris
- Fat Albert and the Cosby Kids
- Forgive or Forget
- The Game
- Greenleaf
- Half & Half
- Hot Bench
- The Hughleys
- Judge Faith
- Judge Hatchett
- Judge Joe Brown
- Law & Order
- Living Single
- Moesha
- NCIS: New Orleans
- The Newlywed Game
- Nick Cannon
- OJ25
- One on One
- The Parent 'Hood
- Personal Injury Court
- The Real (day-after repeats)
- Roc
- Scandal
- Sherri
- Soul Train
- The Wendy Williams Show (day-after repeats)
- With Drawn Arms
- Without a Trace

== Affiliates ==
As of December 2014, Bounce TV has current or pending affiliation agreements with television stations in 43 media markets encompassing 22 states and the Washington, D.C., covering 73% of all households of at least one television set in the United States and 90% of African-American households. The network encourages its affiliates to carry local news programming in place of regular programming on the Bounce-affiliated subchannel, as a way to attract additional viewers to that subchannel and serve the local market. Affiliates also broadcast local public affairs programs, political specials, and college football and basketball games played by predominantly black schools. In Bounce TV's Home city Atlanta, ABC affiliate WSB-TV (channel 2), owned by Cox Media Group, is the Atlanta affiliate for Bounce TV.

Before its launch, Bounce TV actively sought affiliation agreements with various television station owners to make the network widely available throughout the United States. The network launched with clearance rate of, at minimum, 32% of overall American television households, in part due to affiliation agreements with stations owned by Nexstar Media Group, Gray Television, Lockwood Broadcast Group, and the E. W. Scripps Company.

In November 2011, Bounce TV reached a groupwide affiliation deal with Fox Television Stations to carry the network on the subchannels of its MyNetworkTV owned-and-operated station in markets such as New York City (WWOR-TV) and Los Angeles (KCOP-TV). The deal, which marked Fox Television Station's first multicasting arrangement, put Bounce TV over its earlier stated goal of reaching at least 50% of overall U.S. television households. The network also began to be cleared on subchannels of eight Raycom Media-owned stations as 2012 began.

In December 2012, the network signed a multi-station agreement with Spanish language broadcaster Univision Communications to carry its programming on seven of its Univision and UniMás owned-and-operated television stations (besides being the company's first multicasting agreement, it was also Univision Television Group's first affiliation deal involving an English language network). As part of an extension of this agreement in March 2014, Bounce TV will move its affiliation in five markets where it had existing affiliation deals with Fox at the time of the deal (New York City, Los Angeles, Dallas–Fort Worth, Texas, Orlando, Florida, and Phoenix, Arizona) to stations owned by Univision in 2015. The Fox deal ended after the 2015 launch of game show channel Buzzr, with Bounce then moving in full to Univision stations after that point.

On June 15, 2016, Katz Broadcasting (whose president and CEO Jonathan Katz is COO of Bounce TV) signed an agreement with Nexstar Broadcasting Group that would bring Bounce TV to 15 new markets, as part of a massive rollout also involving Katz's three networks Escape, Laff, and Grit. In 2019, Raycom merged with Gray Television, which will maintain their Bounce affiliations as-is.

Although Bounce TV prefers that its local affiliates carry the entire schedule, some affiliates regularly pre-empt certain network programs in order to air morning and/or prime time newscasts produced by the station specifically for the subchannel or public affairs programs (such as with WBTV in Charlotte and WAVE-TV in Louisville); this has become particularly more common since September 2015, when other Gray Television-owned stations in markets where the group does not maintain a duopoly (as is the case with WBTV and WAVE-TV, which launched theirs earlier) gradually began launching prime time newscasts on their Bounce TV-affiliated subchannels. Some of the major network affiliates that carry Bounce TV full-time (such as WBTV, WAVE-TV and WAFF in Huntsville) use the affiliated subchannel as a buffer during network sports coverage, breaking news or severe weather coverage situations to carry regularly scheduled network and/or syndicated programming seen on its main channel.

Following Scripps' acquisition of Ion Media on January 7, 2021, Scripps began to wind down the Univision deal, and Bounce TV was moved off those stations to Ion Media stations at the start of March, though it remains on a Univision station in markets where Scripps or Ion do not operate stations.

== Bounce Media ==
Bounce Media, LLC
- Type: Subsidiary
- Industry: Entertainment
- Founded: April 4, 2011; 15 years ago
- Founders: Martin Luther King III; Andrew Young
- Headquarters: Marietta, Georgia, U.S.
- Parent: Scripps Networks, LLC

Bounce Media operates Bounce TV and is owned by its founding group plus Raycom Media and Al Haymon. With share staff and some owners, Katz Broadcasting is an affiliate company.^{1}

Originally, Bounce Media sold the network to affiliated TV stations via ad split but by October 2015 had moved to a carriage fee in exchange for the network get the ad inventory due to greater inventory with stations adding a third or fourth subchannel.^{1} Bounce used direct response advertising as a meter of viewers before switching to Nielsen rating C-3 a few years before 2015.^{3}

Bounce launched a companion SVOD service, Brown Sugar by November 17, 2016. Brown Sugar features '70s-era blaxploitation films. The service has access to start to a total of 111 films including Blacula, Cleopatra Jones, Foxy Brown, The Mack, Super Fly, and Shaft.

On August 1, 2017, E. W. Scripps announced the purchase of Bounce and Katz Broadcasting, which operates Bounce and owns three networks, for $292 million, acquiring the other 95% of the company. Bounce will remain based out of Marietta, Georgia and retain Jonathan Katz as head. The purchase was completed on October 2, 2017.

=== Brown Sugar ===
Brown Sugar
- Website type: SVOD
- Available in: en
- Owners: Bounce Media, LLC
- Website: www.brownsugar.com
- Commercial: Yes
- Registration: Yes
- Launched: 2016; 10 years ago
- Current status: active

Brown Sugar is a video on demand service owned by Bounce Media, LLC. A companion to the main Bounce network, Brown Sugar was launched on November 17, 2016.

The service features '70s-era blaxploitation films via app, the web and Chromecast. The service has access to over 111 films including Blacula, Cleopatra Jones, Foxy Brown, The Mack, Super Fly, and Shaft. On Friday, August 4, 2017, Brown Sugar launched on Roku; boxing matches and in-season original Bounce series have since been added.

== Gallery ==
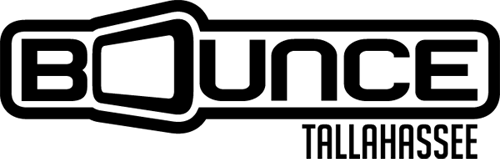

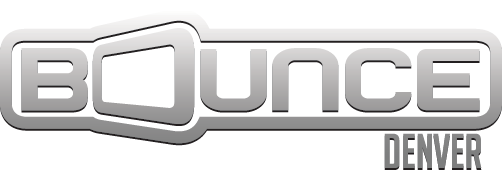

== See also ==
- BET – an American basic cable and satellite channel a part of the Paramount Media Networks, currently owned by Paramount Global, which launched in 1980 as the first television network devoted to programming targeting African-Americans
  - BET Her – spinoff network specifically targeting African-American women
- TV One – an American digital cable and satellite channel owned by Urban One
  - Cleo TV – spinoff network specifically targeting African-American women
- Aspire TV – an American digital cable and satellite channel owned by Magic Johnson
