= Chris T. Sullivan =

American businessperson

- Born: Chris T. Sullivan; February 15, 1948 (age 78); Lake City, Florida, U.S.
- Education: University of Kentucky
- Years active: 1988-present
- Known for: Co-founder Outback Steakhouse restaurant chain and others

Chris T. Sullivan (born February 15, 1948, in Lake City, Florida) is one of the founders of Outback Steakhouse and OSI Restaurant Partners, LLC. He also formerly held the titles of director and chairman. He is currently a board member at Bloomin' Brands.

== Early life and education ==
Sullivan attended Montgomery Blair High School in Silver Spring, Maryland and then the University of Kentucky, where he graduated with a BS in business and economics in 1972. He was a member of the Sigma Alpha Epsilon fraternity. Sullivan's restaurant management career began in 1972 as restaurant manager trainee in the Steak & Ale restaurant group.

== Career ==
Sullivan and co-founders Bob Basham, Tim Gannon and Trudy Cooper opened the first Outback Steakhouse in March 1988. His management of the company saw the chain expand into a worldwide company, with more than 900 restaurants worldwide. He also expanded the brand into numerous subsidiaries, including Carrabba's Italian Grill, Fleming's Prime Steakhouse & Wine Bar, Cheeseburger in Paradise, Bonefish Grill, Paul Lee's Chinese Kitchen and several other hospitality-related businesses.

From February 1991 to March 2005, Sullivan was CEO of OSI Restaurant Partners, Inc. (now called OSI Restaurant Partners, LLC). From August 1987 to February 1991, he was president of the company.

In an interview with Inc.com, Sullivan stated his biggest mistake in his career was the way he handled the rollout of Carrabba's Italian Grill. “With Outback we would approach a new market by developing one new restaurant in the first year and two or three more in the second year. With Carrabba's, we developed four, five, and six restaurants in the first year. We should have gone in and made sure our franchisee partners had opened their first restaurant in a successful manner before we started with a second one.”, he told the interviewer, going on to reveal that not getting the people side right at the restaurant caused major problems that took two years to correct and “a lot of money”".

In 2009, he was acting mentor to Virginia-based restaurant chain Café Caturra.

In recent times, Sullivan has moved into investment; in April 2015, Sullivan led a $2.2 million funding round for the tech startup SiteZeus, a company that automates the site selection process for the restaurant, retail and hospitality industries.

In addition to his current roles, Sullivan serves several organisations in various positions including Florida Council of 100 Executive Committee, the Florida Chamber of Commerce; the board of for the Florida Council on Economic Education, Lowry Park Zoological Endowment Foundation; chairman's board of Big Brothers Big Sisters of America; co-chair and board of Kentucky Speedway; the advisory board for the Salvation Army; and vice chairman for Scripps Florida's funding board; and the Employment Policies Institute.

In 2014, Sullivan was inducted into the Kentucky Entrepreneur Hall of Fame.

== Personal life ==
Sullivan has a passion for golf and along with Outback co-founder Bob Basham and friend Bob Merritt, he established a golfer's club in 1997, Old Memorial Golf Club. He lives in Tampa, Florida and has two children, Alex and Ashley.
