= Metro Diner =

American casual dining restaurant chain

- Founded: 1992
- Headquarters: Tampa, Florida, U.S.
- Number of locations: 66 (2025)
- Key people: Chris Sullivan (Co-Chairman); Hugh Connerty (Co-Chairman); Stanley Goodman (President & COO)
- Website: metrodiner.com

Metro Diner is an American casual dining restaurant chain headquartered in Tampa, Florida. It has 66 locations throughout the United States and was featured in an episode of Diners, Drive-Ins and Dives in 2010.

== History ==
Metro Diner has roots back to 1938 when the first diner was opened in Jacksonville, Florida. It was not officially branded as Metro Diner until 1992 and was purchased by brothers Mark and John Davoli (Jr.) in 2000. Their father joined them a few years later and expanded to several locations in the Jacksonville area, including Mandarin, Ortega, and Jacksonville Beach. In 2010, Metro Diner was featured in an episode of Diners, Drive-Ins and Dives.

ConSul Hospitality Group, made up of Chris Sullivan and Hugh Connerty, partnered with the Davoli family in 2014 to help expand the chain. At that time, the chain had nine locations. By 2018, Metro Diner opened its 50th restaurant and by 2025 had 66 locations throughout the United States.

== Menu ==
Its menu is classic American diner food. It is known for items such as chicken and waffles and meatloaf and serves breakfast, lunch, and dinner.
