= Good Morning, Holy Spirit =

Book by Benny Hinn

- Author: Benny Hinn
- Language: English
- Publisher: Thomas Nelson
- Publication date: 1990
- Publication place: United States
- Media type: Print
- Pages: 177 pp
- ISBN: 978-0-7852-6126-1

Good Morning, Holy Spirit is a best-selling book by Benny Hinn. The book is about Benny Hinn's childhood and how an encounter with the Holy Spirit changed his life.

== Summary ==
The book describes the following facts about Hinn's childhood. Hinn was born Israel. He was raised within the Greek Orthodox tradition and also learned about Catholic traditions. He was lonely as a child because he had a stutter.

Soon after the 1967 Arab–Israeli War ("The Six-Day War"), Hinn's family emigrated to Toronto. In 1973, he attend a "miracle service" conducted by evangelist Kathryn Kuhlman. After attending this service, he learned about the Holy Spirit. He prays to know more about the Holy Spirit. The Holy Spirit then meets Hinn. This changes his life. The Holy Spirit reveals his personality and his emotions based on Bible references. The Holy Spirit asks him to give a sermon. His stutter disappears the moment he started the sermon. The Holy Spirit continues to be with Hinn and guide him.

== Sales and Reception ==
The book was first published in 1990, then revised and expanded in 2004. Millions of copies have been sold. Despite the success, the book was criticized for not conforming completely to Christian teachings.
