= CrossRidge Center =

Mixed-use development in South Carolina

- Interactive map of the CrossRidge Center area

General information
- Location: Indian Land, South Carolina, United States
- Coordinates: 34°57′49″N 80°51′4″W

CrossRidge Center is a mixed-use development located in Indian Land, South Carolina. Following its acquisition in the early 2000s, development for development for a mixed use site was first discussed in 2003. Groundbreaking occurred in 2006, and in 2008 the TV network INSP moved in, the sites first tenant. Up until that point, INSP had occupied multiple locations in and around Charlotte, North Carolina. In 2019, YMCA became the second major tenant to be announced for the under construction development.

== History ==
In 2003, the Lancaster County Economic Development began discussions with CrossRidge principles to develop property in the unincorporated area called Indian Land. State relocation services were applied for, based on the fact that the development at CrossRidge would provide several hundred jobs. The campus would be home to both non-profit enterprises and for-profit businesses. In 2018, the Upper Palmetto YMCA was announced to be constructed on the property. It broke ground in 2019 and opened a year later.

In 2020, a 120,000-square-foot office building was announced, with Perkins Eastman contracted as the designer. It was completed in December 2021. The grade A office space CrossRidge One represents the central office component of the CrossRidge development project. CrossRidge is set to become a premier business location in upstate South Carolina.

In 2024, another major phase was announced at CrossRidge with a $150 million retail phase of the project. Target Stores is scheduled to open a 148,000 sq ft superstore in October 2025. It is scheduled to begin opening in phases starting in the third quarter of 2024, with the Target store anticipated to open around October 2025. Additional amenities include green spaces, a splash pad and outdoor amphitheater. .

== Tenants ==
=== Corporate and mixed-use (selected list) ===
- INSP
- YMCA

=== Retail ===
- Target (planned)
- What-A-Burger
- Metro Diner
- EyeSmart
- Ideal Dental
