= Outback Steakhouse =

American chain steakhouse

- Current Outback logo used since 2006

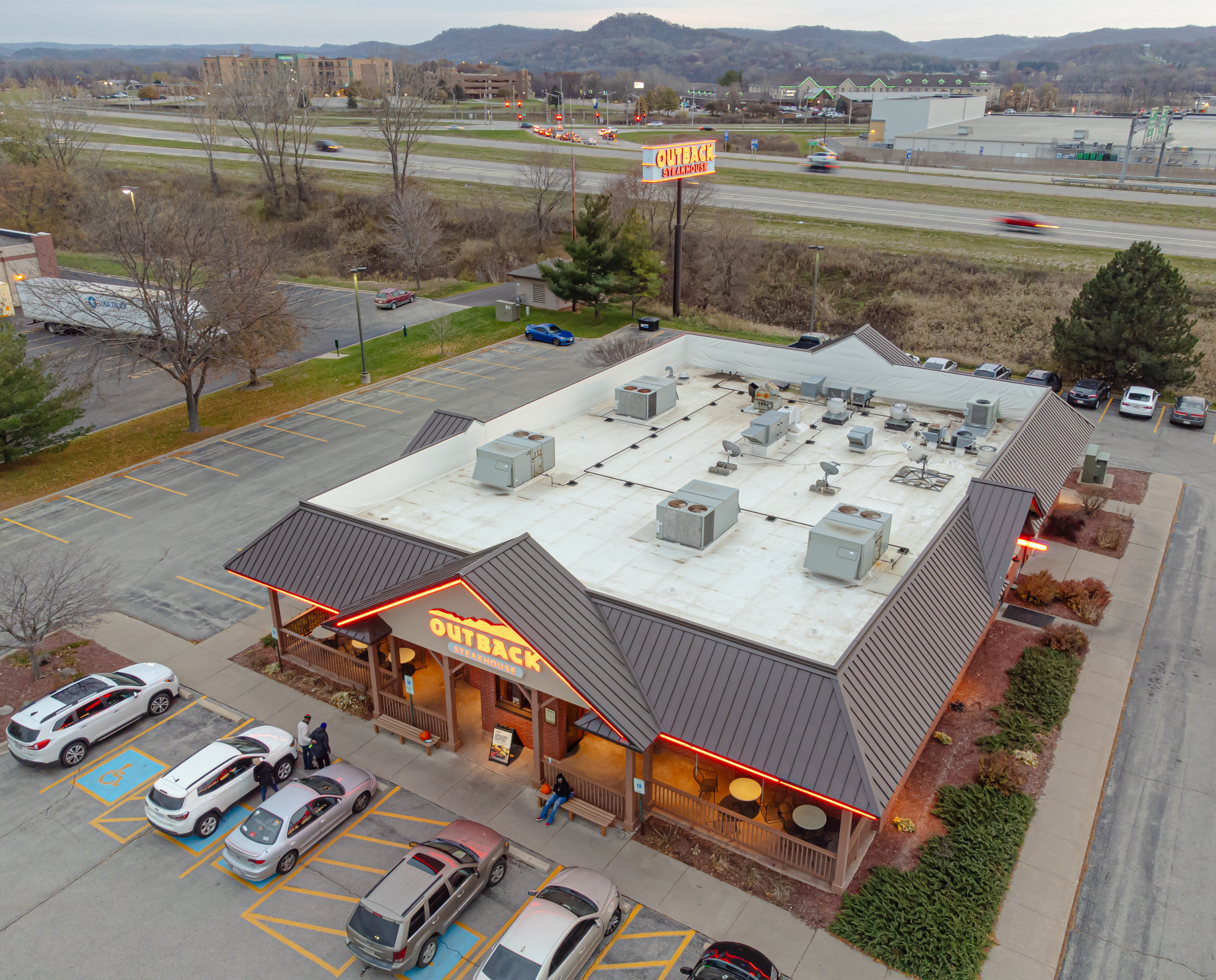
- An Outback restaurant in Onalaska, Wisconsin, November 2023
- Type: Subsidiary
- Industry: Restaurants
- Genre: Casual dining
- Founded: March 15, 1988; 38 years ago
- Founders: Bob Basham; Trudy Cooper; Chris T. Sullivan; Tim Gannon
- Headquarters: Tampa, Florida, United States
- Number of locations: 1,336 (Outdated from December 2015)
- Area served: Argentina; Australia; Brazil; Canada; Chile; Costa Rica; Ecuador; Hong Kong; Indonesia; Japan; Macau; Mexico; New Zealand; Philippines; Qatar; Saudi Arabia; South Korea; United States
- Products: Australian themed American cuisine
- Revenue: US$3.888 billion (2017)
- Parent: Bloomin' Brands
- Website: www.outback.com

Outback Steakhouse is an American chain of Australian-themed casual dining restaurants, serving American cuisine, based in Tampa, Florida. The chain has over 1,000 locations in 23 countries throughout North America, South America, Asia, and Australia. It was founded on March 15, 1988, with its first location in Tampa by Bob Basham, Chris T. Sullivan, Trudy Cooper, and Tim Gannon. It was owned and operated in the United States by OSI Restaurant Partners until it was acquired by Bloomin' Brands, and by other franchise and venture agreements internationally.

== History ==
The first Outback Steakhouse location was opened on March 15, 1988, in Tampa, Florida.

Canadian Outback Steakhouse restaurants began in 1996. In March 2009, Outback Steakhouse Canada abruptly closed all nine locations in the province of Ontario, citing poor economic conditions, but in June 2009, Outback Steakhouse opened a location in Niagara Falls, Ontario, with a second location later opening in the same city. As of 2024, these are the only Outback Steakhouse locations operating in Canada.

Outback locations in Hawaii began to open in the mid 1990s, as part of a massive expansion across the country. On February 17, 2024, Outback’s parent company, Bloomin’ Brands, announced the permanent closure of all remaining Hawaii locations, as part of financial restructuring, citing a significant decrease in profits. This was part of a larger, mass closure of over 41 locations. All three locations in Hawaii were permanently closed by February 18, 2024.

Outback Steakhouse opened in the UK with locations in Birmingham, Basildon, Enfield, Romford, Stevenage, Wandsworth in London and Staines. By September 2011, only its Basildon and Romford stores remained and they closed down on September 13, ending Outback's foray into the UK market.

In 2006, a new Outback logo was introduced, dropping the old kangaroo logo for a more simplistic and modern Outback mountain range logo. With this new logo, Outback then went on an aggressive remodeling campaign, starting in 2008, renovating most of their locations, along with opening brand new ones, for a fresher, more modern look to their business model. This included the removal of their iconic neon signs for more energy efficient LEDs, and the switch from a dark, rustic feel to a brighter, more vibrant look. Today, few original-style Outback locations remain, with most of them either abandoned for newer locations, or renovated.

On June 14, 2007, OSI Restaurant Partners completed a stock repurchase plan, and the company became privately held. In April 2012, Bloomin' Brands, the current owner of Outback Steakhouse, filed with the SEC to raise up to $300 million in an initial public offering. Bloomin' Brands, Inc. became a publicly traded company on NASDAQ under the ticker symbol "BLMN."

Most Outback locations are corporately owned by Bloomin Brands. However, locations in California, Nevada, Arizona, Colorado, and New Mexico are separately owned by a corporate franchisee, Out West Restaurant Group.

Outback Steakhouse currently operates over 1,000 locations worldwide, with 670 in the United States.

In October 2025, Outback Steakhouse closed several locations across multiple U.S. states as part of a broader turnaround plan by its parent company, Bloomin' Brands.

== Menu ==
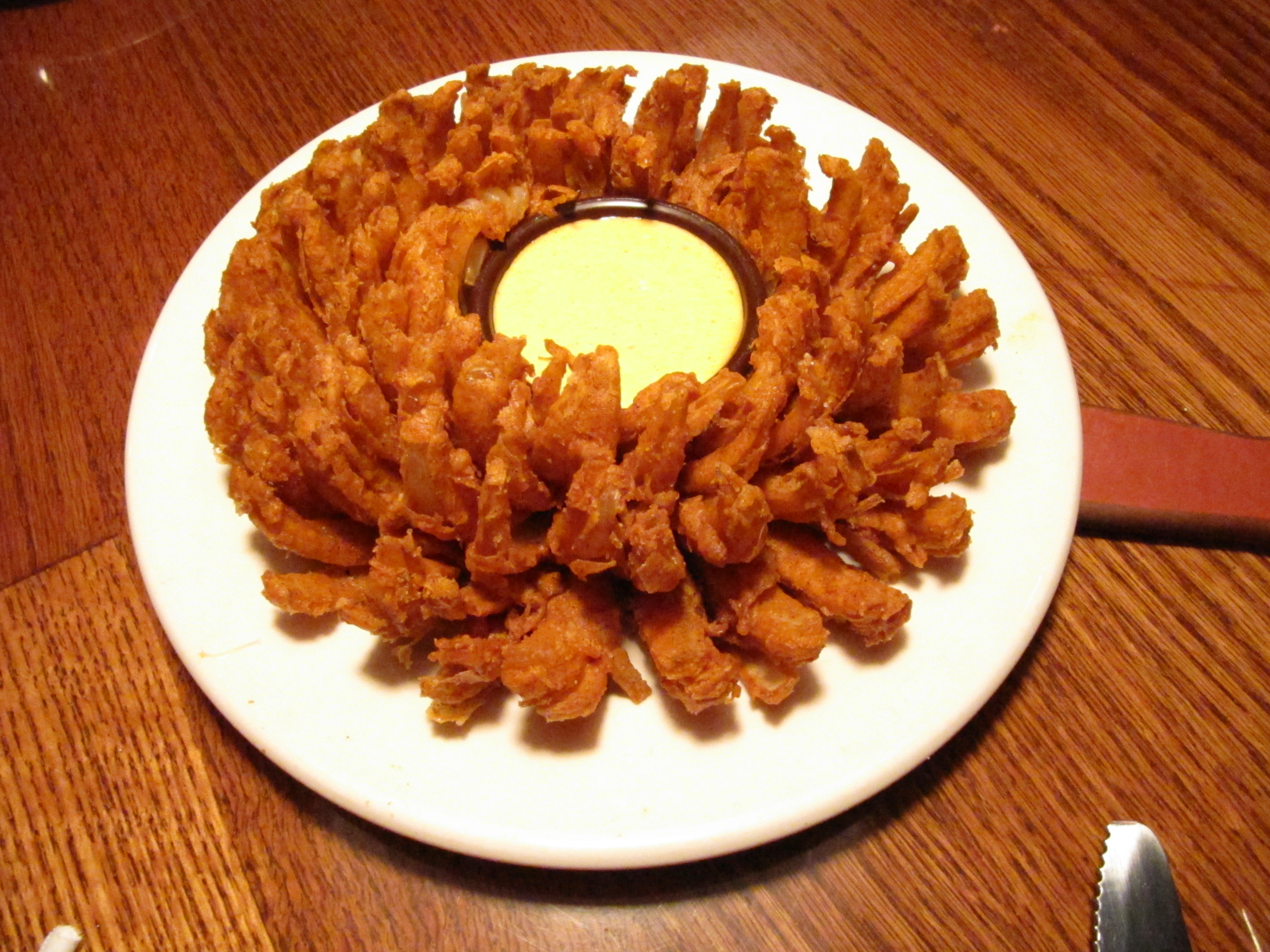
Outback's Bloomin' Onion

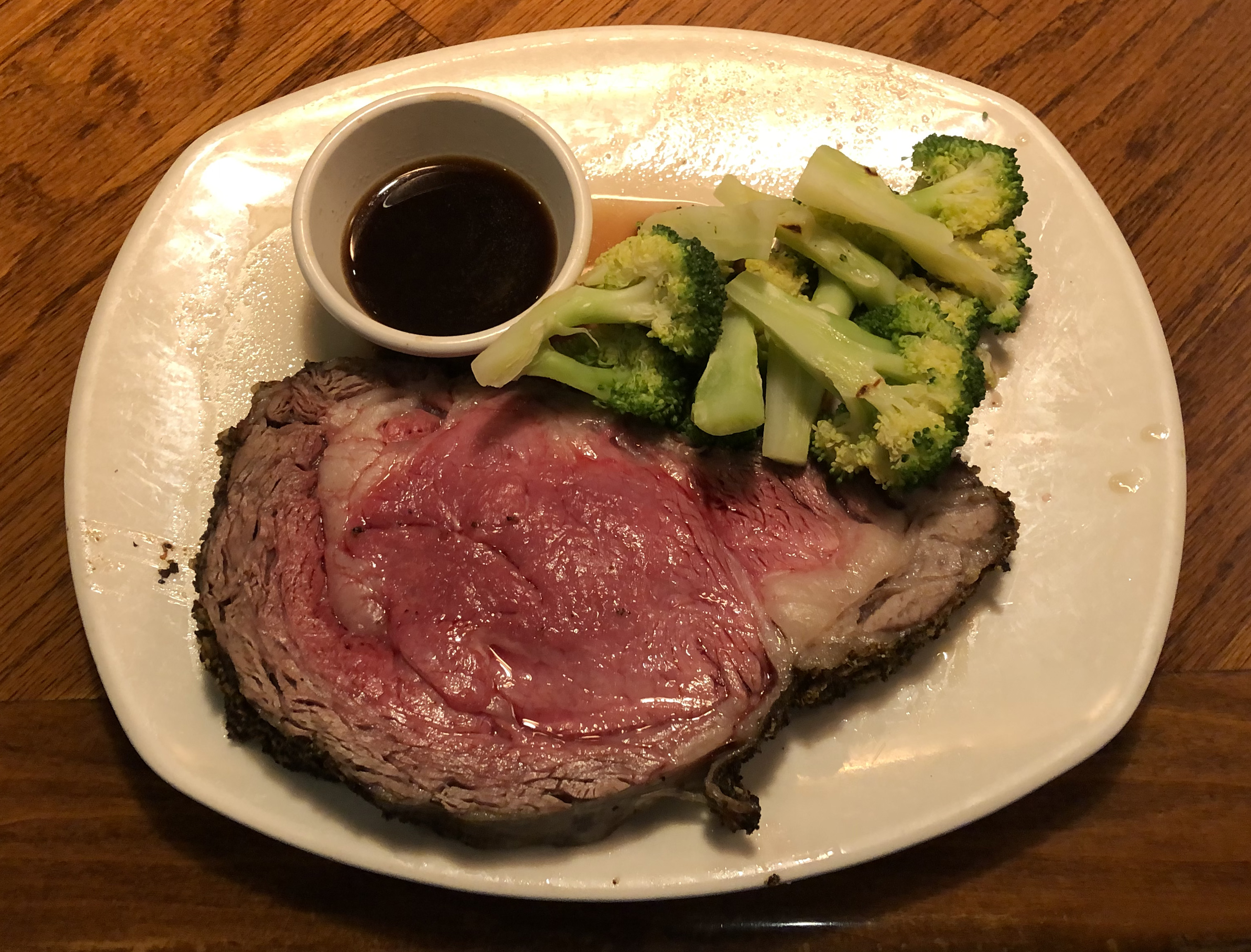
Prime Rib from Outback Steakhouse

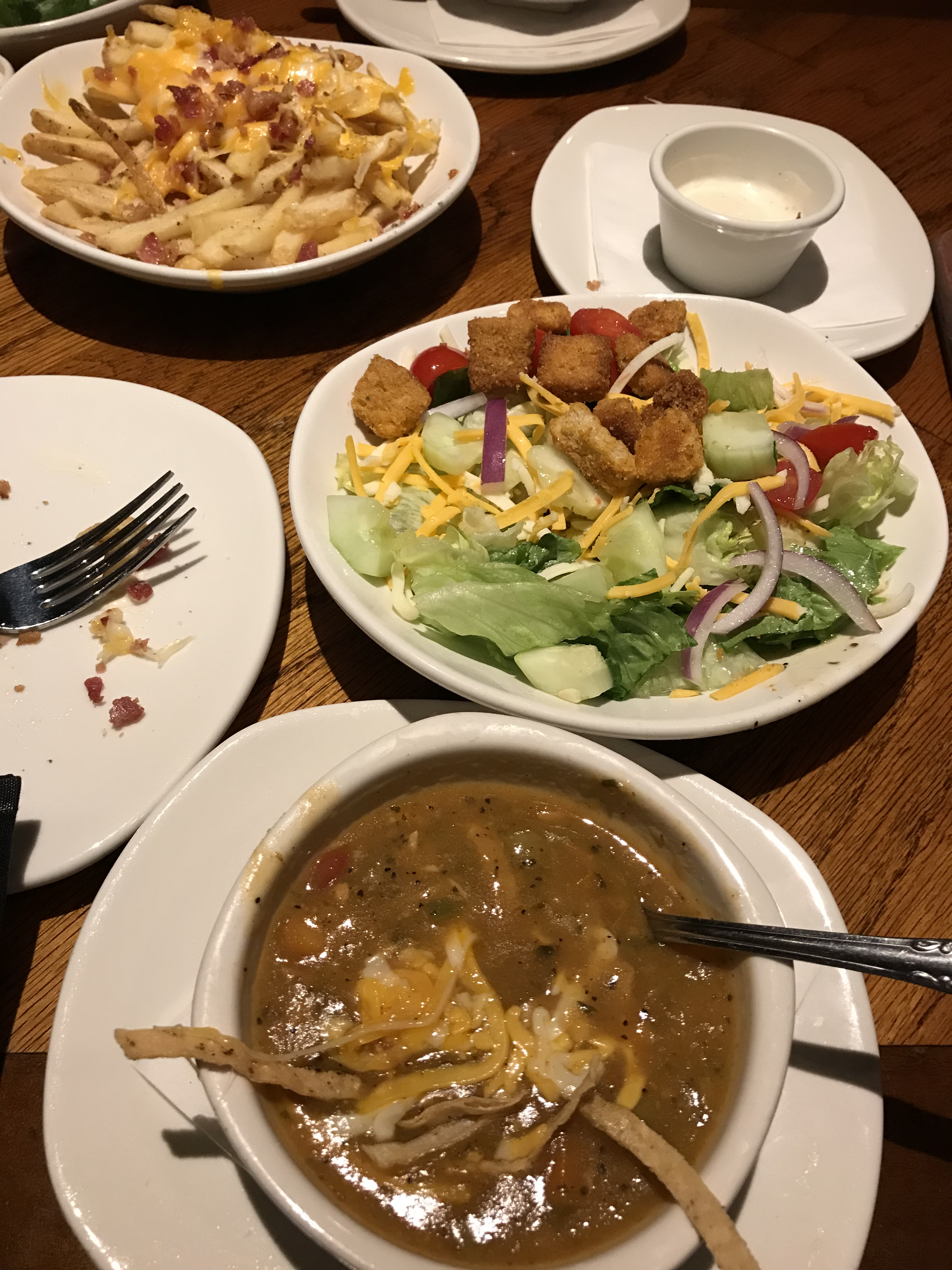
Examples of Outback menu items: Aussie Cheese Fries, House Salad, and Chicken Tortilla Soup from top to bottom

=== Bloomin' Onion ===
The Bloomin' Onion is a signature Outback item, though it is not an Australian item and is not typically sold in Australia apart from at this chain. It is a 1 pound (500 g) onion cut to 'bloom' open, breaded, deep-fried and served with mayonnaise-horseradish sauce. Other restaurants offer items similar to the Bloomin' Onion, as in Chili's Awesome Blossom (discontinued), Texas Roadhouse's Cactus Blossom, and Lone Star Steakhouse & Saloon's Texas Rose. Many of the Bloomin' Onions have come under fire for high-calorie counts, sometimes going over 1,500 calories.

== Involvements ==
=== Community ===
Outback Steakhouse has a program to support the communities in which its restaurants are located. They have also joined GroupRaise, a platform where non-profits can book restaurant fundraisers in their locations. On a national level, Outback partners with Heineken USA and their Heineken with a Heart program to raise funds for various organizations in these communities.

=== Political ===
The company and its founders are major contributors, via the Outback Steakhouse PAC, to the Republican Party, contributing $303,015 and $334,197 for the 2000 and 2004 election cycles, respectively. The PAC remains active, giving $428,000 to federal candidates in the 2017–2018 cycle and raising $464,074 in the 2019–2020 cycle. Since the 2022 cycle its activity has substantially decreased. The PAC gave $93,000 to 37 federal candidates in 2022, and only $12,700 in contributions were recorded from the company in the 2024 cycle. The Outback Steakhouse PAC itself is historically one of the largest donors in the food and beverage sector, second only to the National Restaurant Association, which itself represents 300,000 restaurants.

== Food sourcing ==
=== Cage-free eggs ===
In 2022, Outback Steakhouse's parent company, Bloomin' Brands, announced their commitment to source 100% cage-free eggs across all of their locations by 2030. In 2024, they reported that they had reached this goal in their United States locations.

== Awards ==
Outback Steakhouse was ranked No. 1 in the 2023 American Customer Satisfaction Index (ACSI) restaurant study for overall satisfaction, menu variety, food quality and beverage quality.

The Takeout published a related article, "America is falling in Love with Steakhouses all over again" which discusses the broader steakhouse category and Outback's standing in customer satisfaction coverage.

== Advertising ==
- The company owns two blimps: the Bloomin' Onions I and II, both named after their appetizer.
- For several years, the company ran a media campaign with an Australian-themed variation of the Of Montreal composition "Wraith Pinned to the Mist (And Other Games)."
- General (Ret) Tommy Franks sits on the Board Of Directors for OSI Restaurant Partners, INC., which owns Outback Steakhouse.

=== Sports ===
Outback Steakhouse was the title sponsor of the Outback Champions Series tennis events and NCAA football's Outback Bowl. The sponsorship lasted through 2020.

Outback is also a partner of the Tampa Bay Lightning and has a concession stand in Amalie Arena.

==== Motorsports ====
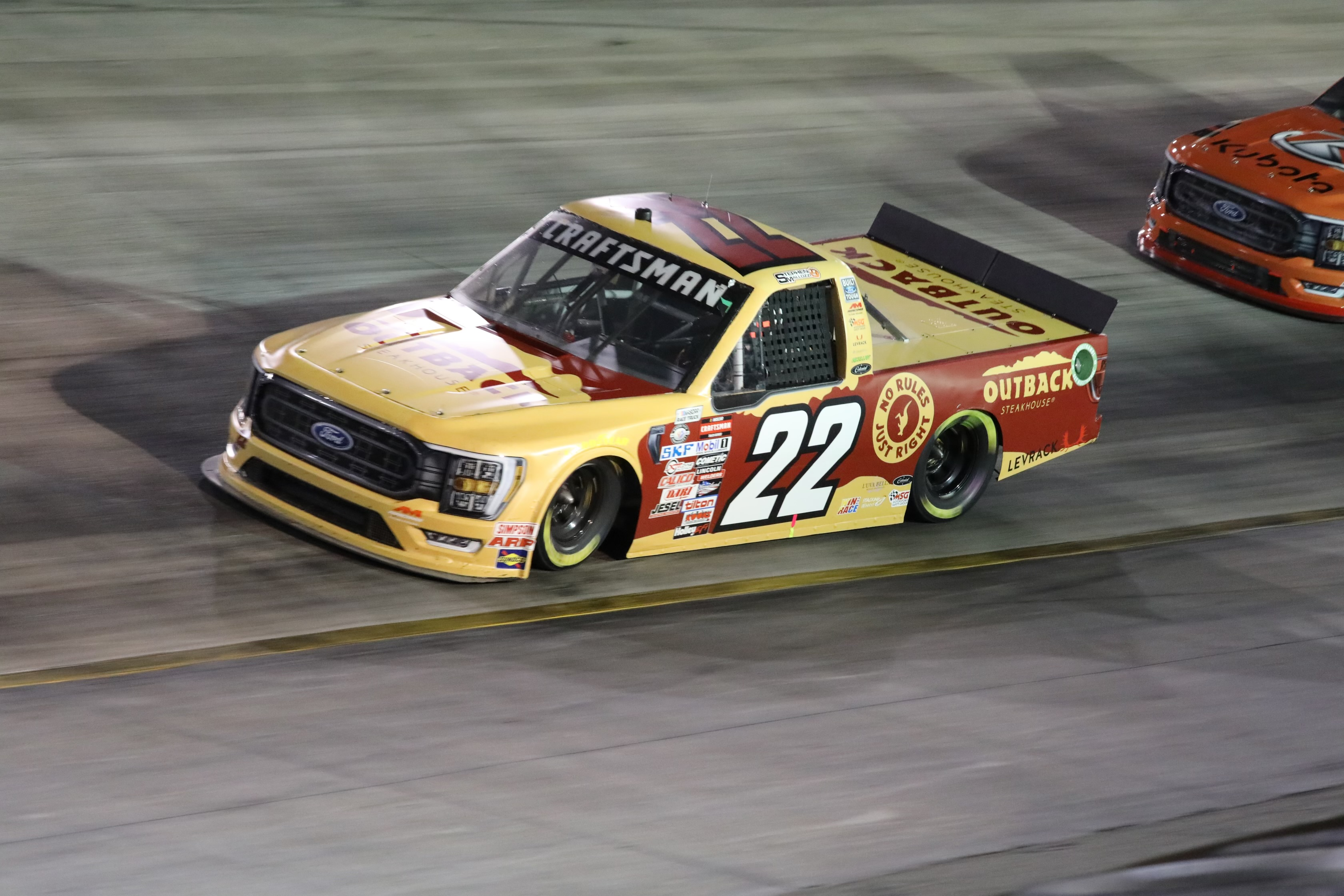
Mallozzi's Outback truck in 2023

In 2012, Outback Steakhouse became a sponsor of Ryan Newman and the No. 39 Chevrolet for Stewart–Haas Racing in the NASCAR Sprint Cup Series. In their first race as sponsor, Newman won the 2012 Goody's Fast Relief 500 at Martinsville Speedway. One of the promotions the company had with Newman was a free Bloomin' Onion on the Monday after a race in which Newman would finish in the top ten. Kevin Harvick took over Outback's sponsorship and promotion in 2014 for two races in their No. 4 after Newman left the team. The company was on Harvick's car from 2014 until 2018, including his championship in 2014, and in 2019 and until the COVID-19 pandemic in 2020, the steakhouse was a personal sponsor which kept the Blooming Monday promotion around still. It ended after 2020. The company also sponsored future four-time Cup Series champion Jeff Gordon's No. 67 for the AC-Delco 200 in the Busch Series during the 1990 season.

In September 2023, Outback Steakhouse sponsored Stephen Mallozzi, who had previously worked as a server at the restaurant, for a NASCAR Craftsman Truck Series race at Bristol Motor Speedway.

Gallery
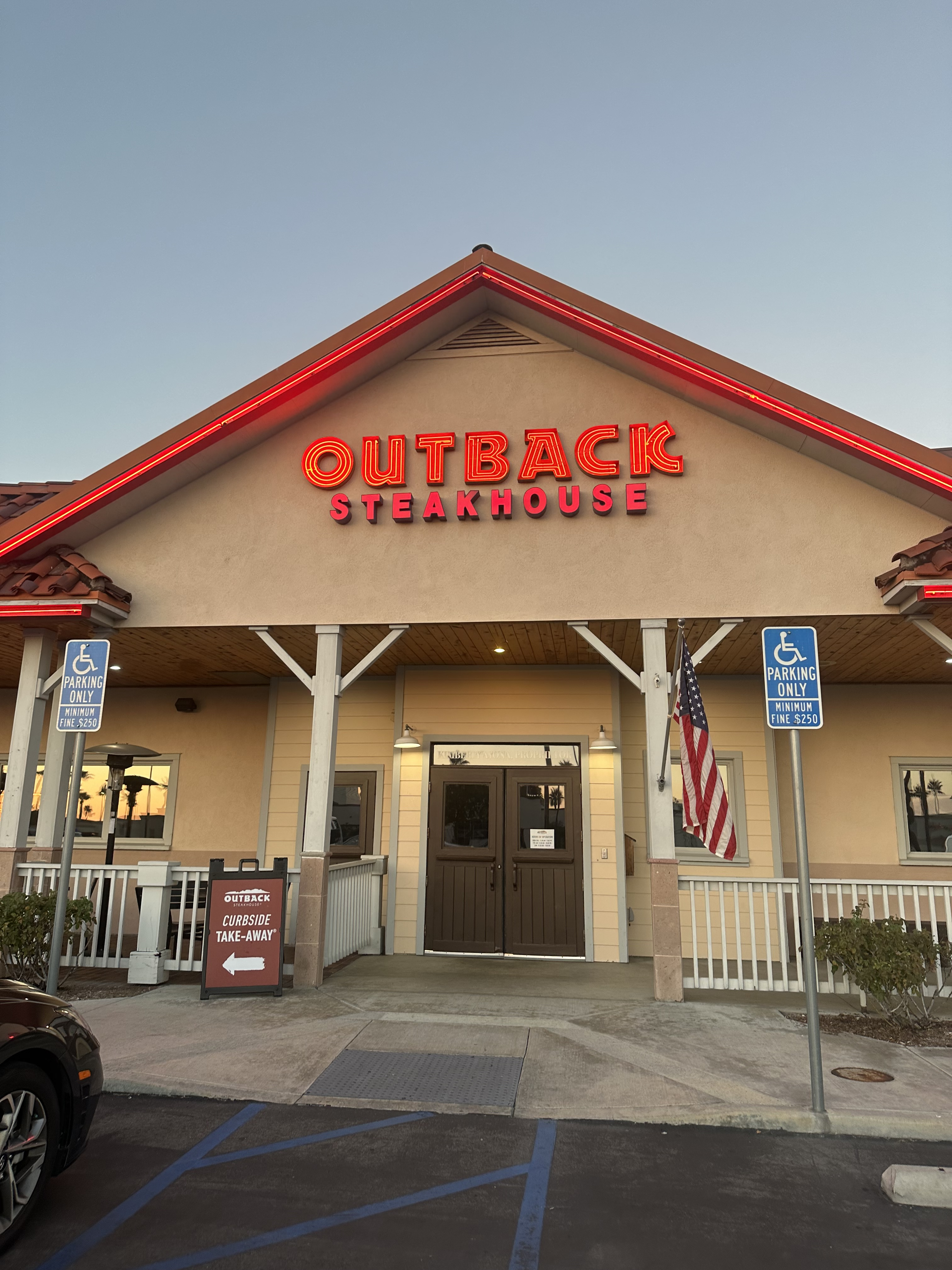
Original style restaurant in Lake Forest, California, September 2023 (permanently closed October 2026)

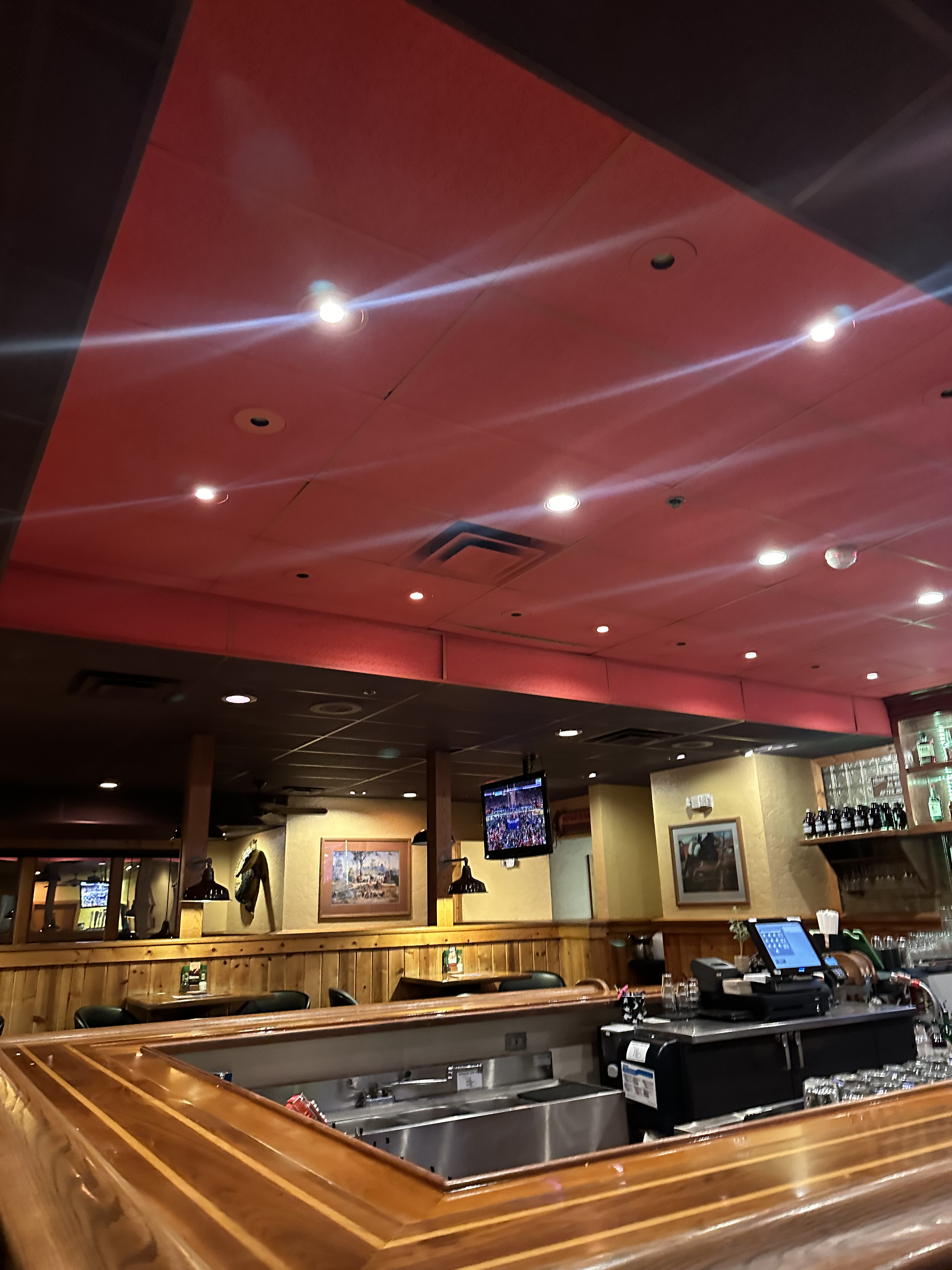
Interior, February 2024. Location was permanently closed in October 2026.

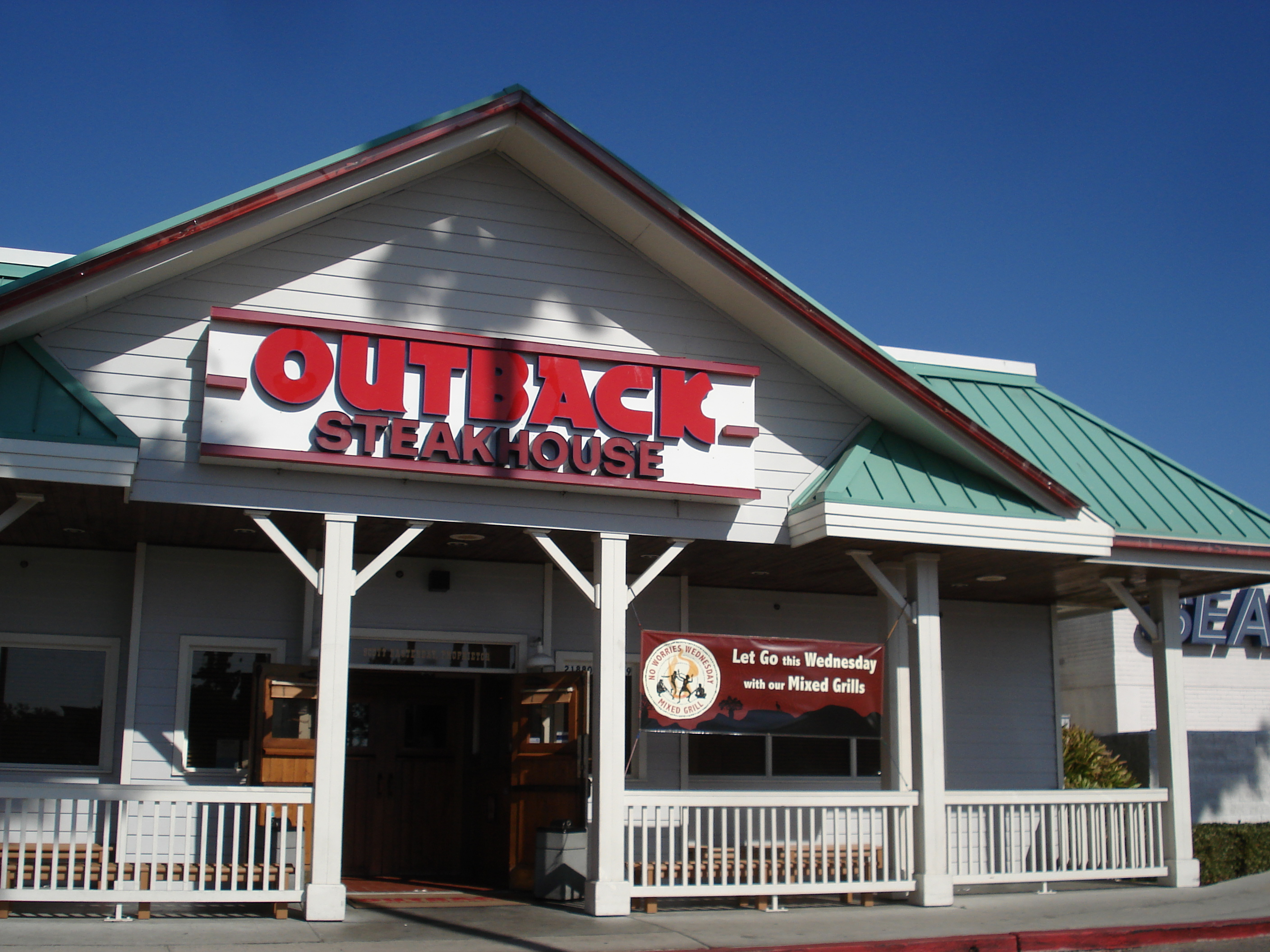
Outback restaurant at Del Amo Fashion Center in Torrance, California, in September 2007. This was relocated to the outdoor wing in 2018 and was demolished and replaced with Marshalls.

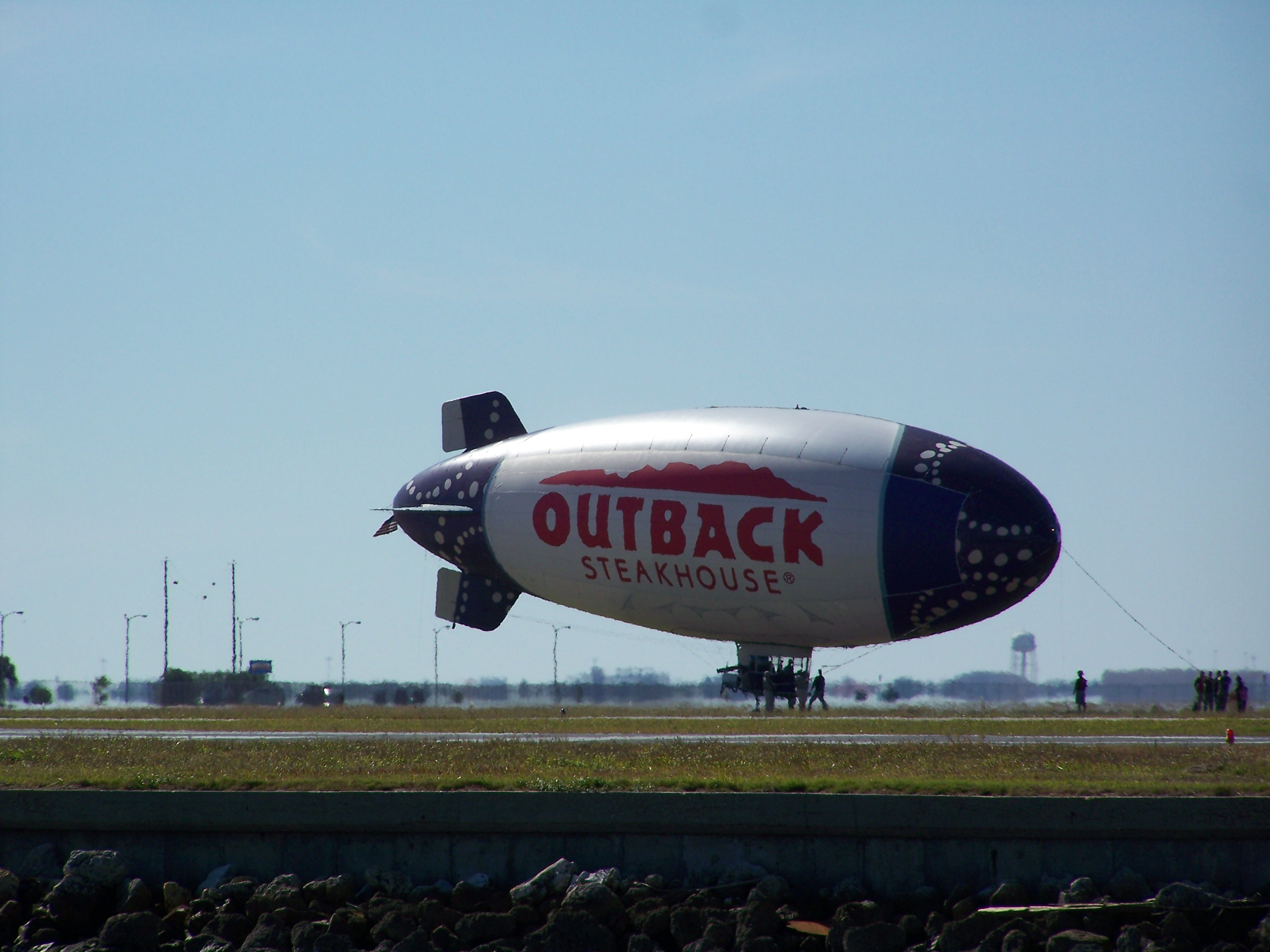
One of the two Outback blimps

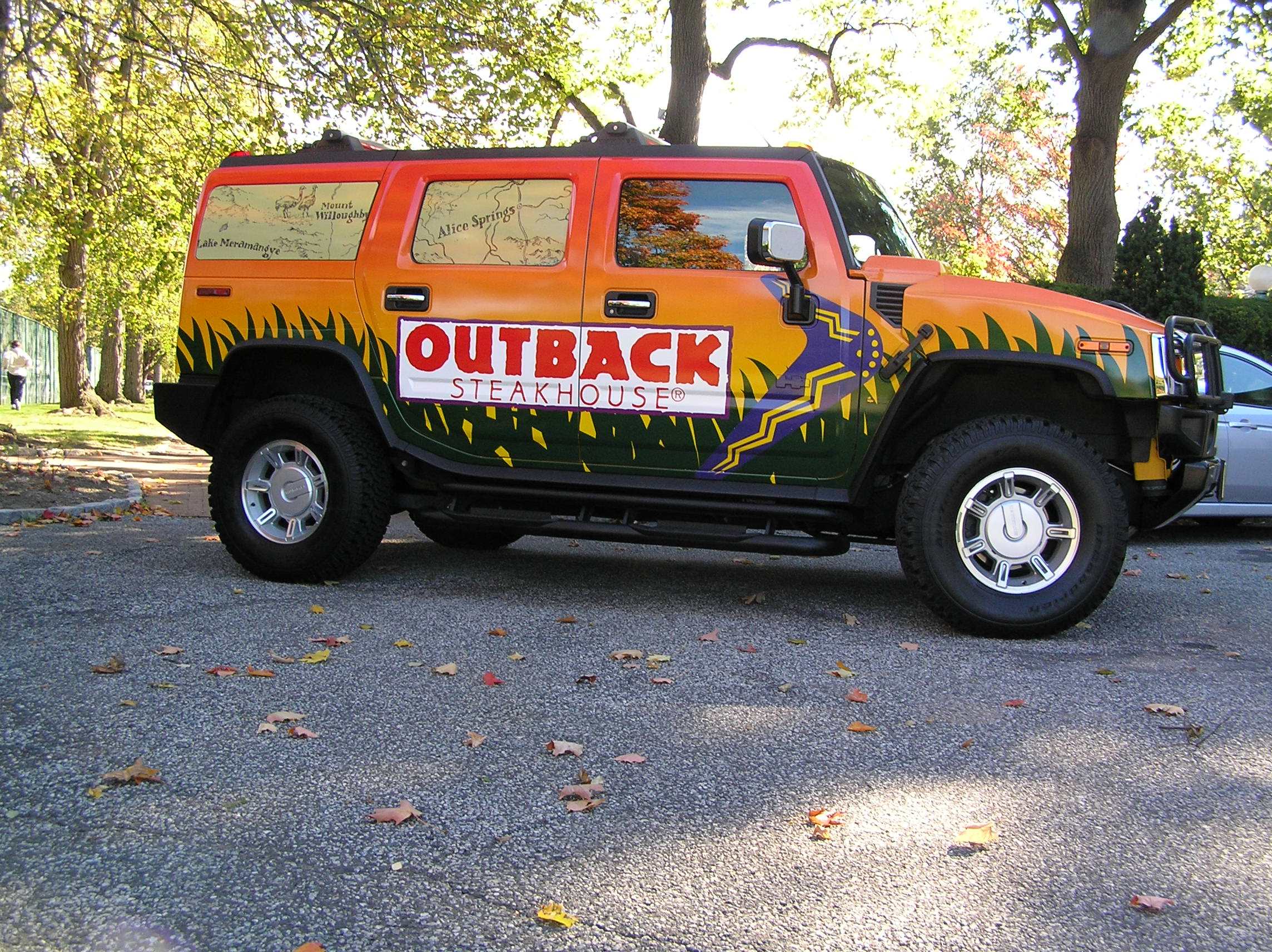
The Outback Steakhouse Hummer vehicle
