= Roy's =

American restaurant chain

- Type: Subsidiary
- Industry: Restaurant
- Founded: 1988; 38 years ago Honolulu, Hawaii, U.S.
- Founder: Roy Yamaguchi
- Headquarters: 13355 Noel Road, Suite 1645; Dallas, Texas, U.S. 75240
- Number of locations: 3 (2025)
- Key people: Roy Yamaguchi (Chef); Sunil Dharod (CEO); Deborah Hinson (President)
- Products: Hawaiian cuisine, Sushi, Seafood, Steakhouse
- Parent: United Ohana, LLC.
- Website: roysrestaurant.com

Roy's is an upscale American restaurant that specializes in Hawaiian and Japanese fusion cuisine, with a focus on sushi, seafood and steak. The chain was founded by James Beard Foundation Award Winner Roy Yamaguchi in 1988 in Honolulu, Hawaii. The concept was well received among critics upon inception. The concept has grown to include 21 Roy's restaurants in the continental United States, six in Hawaii, one in Japan and one in Guam.

Roy's is known best for its eclectic blend of Hawaiian, Japanese, and Classic French cuisine created by founder Roy Yamaguchi who was born in Tokyo, Japan, and spent his childhood visiting his grandparents who owned a tavern in Wailuku, Maui. Yamaguchi then graduated from the Culinary Institute of America where he received his formal culinary training and credits these factors to inspiring his unique culinary vision that is brought to life at Roy's.

Twenty mainland locations were owned and operated by Bloomin' Brands, Inc., until December 2014 when they were sold to United Ohana, LLC. The locations of Hawai'i and Pebble Beach, California, remain under original ownership.

In the last several years, multiple Roy's locations on the mainland have closed. Of the original 20 locations that United Ohana, LLC purchased, only three locations remain open: two in California, and one in Florida.

== See also ==
- List of restaurants in Hawaii
- List of seafood restaurants
