= Carrabba's Italian Grill =

American restaurant chain

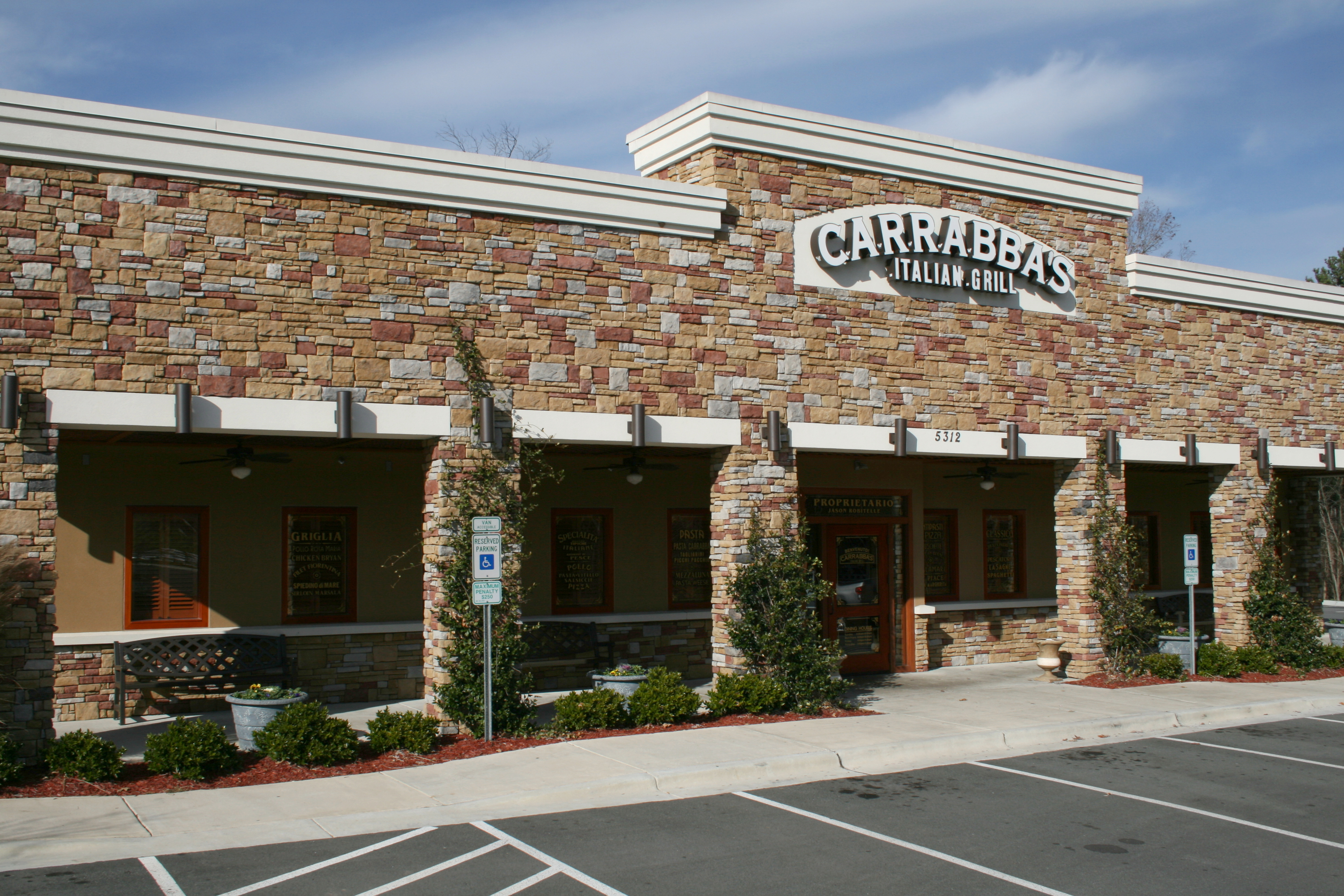
- A Carrabba's Italian Grill in Durham, North Carolina
- Type: Subsidiary
- Industry: Restaurant
- Genre: Casual dining
- Founded: 1986, in Houston, Texas, U.S.
- Founder: "Johnny" Charles Carrabba, III; Damian Mandola
- Headquarters: 2202 North West Shore Boulevard, Suite 500; Tampa, Florida, U.S. 33607
- Number of locations: 203 (2026)
- Area served: United States; Brazil; Canada
- Key people: Pat Hafner (president of Carrabba’s)
- Products: Italian-American cuisine; (pasta • pizza • chicken • seafood)
- Revenue: US$ 699.7 million (2022)
- Parent: Bloomin' Brands
- Website: www.carrabbas.com

Carrabba's Italian Grill (or simply Carrabba's) is an American restaurant chain featuring Italian-American cuisine. It is owned and operated by Bloomin' Brands, and headquartered in Tampa, Florida.

== History ==
The chain was founded in December 1986, by John Charles "Johnny" Carrabba III and his uncle Damian Mandola. Together, they opened the first restaurant on Kirby Drive in Houston, Texas. A second location followed at the intersection of Woodway and Voss Road, which was later expanded and renamed "Rosie Carrabba's" after Mandola's sister, Rose. Johnny Carrabba and his family retain ownership of both original locations.

In January 1993, under a joint venture with Outback Steakhouse, Inc. (the predecessor to Bloomin' Brands), 10 new Carrabba's locations were opened in Houston and Florida. Two years later, OSI acquired the rights to develop the Carrabba's chain nationwide. The partnership expanded into travel hubs in 2008 through an agreement with HMSHost to open a location at Tampa International Airport.

By 2013, Florida contained the highest concentration of Carrabba's restaurants in the United States, coinciding with the location of Bloomin' Brands' corporate headquarters. International expansion began in 2015 with the opening of "Abbraccio" in Brazil, followed by a 2020 entry into the Canadian market in Moncton, New Brunswick.

In 2021, Bloomin' Brands reached a royalty termination agreement to buy out the founders' remaining interests in the wider chain. As part of the agreement, the founders retained ownership of the two original Houston locations.

== Menu ==
Many of the recipes for the dishes on Carrabba's menu are those of Damian's mother, Grace, and his sister, Rose. These recipes appeared on the PBS cooking show Cucina Sicilia, hosted by Carrabba and Mandola.

One specific dish, Chicken Bryan, consists of an 8 oz grilled chicken breast topped with goat cheese, sun-dried tomatoes, and a basil lemon-butter sauce. It is named after the city of Bryan, Texas, where the Carrabba family settled.

Another dish, the Fettuccine Weesie, features fettuccine alfredo, mushooms, shrimp and a lemon-butter sauce. It is named after Johnny Carrabba's sister Mary Louise.
