= Bloomin' Brands =

Restaurant holding company that owns several American casual dining restaurant chains

Bloomin' Brands, Inc.
- Type: Public
- Traded as: Nasdaq: BLMN; Russell 2000 component
- Industry: Restaurant
- Founded: August 1988; 38 years ago, in Tampa, Florida, U.S.
- Founders: Robert D. Basham; Chris T. Sullivan; Trudy Cooper; Tim Gannon
- Headquarters: Tampa, Florida, U.S.
- Number of locations: 1,489 restaurants (2017)
- Area served: Worldwide
- Key people: Michael L. Spanos (CEO)
- Revenue: US$4.67 billion (2023)
- Number of employees: 87,000 (2023)
- Subsidiaries: Outback Steakhouse; Carrabba's Italian Grill; Bonefish Grill; Fleming's Prime Steakhouse & Wine Bar
- Website: Bloomin' Brands

Bloomin' Brands, Inc. is a restaurant holding company that owns several American casual dining restaurant chains. The company was established in 1988 in Tampa, Florida, where it is headquartered.

== History ==
The company was founded in August 1988 as Multi-Venture Partners, Inc. in Florida by Tim Gannon, Bob Basham, Trudy Cooper, and Chris Sullivan. In 1988 the first Outback Steakhouse was opened in Tampa, Florida. The company went public in 1991 as a 49-restaurant chain and changed its name to Outback Steakhouse, Inc. Carrabba's Italian Grill was launched in 1993. The company's international expansion began with opening the first Outback Steakhouse in Canada. Revenues for the company exceed $1 billion for the first time. In 1998, the first units of Roy's Restaurant, Fleming's Prime Steakhouse & Wine Bar, and Lee Roy Selmon's opened. Cheeseburger in Paradise was launched several years later, in 2002. The Wall Street Journal reported on November 7, 2006, that Bain Capital, Catterton Partners and founders Sullivan, Basham, and Gannon (collectively referred to as Kangaroo Holdings, Inc.), had reached an agreement to buy OSI Restaurant Partners Inc. for about $3 billion. On April 1, 2019 David Deno became Bloomin' Brands CEO replacing Elizabeth Smith. September 3, 2024, Michael L. Spanos replaced David Deno as CEO.

Before the company becoming OSI Restaurant Partners, LLC, Outback Steakhouse Inc. owned Paul Lee's Chinese Kitchen, Cheeseburger in Paradise, Lee Roy Selmon's, Bonefish Grill, Roy's, Carrabba's, Fleming's and Zazarac brands.

The company formerly held the Cheeseburger in Paradise and Lee Roy Selmon's restaurant concepts. OSI also opened Blue Coral Seafood & Spirits in 2006 and planned 15 locations. They had opened two in California: one at Newport Beach in Orange County, and a second in San Diego, until deciding to close in 2009.

On June 14, 2007, OSI Restaurant Partners completed a stock repurchase plan, and the company became privately held. In April 2012, OSI filed with the Securities and Exchange Commission to raise up to $300 million in an initial public offering.

On August 7, 2012, after their initial public offering, OSI Restaurant Partners was renamed Bloomin' Brands, named after the Bloomin' Onion, a menu item sold by Outback Steakhouse. The company began trading on NASDAQ under the ticker symbol "BLMN."

In August 2023, it was announced the New York-headquartered hedge fund, Starboard Value, had acquired a 5% stake in Bloomin' Brands for an undisclosed amount.

== Restaurant chains ==
As of 2021, chains that the company owns and/or operates include:

- Bonefish Grill
- Carrabba's Italian Grill
- Fleming's Prime Steakhouse & Wine Bar
- Outback Steakhouse

== Political contributions ==
Bloomin' Brands has a political action committee called the Bloomin' Brands, Inc. Political Action Committee which gives overwhelmingly (75-95% of the time) to conservative and Republican and occasionally Democratic candidates, typically those on Congressional committees overseeing its business sector. Bloomin' Brands, Inc. Political Action Committee was a PAC during the 2016 election. As of the most recent 2018 financial filing from the Federal Election Commission (FEC), the committee raised $334,000 and spent $301,000. During the 2017-18 period, as of the most recent financial filing from the Federal Election Commission (FEC), the committee contributed to a mix of Democrats and Republican candidates and committees, as well as specific business sector oriented PACS such as the National Restaurant Association (NRA) PAC.
