= Bonefish Grill =

American casual dining restaurant chain

- Type: Subsidiary
- Industry: Restaurant
- Genre: Casual dining
- Founded: January 15, 2000; 26 years ago, in St. Petersburg, Florida, U.S.
- Founder: Tim Curci; Chris Parker
- Headquarters: 2202 North West Shore Boulevard, Suite 500; Tampa, Florida, U.S. 33607
- Number of locations: 157 stores (2026)
- Key people: Elizabeth A. Smith (CEO and chairman of OSI); Dirk A. Montgomery (CFO and EVP of OSI); Jeff Carcara (president of Bonefish Grill)
- Products: American cuisine (seafood)
- Revenue: US$ 619 million (2017)
- Parent: Bloomin' Brands
- Website: www.bonefishgrill.com

Bonefish Grill is an American casual dining seafood restaurant chain owned and operated by Bloomin' Brands, headquartered in Tampa, Florida. The company was founded on January 15, 2000, in St. Petersburg, Florida by Tim Curci and Chris Parker.

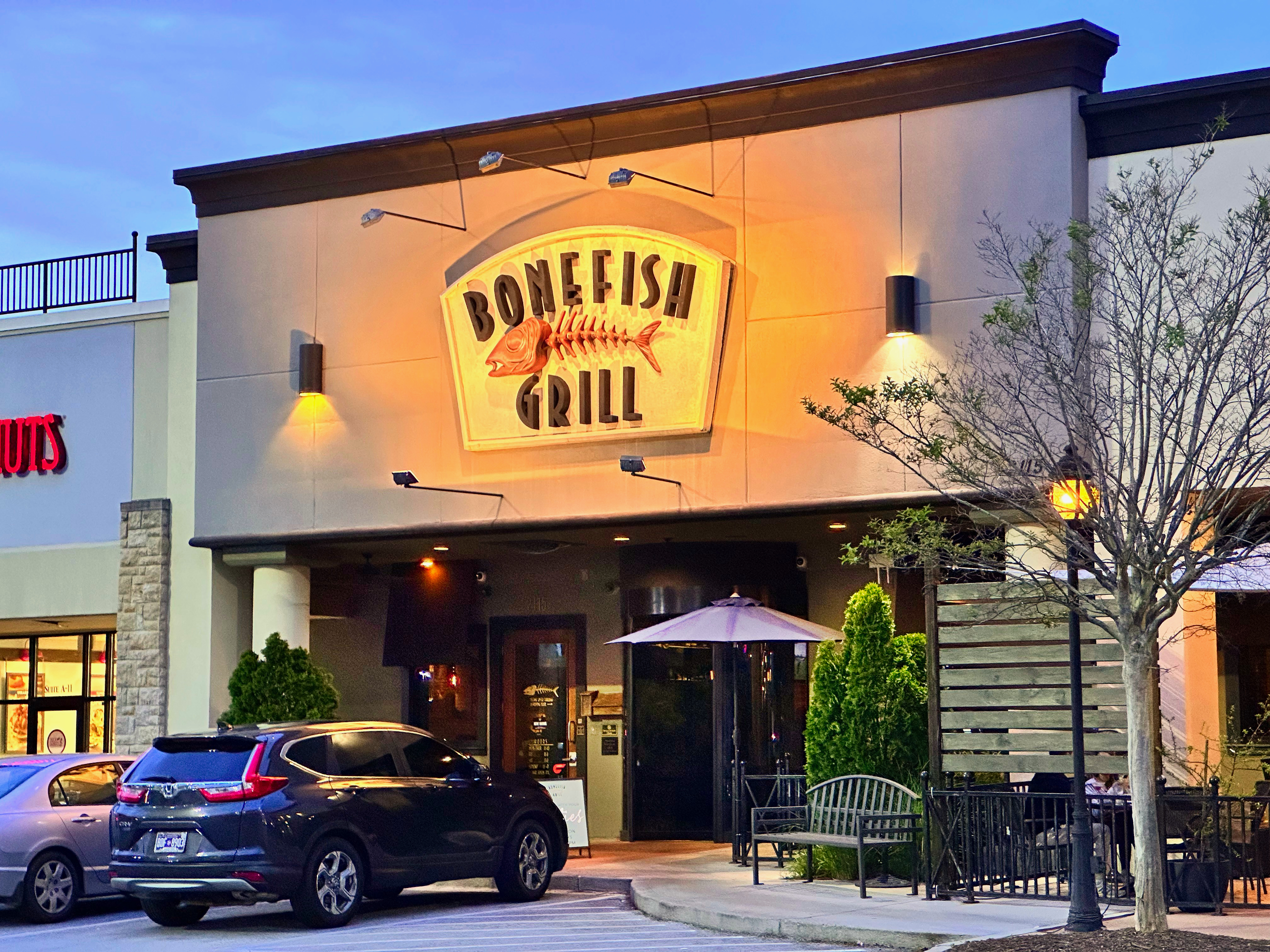
Bonefish Grill in Chattanooga, Tennessee

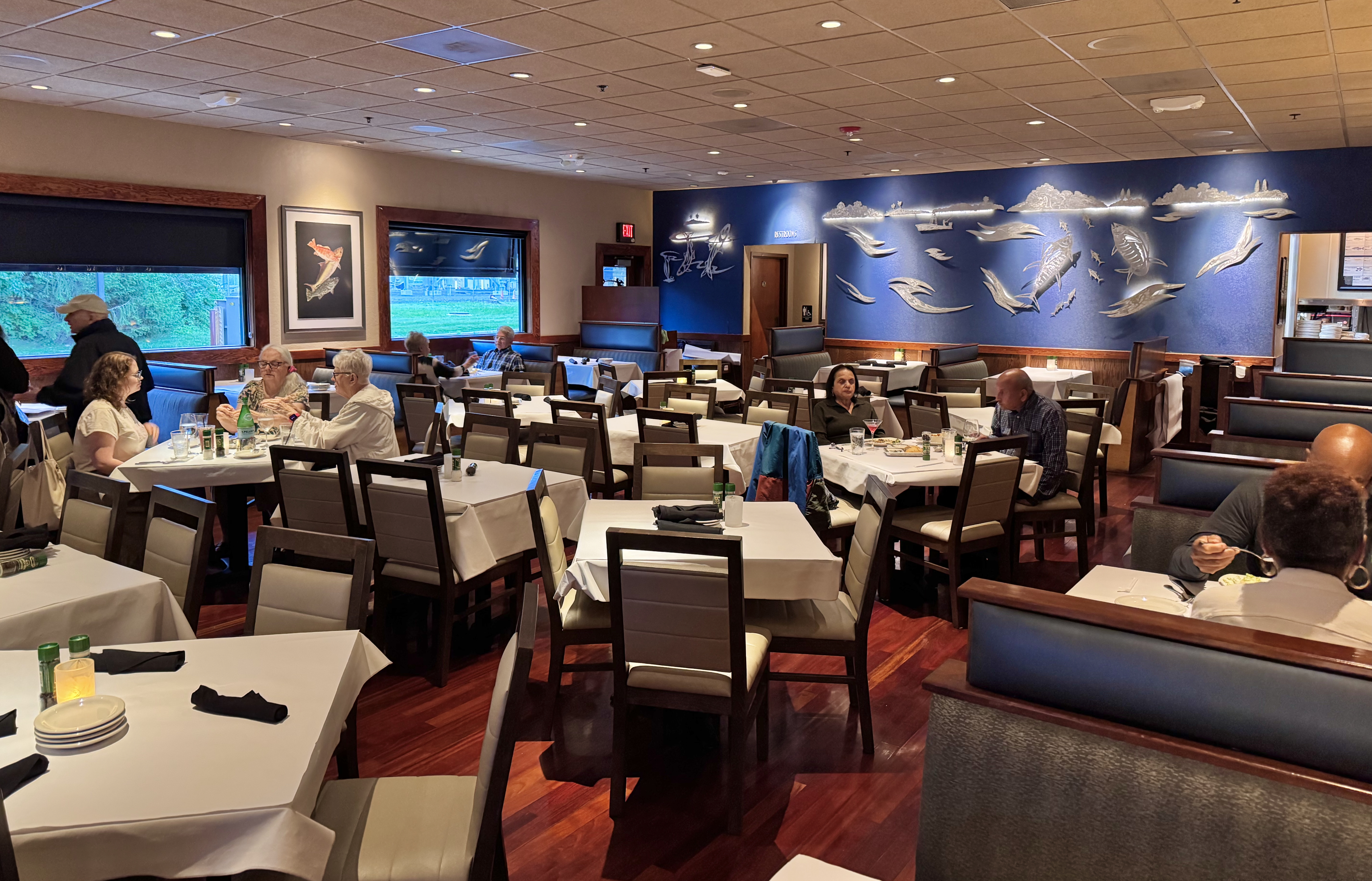
Bonefish Grill dining room in Marlton, New Jersey

Bloomin' Brands acquired Bonefish Grill on October 5, 2001. At the time, the company had three locations. In 2006, Bonefish Grill announced the opening of its 100th restaurant. As of January 2022, Bloomin' Brands had five franchised Bonefish Grill restaurants and 159 corporate-owned and operated Bonefish Grills across 28 states.

== Menu ==
Bonefish Grill restaurants are typically only open for dinner. The company is experimenting with full lunch service in some markets with specific lunch items not found on the dinner menu. Their menu focuses largely on wood-grilled fish, rotating through specialty dishes and drink offerings seasonally.

== See also ==
- List of casual dining restaurant chains
- List of seafood restaurants
