= Fleming's Prime Steakhouse & Wine Bar =

American steakhouse restaurant chain

- Type: Subsidiary
- Industry: Restaurant
- Genre: Steakhouse
- Founded: 1998; 28 years ago, in Newport Beach, California, U.S.
- Founder: Paul Fleming; Bill Allen
- Headquarters: 2202 N West Shore Blvd, Suite 500; Tampa, Florida, U.S. 33607
- Number of locations: 63 (2021)
- Area served: United States
- Key people: Elizabeth A. Smith (CEO and chairwoman of BBI); Kenny Beckman (CFO and EVP of OSI); Beth Scott (president of Fleming's)
- Products: American cuisine; (steak • seafood • chicken)
- Parent: Bloomin' Brands
- Website: flemingssteakhouse.com

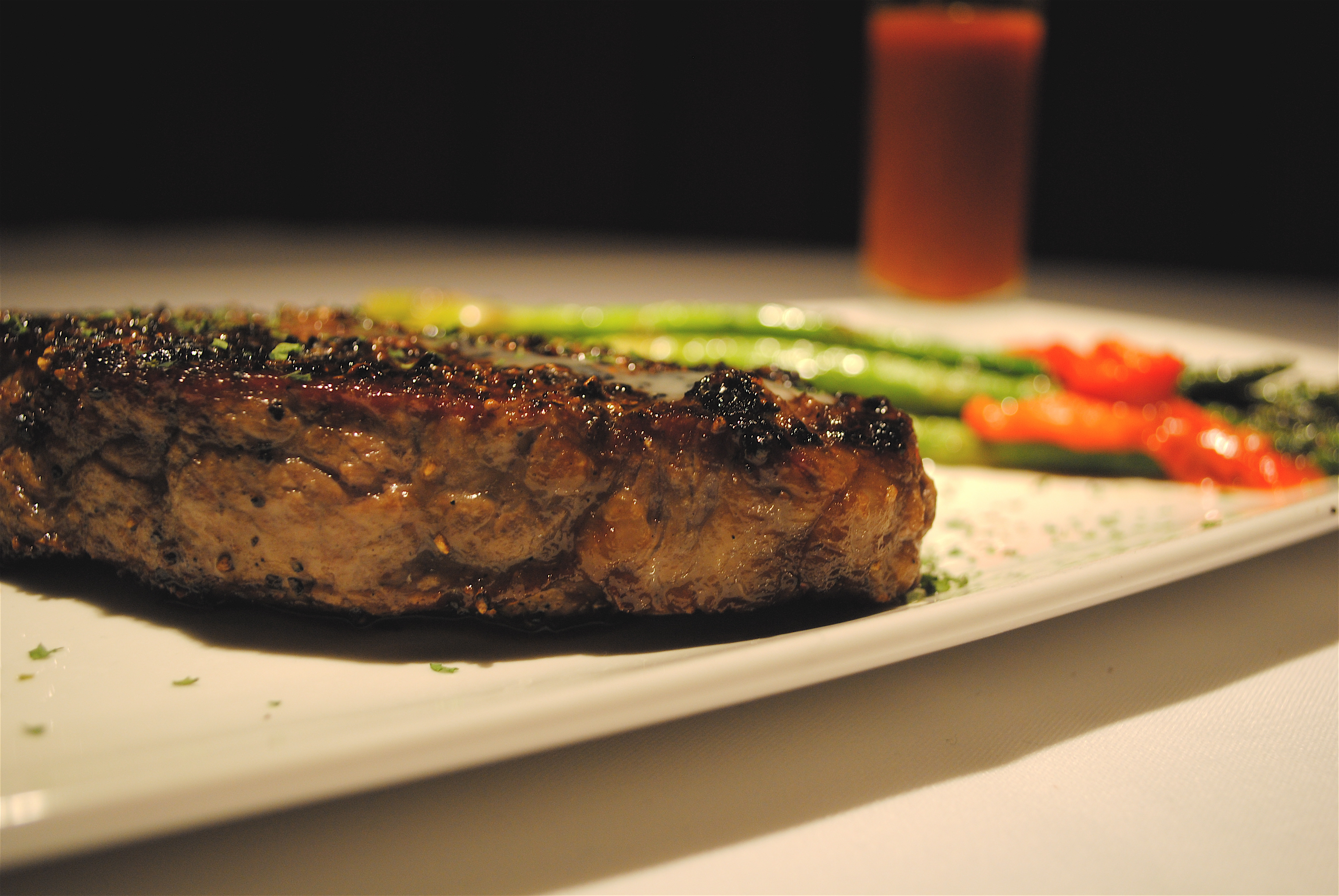
Peppercorn steak with F17 steak sauce at Fleming's Prime Steakhouse & Wine Bar

Fleming's Prime Steakhouse & Wine Bar (or simply Fleming's) is an American fine dining steakhouse restaurant chain owned and operated by Bloomin' Brands, headquartered in Tampa, Florida. In addition to steak and wine, they serve a variety of American cuisine associated with fine dining, such as calamari, chocolate desserts, crab, lobster, and other seasonal specials.

== History ==
Founded in 1998 by Paul Fleming and Bill Allen, Fleming's first location was in Newport Beach, California.

In 2020, Fleming's was one of the many restaurant chains impacted by the COVID-19 pandemic.

In 2024, Fleming’s officially added A5 Wagyu to 20 locations, with a pre-launch on National Wagyu Day, June 21st.

As of 2025, the company had 70 locations throughout 26 states and 1 in São Paulo, Brazil, all company-owned.
