= List of pizza franchises =

This is a list of pizza restaurant franchises. Franchising is the practice of the right to use a firm's successful business model and brand for a prescribed period of time.

== Pizza franchises ==
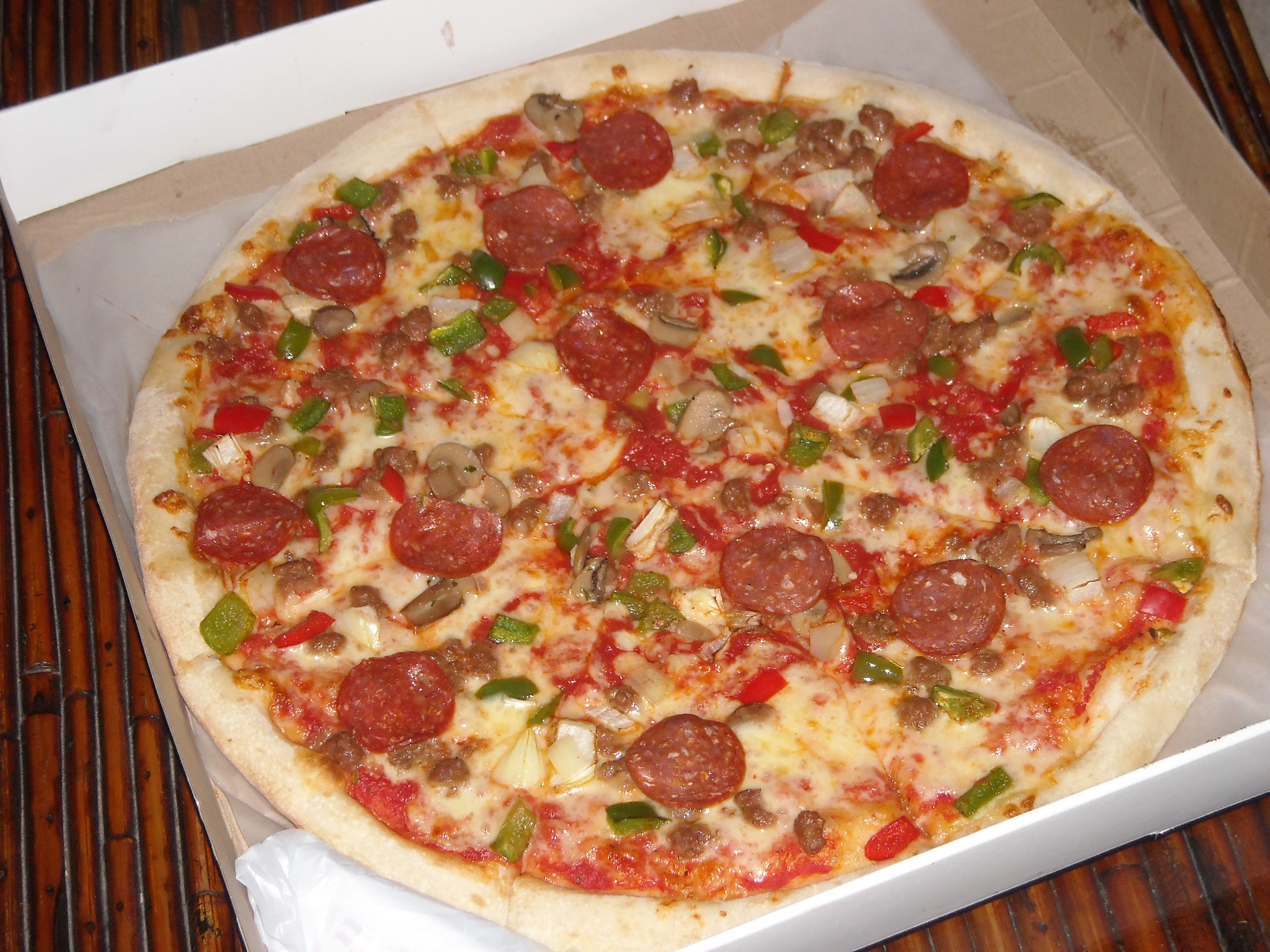
A Sbarro supreme pizza

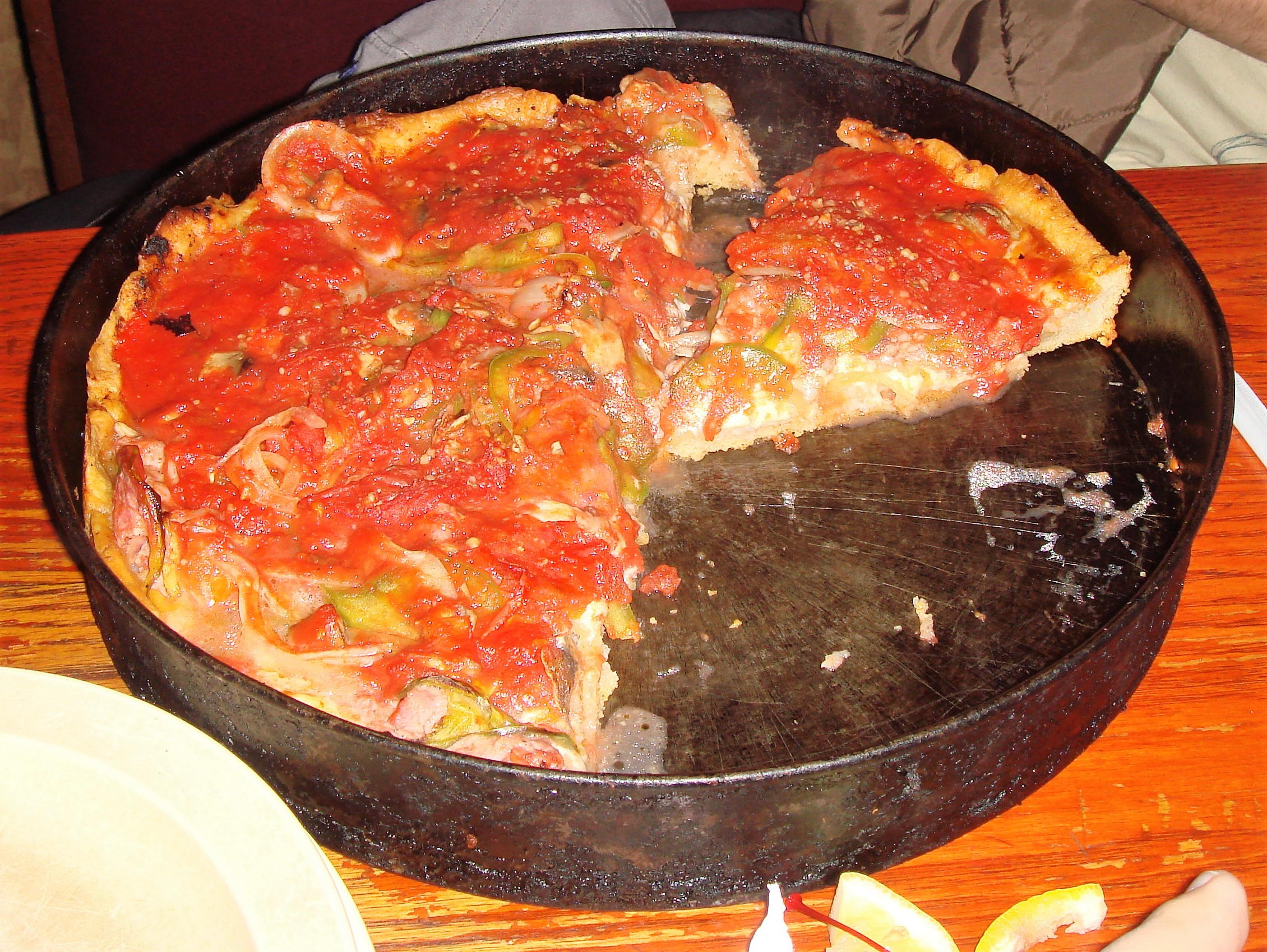
A Chicago-style deep dish pizza from the original Pizzeria Uno location

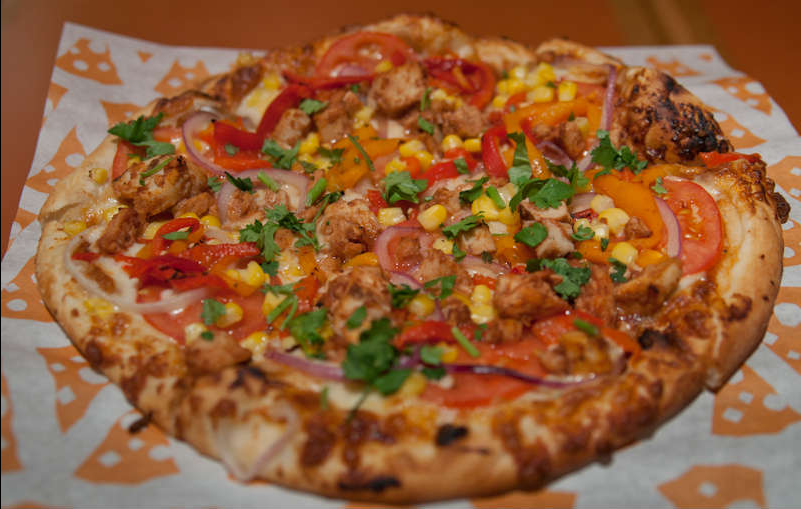
A barbecue chicken pizza from Zpizza

- 241 Pizza
- &pizza
- America's Incredible Pizza Company
- Apache Pizza
- Benedetti's Pizza
- Blackjack Pizza
- Blaze Pizza
- Boston Pizza
- California Pizza Kitchen
- Chuck E. Cheese
- Cicis
- Čili
- Cottage Inn Pizza
- Debonairs Pizza
- Dodo Pizza
- Domino's
- Donatos Pizza
- DoubleDave's Pizzaworks
- Eagle Boys
- East of Chicago Pizza
- Extreme Pizza
- Figaro's Pizza
- Four Star Pizza
- Fox's Pizza Den
- Giordano's
- Godfather's Pizza
- Greco Pizza Restaurant
- Greenwich Pizza
- Happy's Pizza
- Hungry Howie's Pizza
- Imo's Pizza
- Jet's Pizza
- Kotipizza
- LaRosa's Pizzeria
- Ledo Pizza
- Little Caesars
- Marco's Pizza
- Mazzio's
- Mellow Mushroom
- Mister Pizza
- MOD Pizza
- Monical's Pizza
- Mountain Mike's Pizza
- Mr. Gatti's Pizza
- Mr. Pizza
- New York Pizza
- The Original Italian Pie
- Papa Gino's
- Papa John's
- Papa Murphy's
- Peter Piper Pizza
- Pieology
- Pizza California
- Pizza Capers
- The Pizza Company
- Pizza Factory
- Pizza Fusion
- Pizza Haven
- Pizza Hut
- Pizza Inn
- Pizzaiolo (restaurant chain)
- Pizza-La
- Pizza Nova
- Pizza Pizza
- Pizza Ranch
- Roman's Pizza
- Rosati's
- Rossopomodoro
- Rotolo's Pizzeria
- Round Table Pizza
- Russo's New York Pizzeria
- Sandella's Flatbread Café
- Sbarro
- Shakey's Pizza
- ShowBiz Pizza Place
- Smokin' Joe's
- Straw Hat Pizza
- Telepizza
- Toppers Pizza
- Uncle Maddio's Pizza Joint
- Uno Pizzeria & Grill
- Vapiano
- Vocelli Pizza
- Yellow Cab Pizza
- Your Pie
- Zpizza

== By country ==
Pizza franchises by country:

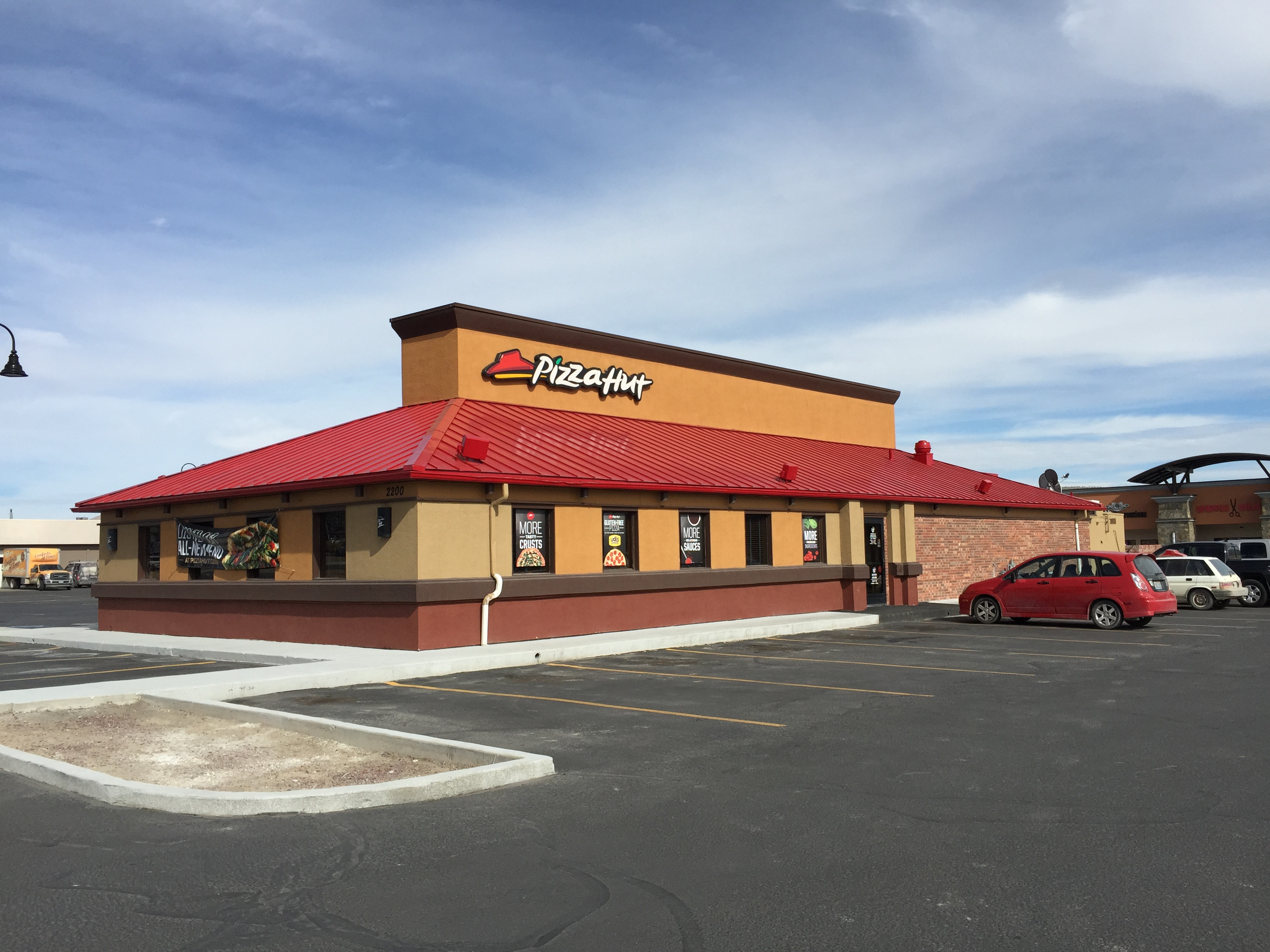
A Pizza Hut restaurant in Elko, Nevada

Countries with Pizza Hut restaurants

Countries with Domino's Pizza restaurants

Countries with Papa John's Pizza restaurants

Countries with Little Caesars restaurants

== See also ==
- List of franchises
- List of pizza chains
  - List of Canadian pizza chains
  - List of pizza chains of the United States
- Lists of restaurants
