= List of pizza chains of the United States =

This is a list of pizza chains of the United States. This list is limited to pizza chain restaurants that are based, headquartered or originated in the United States.

The distinction between national chains and primarily regional chains is only indicative of geographic footprint and not necessarily of the overall size of the chain. For example, Grimaldi's Pizzeria is a national chain with 47 locations, while Casey's is a Fortune 500 company with 2,500 locations despite almost exclusively serving the Midwestern United States.

== National pizza chains of the United States ==
- Blaze Pizza
- California Pizza Kitchen
- Chuck E. Cheese
- Cicis
- Domino's Pizza
- Godfather's Pizza
- Grimaldi's Pizzeria
- Hungry Howie's Pizza
- Hunt Brothers Pizza
- Jet's Pizza
- Little Caesars
- Marco's Pizza
- Mellow Mushroom
- MOD Pizza
- Old Chicago
- Papa John's Pizza
- Papa Murphy's
- Pizza Hut
- Pizza Studio
- Sbarro

== Primarily regional pizza chains of the United States ==
- &pizza (Mid-Atlantic)
- America's Incredible Pizza Company (Missouri & Oklahoma)
- Arni's Restaurant (Indiana)
- Aurelio's Pizza (Illinois & Indiana)
- Azzip Pizza (Indiana)
- Bearno's (Kentucky)
- Bertucci's (Massachusetts)
- Big Mama's & Papa's Pizzeria (Southern California)
- Big Mario's Pizza (Seattle)
- Blackjack Pizza (Colorado)
- Buddy's Pizza (Michigan)
- Casey's (Midwest)
- Cassano's Pizza King (Dayton, Ohio area)
- Cottage Inn Pizza (Michigan & Ohio)
- Dion's (New Mexico)
- Donatos Pizza (Ohio)
- DoubleDave's Pizzaworks (Texas)
- East of Chicago Pizza (Ohio)
- Extreme Pizza (Central California)
- Fellini's Pizza (Georgia)
- Figaro's Pizza (Oregon)
- Fox's Pizza Den (Pennsylvania)
- Frank Pepe Pizzeria Napoletana (Connecticut)
- Gino's East (Chicago)
- Gino's Pizza and Spaghetti (Appalachia)
- Giordano's Pizzeria (Illinois)
- Giovanni's Pizza (Kentucky/KYOVA)
- Glass Nickel Pizza Company (Wisconsin)
- Grotto Pizza (Delaware)
- Happy Joe's (Midwest)
- Happy's Pizza (Michigan & Ohio)
- Hideaway Pizza (Oklahoma, Texas, & Arkansas)
- Home Run Inn (Chicago)
- Ian's Pizza (Wisconsin)
- Imo's Pizza (Missouri & Illinois)
- Jerry's Subs & Pizza (Maryland)
- John's Incredible Pizza Company (California)
- LaRosa's Pizzeria (Ohio & Kentucky)
- Ledo Pizza (Mid-Atlantic)
- Lou Malnati's Pizzeria (Chicago)
- Mad Pizza
- Marion's Piazza (Dayton, Ohio area)
- Mazzio's (Oklahoma)
- Monical's Pizza (Midwest)
- Moto Pizza (Seattle)
- Mountain Mike's Pizza (Western U.S.)
- Mr. Gatti's Pizza (Southern U.S.)
- Noble Roman's (Indiana)
- Pagliacci Pizza (Seattle area)
- Papa Gino's (New England)
- Pat's Pizza (Maine)
- Patxi's Chicago Pizza (San Francisco Bay Area)
- Peter Piper Pizza (Southwest)
- Pie Five (Southern U.S.)
- Pieology (California)
- Pietro's Pizza (Oregon)
- Pizza Boli's (Mid-Atlantic)
- Pizza Factory (Western U.S.)
- Pizza Fusion (Florida, New Jersey, & Virginia)
- Pizza Inn (Southern U.S.)
- Pizza Lucé (Minnesota)
- Pizza My Heart (San Francisco Bay Area)
- Pizza Patrón (Texas)
- Pizza Ranch (Midwest)
- Pizza Schmizza (Oregon)
- Regina Pizzeria (New England)
- Rocky Rococo (Midwest)
- Rosati's Authentic Chicago Pizza (Midwest)
- Rotolo's Pizzeria (Southern U.S.)
- Round Table Pizza (West Coast)
- Russo's New York Pizzeria (Texas)
- Sal's Pizza (New England)
- Sammy's Pizza (Minnesota)
- Sarpino's Pizzeria (Midwest)
- Sexy Pizza
- Shakey's Pizza (West Coast)
- Sir Pizza (Pizza King)(Midwest & Southeast)
- Sizzle Pie (Oregon)
- Snappy Tomato Pizza (Kentucky)
- Straw Hat Pizza (California)
- Timber Pizza (Mid-Atlantic)
- Toppers Pizza (Midwest)
- Two Boots (New York City)
- Uncle Maddio's Pizza Joint (Southeast)
- Uno Pizzeria & Grill (Midwest, Northeast, Mid-Atlantic, and Florida)
- Upper Crust Pizzeria (Boston area)
- Valentino's (Nebraska)
- Via Tribunali (Seattle)
- Vocelli Pizza (Pennsylvania)
- We, the Pizza (Washington, D.C. and Arlington, Virginia)
- Your Pie (Southeast)
- Zachary's Chicago Pizza (California) (San Francisco Bay Area)
- zpizza (California)

== Former pizza chains ==
- Discovery Zone
- Eatza Pizza
- ShowBiz Pizza Place
- Pizza Haven
- The Brothers Three

== See also ==
- List of pizzerias in New York City
- List of pizza chains
- List of pizza franchises
- List of restaurant chains
  - List of restaurant chains in the United States
- Lists of restaurants
