= Arni's Restaurant =

Pizzeria chain in Indiana

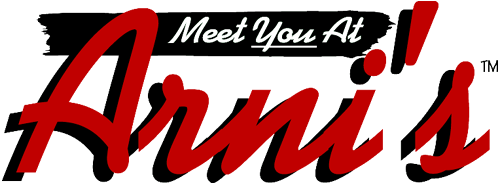
- Company type: Restaurant
- Industry: Restaurant
- Founded: 1965; 61 years ago
- Headquarters: Lafayette, Indiana
- Key people: Brad Cohen, Vice President; Kurt Cohen, Vice President
- Products: Pizza
- Website: www.meetyouatarnis.com

Arni's Restaurant is a chain of pizzerias with locations throughout the U.S. state of Indiana.

== History ==
The first Arni's opened at Market Square Shopping Center in Lafayette, Indiana, in 1965, after its founder purchased an existing Pizza King franchise and converted it to his own namesake, and was named for its founder, restaurateur Arni Cohen. The restaurant, originally designed to seat 120, expanded several times and now seats approximately 500.

The restaurant's success led to the establishment of several smaller Arni's locations in surrounding communities, emphasizing carryout service. A second full-service location opened in the summer of 1988. As of 2023, the chain currently consists of 19 company-owned and franchised locations.

Arni Cohen was a board member of the Indiana Restaurant Association and was elected to the Indiana Restaurant Association Hall of Fame in 2002. He died February 7, 2002, at the age of 69; his sons Brad and Kurt now lead the company.

Arni's was added to the Pizza Hall of Fame on August 1, 2017.

== See also ==
- List of pizza chains of the United States
