= Pizza Schmizza =

American fast food chain

- Industry: Fast food restaurants
- Founded: Oregon on August 6, 1993; 32 years ago
- Headquarters: Salem, Oregon
- Number of locations: 11 restaurants
- Key people: Andre Jehan, Roger Jehan
- Products: Pizza, salads, soft drinks, beer
- Website: www.schmizza.com and [www.schmizzapublichouse.com]

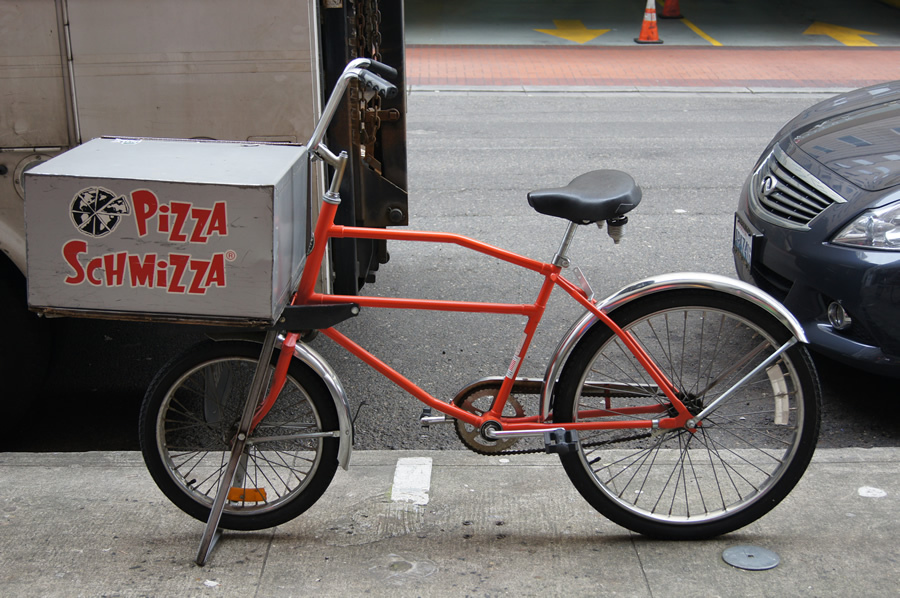
A Pizza Schmizza delivery bicycle

Pizza Schmizza is an American pizza franchise with 9 locations throughout the Portland, Oregon area, and two in southern Oregon. Pizza Schmizza primarily sells thin crust pizza by the slice.

== History ==
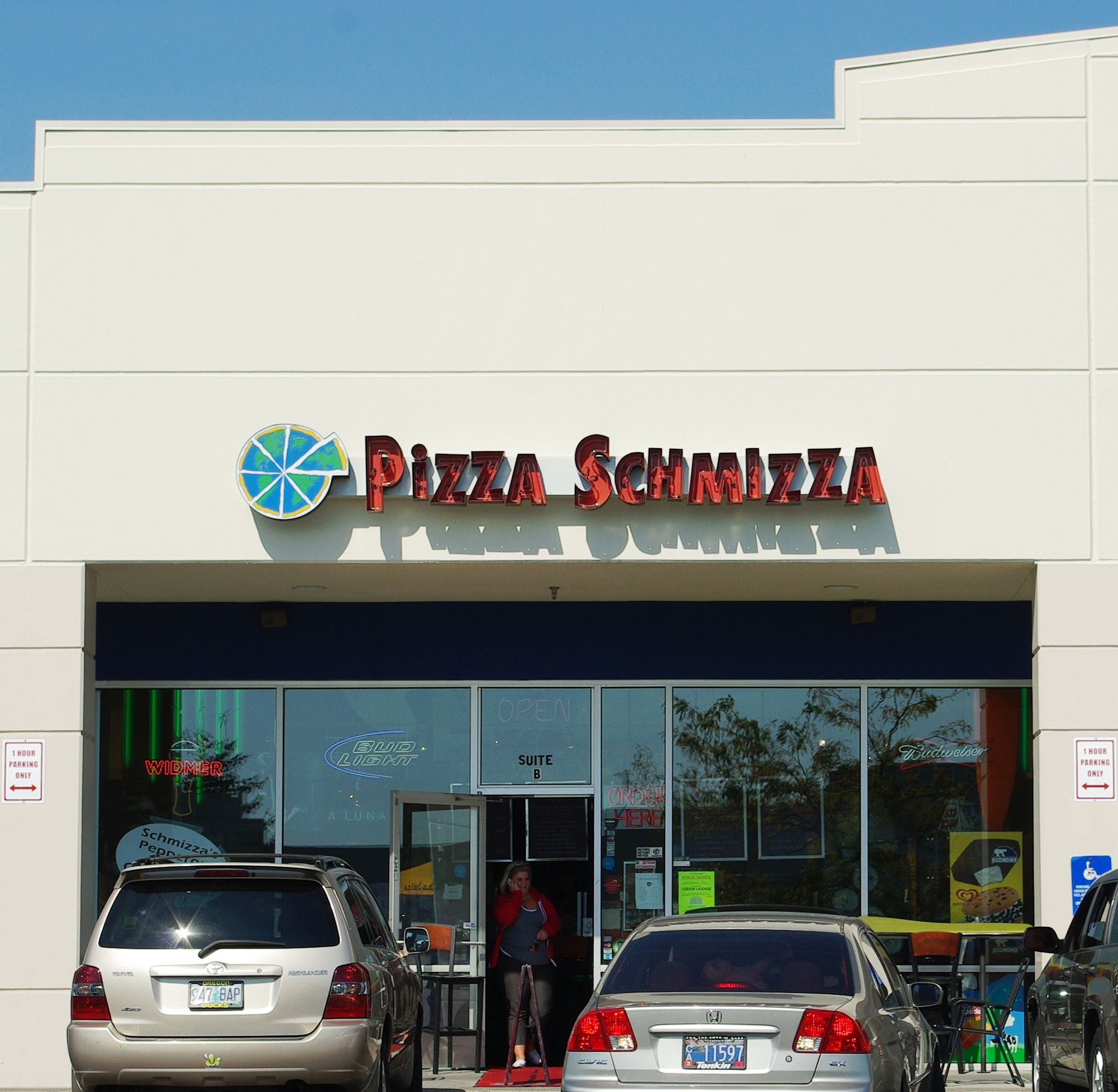
A location in Hillsboro, Oregon

Pizza Schmizza opened its first location on August 6, 1993 in downtown Hillsboro, Oregon by brothers Andre and Roger Jehan.

In 2003, Pizza Schmizza received complaints from an advertising watchdog group for hiring homeless men to hold signs bearing the slogan "Pizza Schmizza paid me to hold this sign instead of asking for money". Owner Andre Jehan countered that this was a way to help the homeless and that the homeless found the arrangement a positive experience.

Pizza Schmizza received a media award from the Oregon Department of Human Services for support of a program discouraging underage alcohol consumption in 2004.

In 2020 amid the COVID-19 pandemic, the Southwest Montgomery Schmizza location received media attention for offering a special which included a roll of toilet paper with every order. The promotion coincided with a national toilet paper shortage that resulted from supply chain disruptions caused by COVID-19.

=== Acquisition by Figaro's Pizza ===
After CEO Doug Wetter was unable to do his day-to-day job with Pizza Schmizza, the company went into talks with Figaro's Pizza about selling the company. On March 31, 2008, Pizza Schmizza and Figaro's Pizza completed a deal for Figaro's to acquire Pizza Schmizza. Figaro's subsequently spun off the business (December 2014), and the two companies are no longer related.

== Related Restaurants ==
Schmizza International, the owners of the Pizza Schmizza brand, have opened other restaurants in the Portland area including Bethany Public House and Schmizza Public House (a franchise intended to be an upscale version of Pizza Schmizza).

== See also ==
- List of pizza chains of the United States
- "Spare Parts" 2015 movie with product placement in SB Hotel scene
