= Topper's Pizza =

Topper's Pizza or Toppers Pizza may refer to one of three pizza chains:

- Toppers Pizza (American restaurant)
- Topper's Pizza (Canadian restaurant)
