= Rotolo's Pizzeria =

Restaurant franchise based in Baton Rouge, Louisiana, U.S.

Rotolo’s Pizzeria
- Type: Private
- Industry: Restaurant franchise
- Founded: 1996; 30 years ago
- Headquarters: Baton Rouge, Louisiana, U.S.
- Key people: Mitch Rotolo, Sr, Mitch Rotolo, Jr
- Products: Pizza, Calzones, Pastas, Sandwiches, Burgers, Wraps, Buffalo Wings, Salads, Desserts
- Website: rotolos.com

Rotolo's Pizzeria is an American pizza restaurant chain that was established in 1996 in Baton Rouge, Louisiana as a single pizzeria. It operates as both company-owned stores and franchises under the banner of Rotolo's Pizzeria and Rotolo's Craft and Crust, with 38 locations in 9 states. Its headquarters are in Baton Rouge, Louisiana.

== Details ==
=== Rotolo's Pizzeria ===
Rotolo's Pizzeria specializes in pizza, but they also serve calzones, pastas, sandwiches, wraps, buffalo wings, salads, appetizers, and desserts. The restaurants offer a wine and beer selection, with beers on tap, and in bottles and cans. The pizzera's offer a casual Italian restaurant atmosphere.

=== Rotolo's Craft and Crust ===
Rotolo's Craft and Crust specializes in specialty and craft pizza, but they also serve calzones, pastas, sandwiches, hamburgers, wraps, buffalo wings, soups, salads, appetizers, and desserts. The restaurants offer a craft cocktail and beer selection, with beers on tap, and in bottles and cans plus an upgraded wine selection. The restaurants offer a more upscale casual feel with an expanded bar.

== History ==
Rotolo's Pizzeria opened in Baton Rouge, Louisiana in 1996 near the campus of Louisiana State University in an area called Tigerland. The company first expanded with both company-owned stores and franchises within Baton Rouge and different areas of Louisiana.

In 2016, Rotolo's developed a new concept and brand called Rotolo's Craft and Crust. It offers an upgraded menu with artisan ingredients, cured meats, and other items. Each location has an upscale casual feel with a unique bar and the menu has new pizza offerings such as Chicago-style and deep-dish pizzas along with upgraded craft beer, cocktail and wine offerings. The craft and crust name comes from the upgraded offerings and is considered the defining part of the brand.

In 2018, at the World Pizza Championships, Rotolo's medaled winning three of five honors in the Pizza Triathlon (gold), Fastest Dough Stretch (gold), and Fastest Box Folding (silver).

With both the Rotolo's Pizzeria and Rotolo's Craft and Crust brands, the restaurants have expanded from Louisiana to Texas, Alabama, Tennessee, Florida, Arkansas, Mississippi, South Carolina, and Colorado.

== See also ==
- List of restaurant chains in the United States
- List of pizza chains of the United States
- List of franchises
- List of pizza franchises
