= Moto Pizza =

Chain of pizzerias in the U.S. state of Washington

Restaurant information
- Established: 2021
- Owners: Lee Kindell; Nancy Gambin
- Location: Seattle; Edmonds, Washington, United States
- Website: xoxomoto.com

Moto Pizza is a small chain of pizzerias based in Seattle, in the U.S. state of Washington. The business has operated in West Seattle, Belltown, and Edmonds, and at T-Mobile Park.

== Description ==
Moto Pizza is a small chain of restaurants serving Detroit-style pizza; the business has operated in West Seattle, Belltown, and Edmonds, and at T-Mobile Park in SoDo. Another location is planned for Bellingham, Washington.

=== Menu ===
Many of the pizzas use Filipino ingredients; among toppings are lechon kawali with chimichurri, as well as Dungeness crab with lemon and dill. The Kissd has pepperoni, sausage, cheese, and tomato sauce with spicy honey, and the Root has mushrooms, black olives, onion, tomato sauce, and a balsamic glaze. The Mr. Pig has pork belly and calamansi lime sauce. Moto also offers multiple flavors of soft serve.

== History ==
Moto Pizza opened in 2021. Lee Kindell and Nancy Gambin are co-owners.

The Belltown location opened in 2023 and features robot assistance. Moto began serving five varieties of pizza by the slice (Cheese, Kissd, Moto Pepperoni, Mr. Pig, and Root) at T-Mobile Park in 2023.

Moto received a $1.85 million investment in December 2023. A location is planned to open in Bellingham, as of 2024.

== Reception ==
In 2023, Moto ranked number 41 on Yelp's list of the 100 best pizza restaurants in the U.S.

== See also ==
- List of pizza chains of the United States
- List of restaurant chains in the United States
