= Big Mario's Pizza =

Pizza restaurant chain in Seattle, Washington, U.S.

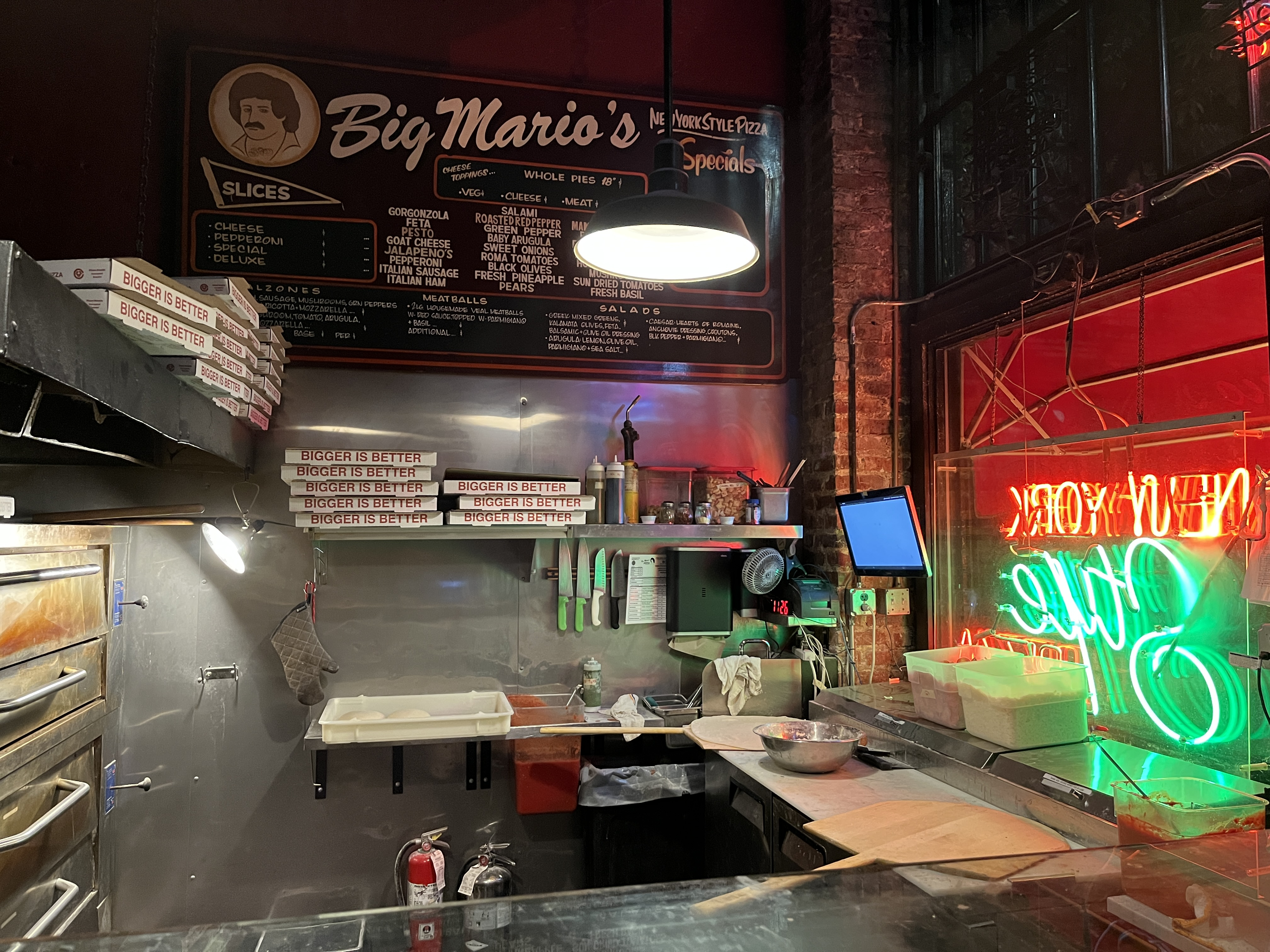
- Interior of the Capitol Hill restaurant, 2022

Restaurant information
- Food type: Italian (pizza)
- Location: Seattle, King, Washington, United States
- Website: bigmariosnewyorkpizza.com

Big Mario's Pizza is a pizza restaurant chain with three locations in Seattle, in the U.S. state of Washington.

== Description ==
Big Mario's Pizza is a restaurant chain with locations in Capitol Hill, Fremont, and Lower Queen Anne. The business serves New York–style pizza by the slice and whole pie, with combinations such as macaroni and cheese and potato and pesto, as well as Sicilian pizza. The Mai Tai with has Italian ham and pineapple and the Pear Gorgonzola is a vegetarian option. Big Mario's has also offered holiday specials, such as The Grinch for Christmas, which has pesto, pepperoni, and jalapeños.

Thrillist says, "There aren't many places in Seattle where you can slug an Olde English 40 and bask in the glory of true New York–style pizza, but Big Mario's is one of them. Located in Capitol Hill, this is one of the best spots for quality, thin-crust pie. Hipsters flock to Mario's for its retro style and late-night deals."

== History ==
Team members and owners have included Jason Lajuenesse, Mike McConnell, David Meinert, Jordan Neff, and Mario Vellotti. The Capitol Hill and Queen Anne locations opened in 2010 and 2015, respectively. In 2017, owners announced plans to open a location in Frelard.

== Reception ==
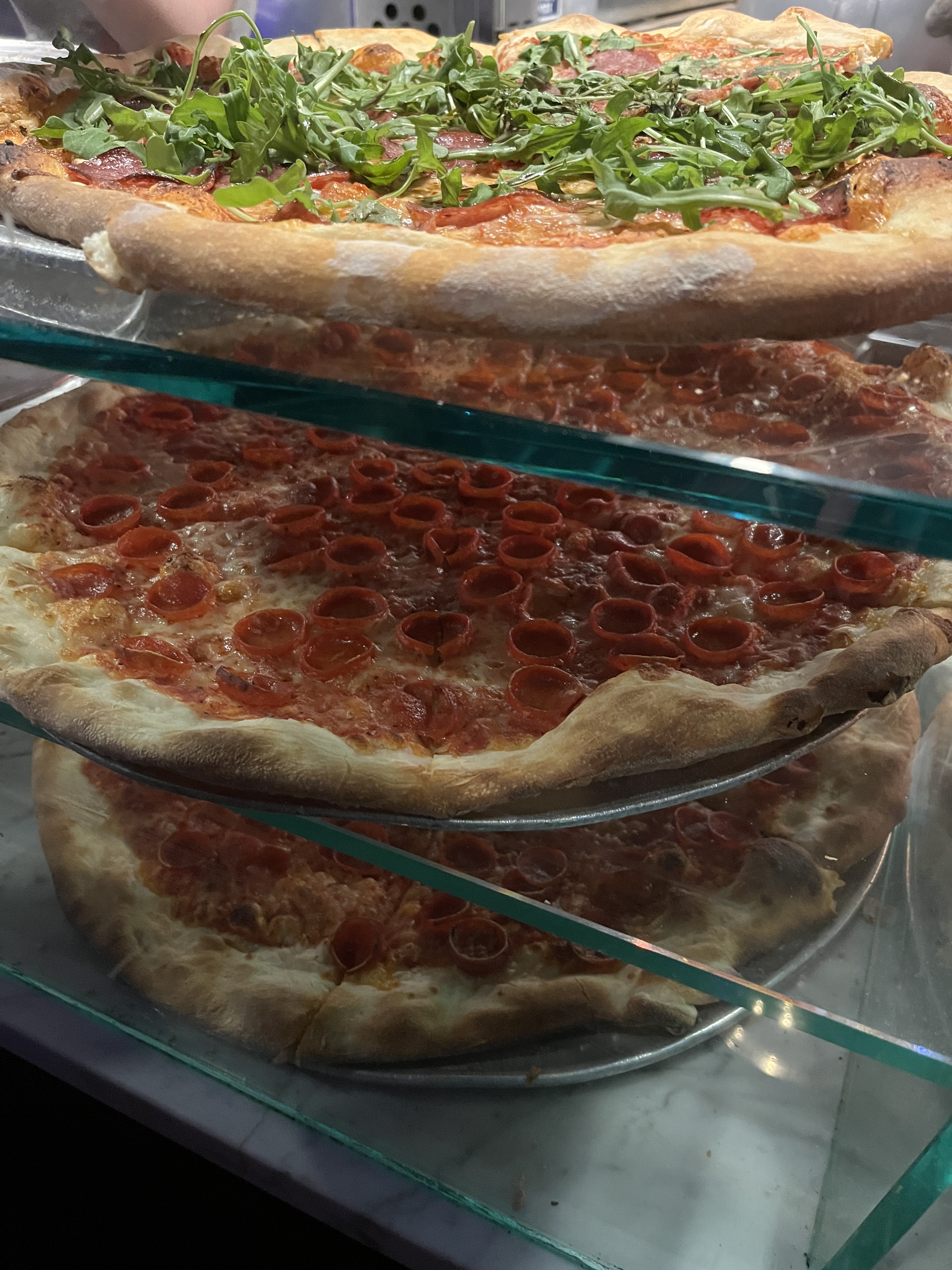
Pizza varieties displayed in Capitol Hill in 2022

Julia Wayne included the macaroni and cheese pizza in Eater Seattle's 2015 list of "10 Amazing Seattle Cheese Dishes You Have to Eat Now" and wrote, "Noon or night, the pizzas are creative and consistent." The website's Kelly Knickerbocker included Big Mario's in a 2021 overview of the "Top Spots to Eat and Drink Along the Burke-Gilman Trail". Maggy Lehmicke and Dylan Joffe included the chain in Eater Seattle's 2022 list of "12 Essential Late-Night Restaurants in Seattle" and wrote, "The big, cheesy, New York slices with curled pepperoni cups are the perfect, filling late-night bite." Jade Yamazaki Stewart included the Queen Anne location in a 2022 list of "10 Great Restaurants Near Seattle Center". Stewart called the business a "classic Seattle pizza shop" and wrote, "The big, cheesy, New York slices with curled pepperoni cups are the perfect, filling late-night bite, and the divey locale (with a small backroom bar) is a good spot for a relaxing beer any time of the day."

Chelsea Lin, Naomi Tomky, and Megan Lamb included Big Mario's in Seattle Magazine's 2018 overview of "The Best New York and Chicago Style Pizza in Seattle". Jake Uitti ranked the business fifth in The Stranger's 2018 "pizza pie face off", a search for the best pizza in Seattle. In 2021, Bradley Foster and Emma Banks included the Capitol Hill location in Thrillist's list of "The Absolute Best Pizza in Seattle". Allecia Vermillion included the Fremont location in Seattle Metropolitan's 2022 list of "Seattle's Best Pizza by Neighborhood".

== See also ==
- List of pizza chains of the United States
