= Dion's =

Pizza Restaurant headquartered in New Mexico

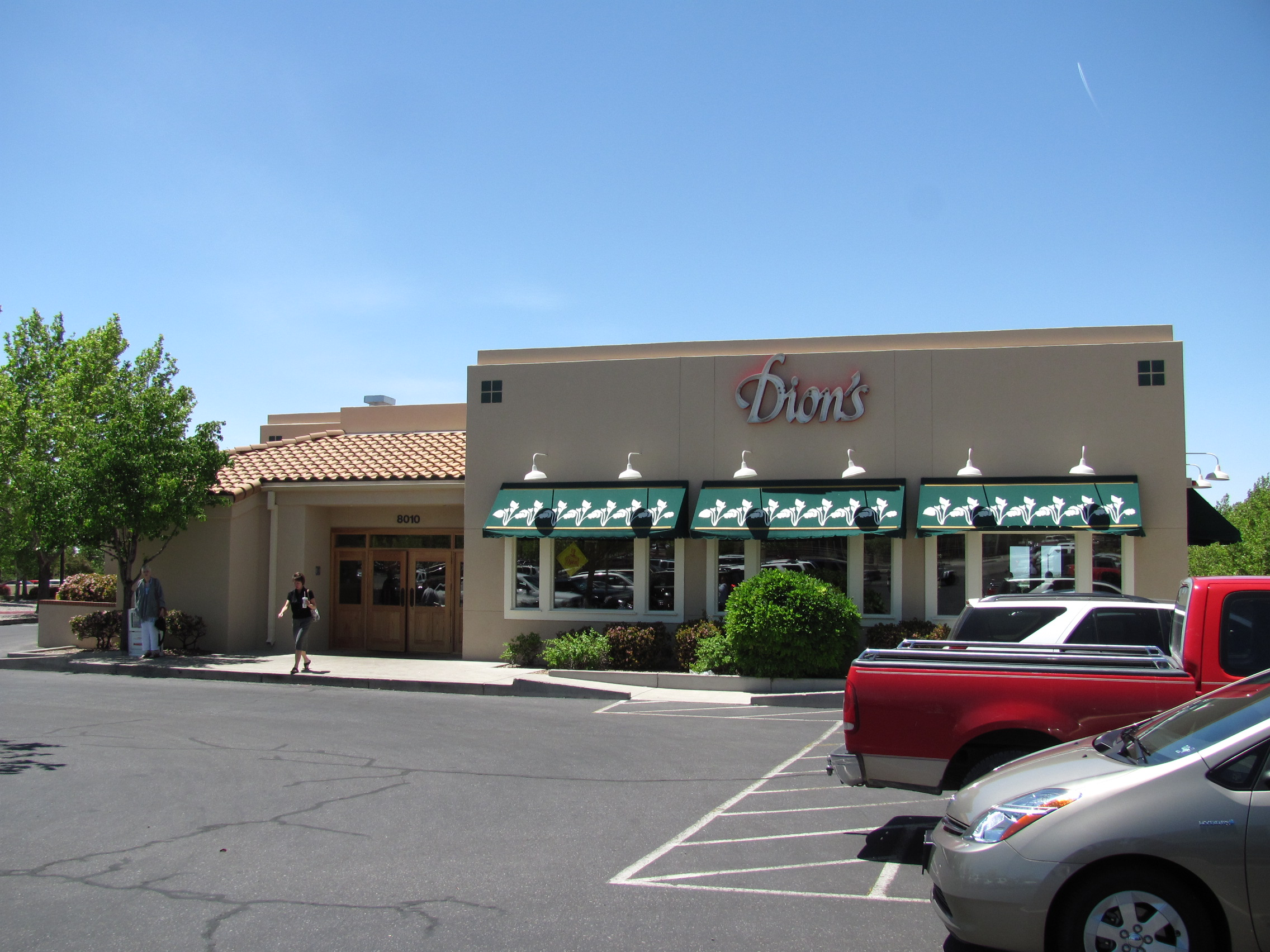
- Type: Private
- Founded: 1978; 48 years ago
- Founder: Jon Patten and Bill Scott
- Headquarters: Albuquerque, New Mexico
- Number of locations: 28
- Area served: Colorado, New Mexico and Texas
- Products: Pizza, Subs and Salads
- Website: www.dions.com

Dion’s is a privately owned group of pizza restaurants based in Albuquerque, New Mexico. As of 2024 Dion’s operates 28 restaurants; 22 in New Mexico, 4 in Texas, and 3 in Colorado.

== History ==
Dion’s was founded in 1978 by Jon Patten and Bill Scott, longtime childhood friends from Birmingham, Michigan. The pair moved to New Mexico and bought a small pizzeria called New York Pizza in Albuquerque with the intention of converting it to a Greek restaurant. The name for their new place was going to be ‘Dionysus’, the name of the Greek god of the grape harvest and wine. When the two received the bid for their new sign, they decided to shorten the name to "Dion's" so that they could save money.

Upon opening, the Greek menu was mildly successful but the customers frequently requested pizza. This quickly became the focal point of the menu. Today their Greek salad is the only vestige of the original menu. Jon and Bill did not have any experience in the restaurant business and neither of them had a business background. They learned their trade as they developed it, gathering help and advice wherever they could.

== Development ==
In 1979, a year after opening their first restaurant, Dion’s built their second location in the North Towne Plaza shopping center in Albuquerque, NM. Soon after that they received a positive write-up in the Albuquerque Journal, which helped boost their sales and sent them on their way to sustainable sales gains in the years to come.

In the early days their stores were located in strip shopping centers around Albuquerque, but starting in 1987, Dion's quickly evolved into free-standing buildings. The new free-standing locations came with drive thru windows which allowed customers to call in their order ahead and pick it up at the window. The pick up window worked very well and eventually accounted for nearly 35% of each store's sales. It became a standard feature on all new freestanding stores. Today all their stores are freestanding and average in size of 5,200 square feet.

== Food ==
Dion’s has a menu with three main items; pizza, salads, and subs. Pizzas are handmade, and available in three regular sizes and two gourmet. Salads come in three sizes, half, full, or family servings. Their subs can come on either wheat or white bread. Dessert options are cookies and brownies. Beverage options include sodas, lemonade, and sweet tea or unsweetened tea, they also have Arnold Palmer.

Distinctive New Mexican cuisine pizza toppings include New Mexico chile and piñón.

Dion's is also known for its "green chile ranch" and "Greek dressing" which it sells in bottles.

== Awards ==
Dion's has won "Best Pizza" from Albuquerque the Magazine six years in a row. They have also recently won the Literacy Award for their Club Read program from The Camino Real Council of the International Reading Association. In both 2015 and 2016, Dion's was rated top five in Sandelman's Quick-Track Awards of Excellence.

== See also ==
- List of pizza chains of the United States
