= Big Mama's & Papa's Pizzeria =

Pizza restaurant chain

A Big Mama's & Papa's Pizzeria in Los Angeles

Big Mama's & Papa's Pizzeria is a pizza restaurant chain located in Southern California. The chain is notable for its large "Giant Sicilian" pizza. During the 86th Academy Awards in 2014, host Ellen DeGeneres had Big Mama's pizzas delivered onstage.

One of the restaurant's signature products is a large "Giant Sicilian" pizza.

== History ==
The first Big Mama's & Papa's was opened in 1992 by Armenian immigrant brothers Aro and Allen Agakhanyan. At the time, the brothers were neither fluent in English nor out of high school. Since that time, the chain has expanded to 20 restaurants in the Southern California region.

== In popular culture ==
During the 86th Academy Awards in 2014, host Ellen DeGeneres called for pizzas to be delivered for the enjoyment of the audience. An order was made for twenty pizzas to be delivered to the Dolby Theatre.

To the surprise of the deliveryman, who thought the pizza was merely for the backstage crew, Ellen brought him onstage and had him deliver the pizza to the assembled celebrities. She then passed Pharrell's trademark hat around to gather contributions for a tip from the movie stars.

== See also ==
- List of pizza chains of the United States
