= Pizza Patrón =

American pizza chain

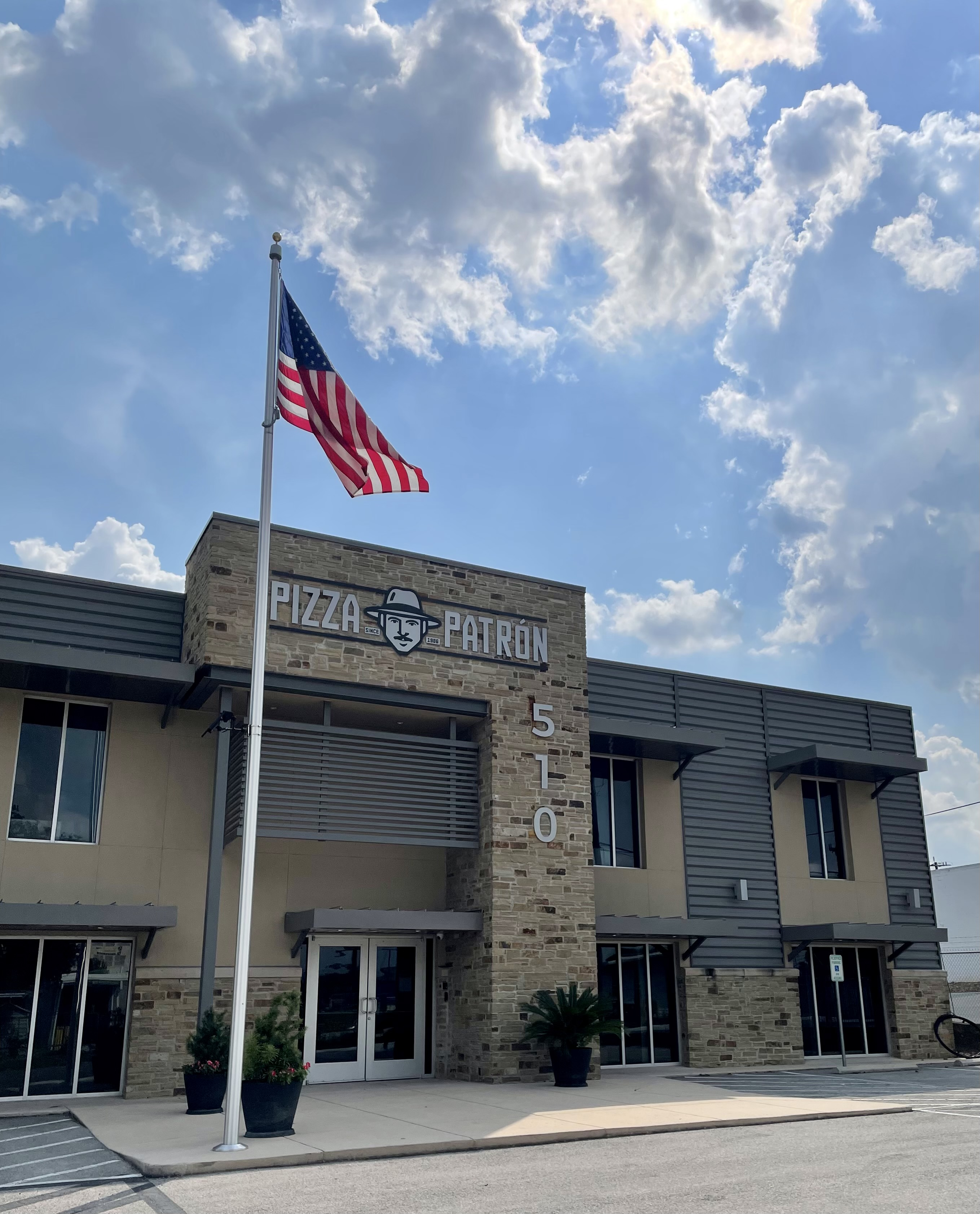
- San Antonio HQ
- Industry: Restaurants
- Founded: 1986; 40 years ago
- Founders: Antonio Swad; Bernadette Fiaschetti
- Headquarters: San Antonio, Texas
- Key people: Charles Loflin - CEO, Chris Partyka - President
- Products: Pizza
- Website: www.pizzapatron.com

Pizza Patrón Inc. is an American pizza chain formerly headquartered in Dallas, now headquartered in San Antonio, Texas. It was founded in 1986 by Antonio Swad and Bernadette Fiaschetti. In 2016, Swad sold Pizza Patrón to Charles Loflin, the new CEO.

The chain primarily opened locations in neighborhoods with a high proportion of Hispanic residents. Now it operates in Arizona and Texas. In addition to the franchise's 100 locations across the southwest United States, 40 more are currently under development. In 2007, it received significant positive and negative attention for its "Pizza por Pesos" program which allows customers to pay using Mexican pesos. Originally only a temporary promotion, the acceptance of pesos became permanent due to the program's success.

== Brand relaunch ==
In 2018, Pizza Patrón went through a brand relaunch to appeal to a younger consumer base. The transition included several different segments including a logo change.

== Expansion, new menu items ==
On May 3, 2007, the company reported that sales in the first three months of 2007 were up 35% compared to sales during the first three months of 2006. The company attributed the strong growth in sales to publicity generated by news reports about the "Pizza for Pesos" campaign and said that its policy of accepting pesos, originally scheduled to last only until the end of April, was being made permanent.

Pizza Patrón decided to expand its online horizons by further touching base with its online presence. With the company's online ordering becoming more prevalent, an interlacing app was released at the end of March 2020.

== Founding ==
Pizza Patrón was founded in 1986 by Antonio Swad, of Lebanese and Italian descent. Swad is also known for founding the Wingstop brand, which was sold in 2003 to focus on growing the Pizza Patrón brand. The brand has since been sold, and Swad is now working on other restaurant ventures. Pizza Patrón was also founded by Bernadette Fiaschetti, who is of Italian and Irish descent. Fiaschetti is also known for founding Wingstop. She has since moved on from restaurants, and now hosts a nationally syndicated radio show on iHeartMedia called One Life Radio.

== Promotions ==
=== Pizza por Pesos ===
In January 2007, Pizza Patrón announced a new "Pizza por Pesos" policy, allowing customers to pay for pizzas in Mexican pesos for a short period. Though the company was not the first to implement such a policy in the United States, the move occurred during an increasingly heated debate about illegal immigration, prompting complaints and death threats at the chain's Dallas headquarters. It also garnered popularity for the chain, with coverage from Fox News, The Colbert Report, MSNBC, The Tonight Show, and many other sites. After the first week of the offer, one owner stated that customers had paid with approximately 15,000 Mexican pesos, or about US$1,400, at his two southern California shops, accounting for roughly 20% of his profits.

On May 3, 2007, the company reported that sales in the first three months of 2007 were up 35% compared to sales during the first three months of 2006. The company attributed the strong growth in sales to publicity generated by news reports about the "Pizza for Pesos" campaign and said that its policy of accepting pesos, originally scheduled to last only until the end of April, was being made permanent.

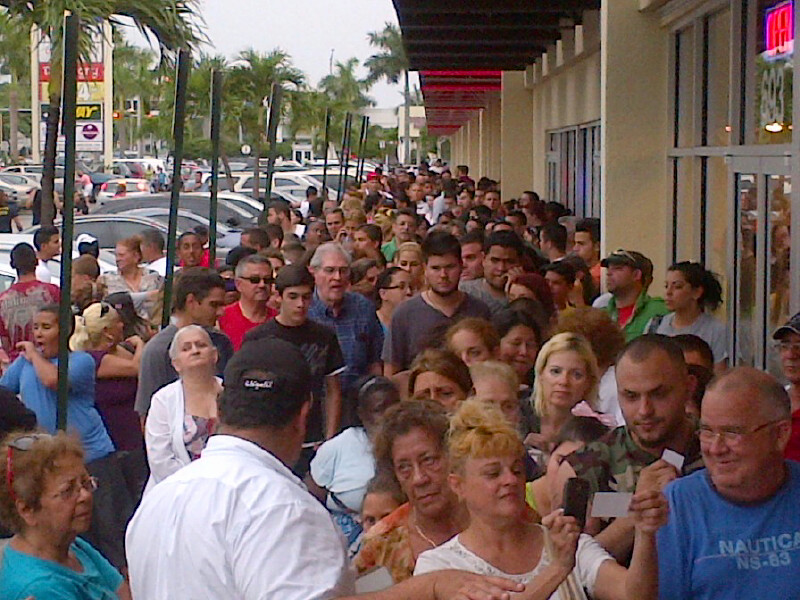
"Pizza Por Favor" crowds line up for free pizza on June 6, 2012.

=== Pizza por Favor ===
On June 6, 2012, Pizza Patrón launched its "Pizza por Favor" promotion offering a free large pepperoni pizza to any customer who ordered in Spanish, by simply saying "Pizza Por Favor".

The event sparked controversy and criticism from conservative groups. The Conservative Caucus, an organization that advocates for English as the official national language of the United States, criticized “Pizza Por Favor,” and on the day in May when the promotion was announced, Pizza Patrón's email servers were maliciously hacked into. The company received international news coverage and gave away 80,000 pizzas during the one-day promotion, including 50,000 during the three-hour window it advertised plus another 30,000 in coupons for free pizzas that were given to people still waiting in line after supplies ran out and business hours had ended.

== See also ==
- List of pizza chains of the United States
