= Sal's Pizza =

Pizzeria chain in New England

- Type: Private
- Industry: Restaurants
- Founded: Salem, New Hampshire, United States (1990; 36 years ago)
- Founder: Sal Lupoli
- Headquarters: Lawrence, Massachusetts, United States
- Area served: New England
- Key people: Sal's Pizza
- Products: Pizza, pasta, calzone, chicken wings, desserts
- Number of employees: 300 (2007)
- Website: sals-pizza.com

Sal's Pizza is a chain of Italian restaurants based in New England. The chain is owned by Sal's Group, owner of Salvatores, Mary's Pasta & Sandwiches, and Riverwalk Properties. The company operates as a franchise, which prepare a combined total of over 60,000 pizzas weekly.

== History ==
Sal's Pizza first opened in Salem, New Hampshire, founded by Sal and Nick Lupoli in 1990. The first store opened at a time when Italian-based restaurant chains began to popularize. The store spawned franchises, and eventually grew to operate stores throughout the Boston and southern New Hampshire regions. The company offers franchising, and they are known for offering a three-pound, 19-inch pizza.

== See also ==
- List of pizza chains of the United States
