= Bearno's =

American pizza franchise

Bearno's Pizza
- Company type: Private
- Industry: Food Wholesale
- Founded: Louisville, Kentucky (1977; 49 years ago)
- Headquarters: Louisville, Kentucky
- Key people: E. Joseph Steier (chairman and CEO); Rob Mooney (president)
- Products: Pizza
- Website: www.bearnos.com

Bearno's Pizza is a pizza franchise based in Louisville, Kentucky with about 14 locations in Kentucky and Indiana.

== Overview ==
Bearno's Pizza was established in 1977 and is owned and operated by Bearno's Inc. A subsidiary, Bearno's International LLC, markets the chain to international franchisees. So far, Bearno's International has partnered with U.S. Hospitality International LLC to open two restaurants in Beijing. E. Joseph Steier, Bearno's chairman and CEO, hopes to expand to 40 more locations in China, and possibly Thailand and other Far East nations.

Bearno's Pizza serves Sicilian pizza and their original pizza commonly referred to as Louisville-style Pizza. In addition to pizza, Bearno's is known for its stromboli steak sandwich. The company also purveys other food products.

== Reception ==
Bearno's Pizza was listed in Pizza Today magazine's Hot 100 Companies list, published in June 1999.

== See also ==
- List of pizza chains of the United States
