= Mellow Mushroom =

Restaurant franchise based in Atlanta, Georgia, U.S.

- Logo since 2024

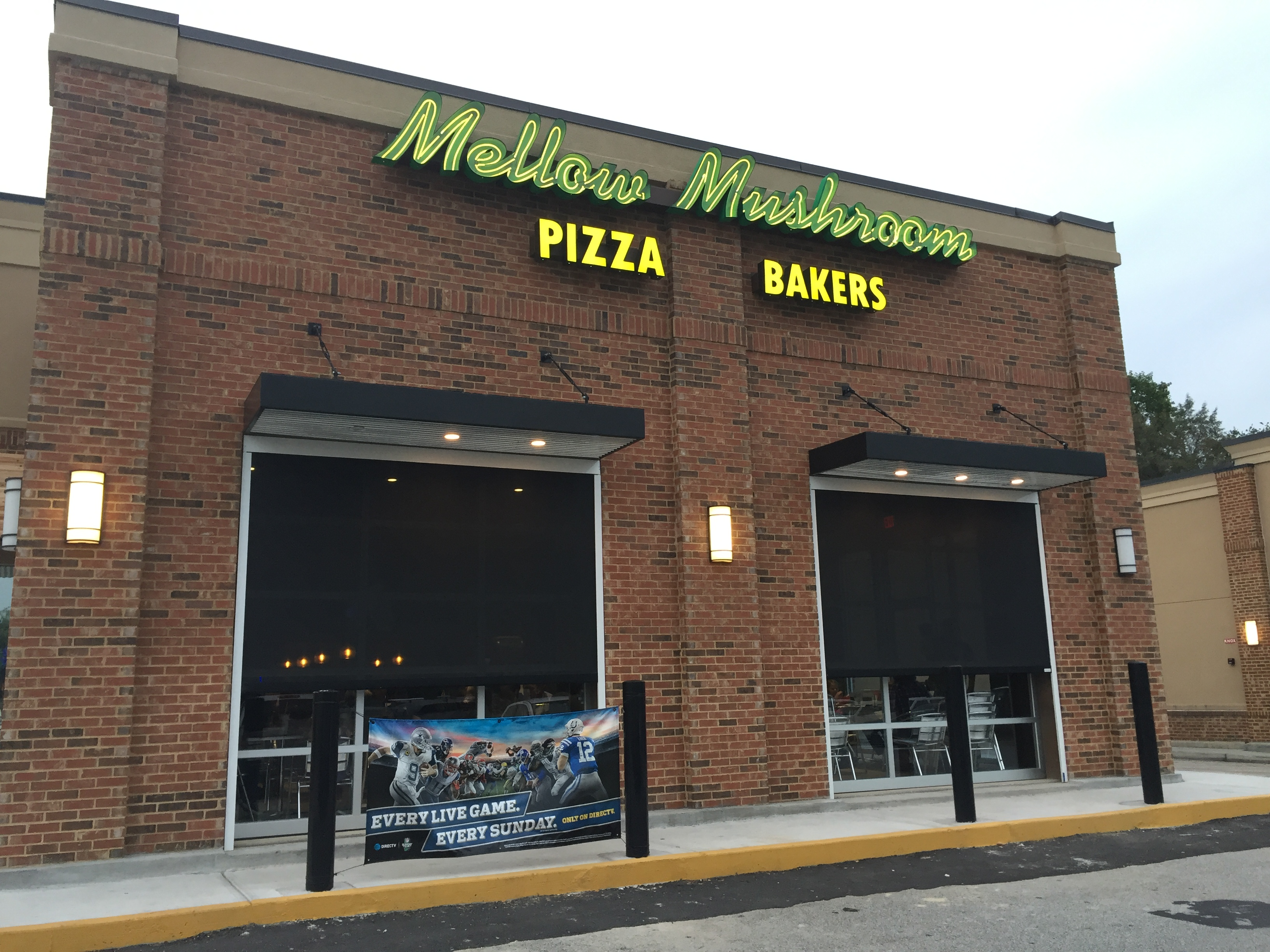
- Mellow Mushroom in Hiram, Georgia
- Type: Private
- Industry: Restaurant franchise
- Founded: 1974; 52 years ago
- Founders: Rocky Reeves; Mike Nicholson
- Headquarters: Atlanta, Georgia, U.S.
- Number of locations: 170 (2021)
- Key people: Marc Weinstein, Richard Brasch, Rocky Reeves, Mike Nicholson
- Products: Stone-Baked Pizza, Craft Cocktails, Burgers, Salads, Calzones, Hoagies & Sandwiches, Craft and local Beer
- Revenue: US$395 million (2023)
- Owner: Home Grown Industries, Inc.
- Number of employees: 6,216 employees (2022)
- Website: mellowmushroom.com

Mellow Mushroom Pizza Bakers is an American pizza restaurant chain established in 1974 in Atlanta, Georgia as a single pizzeria. It operates as a franchise under the banner of Home Grown Industries, Inc. of Georgia, with 170 locations throughout the United States. Its headquarters are in Atlanta.

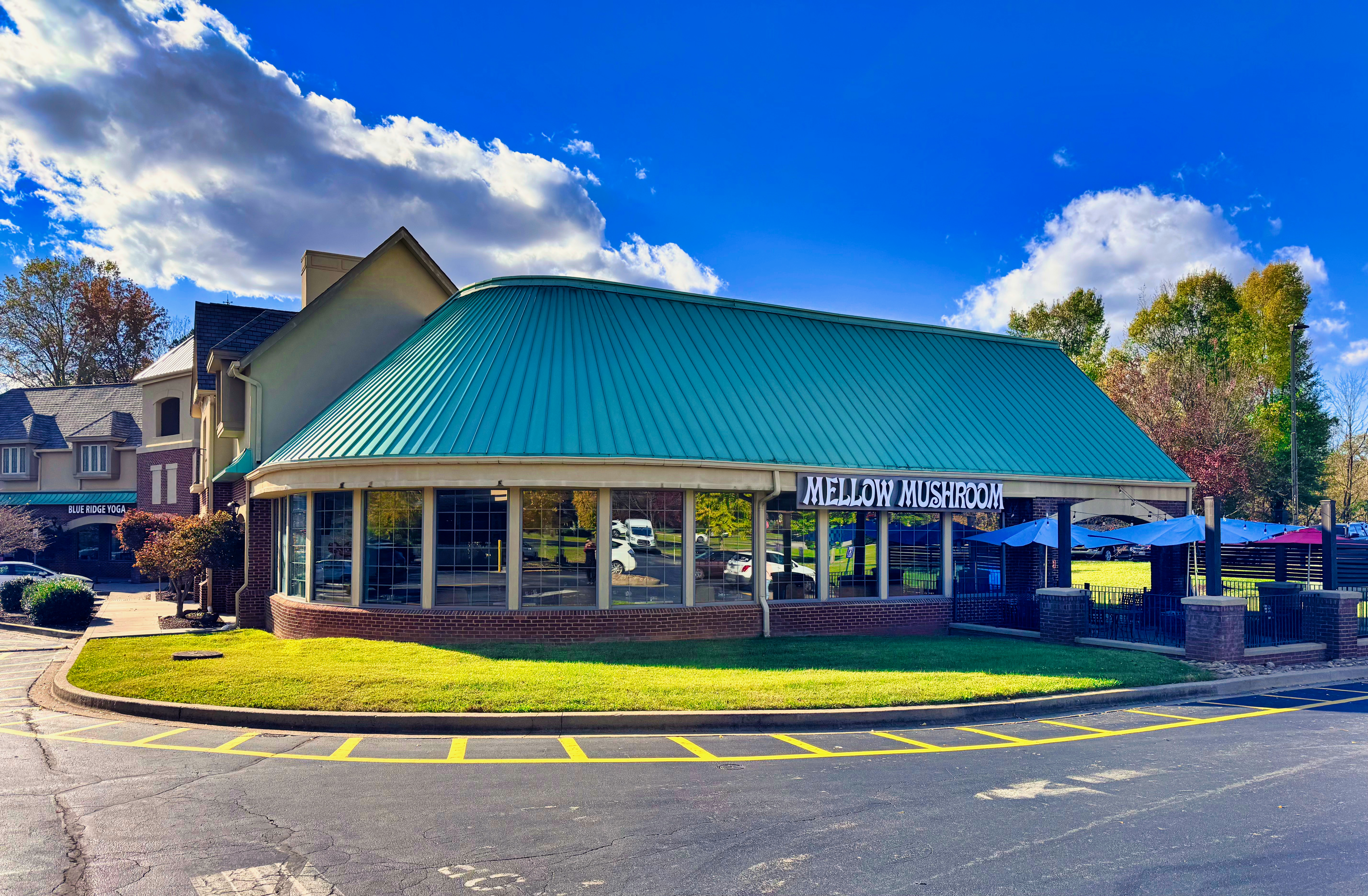
Mellow Mushroom in Farragut, Tennessee

== Details ==
Mellow Mushroom restaurants specialize in pizza but also serve calzones, hoagies, salads, appetizers, such as pretzel bites and a wide beer selection. They often feature a large selection of beer, typically 20-40 beers on draft and 50 or more bottled. Each store is locally owned, operated and decorated differently. Sometimes there is a unifying theme to the artwork. Tie-dye and colorful mushrooms are a common theme for locations. Some locations host events such as trivia nights and live music.

== History ==
Mellow Mushroom opened in Atlanta, Georgia in 1974 when two college students from Georgia Tech, later joined by a third from the University of Georgia, founded a business that reflected their eccentric philosophies. The first restaurant was opened on Spring Street in Atlanta. In the late 1980s, the first franchise was opened by an employee, followed by customer-owned franchises, and then to friends of employees and customers. Each franchise is locally owned and operated with its unique feel.

The first franchise outside of Atlanta was in Athens, Georgia, near the University of Georgia. There are several dozen locations operating in Atlanta and elsewhere in Georgia. Beginning in 2000, the franchise expanded outside college markets to urban areas such as Jacksonville, Florida and Denver, Colorado. To date, the chain has over 200 locations across 20 states.

== Logo ==
The logo used until 2023

The visual identity of Mellow Mushroom Pizza was defined during their early franchising phase by Atlanta artist Buddy Finethy. Finethy created and refined the chain's mascot, Mel O. Mushroom, as well as the supporting cast of animated characters that identified the chain.

In November 2024, the company rebranded, changing the color palette to purple and replacing the mushroom character with a drawing of a mushroom, together with launching a new website.

== See also ==
- List of pizza chains of the United States
