= Straw Hat Pizza =

American pizza chain

- Type: Subsidiary
- Founded: July 10, 1959; 67 years ago San Leandro, California, United States
- Founders: Charlie Olson; Bill Henderlong
- Headquarters: Brentwood, California, United States
- Number of locations: 27
- Key people: Sal Listek (Chairman of the Board)
- Products: Pizza, chicken wings, salads
- Parent: Straw Hat Restaurants Inc.
- Website: www.strawhatpizza.com

Straw Hat Pizza is a chain of pizza restaurants founded in 1959 in San Leandro, California.

== History ==
Charlie Olson and Bill Henderlong founded Straw Hat Pizza in 1959, after working together for a regional chain called Me-N-Ed's. They named the store after hats worn by employees at their former employer. At one point there were 230 locations across California and Nevada.

== Locations ==
As of August 2026, the company's website lists 23 locations spread across California.

== See also ==
- List of pizza chains of the United States
