= Russo's New York Pizzeria =

US-based restaurant franchise

Russo’s New York Pizzeria
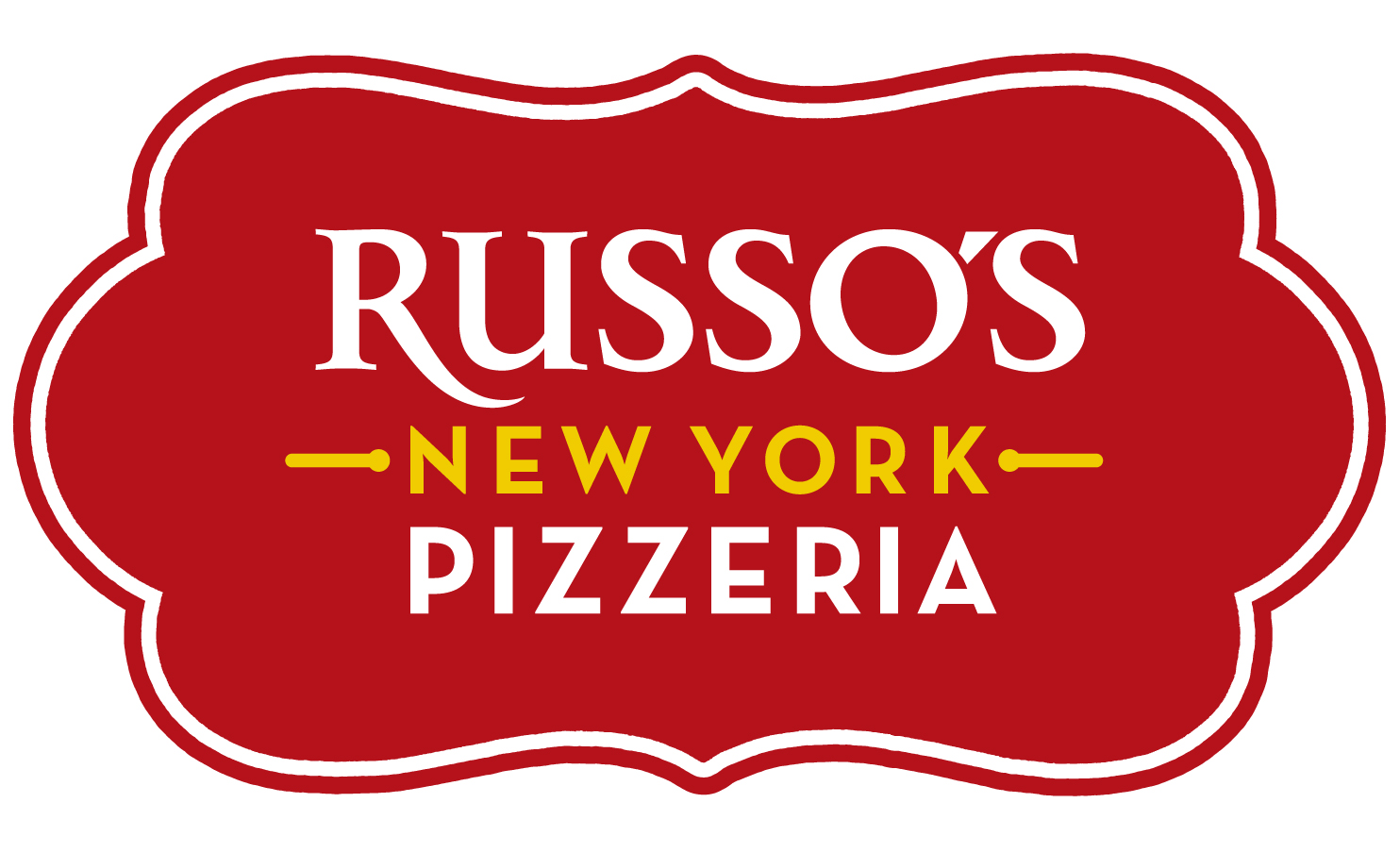
- Company type: Private
- Industry: Hospitality – Restaurant Franchise
- Founded: Houston, Texas 1992; 34 years ago
- Founder: Anthony Russo
- Headquarters: Houston, Texas, United States
- Number of locations: 49
- Area served: Arkansas, Florida, Hawaii, Oklahoma, Tennessee, Texas / International: United Arab Emirates, Bahrain, Qatar, Kingdom of Saudi Arabia
- Products: New York–style pizza, Calzones, Pastas, Pizzotos, Soups, Salads, traditional Italian fare
- Owner: Anthony Russo
- Divisions: Russo’s New York Pizzeria & Russo’s Coal Fired Italian Kitchen
- Website: www.nypizzeria.com

Russo's New York Pizzeria is based in Houston, Texas and was established in 1992 by Anthony Russo. The chain serves New York–style pizza as well as several different types of Italian cuisine to include: soups, salads, pastas, calzones and dessert.

== Locations ==
Russo's New York Pizzeria & Italian Kitchen corporate headquarters are located in Houston, Texas, which supports both corporate and franchise locations, with over 50 franchise locations nationwide and expanding internationally in Dubai, UAE, Bahrain, Qatar and Saudi Arabia.

== See also ==
- List of pizza chains of the United States
