= Blackjack Pizza =

Pizza chain in Colorado, United States

Blackjack Pizza Franchising
- Industry: Restaurants Franchising
- Founded: June 29, 1983; 43 years ago
- Headquarters: Bloomfield Hills, Michigan, U.S.
- Number of locations: 45 (2018)
- Key people: Vince Schmuhl, Founder & President
- Products: Pizza
- Website: www.blackjackpizza.com

Blackjack Pizza is a Colorado-based pizza delivery chain founded in 1983 by a former Domino's Pizza employee, Vince Schmuhl, because Domino's Pizza was the only major pizza delivery company in the Rocky Mountain region and he thought customers would appreciate an alternative. On January 1, 2013, Blackjack Pizza was acquired by Askar Brands.

== History ==
While a University of Northern Colorado college student, Vince Schmuhl was a delivery driver for Domino's Pizza. After receiving a business degree in 1981, there were few jobs available, and Schmuhl wanted to provide another option to the major pizza companies. In exchange for equity, his parents, Jim and Wilma Schmuhl, gave him $10,000 to start Blackjack Pizza. Schmuhl named the pizza restaurant after the blackjack game to indicate it was fast food. Both blackjack and dominoes are games, so he wanted to indicate that Blackjack Pizza was an alternative to Domino's Pizza. The company's slogan was "Finally, there's a new game in town." The first Blackjack Pizza store opened on June 29, 1983, in Federal Heights with a second store opening in Greeley by February 1984. By 1986, Blackjack had grown to six corporate stores and one franchisee. The company headquarters, by 1999, was in what was then the Castlewood census-designated place in unincorporated Arapahoe County, Colorado, near Englewood. The territory became a part of Centennial, which incorporated in 2001 with all of the territory of the Castlewood CDP.

In 1988, Blackjack became a franchisor with the sale of several corporate stores to franchisees. As of 2018 Blackjack Pizza operated 45 stores in five states. Blackjack's tagline is "Better Pizza, Better Price."

Eric Harris and Dylan Klebold, the high school seniors who committed the 1999 Columbine High School massacre worked at the Blackjack Pizza store in Littleton, Colorado, and Harris eventually became shift manager. At this pizza parlor, the two teens made important acquaintances who were inadvertently connected to the attack at Columbine High School. The two teens were able to meet Mark Manes, the man who sold them the TEC-9 that they used in the attack, through the connection of Philip Duran, a fellow employee at the Blackjack Pizza store where they worked.

Denver Broncos wide receiver Rod Smith frequently appeared in Blackjack commercials until October 2008 when Blackjack rolled out a new ad campaign featuring the cast of Impulse Theater. Smith's slogan for Blackjack Pizza ads was "Stick with the home team."

== Philanthropy ==
Blackjack Pizza has donated money to several organizations. In 2005, Blackjack donated $8,842.40 to the Bonfils Blood Center Foundation, which Blackjack Pizza selected to be the winner of the "80 Cent Pizza Promotion". The pizzeria also sponsored a Future Farmers of America program in Fort Morgan, Colorado. In 2006, the franchise offered a deal to customers: every time they ordered the "Children's Hospital Special", the franchise would give a dollar to the Children's Hospital in Aurora, Colorado.

== Acquisitions ==
On January 1, 2013, Blackjack Pizza was acquired by Askar Brands, a Michigan-based company.

== See also ==
- List of food companies
- List of pizza chains of the United States
