= The Original Italian Pie =

Italian-American restaurant chain

- Type: Privately held company
- Industry: Dining
- Genre: casual dining
- Founded: 1992; 34 years ago
- Founder: Musa Ulusan and Fatma Nayir
- Headquarters: Slidell, Louisiana, USA
- Area served: Louisiana
- Key people: Tom Cangemi, CEO
- Products: Pizza Pie
- Website: http://www.italianpie.com

The Original Italian Pie is a chain of informal Italian-American restaurants. It was founded in 1995 by Musa Ulusan. Their first restaurant was located on Bienville Street in New Orleans, Louisiana. The menu consists of pizzas, salads, sandwiches, Pasta, Wraps and calzones.

The company began expanding through franchising in 1997 and by April 2010 had 13 locations in the Southeastern United States, but this had reduced to just six by November 2021.

== See also ==
- List of Italian restaurants
