= Sir Pizza =

American pizza restaurant chain

Sir Pizza is a United States chain of pizza restaurants. Wendell Swartz opened the original restaurant in Lafayette, Indiana, in 1957 under the name of Pizza King. A separate chain, Sir Pizza, also using the Pizza King name, was incorporated in 1965 in Muncie, Indiana by Robert Swartz, Wendell's brother, and in 1966 they expanded their Pizza King outside of Indiana under the name of "Sir Pizza". In Indiana, both chains still operate under the Pizza King name. The motto for Sir Pizza is "Good to the very edge".

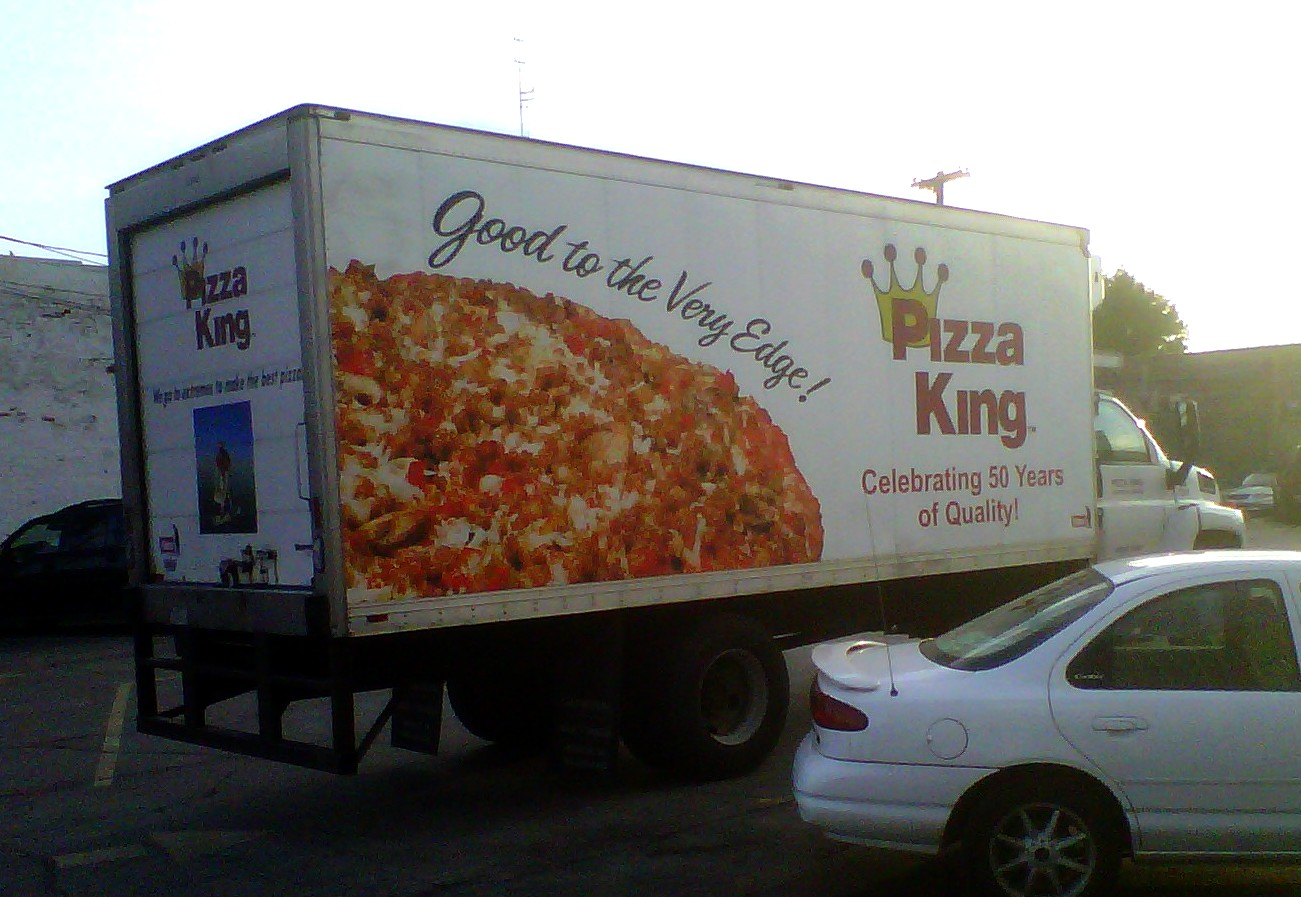
Pizza King (Sir Pizza) truck in Indiana

Sir Pizza franchise rights have been sold in North Carolina, South Carolina, Tennessee, Michigan, Florida, Indiana, Kentucky, and Pennsylvania.

== Food and advertising ==
Various Sir Pizza franchises market the pizza with the phrase "Good to the Very Edge", which purports to reference the lack of a traditional crust in Sir Pizza pizzas. Specifically the pizza pies are "virtually flat with cheese, sauce, and toppings loaded all the way to the very edge." Sir Pizza is unique in that it does not use more typical sliced pepperoni, rather the topping is ground into crumbles that are spread over the entire pizza, similar to sausage.

== Locations ==
=== Indiana ===
There are multiple Pizza King company-owned locations in Muncie, where the chain is based. Several Pizza King franchises are scattered throughout Indiana.

=== Kentucky ===
In Kentucky, Sir Pizza has multiple franchises in Lexington, along with one restaurant in Winchester.

=== Michigan ===
In Michigan, Sir Pizza has franchises in East Lansing, South Lansing, and Battle Creek.

=== North Carolina ===
In North Carolina, Sir Pizza has franchises in High Point, Thomasville, Troy, Siler City, Asheboro, Randleman, and Burlington.

=== Pennsylvania ===
In Pennsylvania, Sir Pizza has franchises in Pittsburgh, Wexford, and a recently closed location in Warrendale

=== Tennessee ===
In Tennessee, Sir Pizza has franchises in Murfreesboro, Burns, Antioch, Hermitage, Nashville, Goodlettsville, Shelbyville, Bellevue, Fairview, and LaVergne.

=== Florida ===
In Florida, Sir Pizza has two in the Miami area.

=== France ===
Paris briefly had a franchise from 2002 to 2007.

== See also ==
- Peter Jubeck
- List of pizza chains of the United States
