= Extreme Pizza =

Pizza restaurant franchise chain

Extreme Pizza, Inc.
- Type: Private
- Industry: Restaurant Franchising
- Founded: 1994; 32 years ago
- Headquarters: San Francisco, California
- Products: Pizzas, Sandwiches (main)
- Website: extremepizza.com

Extreme Pizza, Inc. is a privately held restaurant franchise chain specializing in conventional and California-style pizza, founded by Todd Parent and Michael Pastor in 1994 in San Francisco, California.

The chain currently includes over 30 locations in the United States; a previous location in Ireland that has now closed. 24 franchises located in Central California. Others are present in Boise, Idaho; McAllen, Texas; Clearwater Beach, Florida; Grosse Pointe, Michigan; Wantage, New Jersey; and Charlottesville and Henrico, Virginia.

Entrepreneur Ernest Harris recently brought the franchise to Northern Virginia, opening locations in Pentagon City and Arlington County. The company primarily sells pizza; other menu items include calzones, sandwiches, and salads.

== Description ==
Most West Coast restaurants have decor of extreme sports, such as photographs of extreme athletes and benches made out of snowboards. In keeping with its extreme sports theme, Extreme Pizza was an early sponsor of the X Games. According to the Seattle Times, Extreme Pizza is "lauded within the business world for its enlightened corporate policies and savvy extreme-sports sponsorships".

== See also ==
- List of pizza chains of the United States
