= Zpizza =

Californian pizza franchise

zpizza

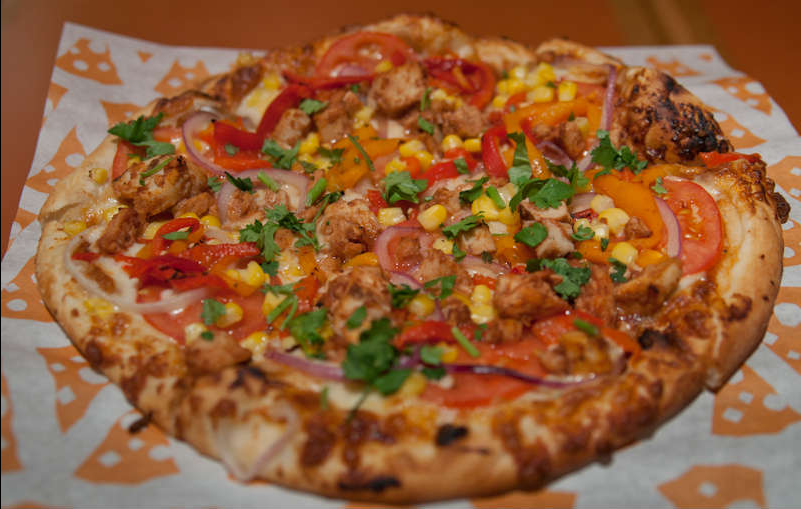
- ZBQ barbecue chicken pizza from zpizza
- Industry: Restaurants
- Founded: 1986; 40 years ago
- Headquarters: Irvine, California
- Key people: Suzy Megroz (original founder) Sid Fanarof (Founder), Ron Osmena (Operations)
- Products: Pizza
- Website: www.zpizza.com

zpizza (originally called z pizza and commonly known as z) is a pizza franchise based in Newport Beach, California.

zpizza has locations in California, Arizona, Vietnam and soon the Philippines, they plan to increase locations in 2025-2026. The menu includes artisan pizza with fresh high quality locally sourced ingredients, salads, and sandwiches. zpizza's customers have the option of creating their own pizza from the provided "crusts, sauces, cheeses and toppings" on their menu, including gluten free and vegan options.

== History ==
zpizza was founded in Laguna Beach, California, in 1986 by Suzy Megroz & Sid Fanarof. It was owned by Fanarof, Chris Bright, and Dan Rowe, the founders of Fransmart. In 2022 zpizza was purchased by zpizza USA and its partners and hired Ron Osmena as its Operations and Contract Consulting and since then many new stores have opened in the country with the majority of them in Orange County, Riverside County, the Bay Area (Northern California), Los Angeles Counties, the Phoenix metro, and South East Asia. zpizza started to franchise in 2000.

During the restaurant's inception in Laguna Beach, Suzi Megroz & Fanarof, her business partner, called it "the pizza place". Raised in France, Suzi pronounced the name with an accent, "zee pizza place". They had not yet chosen an official name for the restaurant, and Suzi's pronunciation inspired them to call it z pizza. As the business matured, the company omitted the space, officially naming it "zpizza" and occasionally calling it "z".

== See also ==
- List of pizza franchises
