= Uncle Maddio's Pizza Joint =

American restaurant chain

- Type: Private
- Industry: Restaurant
- Genre: Fast casual
- Founded: 2009; 17 years ago
- Founder: Matt Andrew
- Headquarters: Atlanta, Georgia, United States
- Number of locations: 38
- Products: Pizza, salads, sandwiches and catering
- Parent: Integrity Brands
- Website: www.unclemaddios.com

Uncle Maddio's Pizza Joint is a fast casual restaurant chain serving pizzas, salads and sandwiches with its headquarters in Atlanta, Georgia, United States.

== History and growth ==
The first Uncle Maddio's Pizza Joint opened in 2009 in Atlanta. The chain currently has nearly 40 franchised units open in Georgia, Florida, Colorado, Alabama, Arkansas, South Carolina, North Carolina, North Dakota, and Tennessee, with additional locations announced for those states as well as Maryland, Iowa, Louisiana, Mississippi, Montana, and New Jersey.

Uncle Maddio's Pizza Joint was founded by CEO Matt Andrew, who was also a founder and former president of the Moe's Southwest Grill chain of Tex-Mex restaurants. On April 13, 2019, Integrity Brands – the parent company of the Uncle Maddio's brand name – filed for bankruptcy.

== See also ==
- List of pizza chains of the United States
