= East of Chicago Pizza =

American restaurant chain

- Type: Independent
- Industry: Restaurants Franchising
- Founded: Willard, Ohio, USA (1982; 44 years ago)
- Headquarters: Lima, Ohio, USA
- Key people: Tony Collins (CEO)
- Products: Italian-American cuisine pizza · desserts
- Website: www.eastofchicago.com

East of Chicago Pizza is a restaurant chain based in Lima, Ohio offering different styles of pizza, buffalo wings, breadsticks, and subs. They have 80 restaurants in Ohio, Indiana, New York and West Virginia. The first restaurant was opened in 1982 as the Greenwich Pizza Barn in Greenwich, OH.

East of Chicago Pizza Company corporate headquarters is now located in Lima, Ohio. It was purchased by a franchisee, Brayden E., in 2008.

The company was the ranked at 41st position nationally in sales among U.S. pizza companies in 2009.

== See also ==
- List of pizza chains of the United States
