= DoubleDave's Pizzaworks =

American restaurant chain

- Type: Privately held company
- Industry: Restaurant
- Founded: 1984; 42 years ago
- Founder: David Davydd Miller
- Headquarters: Austin, Texas, US
- Number of locations: 43
- Area served: Texas, Oklahoma, and Colorado
- Key people: Chuck Thorp (president & CEO); Joey Bramwell (COO)
- Products: Pizza, sandwiches
- Revenue: ▲US$26million (2024)
- Website: doubledaves.com

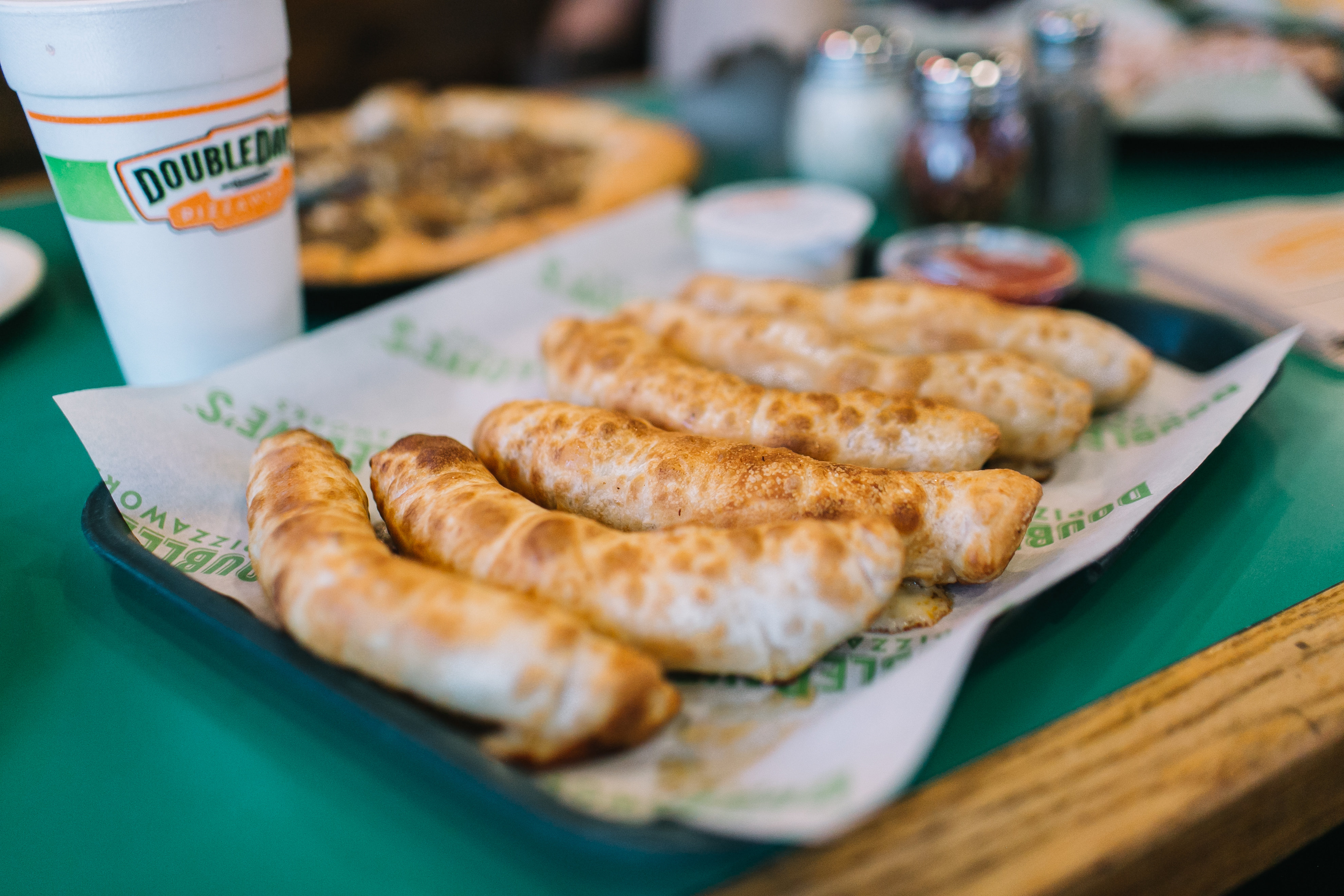
Famous Hand Made "Pepperoni Roll"

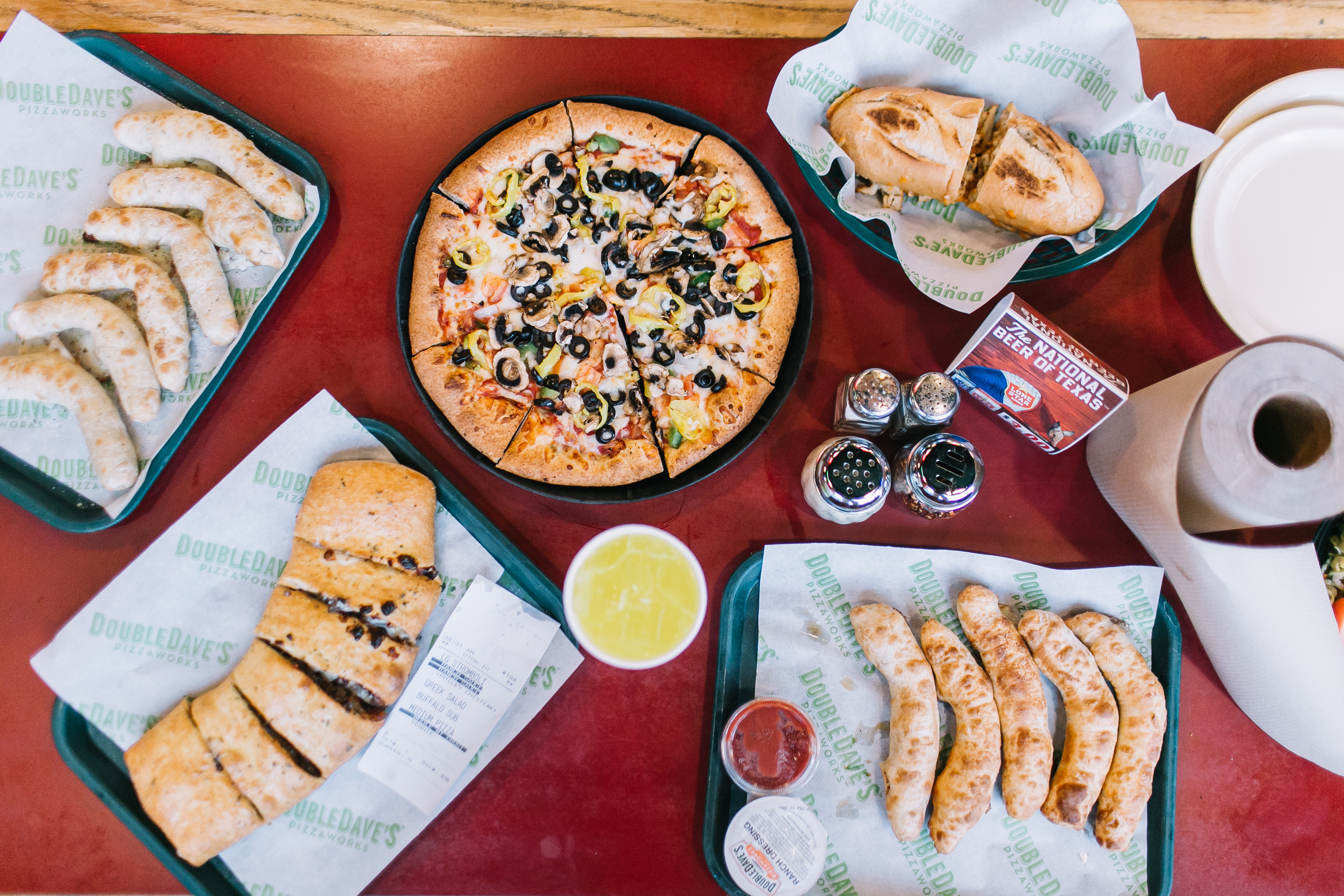
The Whole Pizzaworks

DoubleDave's Pizzaworks is a chain of pizza restaurants based in Austin, Texas. The first restaurant was founded by David Davydd Miller in College Station, Texas in 1984. Charles M. Thorp, Jr. is the CEO. In addition to several varieties of pizza the chain is famous for its 'Peproni Rolls'.

As of 2018 there were about 40 locations in Texas, two locations in Oklahoma, and one location in Colorado.

== History ==
David Davydd Miller opened the first DoubleDave's Pizzaworks in 1984 in College Station, Texas. DoubleDave's soon became popular with students and staff from the nearby Texas A&M University.

The first Oklahoma location opened in 2007 in Norman as a part of the HeyDay Entertainment center and the second in 2017 in Oklahoma City.

== Leadership ==
Chuck Thorp began working for DoubleDave's as a delivery driver in 1988 while studying at Texas A&M University. He became CEO of the company in 2007.

== Franchising ==
DoubleDave's began franchising in 1997. As of 2025, the chain's corporate headquarters was located at 14823 Fitzhugh Road in Austin, Texas. The company offers several restaurant formats, ranging from delivery/carry-out-only locations to full-service restaurants, with franchise fees of $15,000 for a delivery/carry-out unit and $25,000 for a regular unit.

== Menu ==
In addition to pizza and its signature Peproni Rolls, DoubleDave's menu includes Stromboli, "Stuffers", and homemade desserts, all made with hand-tossed dough and a custom flour blend developed by founder David Davydd Miller.

== See also ==
- List of companies based in Austin, Texas
- List of pizza chains of the United States
