= Patxi's Chicago Pizza =

American pizzeria chain

Coordinates: 37.776418°N 122.424934°W

- Industry: Dining
- Founded: 2004; 22 years ago
- Founder: William Freeman and Francisco “Patxi” Azpiroz
- Headquarters: Sausalito, California, USA
- Products: Pizza
- Parent: KarpReilly LLC
- Website: https://www.patxispizza.com/

Patxi's (pronounced pah-cheese) is a small pizzeria chain based in Sausalito, California.

== History ==
Patxi's was founded by William Freeman and Francisco “Patxi” Azpiroz. The restaurant chain specializes in Chicago-style pizza.

In April 2014, it was announced that the private-equity firm KarpReilly LLC acquired a controlling interest in the company. The announcement also stated that co-founder William Freeman would continue as the company's CEO, and that the company aimed to expand to 70 Patxi's locations by 2019.

On September 24, 2018, it was announced that Patxi's is being acquired by Elite Restaurant Group. Terms of the deal were not disclosed.

As of 2024, the firm has 5 restaurant locations.

As of 2025, the firm has only 4 locations in operation.

== In popular culture ==
On November 6, 2015, Patxi's partnered with UberEATS to offer $10.00 cheese pizzas that were delivered in a box that said "Little Nero's" to honor the twenty-fifth anniversary of the release of the comedy film Home Alone.

== Critical reception ==
The pizzeria has received positive reviews from several sources.
