= Pizza Ranch =

American fast casual pizza chain

Pizza Ranch, Inc.

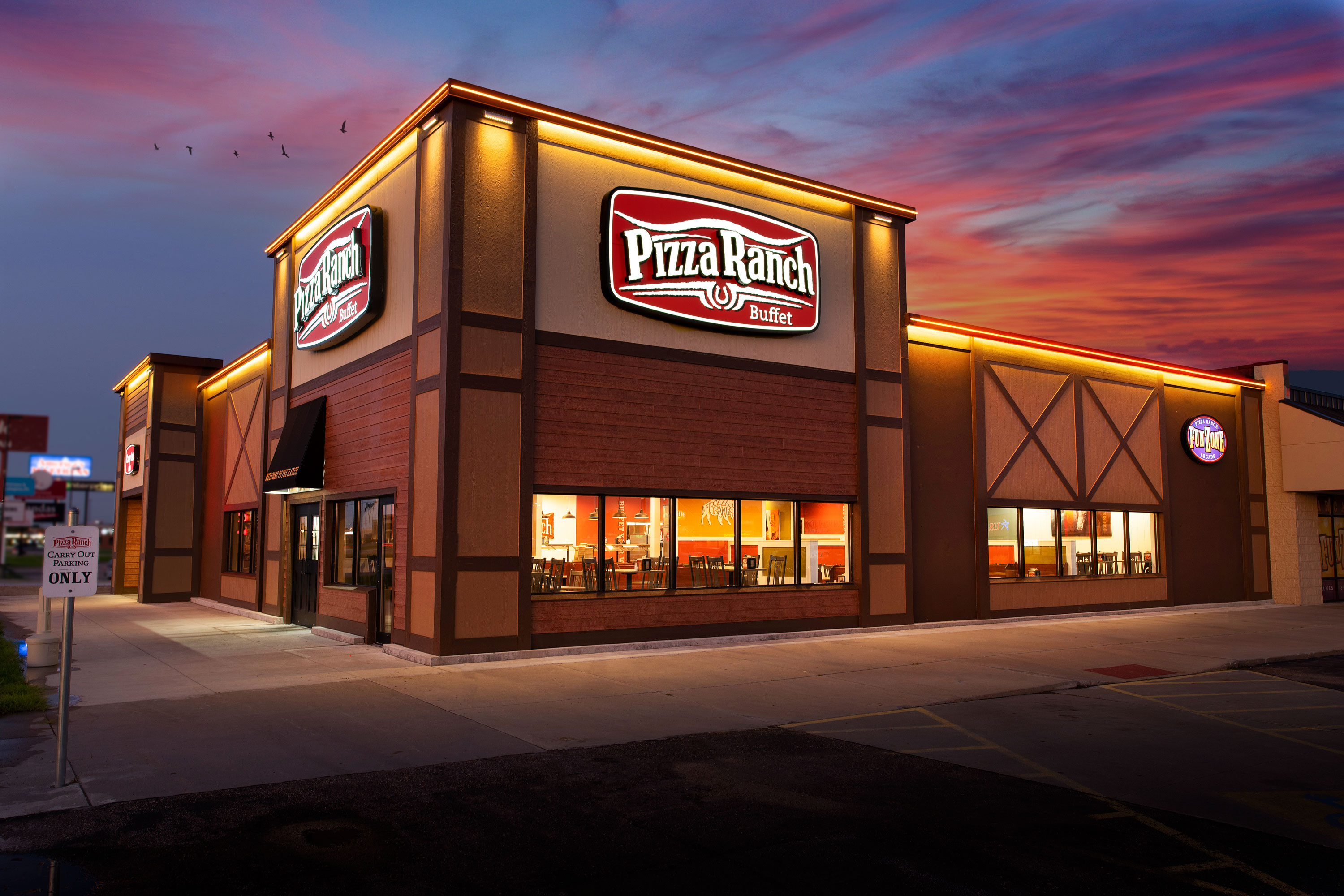
- A Pizza Ranch in Grand Island, Nebraska
- Type: Private
- Industry: Restaurants
- Founded: 1981; 45 years ago, in Hull, Iowa, U.S.
- Founders: Adrie Groeneweg; Lawrence Vander Esch
- Headquarters: Orange City, Iowa, U.S.
- Number of locations: 224
- Key people: Adrie Groeneweg (president, CEO & Owner); Jon Moss (CBO); Scott Post (COO)
- Products: Pizza; chicken
- Revenue: US$138.121 million
- Website: pizzaranch.com

Pizza Ranch, Inc. is an American fast casual buffet restaurant chain with more than 200 locations. It specializes in pizza and chicken. Pizza Ranch has locations in Colorado, Idaho, Illinois, Iowa, Kansas, Kentucky, Michigan, Minnesota, Missouri, Montana, Nebraska, North Dakota, South Dakota, Tennessee, Texas, Wisconsin, and Wyoming.

Pizza Ranch is a Christian-based company. The Pizza Ranch vision is "To glorify God by positively impacting the world we live in through pizza". Because Iowa has the first caucus for US presidential primary elections, Pizza Ranch's 66 locations in Iowa are a frequent stop for presidential candidates, particularly Republicans due to the chain's conservative bent.

== History ==
In 1981, Pizza Ranch was founded by Adrie Groeneweg and Lawrence Vander Esch. The first restaurant location opened on December 21, 1981, in Hull, Iowa. In 1983, two years later, the second Pizza Ranch opened in Orange City, Iowa.

In 2001, Vander Esch left the company after being arrested and sent to prison for sexual abuse involving fraudulently obtaining semen samples of their teen employees under the pretense of a prostate study. Vander Esch was discharged from prison in March 2006, according to the Iowa Department of Corrections. Later that year, a district court judge, citing an Iowa Supreme Court ruling in a separate case, vacated his conviction and cleared his record.

In 2005, the chain's headquarters, formerly located in Hull, Iowa, moved to Orange City, Iowa. In 2008, the 'Pizza Ranch strategy' was first noted in Mike Huckabee's campaign at the 2008 Republican caucuses; Huckabee went on to win the caucuses despite being a longshot candidate.

In 2024, an Iowa man achieved the feat of visiting every Pizza Ranch location in existence.

== See also ==
- List of pizza chains of the United States
