= LaRosa's Pizzeria =

American pizzeria chain

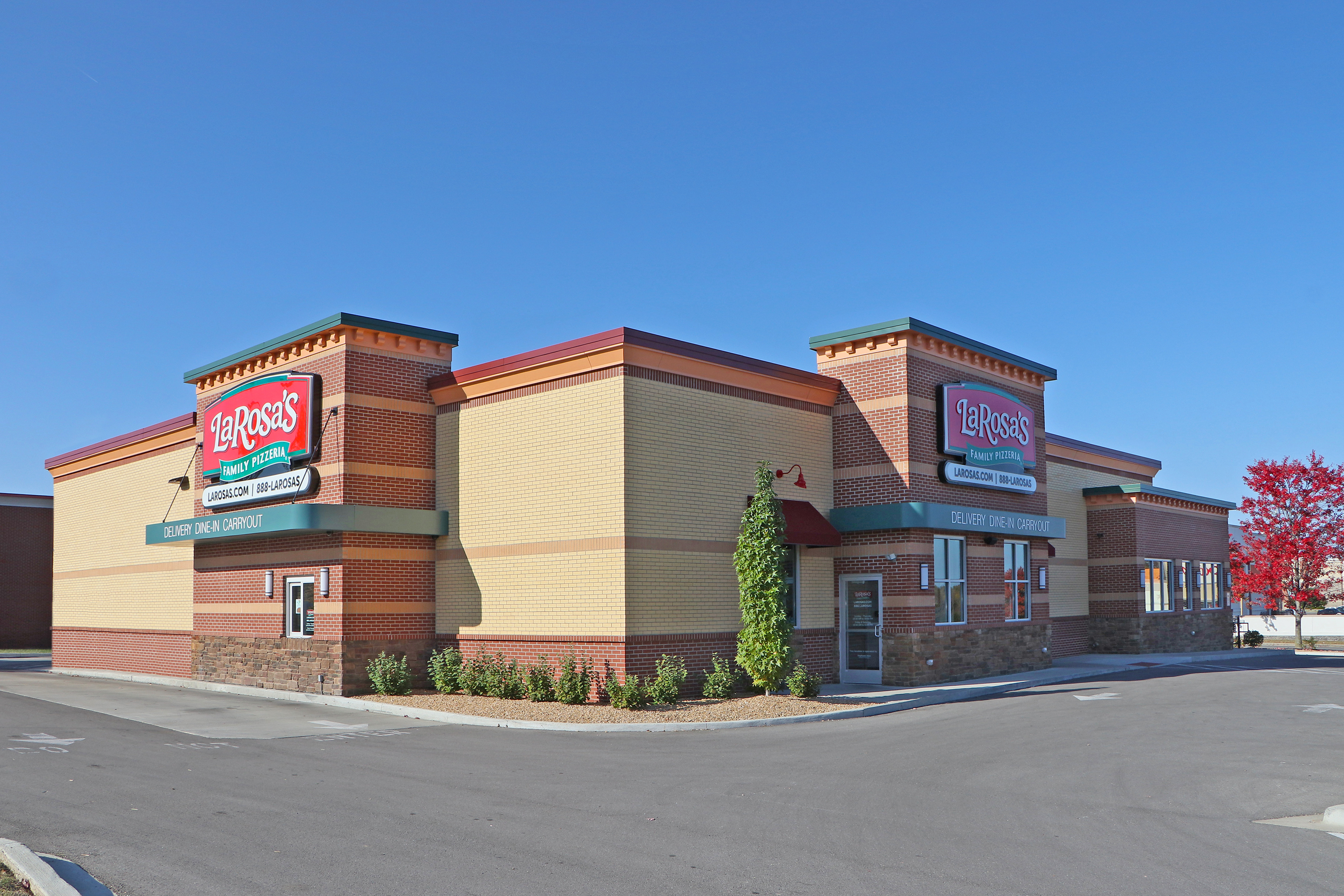
- LaRosa's Pizzeria in Lantern Ridge, KY
- Company type: Privately held company
- Industry: Restaurant
- Founded: 1954; 72 years ago
- Founder: Buddy LaRosa
- Headquarters: Cincinnati, Ohio, US, US
- Number of locations: 60 pizzerias (2026)
- Area served: Ohio, Kentucky, Indiana
- Key people: Donald "Buddy" LaRosa (founder, chairman emeritus); Michael LaRosa (CEO), (chairman of the board); Mark LaRosa (president, chief culinary officer)
- Products: Pizza, pasta, other Italian-American cuisine (over 40 selections)
- Revenue: ▲US$185 million (2023)
- Website: larosas.com

LaRosa's Pizzeria is a chain of pizzerias serving neighborhoods throughout Ohio, Kentucky, and Indiana. It was founded in 1954 by Donald "Buddy" LaRosa, along with partners Richard "Muzzie" Minella, Mike Soldano and Frank "Head" Serraino. Originally called Papa Gino's, LaRosa later bought out his partners, and changed the name to LaRosa's.

== History ==
Buddy LaRosa agreed to help his mother and aunts sell pizza at their church festival in the summer of 1953. Success at the festival led LaRosa to cash in a life insurance policy and rent his first restaurant building and pizza oven on Boudinot Avenue in the Westwood area of Cincinnati. The business expanded, and now operates 60 pizzerias, with total annual sales of $185 million.

LaRosa's has a 25 percent share of the local pizza market and boasts one of the highest sales volumes per pizzeria in the nation. Among U.S. pizza chains, LaRosa's has higher average per-store sales than Domino's, Donatos Pizza, Little Caesars, Papa John's, or Pizza Hut.

== Expansion ==
LaRosa's first franchise was sold in 1967 in Finneytown, Ohio. Following that, additional franchises were opened in Greater Cincinnati communities such as Clifton, Hyde Park, and White Oak. By 1980, LaRosa's had 25 locations.

Between 2004 and 2014, LaRosa's expanded further with corporately owned and franchise locations in Middletown, Liberty Township, Loveland, Mason, Colerain Township, and Oxford, among others, as well as locations in Northern Kentucky and Southeastern Indiana. LaRosa's pizzas are also provided at various entertainment venues in Cincinnati and at Cincinnati Children's Hospital Medical Centre.

LaRosa's expanded farther into Kentucky starting in the late 2010s. Its first location in Lexington, a full-service restaurant, opened in May 2019 but closed in July 2023. A second Lexington location, a delivery- and takeout-only store, opened in December 2019. Another location in nearby Nicholasville opened in March 2021 and closed in April 2022. The chain's first Louisville location opened in January 2023. The Louisville location closed on September 30, 2024, and LaRosa's states that they closed this location because of sales at the location that "did not consistently meet expectations."

== Menu ==
LaRosa's signature pizza is a thin crust variety made with a distinctive thick, sweet sauce (a family recipe created by the founder's Aunt Dena) and topped with provolone cheese. Their menu also includes "hoagys" with a variety of fillings and condiments, as well as calzones, salads, and pastas.

== Leadership ==
In 2008, leadership of the company shifted as the founder, Buddy LaRosa, moved into the role of Chairman Emeritus. During the same year, longtime Chief Executive Officer T.D. Hughes was succeeded by Buddy's son, Michael LaRosa. Mark LaRosa, also Buddy's son, is President and Chief Culinary Officer.

In 1999, Michael's son Nick LaRosa joined the company and today is Executive Vice President of Strategy and Business Intelligence, becoming the third generation of the LaRosa family to lead the chain.

== See also ==
- List of pizza chains of the United States
