= Sammy's Pizza =

Restaurant brand in Minnesota, US

Sammy's Pizza & Restaurant, Sammy Perrella's Pizza & Restaurant
- Founded: 1954; 72 years ago
- Headquarters: Hibbing, Minnesota, United States
- Key people: Sam Perrella, Louise Perrella, Founders
- Products: Pizza, Italian Food, American Food
- Website: www.mysammys.com

Sammy's Pizza & Restaurant is a regional restaurant brand. It was founded in 1954 in Hibbing, Minnesota, United States.

There are currently 14 affiliated Sammy's Pizza locations, each is independently owned by a member or close relative of the Perrella Family.

== Early history ==
Sam and Louise Perrella opened their first cafe in Keewatin, Minnesota after Sam was laid off from the local iron mines. Sam had heard war veterans talk of pizza and he visited a friend in Chicago to learn how to make pizza. After much experimentation and recipe development, some new equipment was purchased and the cafe was moved into a larger space at 107 East Howard in Hibbing, MN.

Originally called "La Pizzeria," Sam and Louise officially opened as a pizza restaurant on October 2, 1954.

== Expansion and growth ==
The original store had almost immediate success, so Sam decided to support relatives and friends who wanted to get into the business. In the late 1950s and early 1960s, Sam helped establish over 20 stores in Minnesota, Wisconsin, and North Dakota and eventually sold his interest in most of the stores to his partners.

After Sam's death in 1975, his sons Jeff and Greg expanded the original store and moved to a larger location across the street.

Greg left the business in 1989, and Jeff retired in 2002.

Some locations have been sold or closed over the years. There are currently 17 affiliated Sammy's or Sammy Perrella's locations.

== Sammy Perrella's ==
Two of Sam Perrella's grandsons opened the first store in the Twin Cities region of Minnesota in 2004. They trademarked Sammy Perrella's in order to protect the brand name in the new major market and in any foreseeable future markets. It was determined that the "Sammy's Pizza" name had been used by dozens of unrelated restaurants in other world and U.S. markets. They had exclusive rights to the "Sammy's Pizza" name in the region but it could not be registered as a unique trademark.
