= Pizza Fusion =

American pizza restaurant chain

- Type: Franchise
- Industry: Restaurant/Pizza
- Founded: 2006; 20 years ago
- Fate: Defunct
- Headquarters: Deerfield Beach, Florida
- Key people: Michael Gordon, Co-founder; Vaughn Lazar, Co-founder; Randy Romano, VP/Franchise Development
- Website: pizzafusion.com

Pizza Fusion was a pizza restaurant chain based in Deerfield Beach, Florida. Using mostly organic ingredients and emphasizing green building methods, the restaurants operated under the tagline Saving the Earth, One Pizza at a Time.

== Overview ==
Pizza Fusion was founded in 2006 by Michael Gordon and Vaughan Lazar. Lazar and Gordon had targeted Newman's Own, Patagonia, and Starbucks as role models, before opening their first store. In April 2009, the company signed a franchise agreement for Saudi Arabia with the Samir Group, a Saudi Arabia-based conglomerate.

It specialized in oval-shaped gourmet pizzas, salads, sandwiches, and beverages made from natural ingredients — along with gluten-free, vegan, and lactose-free menu items.

== Stores ==
At its peak, in 2008, the restaurant chain had 63 locations including those in California, Colorado, Connecticut, Florida, New Jersey, Ohio, as well as in Saudi Arabia (in Jeddah and Riyadh). Although it had projected growing to 300 stores by 2010, as of 2011 the chain was down to 13 locations. Its website in 2023 listed seven locations in the US and ten in Saudi Arabia and Dubai.

== Green building ==
Green construction materials and techniques used by the restaurant included a website powered by renewable energy, 100 percent post-consumer paper products, countertops remanufactured from plastic detergent bottles, wall insulation remanufactured from recycled blue jeans, 100% post-consumer drywall, non-VOC paint (volatile organic compounds), floor finishes with low VOC concrete sealant or renewable resources such as bamboo or cork, tiles from recycled glass bottles, low-flow toilets and sinks, Forest Steward Council wood, energy efficient—compact fluorescent lighting, super-efficient air conditioning and a heat exchange system that recaptures heat from the pizza ovens for the domestic hot water needs.

The chain offset 100% of the power consumption in its locations by using purchasing carbon credits and using environmentally sustainable building practices. The restaurant delivery drivers used hybrid electric vehicles.

== Awards ==
The Pizza Fusion website won a national Webby Award for best restaurant website in 2010.

== See also ==
- List of pizza chains of the United States
