= Toppers Pizza (American restaurant) =

American pizzeria chain

- The Toppers Pizza logo

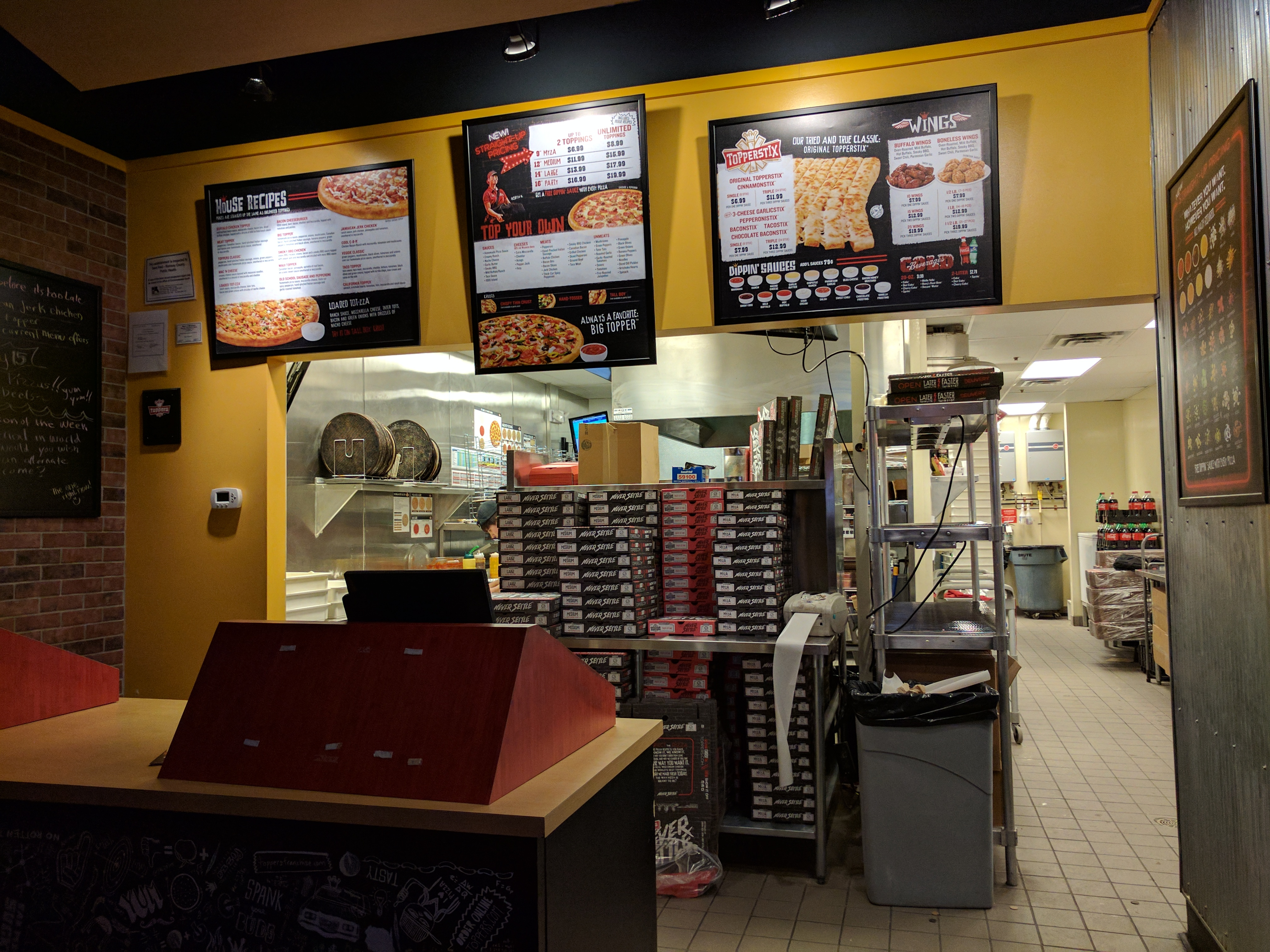
- Toppers Pizza in Falcon Heights, Minnesota
- Company type: Franchise
- Industry: Quick Service Restaurant
- Founded: Champaign, Illinois, United States (1991; 35 years ago)
- Headquarters: Whitewater, Wisconsin, United States
- Key people: Adam Oldenburg, CEO; Kendall Richmond, CFO
- Products: Pizza, Topperstix, Wings
- Website: www.toppers.com

Toppers Pizza is a chain of pizza restaurants in the United States. The company was founded by Scott Gittrich in 1991 in Champaign, Illinois, with the first Toppers Pizza location opened in 1993 in Whitewater, Wisconsin, where the company is headquartered today. and the first franchise store opened in Eau Claire in 1997.

== History ==
There are Toppers Pizza franchises throughout the United States. The chain includes both company-owned locations and franchise stores. It has more than 70 locations in the states of Indiana, Illinois, Minnesota, North Carolina, Ohio, Nebraska, Michigan, Texas, Virginia, Wisconsin, South Dakota, South Carolina, and Kansas. The chain's target market is college-aged students and other customers between 18 and 34 years old. As part of its targeting of college students, most of the chain's stores remain open until 3:00 a.m. or later to accommodate late-night business. As of March 7, 2017, it was reported that all Toppers Pizza locations in Illinois closed as part of a restructuring.

Toppers founder Scott Gittrich entered the pizza business in 1984 when he was a college student at the University of Illinois and took a job as a Domino's Pizza delivery driver. He rose through the company, serving as director of operations for a group of 22 franchise locations in Charlotte, North Carolina, when he left in 1991 to start his own pizza business.

In the late 1990s, the company resolved legal challenges to the use of its name and "Toppers" is a registered trademark of the company. The company name is intended to convey its reputation for numerous and unusual pizza toppings.

== Reception ==
In 2013, the business was named as one of Nation's Restaurant News' 50 Breakout Chains for 2013, was ranked by Entrepreneur magazine as one of the top 500 franchises in the United States and was ranked at #58 of the top 100 pizza companies by Pizza Today.

== See also ==
- List of pizza chains of the United States
