= Mountain Mike's Pizza =

Pizzeria chain in the United States

Mountain Mike’s Pizza

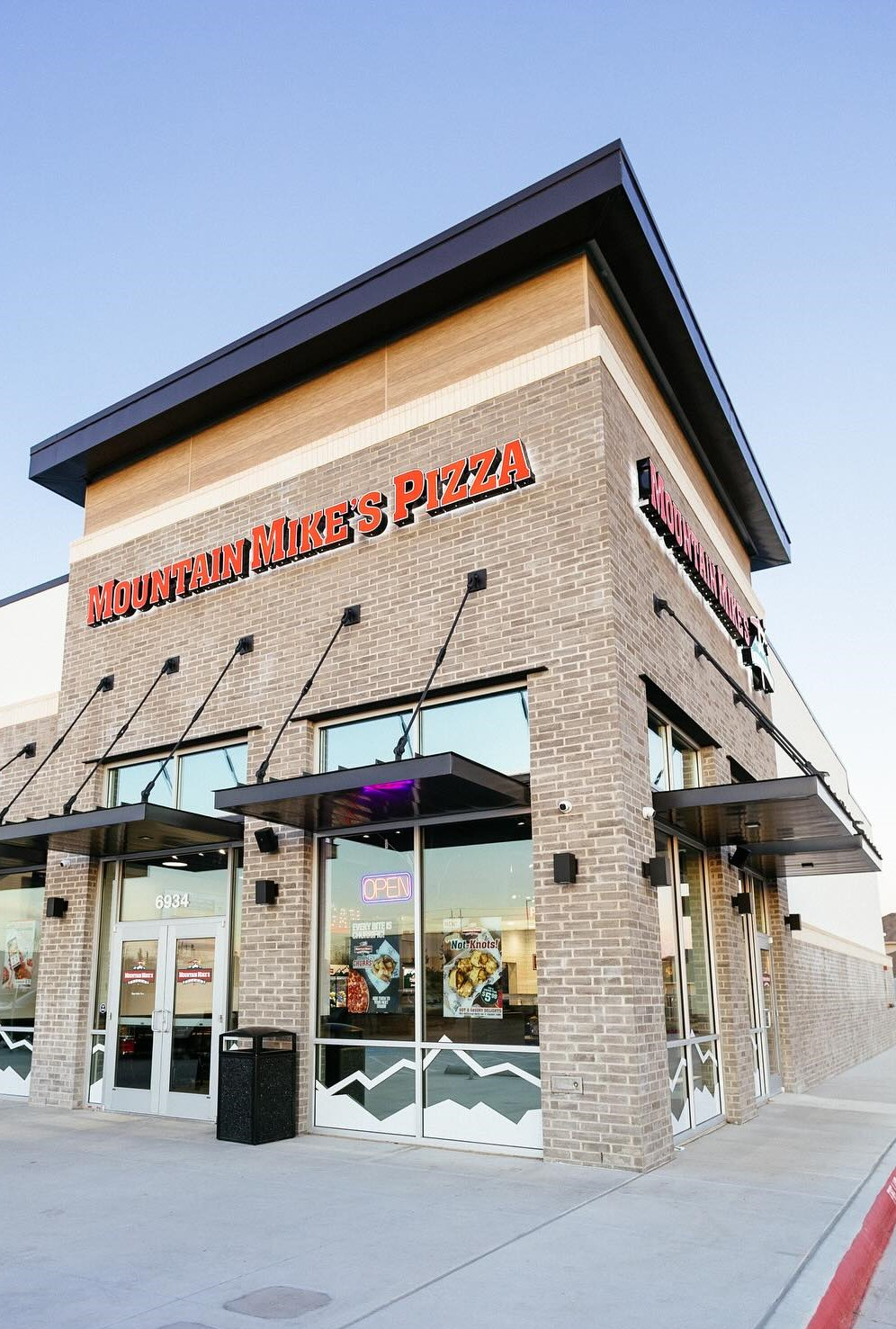
- Mountain Mike’s Pizza Saginaw TX
- Type: Private
- Industry: Fast food restaurants
- Genre: Restaurants
- Founded: 1978; 48 years ago in Palo Alto, California
- Founder: Thomas Buskirk
- Headquarters: Newport Beach, California, United States
- Number of locations: 300+
- Key people: Jim Metevier (CEO)
- Products: Pizza, wings, salad bar, other items
- Revenue: $1.1M avg/location (2022)
- Net income: ($1.1M average/location (2022) 2023 System Sales $297M)
- Owner: Chris Britt & Ed St. Geme
- Website: mountainmikespizza.com

Mountain Mike's Pizza is a chain of franchise pizzerias mainly along the West Coast of the United States, primarily in Northern California. They have additional locations in Arizona, Colorado, Nevada, Oregon, Utah, Texas, Washington, Wisconsin, and Idaho. The restaurants offer other items, such as chicken wings, garlic sticks, dessert pizzas, as well as a lunch buffet and salad bar.

They also have locations in Southern California, including Los Angeles, Inland Empire and Orange County and five locations in San Diego. As of November 10, 2023, Mountain Mike's has 300 locations in 10 States.

== History ==
The first Mountain Mike's was opened in 1978 by Thomas Van Buskirk in Palo Alto, California. The company was acquired by Chris Britt and Ed St. Geme in 2017. The franchise started with one pizza place, and over 45 years, it grew into a brand with nearly 300 locations in the western United States, like California, Arizona, Nevada, Oregon, Utah, Idaho, Texas, Colorado, Washington, and Wisconsin. Chris Britt, a California native from Orange County, held ownership of Mountain Mike's Pizza alongside his college friend Ed St. Geme in 2017. They both surpassed the 200-unit milestone and doubling new-unit growth in 2018. His previous ventures include ownership of well-established businesses like Boot Barn and Signature Theaters. Additionally, Britt and St. Geme co-own "Juice It Up!", a Southern California-based franchisor.

On 21 March 2024, the chain received FRANdatas annual TopScore FUND Award "for its industry-leading support of access to financing and lending opportunities for franchisees."

On October 3, 2025, Yelp included Mountain Mike's on their Top Pizza Brands in America, coming in at #6.
