= Rosati's =

American restaurant franchisor

Rosati's Pizza Enterprises, Inc.
- Type: Private
- Industry: Restaurant
- Founded: 1926; 100 years ago
- Founder: Saverio Rosati
- Headquarters: Geneva, Illinois
- Revenue: ▲US$211 million (2018)
- Website: myrosatispizza.com

Rosati's Pizza Enterprises, Inc., doing business as Rosati's Pizza, is an American casual dining restaurant chain specializing in Chicago-style pizza. Its headquarters is in Geneva, Illinois. There are more than 200 locations across the United States, with more than a third of them in Illinois. Rosati's has over $211 million in revenue and was founded in 1926 by Saverio Rosati at the corner of Pulaski and Madison in Chicago's west side. That location closed down and in 1964 reopened in Mount Prospect, IL. By 1995, Saverio's five sons, Fred, Richard, Al, Bill and Ronald, had grown the company to become the fourth largest pizza chain in the Chicago area, only behind Pizza Hut, Domino's and Little Caesars. In 2018, they were listed as number 21 on Pizza Today's list of the top 100 pizzerias.

With an increase of sales in 2019, Rosati's was ranked in the top twenty of Pizza Today's list of "America’s 100 Largest Pizza Chains".

There are two competing restaurant chains using the Rosati's name as the result of "an unfortunate family quarrel".
