= Cottage Inn Pizza =

American pizza franchise delivery company

Cottage Inn Gourmet Pizza
- Type: Private
- Industry: Restaurants
- Founded: Ann Arbor, Michigan in 1948; 78 years ago
- Headquarters: Ann Arbor, Michigan
- Number of locations: 50+
- Area served: United States (Michigan, Ohio)
- Products: Pizza; Submarine sandwiches; Pasta; Desserts; Salads; Gluten free products
- Website: cottageinn.com

Cottage Inn Pizza is a family-owned, family-operated American pizza franchise delivery company, headquartered in Ann Arbor, Michigan. The first Cottage Inn restaurant opened in 1948. There are over 50 stores in operation in Michigan and Ohio.

== History ==
=== The Original Cottage Inn ===
The original Cottage Inn restaurant opened at 512 East William St. in 1948, near the University of Michigan campus. It was a coffee business that eventually included pizza. It was the first establishment to serve pizza in Ann Arbor. The building was purchased by the Michos family in 1961, and was listed for sale in 2023, as the owner decided to retire.

Three modifications were made to the restaurant in 1975, 1980, and 1993. A second story was added to the restaurant to provide services for banquet rooms.

=== Cottage Inn Carryout ===
By 1978, Cottage Inn had established Cottage Inn Carryout & Delivery Inc., devoted to delivery services. The first Cottage Inn store under this new company was founded at Packard and Hill streets in Ann Arbor. In June 1986, the first franchise opened in Ypsilanti. In 2003, the new corporate headquarters and distribution center opened in Ann Arbor. In 2017, Cottage Inn opened a franchise location in China.

=== Franchises ===
The first franchise was granted in 1986. Early in 2014, Cottage Inn revealed a proposal to use a franchising business model to grow nationally. As of 2022, it had 44 company-owned stores and nine independently franchised locations, and annual sales totaled US $66 million. In 2023, it was named in Entrepreneur magazine's "Franchise 500 List". The company credits training in social media and digital marketing for its growth.

== Sponsorships and community support ==
In 2012, Cottage Inn partnered with the Michigan International Speedway to become the official pizza vendor on NASCAR weekends. The Cottage Inn's original plan of 24-hour delivery service was scaled back due to logistical and staffing issues. Cottage Inn also serves as a pizza vendor for other events held at the Michigan International Speedway, including the Faster Horses Festival.

== Food ==
Cottage Inn sells Italian and Greek food. Its Cuban pizza, part of the pickle pizza trend, placed in the gourmet pizza category at the 2015 North American Pizza Show.
