= Pizza Factory =

Chain of pizza restaurants

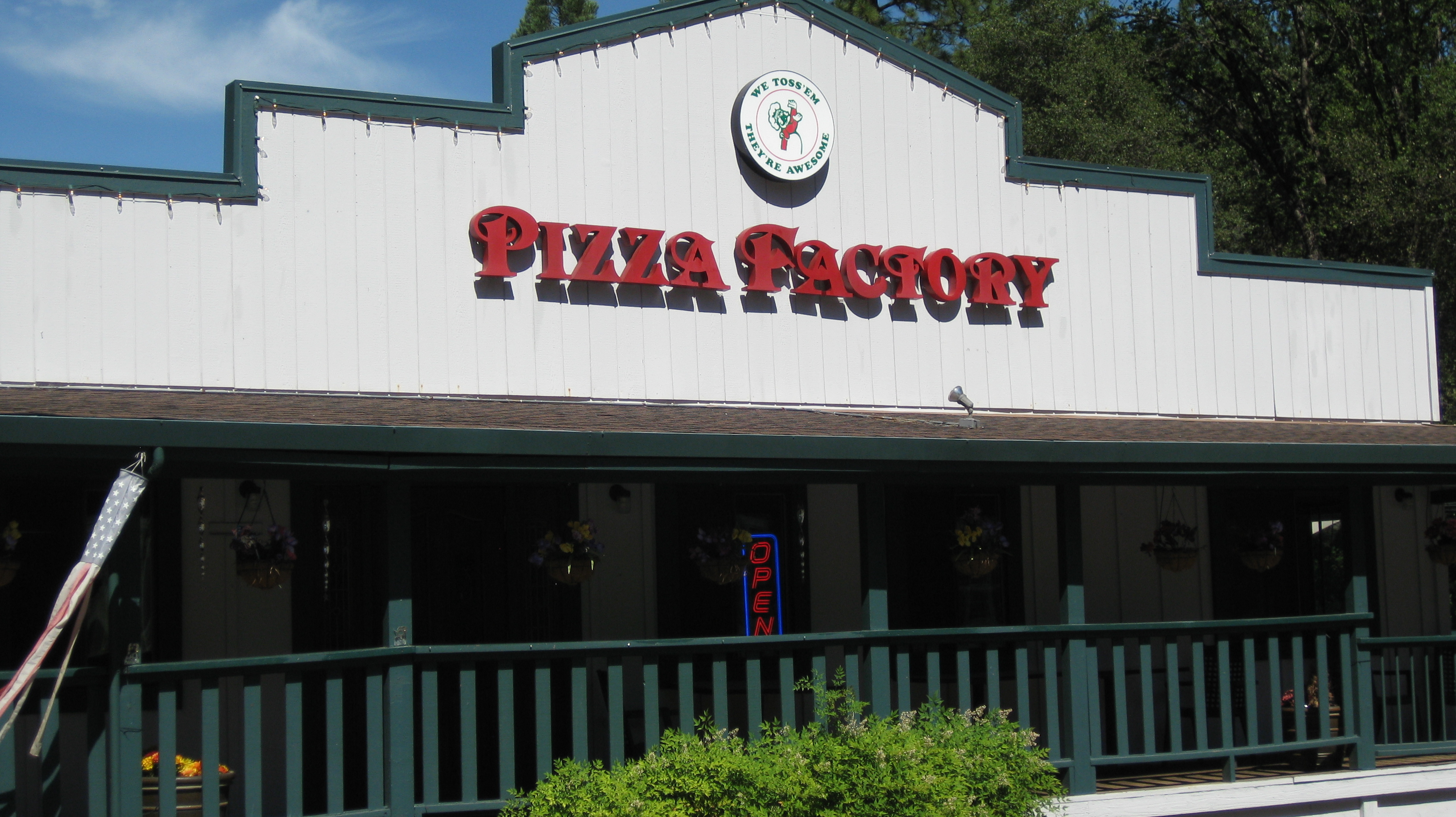
- Pizza Factory in Groveland, California
- Industry: Restaurants
- Founded: 1979; 47 years ago in Oakhurst, California, US (as Danny's Red Devil Pizza)
- Founder: Danny Wheeler; Carol Wheeler
- Headquarters: Oakhurst, California, United States
- Number of locations: 108 (2026)
- Areas served: Western United States
- Key people: Lisa Roscoe ( chief executive officer)
- Products: Pizzas and other food
- Revenue: $93.7 million (2025)
- Owner: Wonder Franchises
- Website: pizzafactory.com

Pizza Factory is a chain of pizza restaurants in the western United States, based in Oakhurst, California. The company began in 1979, when Danny Wheeler and his wife Carol opened Danny's Red Devil Pizza in Oakhurst. Ron Willey and his wife Joyce subsequently opened a second location in 1981, known as Pizza Factory.

In 1986, Wheeler and Willey began franchising the company under the Pizza Factory name. By 2000, the company had expanded throughout the western U.S. In 2012, longtime franchisee and marketing team member Mary Jane Riva purchased the company and became its president and chief executive officer. In January, 2025, Wonder Franchises purchased the company, and in July, 2025 Lisa Roscoe became its chief executive officer. As of 2026, Pizza Factory had 108 locations in five U.S. states.

== History ==
=== Early history ===
In 1979, Danny Wheeler and his wife Carol purchased a pizza restaurant for $5,000; they opened it as Danny's Red Devil Pizza, located on California State Route 41 in Oakhurst, California, near Yosemite National Park. Ron Willey and his wife Joyce were frequent customers at the restaurant. In 1981, the Willeys opened a second location in Mariposa, California, known as Pizza Factory.

By 1982, the Wheelers and the Willeys had been approached by friends who desired to open their own Pizza Factory restaurants. The couples allowed the use of the Pizza Factory name for a fee and also helped to set up the new restaurants in small towns across the San Joaquin Valley. Carol Wheeler and Joyce Willey wanted to protect the food's consistency and convinced their husbands to begin franchising the company starting in 1986. Danny Wheeler and Ron Willey owned the company with their wives. The couples chose to open their restaurants in small towns with fewer than 15,000 people.

The overall investment for franchisees is between $344,000 to $924,000, including a $25,000 franchise fee. The company charges a five-percent royalty fee, which is considered low to average in comparison to similar franchises. Most of the restaurants were designed to allow customers to watch as the dough is being hand-tossed. Each franchisee is encouraged to add local memorabilia and photos to their restaurant, as well as participate in community events and to support local sports teams. Joyce Willey said about the company's focus on local communities, "It's a throwback to when neighbors knew one another. Our customers are like family."

In 1988, the chain had 36 franchise restaurants, located in California, Arizona, Idaho, and Oregon. Willey said that the company's goal was to add 20 to 25 new restaurant locations each year, with no more than that, as the two couples desired to keep the company small enough to continue overseeing it themselves. The couples' ultimate ideal goal was to have 200 locations by 1992. While most locations had little or no competition, the couples stated that this was not the reason for the success of each franchise. Three training schools were established to teach franchisees about the company and about operating one of its restaurants. The company also sponsored an annual convention, as well as semiannual regional meetings. Each quarter, a field director who was also a franchise owner would inspect each location for cleanliness, uniformity, and consistency of food preparation. As of 1988, Entrepreneur rated Pizza Factory at number 485 on its list of the top 500 franchises in the United States. The magazine noted that it was unusual for a two-year-old company to be included on the list.

By May 1989, the company had grown to include 45 restaurants, located in small towns across six states: Arizona, California, Florida, Idaho, Oregon and Washington. At that time, Pizza Factory had launched its first promotional campaign consisting of television, newspaper and radio advertisements, as well as billboards. Pizza Factory had increased its position to number 454 on Entrepreneur's list of the top 500 franchisors in the United States. Rather than expand to additional states, the company planned to focus on opening additional locations in the six states in which it was already operating.

=== 2012 sale and expansion plans ===
In September 2012, Wheeler and Willey sold the company for an undisclosed amount to Mary Jane Riva, a longtime franchisee and a resident of Murrieta, California. Riva then became the new president and chief executive officer of the company, which had 111 restaurant locations in five western U.S. states. Riva had purchased her first Pizza Factory franchise in Murrieta in 1989; she later sold it, and had owned four other Pizza Factory restaurants, including two in California at the time that she took over the company. During the decade leading up to her company purchase, Riva had joined the Pizza Factory's marketing team and helped to expand the company's presence in southern California.

In January 2013, Riva had plans to reduce operating costs while increasing consumer traffic through television commercials and direct mail advertisements. Riva also planned to open 15 to 20 new stores throughout the western United States by the end of 2013, with some locations in larger cities. For each restaurant, Riva also launched an anti-bullying campaign known as "No Bully Zone", to raise awareness of school bullying. Riva had previously started the program at her Pizza Factory restaurant in Temecula, California in 2009. T-shirts were sold at each restaurant location to promote the program. The company's anti-bullying message was also promoted through billboards and school videos.

Riva had plans to open 20 additional locations in 2014, and reached the halfway mark that June. The company received its first makeover that year with the unveiling of new dinnerware, menus, merchandise, and signs. Riva also revived the company's concept of an open kitchen, allowing customers to watch as pizza dough is tossed by the cooks. The company's slogan is, "We Toss 'Em, They're Awesome!" By the end of 2014, Pizza Factory had plans to expand into Montana and Canada. In 2015, the company's revenue totaled $60.3 million, nearly $10 million more than the previous year. In late October 2015, Pizza Factory reentered Oregon with the opening of a new location.

In August 2016, Pizza Factory had 115 locations in six states: Arizona, California, Idaho, Nevada, Oregon, and Washington. Riva hoped to double the number of locations over the next five years. That month, the company announced plans to expand its presence in Twin Falls, Idaho. At that time, while newer pizza chains had focused on Millennials as their target demographic, Pizza Factory remained focused on its concept of a restaurant for family and friends. Riva stated that some of the company's most successful restaurants were located in small towns. As of August 2016, Pizza Factory was the 41st largest chain in the United States.

In August 2017, Pizza Factory partnered with the San Jose Sharks, a National Hockey League team. Through the partnership, Pizza Factory became the sole provider of pizza during events at San Jose's SAP Center, beginning the following month. The partnership also planned to raise awareness about the Pizza Factory's "No Bully Zone" program, and about men's health issues. As of October 2017, the company has 110 restaurant locations. Most recently, the company had signed a deal to open in California's Central Valley.

=== 2025 Sale ===
In January 2025, Mary Jane Riva sold the company to Wonder Franchises. In July 2025, Lisa Roscoe was appointed the new chief executive officer of the company, which has 108 restaurant locations in five western U.S. states.

== Products ==
In addition to pizza, the chain also serves calzones, sandwiches, soups, and appetizers, including chicken wings and "Breadstix." Pizzas are made from hand-tossed dough, which is prepared fresh daily at each restaurant. Pizza sizes range from 8 to 16 inches. Specialty pizzas include the Factory Special, Awesome Combo, All Meat, Artichoke & Garlic, and Western-Style BBQ Chicken. Some locations include a pizza and salad buffet. In January 2015, a poll of 1,239 people ranked Pizza Factory at number nine on The Daily Meal's list of "America's Favorite Pizza Chains."
