= Figaro's Pizza =

International Italian quick service restaurant chain

Figaro's Italian Pizza, Inc.
- Formerly: Italian Pizza, Inc.
- Company type: private
- Industry: restaurant
- Genre: quick service restaurant; Italian
- Founded: 1981; 45 years ago in Salem, Oregon, United States
- Founders: Corkey Gorley; Al DeBacker
- Headquarters: 1500 Liberty Street SE (Suite 160), Salem, Oregon, United States
- Number of locations: 37
- Areas served: Cyprus; United States; Nigeria
- Key people: Ron Berger; chairman, chief executive officer; Jeff Rode; president; Holly Earle-Schultze; director of marketing
- Products: pizzas; calzones; sandwiches; salads; take-and-bake; pasta
- Subsidiaries: Nick-N-Willy's Pizza
- Website: Figaro's Pizza

Figaro's Pizza is an American multinational quick service restaurant chain serving Italian cuisine. The company has 37 locations in 4 countries, including Cyprus, the United States and Nigeria.

== History ==
Figaro's Pizza was founded in Salem, Oregon in 1981 by Corkey Gorley and Al DeBacker. The company is partnered with H.E.L.P. the Charity.

In 2006, Figaro's acquired Sargo's Subs. In 2008, Figaro's acquired Schmizza International, and Nick-N-Willy's franchise in 2012. Figaro's spun off Schmizza in 2014 as an independently owned business.

In 2019, Entrepreneur listed Figaro's Pizza at number twenty on the magazine's list of the top pizza franchises of the year.
