= Cuisine of Michigan =

Cuisine of the Midwestern United States

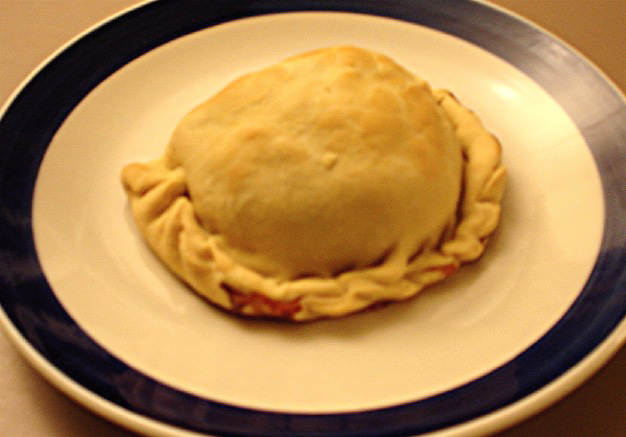
A pasty, a cultural icon of Michigan's Upper Peninsula

The cuisine of Michigan is part of the broader regional cuisine of the Midwestern United States. It is reflective of the diverse food history of settlement and immigration in the state, and draws its culinary roots most significantly from the cuisines of Central, Northern and Eastern Europe, and Native North America.

== Agriculture ==
Michigan is a leading grower of fruit in the U.S., including blueberries, tart cherries, apples, grapes, and peaches. Plums, pears, and strawberries are also grown in Michigan. These fruits are mainly grown in West Michigan due to the moderating effect of Lake Michigan on the climate. There is also significant fruit production, especially cherries, but also grapes, apples, and other fruits, in Northwest Michigan along Lake Michigan. Michigan produces wines, beers and a multitude of processed food products. This wide variety of crops grown in Michigan make it second only to California among U.S. states in the diversity of its agriculture. The state has 54,800 farms utilizing 10,000,000 acres (40,000 km^{2}) of land which sold $6.49 billion worth of products in 2010. The most valuable agricultural product is milk. Leading crops include corn, soybeans, flowers, wheat, sugar beets, and potatoes. Livestock in the state included 78,000 sheep, a million cattle, a million hogs, and more than three million chickens. Livestock products accounted for 38% of the value of agricultural products while crops accounted for the majority.

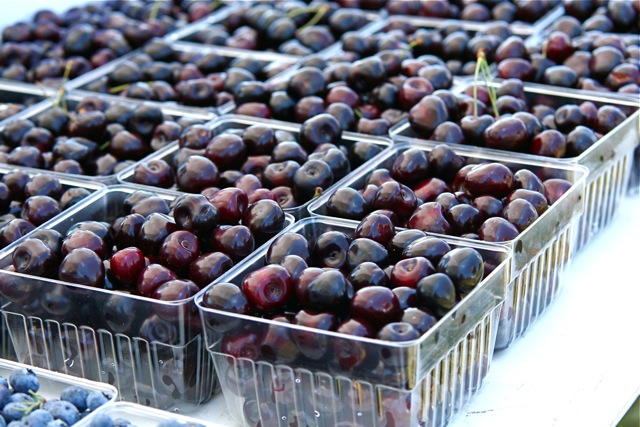
Michigan is the leading U.S. producer of tart cherries, blueberries, pickling cucumbers, navy beans and petunias.

== Metro Detroit ==
The city of Detroit and surrounding metropolitan area is known for its wide variety of food items. The area's specialties include Coney Island hot dogs, found at hundreds of unaffiliated "Coney Island" restaurants. Not to be confused with a chili dog, a coney is served with a ground beef sauce, chopped onions and mustard. The Coney Special has an additional ground beef topping. It is often served with French fries. Food writers Jane and Michael Stern call out Detroit as the only "place to start" in pinpointing "the top Coney Islands in the land."

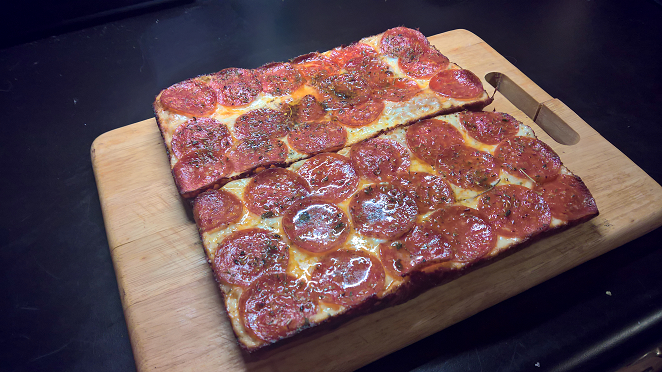
Detroit-style pizza

Detroit also has its own style of pizza, a thick-crusted, Sicilian cuisine-influenced, rectangular type called Detroit-style Pizza. Other Detroit foods include zip sauce, served on steaks; the triple-decker Dinty Moore sandwich, corned beef layered with lettuce, tomato and Russian dressing; and a Chinese-American dish called warr shu gai or almond boneless chicken. Many pizza chains have had their start in or around Detroit, including Little Caesars, Jet's Pizza, Hungry Howie's Pizza, and Domino's Pizza in nearby Ypsilanti. Two of those chains, Little Caesars and Domino's Pizza, are both in the top three largest pizza chains in the United States.

Detroit also has a substantial number of Greek restaurateurs. Thus, numerous Mediterranean restaurants dot the region and typical foods such as gyros, hummus and falafel can be found in many run-of-the-mill grocery stores and restaurants.

Polish food is also prominent in the state, including popular dishes such as pierogi, borscht, and pączki (/ˈpuːnʃ.kiː/ POONSH-kee). Bakeries concentrated in the Polish enclave of Hamtramck, Michigan, within the city, are celebrated for their pączki, especially on Fat Tuesday. Hungarian food is featured in nearby eastern Toledo, Ohio with Tony Packo's Hungarian hot dog, a form of kolbász.

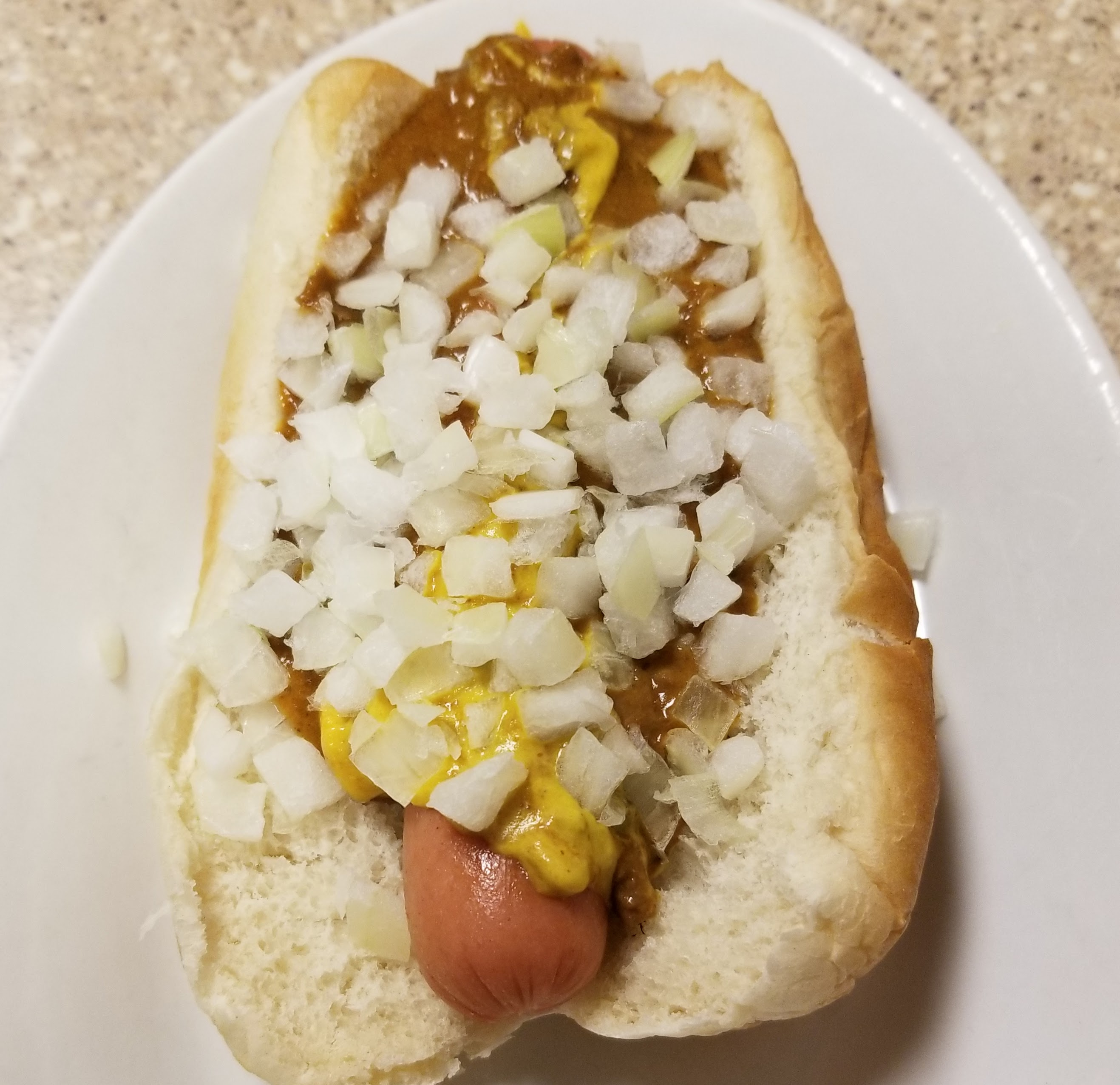
A Detroit-style Coney dog

Chinese restaurants in the Detroit area serve almond boneless chicken, a regional Chinese-American dish consisting of battered fried boneless chicken breasts served sliced on a bed of lettuce with a gravy-like chicken flavored sauce and slivered almonds.

The Detroit area has many large groups of immigrants. A large Arabic-speaking population reside in and around the suburb of Dearborn, home to many Lebanese storefronts.

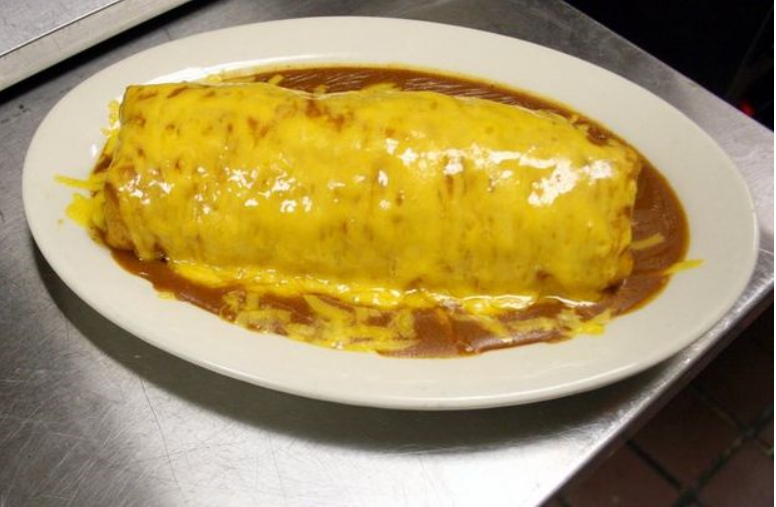
A wet burrito, said to have originated in Grand Rapids

== Lower Peninsula ==
In Ann Arbor, the Chipati, a tossed salad, is served inside a freshly baked pita pocket with the "secret" Chipati sauce on the side. The Chipati's origination is claimed by both Pizza Bob's. Ann Arbor is also famous for their “Hippie Hash”, a vegetarian breakfast dish consisting of fried potatoes, vegetables, and feta cheese, which originated at Fleetwood Diner in the 60’s. The name is a nod to the city’s counterculture movement, which was embraced in the 60’s and led to the city being the first in Michigan to have legalized marijuana and psychedelic mushrooms.

Dutch cuisine, especially baked goods, are common in West Michigan, especially Ottawa County, due to the high number of Dutch immigrants to the area. Also famous to the area is the wet burrito, which is said to have been created in Grand Rapids in 1966.

Additionally, German cuisine is fairly common in the area of Frankenmuth, with multiple restaurants in Frankenmuth serving German food, including those at the Bavarian Inn.

The Northwestern Lower Peninsula, specifically the Traverse City area, is world-renowned for its cherry production. Harvesting over 90,000 tons of cherries each year, Michigan is the nation's leading producer of tart cherries. The Montmorency cherry is the variety of tart, or sour, cherry most commonly grown in the state. A Hungarian sour cherry cultivar, Balaton, has been commercially produced in Michigan since 1998. Additionally, Traverse City hosts the National Cherry Festival each July, and is commonly known as the "Cherry Capital of the World".

The city of Pinconning is known as the "Cheese Capital of Michigan". This is because Pinconning is locally noted for its former production of cheese and cheese products, especially Pinconning cheese, made and distributed by Pinconning Cheese Company and Wilson's (Horn) Cheese Shoppe.

== Upper Peninsula ==
The Upper Peninsula has a distinctive local cuisine. The pasty (/ˈpæstiː/ PASS-tee), a kind of meat turnover originally brought to the region by Cornish miners, is arguably the most famous food of the Upper Peninsula. Pasty restaurants and shops line highways across the peninsula. Varieties include chicken, venison, pork, hamburger, and pizza, all of which many restaurants serve. Many U.P. restaurants also serve potato sausage and cudighi, a spicy Italian meat.

Finnish immigrants in the western and central Upper Peninsula contributed nisu, a cardamom-flavored sweet bread; limppu, an Eastern Finnish rye bread; pannukakku, a variant on the pancake with a custard flavor; viili (sometimes spelled "fellia"), a stretchy, fermented Finnish milk; and korppu, hard slices of toasted cinnamon bread, traditionally dipped in coffee. Some Finnish foods such as juusto (squeaky cheese, essentially a cheese curd, like Leipäjuusto) and saunamakkara (a ring-bologna sausage) have become so ubiquitous in Upper Peninsula cuisine that they are now commonly found in most grocery stores and supermarkets.

Maple syrup is a highly prized local delicacy. Fresh Great Lakes fish, such as the lake trout, whitefish, and (in the spring) smelt are widely eaten. Interestingly, there is minimal concern about contamination of fish from Lake Superior waters. Smoked fish is also popular. Thimbleberry jam and chokecherry jelly are a treat.

Trenary Toast is another food with roots in the Upper Peninsula. The snack product hails from Trenary, a small town in Alger County, and consisted of toast coated in a blend of cinnamon and sugar.

Additionally, communities on the peninsula, especially Marquette and Copper Country, are known for their brewery industries.

== Other ==
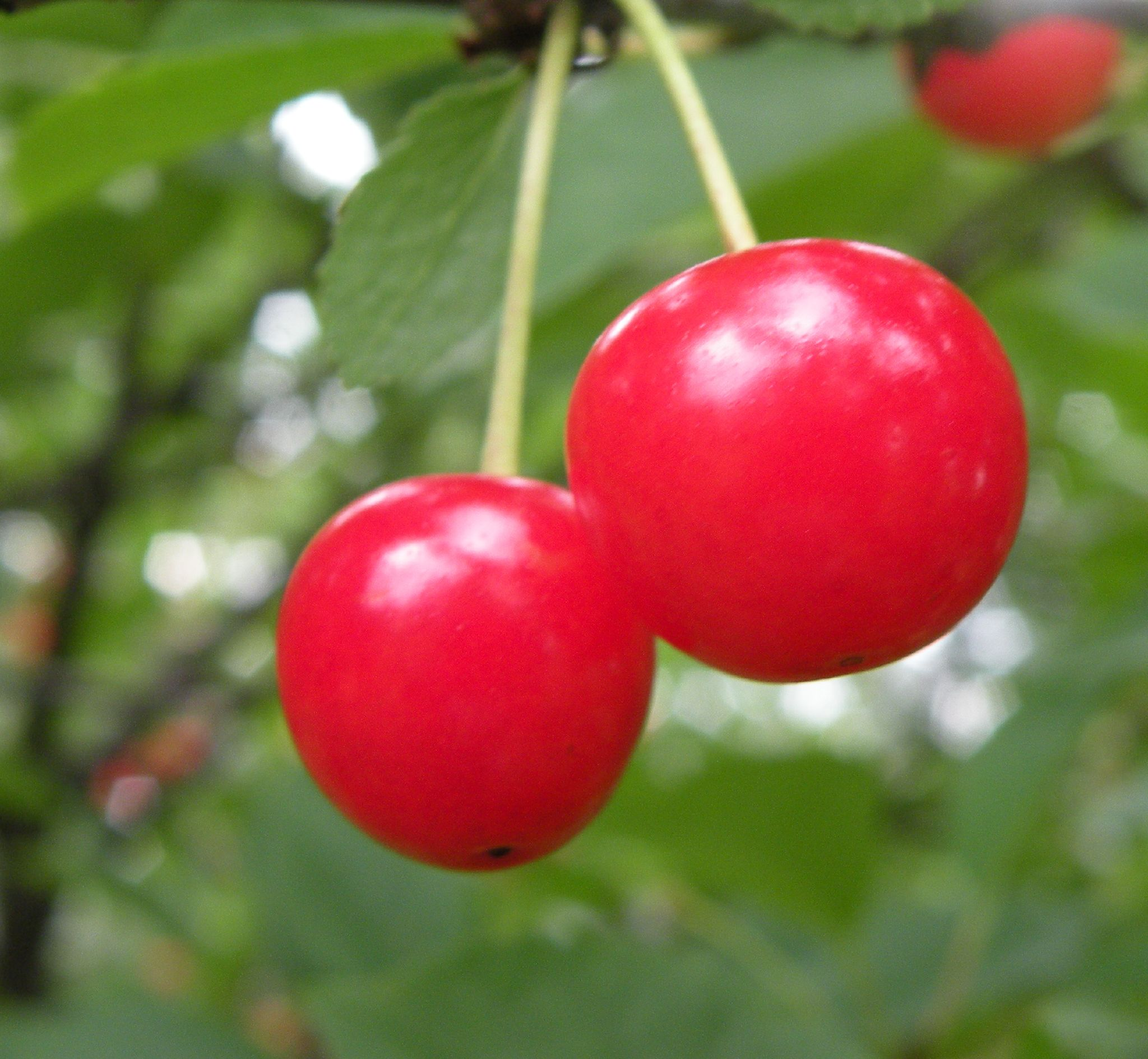
Montmorency cherries, a variety commonly grown in the Traverse City area

Fish fries are common on Fridays and during Lent in Michigan, usually set up buffet-style with items including rolls, potatoes (typically in the form of french fries and mashed), salad, coleslaw, apple sauce, deep-fried fish, and sometimes fried shrimp and baked fish. Fish is generally popular throughout the state due to the state's location on four of the Great Lakes. Trout, walleye, perch, and catfish are common. Whitefish is a regional specialty usually offered along the coast, with smoked whitefish and whitefish dip being noteworthy.

=== Alcohol ===
Michigan's wine and beer industries are substantial in the region. The Traverse City area is a popular destination to visit wineries and the state makes many varieties of wine, such as Rieslings, ice wines, and fruit wines. Micro-breweries continue to blossom, creating a wide range of unique beers. Grand Rapids is known as "Beer City USA", with Founders being the largest of Grand Rapids' breweries. Bell's, another large Michigan craft brewery, is located further south in Kalamazoo, another city known for its breweries.

=== Mackinac Island fudge ===
Mackinac Island, between Michigan's Upper and Lower Peninsulas, is world-renowned for its fudge. Phil Porter wrote a book entitled "Fudge: Mackinac's Sweet Souvenir", which explains how fudge became such a popular treat in Mackinac. After the fur trade in the region collapsed, the island became a summer vacationing spot. Visitors began to associate sweets with the island, originally starting when Native Americans began collecting maple sugar. In 1887, though, the Murdick family opened the first candy shop on the island. Fans were used to send the scent of their fudge out into the community to draw in customers, and the scent of fudge, as well as the increase in shop openings, became commonplace on the island. Additionally, every August, the island hosts the Mackinac Island Fudge Festival. Mackinac Island's visitors became known as "fudgies", a term which has spread to cover any tourists, regardless of whether or not fudge is purchased, across Northern Michigan and the Upper Peninsula. Today, fudge shops are also common in Michigan's tourist towns outside Mackinac Island, such as St. Ignace and Traverse City.

=== Battle Creek cereal ===
W. K. Kellogg, an industrialist, had worked for his brother, John Harvey Kellogg, in a variety of capacities at the sanitarium in Battle Creek. Tired of living in the shadow of his brother, W.K. Kellogg struck out on his own, going to the boom-towns surrounding the oilfields in Oklahoma as a broom salesman. Having failed, he returned to work as an assistant to his brother. While working at the sanitariums' laboratory, W.K. spilled liquefied cornmeal on a heating device that cooked the product and rendered it to flakes. He tasted the flakes and added milk to them. He was able to get his brother to allow him to give some of the product to some of the patients at the sanitarium, and the patients' demand for the product exceeded his expectations to the point that W.K made the decision to leave the sanitarium. Along with some investors, he built a factory to satisfy the demand for his "corn flakes". It was during this time of going their separate ways for good that Dr. John Harvey Kellogg sued his brother for copyright infringement. The U.S. Supreme court ruled in W.K. Kellogg's favor, due to the greater sales and public profile of W.K. Kellogg's company. Inspired by Kellogg's innovation, C. W. Post invented Grape-Nuts and founded his own cereal company in the town. For this reason, Battle Creek has been nicknamed "the Cereal City."

== Companies ==
Below are restaurants, as well as food and beverage companies, founded in or based out of Michigan, unless otherwise specified.

- Abbott's Meat
- Al Ameer Restaurant
- Alpha Michigan Brewing Company
- Alpino
- Bagger Dave's
- Baker's Keyboard Lounge
- Better Made Potato Chips
- Biggby Coffee
- Big Boy Restaurants
- Big John Steak & Onion
- Blackrocks Brewery
- Blimpy Burger
- Buddy's Pizza
- Cafe D'Mongo's Speakeasy
- Cherry Hut
- Ciao Bella Gelato Company
- Coney Island
- Cops & Doughnuts
- Domino's Pizza
- Dortch Enterprises
- Eden Foods Inc.
- Elwood Bar
- Faygo
- Frankenmuth Brewery
- Gerber Products Company
- Haab's Restaurant
- Halo Burger
- Happy's Pizza
- Henry's Hamburgers
- Hot Sam Pretzels
- House of Flavors
- Hungry Howie's Pizza
- Jet's Pizza
- Kar's Nuts
- Kellogg's
- Koegel Meat Company
- Little Caesars
- Mallie's Sports Grill & Bar
- Mindo Chocolate Makers
- Mr. Fables
- Mudgie's Deli
- National Coney Island
- Olga's Kitchen
- Ore Dock Brewing Company
- Ram's Horn
- Riverside Inn
- Russ'
- Sanders Confectionery
- Sidetrack Bar & Grill
- Slows Bar BQ
- Tubby's
- Vernors
- Vlasic Pickles
- YaYa's Flame Broiled Chicken
- Yesterdog
- Zehnder's
- Zingerman's

== See also ==
- Cuisine of the Midwestern United States
- Cherry production in Michigan
