= Morley Candy Company =

American confectionary company

- Formerly: Morley Candy Makers
- Type: Subsidiary
- Industry: Confectionery
- Founded: 1919; 107 years ago
- Founders: Ervin Morley; Julia Morley
- Fate: Acquired by Kar's Nuts
- Headquarters: 23770 Hall Road, Clinton Township, Michigan, United States
- Area served: United States and Canada
- Products: Chocolate, candy
- Brands: Sanders
- Number of employees: 100 year-round; up to 130 seasonally (2007)
- Parent: Second Nature Brands

Morley Candy Company or Morley Candy Makers is a confectioner based in Clinton Township, Michigan. The company, founded in 1919, is famous for its peanut butter blocks and assorted chocolates. Morley Candy owns and markets the Sanders Confectionery line, which is famous for its Bumpy Cakes, sundae topping, and ice cream, particularly in and around Detroit, Michigan. Michigan school children often sell Morley Candy for school fundraisers.

In May 2004, Ronald Rapson became president of Morley Brands LLC.

There are three Morley Candy retail stores in the Metro Detroit area—Clinton Township, Rochester, and Eastpointe.

On October 26, 2006, President George W. Bush made an unannounced visit to Morley's main factory on Hall Road in Clinton Township before attending a political fundraiser. After touring the facility, he bought, amongst other things, a can of Sanders hot fudge sundae topping for himself and his presidential staff.

Kar's Nuts acquired Morley in 2018. The Morley brand is no longer widely used.
