= New Center Commercial Historic District =

Historic district in Michigan, United States

- U.S. National Register of Historic Places
- U.S. Historic district
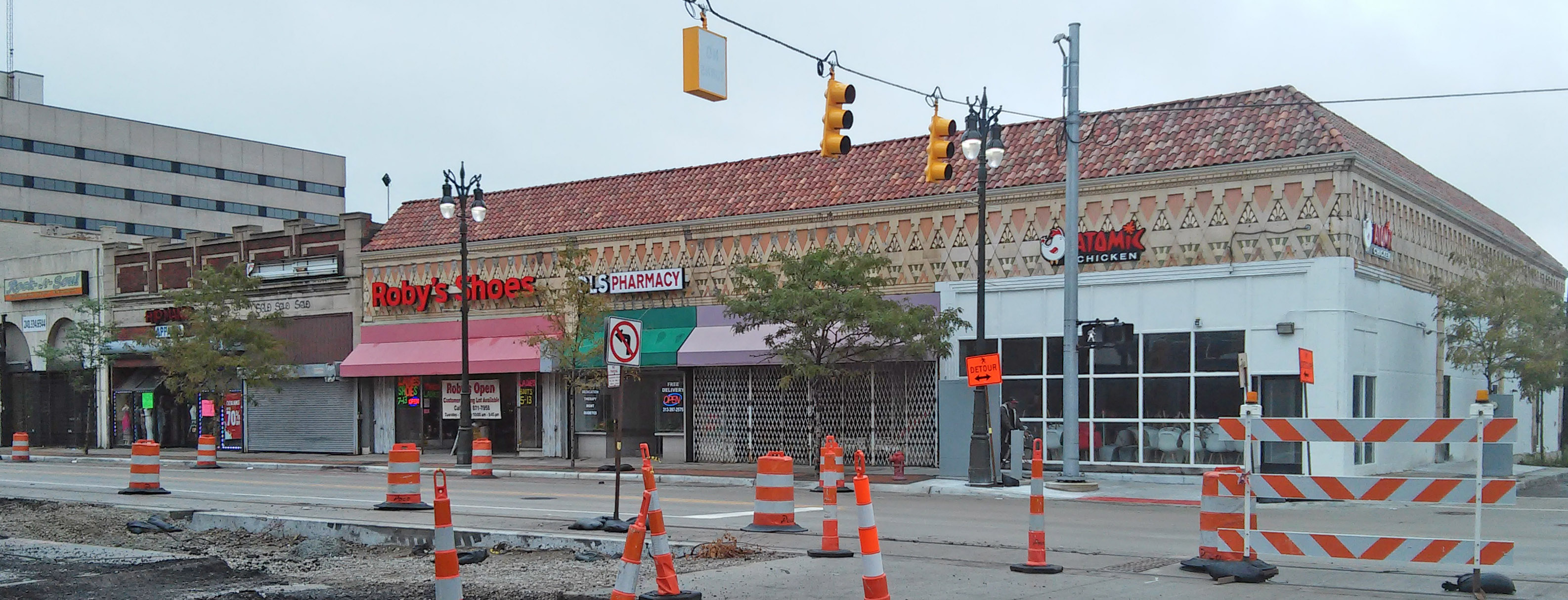
- Woodward and Milwaukee, looking northeast
- Interactive map showing the location for New Center Commercial District
- Location: Woodward Ave, Baltimore St. to Grand Blvd; Detroit, Michigan
- Coordinates: 42°22′10″N 83°4′22″W
- Architects: Albert Kahn, Varney & Winter, O'Dell & Diehl, Hyde & Williams
- Architectural style: Commercial, Neoclassical, Art Deco and Moderne
- NRHP reference No.: 16000218
- Added to NRHP: May 3, 2016

The New Center Commercial Historic District is a commercial historic district located on Woodward Avenue between Baltimore Street and Grand Boulevard (within the New Center) in Detroit, Michigan. It was listed on the National Register of Historic Places in 2016.

== History ==
Woodward Avenue likely began as a Native American trail, but the thoroughfare was firmly established in 1805-1806, when it was included in the master plan for rebuilding Detroit after the 1805 fire. By 1820, Woodward Avenue had been improved from downtown Detroit up through Six Mile Road. By 1878, Detroit suburbs had crept up to the area that is now the New Center Commercial Historic District, and in 1878-1882, a series of subdivisions were platted in the area. Development was hastened by the construction of Grand Boulevard, which began in 1883. In 1885, the city of Detroit annexed all the land within the Grand Boulevard ring, including this district.

The intersection of two main streets - Woodward Avenue and Grand Boulevard - made a natural location for a commercial district. Commercial structures were being constructed in the area by 1884, and by 1889 the east and west sides of Woodward between Milwaukee and Baltimore were already filled with commercial structures. Some of these buildings are still extant in the district. By 1897 commercial development extended north to Grand Boulevard.

Further development occurred in the district around 1915, corresponding to the rise of the automotive industry and the opening of Henry Ford Hospital a few blocks down Grand Boulevard. In 1922, General Motors began construction on a new headquarters building (the General Motors Building just one block west of this district, and in 1927 Fisher Body followed suit, beginning construction of the landmark Fisher Building. These two buildings anchored what the Fisher brothers envisioned as a new central business district - the New Center - that would relieve the congestion in Detroit's primary downtown business district. The late 1920s also saw more redevelopment in the commercial district along Woodward.

In 1936-1937, Woodward Avenue was widened along almost its entire route, including through the New Center. In the process, all but two of the buildings on the west side of Woodward were demolished. The two remaining structures were shortened, with new facades added. New buildings were infilled in the early 1940s. However, the city's population began declining in the 1950s, and the New Center, along with much of the rest of the city, began a slow decline. General Motors, remaining in the area, stabilized the surrounding neighborhood, and the New Center Council, a local business organization created in 1967, ensured that the commercial district was able to survive.

== Description ==
The district contains fourteen contributing structures, as well as one non-contributing building. All structures are one to three-story commercial masonry buildings. The buildings are constructed in a range of architectural styles, including Commercial style, Neoclassical, Art Deco and Moderne. The district is representative of many of the local commercial districts in Detroit which sprung up at the intersections of major streets. However, the New Center area has retained more commercial vitality than many other neighborhood commercial districts, and the buildings within the district maintain a higher degree of integrity. Construction dates range from the late 1880s to 1942. The fifteen buildings in the district include:

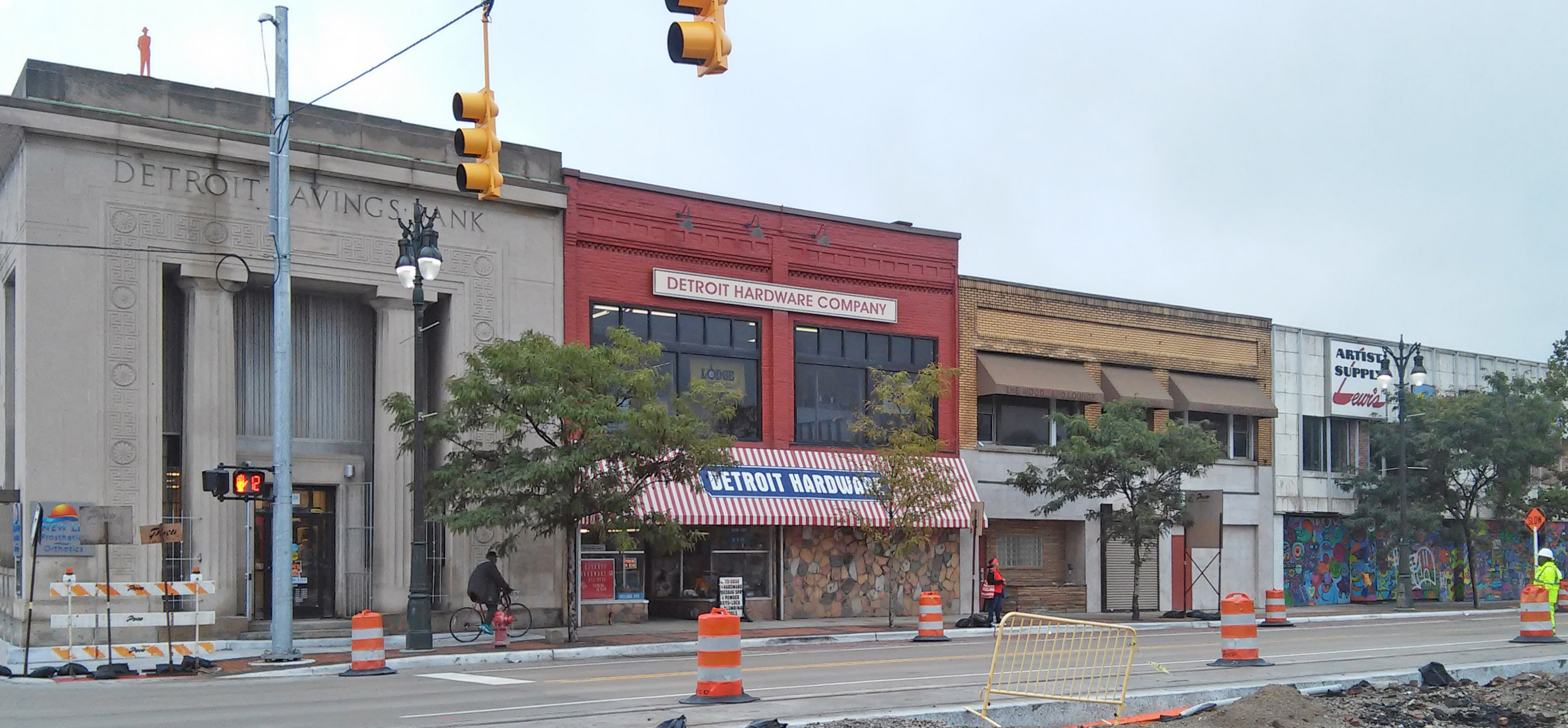
Woodward and Milwaukee, looking southeast

=== East side of Woodward, Baltimore - Milwaukee ===
- 6400-02 Woodward/11-21 West Baltimore Street, 1914 This two-story tall white brick commercial building was constructed in 1914. It has three storefront bays wide facing Woodward and ten bays along Baltimore. The storefronts have been filled with concrete and glass block. The second floor has large window openings with small hopper widows inset into glass block filling. Atop the building is a parapet wall and original metal cornice.
- 6408-16 Woodward, c. 1885 This two-story building was likely originally two separate buildings, both constructed prior to 1889. The building is four bays wide; the first floor storefronts are sided and the second floor is clad in porcelain enamel metal panels with vertical metal strips which divide front of the building into sixteen equal sections.
- 6420-26 Woodward, c. 1885 This is a two-story Commercial style building three bays wide. The entire first floor is clad in square marble tiles and the second floor of the building is faced in yellow brick. The outside bays have wide second floor windows consisting of a single large light flanked by double-hung windows with transoms. The center bay is narrower with just double-hung windows.
- Detroit Hardware (6432 Woodward), c. 1885 This two-story brick commercial building once formed the south half of the Brown Block, the north half of which was demolished to make way for the Detroit Savings Bank in 1916. The storefront is aluminum framed glass with a tile base. The second floor has a large window opening with transom in each half of the building. The Detroit Hardware Company, founded in 1924, moved into this building in 1933 and has occupied the building continuously since then.
- Detroit Savings Bank (6438 Woodward), 1916 the Detroit Savings Bank is two story Neoclassical structure designed by Albert Kahn and built in 1916. It was used by the Detroit Savings Bank until at least 1956. The façade walls are clad in smooth limestone. The front façade has a two-story tall recessed entrance portico containing a central entrance door flanked by Doric columns. The side facing Milwaukee has nine two-story tall narrow openings containing metal frame windows with metal siding above.

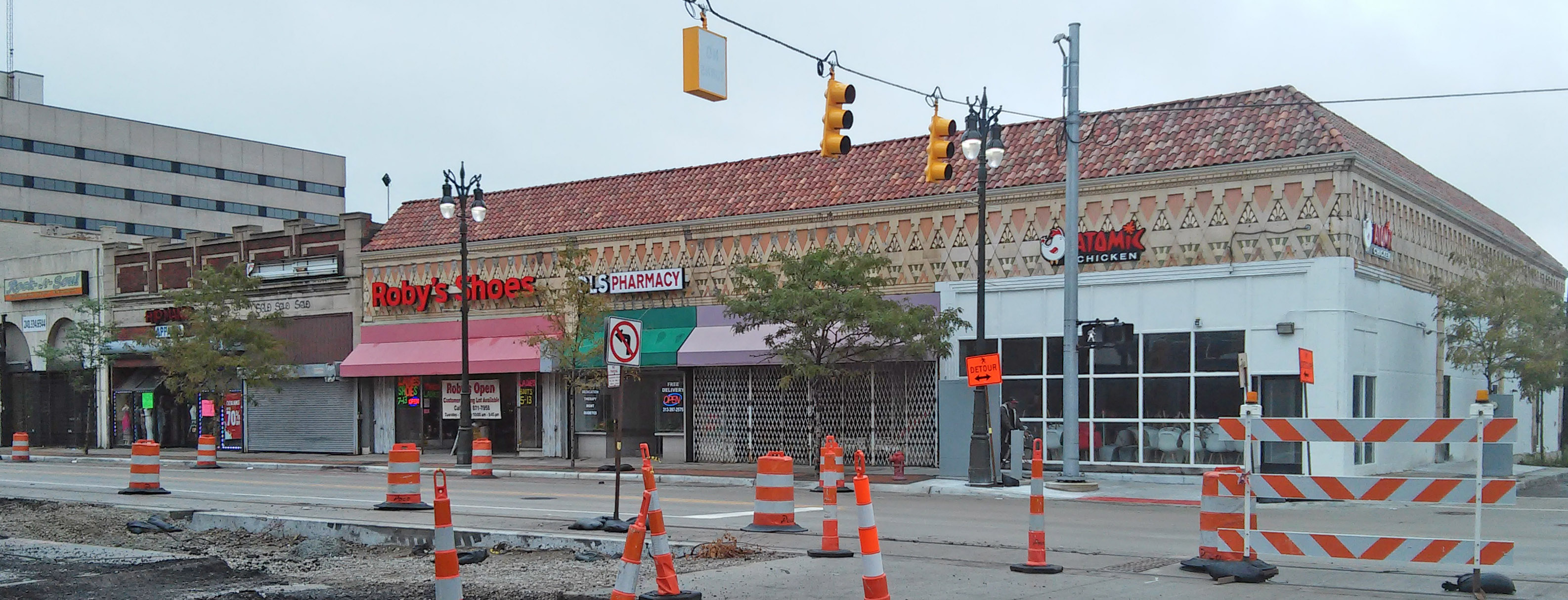
Woodward and Milwaukee, looking northeast

=== East side of Woodward, Milwaukee - Grand Boulevard ===
- Liggett Drug Store (6500 Woodward), 1929 This one-story Art Deco brick building was constructed in 1929 with a brightly colored terra cotta façade and red tile hip roof. The building is split into four storefronts framed with tan colored terra cotta bands, with the wall above covered in orange, green, tan and black terra cotta tiles set in an elaborate multi-colored chevron pattern. The Liggett Drug Store moved into the building in upon opening and remained a tenant building through at least 1940.
- Neisner Brothers (6520 Woodward), 1929 This one-story brick building was constructed in 1929 for Neisner Brothers of Rochester, New York, who remained in the building through at least 1957. The storefront is framed in limestone and limestone panels are inserted in the wall above the storefront.
- Sanders Confectionery (6532-34 Woodward), 1928 – Non-Contributing The Sanders Confectionery building was constructed by Fred Sanders in 1928, and remained a confectionery store until at least 1957. It is a single-story brick commercial building with a metal and glass storefront.
- Center Theater (6538-40 Woodward), c. 1900 This building was constructed as a two-store retail space sometime around 1900. In 1930 it contained a restaurant, and in 1933 one of the stores was converted into the Center Theater. In 1952 the building was converted back into retail space. The upper part of the front is clad in enameled metal panels that now have a stucco-like coating.
- 6550-68 Woodward, c. 1896 This three-story commercial building in the corner of Grand Boulevard and Woodward retains many of its Victorian features. It was originally built around 1896, with an addition built in about 1920. Aluminum-framed glass storefronts occupy the ground floor, and the upper two floors contain five projecting three-sided wood bays with double-hung windows. Atop the building is a parapet wall with a small cornice.

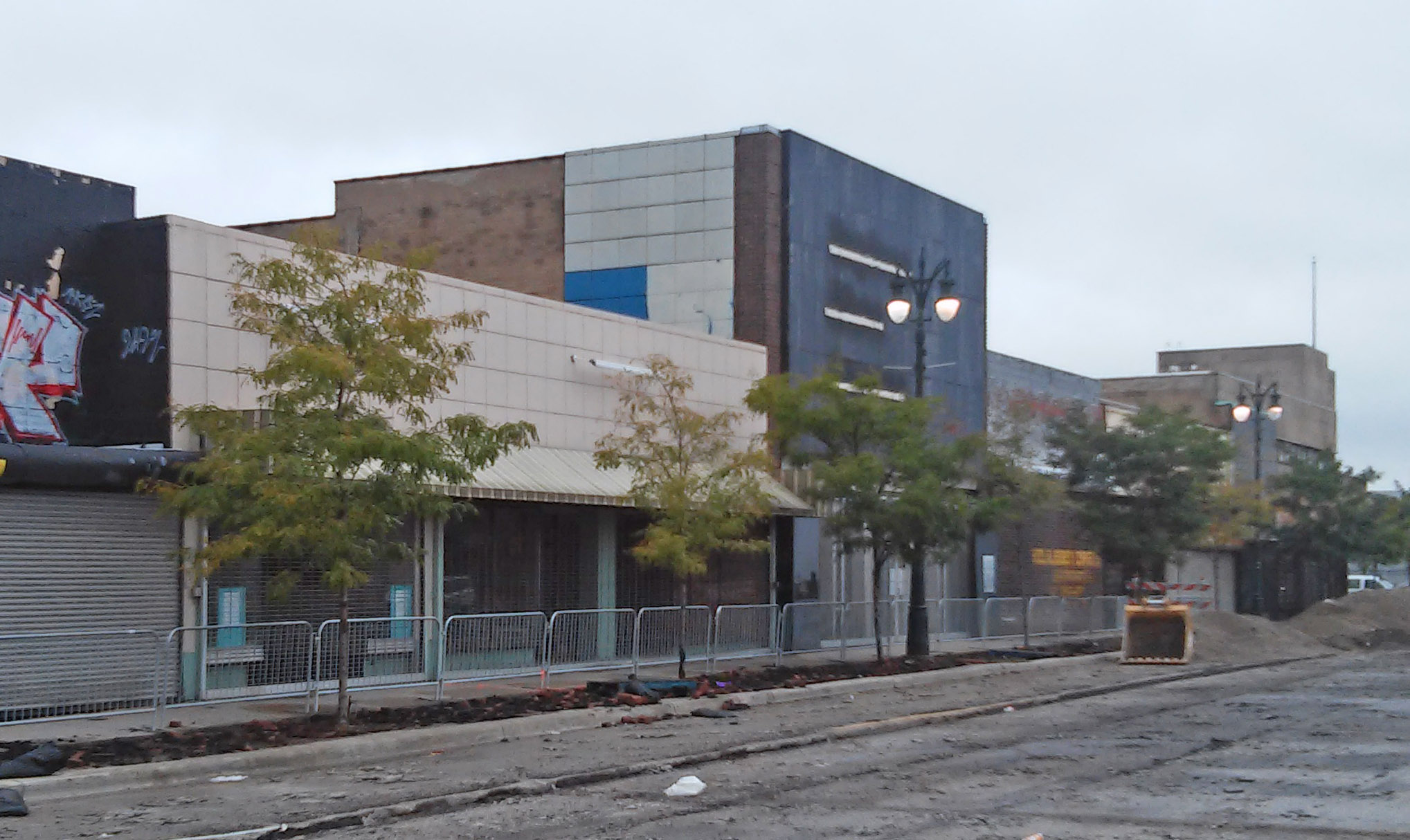
Woodward and Milwaukee, looking northwest

=== West side of Woodward, Milwaukee - Grand Boulevard ===
- Dime Savings Bank, 6501 Woodward, 1915 The Dime Savings Bank is a three-story buff brick building constructed in 1915. In 1941, the front section was removed to accommodate the widening of Woodward Avenue. Enameled metal panels, covering the first floor, were installed in the early 1950s. Five second-floor windows with limestone sills and shallow arch-top openings and are spaced equally across the front façade, and seven similar windows are in the third floor.
- 6513-29 Woodward, 1941 This building is a single story Modern commercial building, originally clad with enameled metal panels, constructed in 1941, after the widening of Woodward Avenue. Some of the front façade has been remodeled with other materials, and the six-storefront wide structure now appears to be three separate buildings.
- Norwood Theater/Sanders Confectionery (6531-35 Woodward), 1915 The Norwood Theater is a two-story building designed by Henry Joy and constructed in 1915. A new façade was applied in 1941 after the widening of Woodward Avenue. In 1952 the theatre was replaced with. In 1966, Fred Sanders moved his Sanders Confectionery from the building across Woodward and opened a store and restaurant in the entire space. The storefront has three concrete arches across the center of the façade, and the upper floor is covered in painted enameled metal panels.
- 6541-49 Woodward, 1941 In 1941, Victor Bressler began construction on this building, which now houses three storefronts of unequal widths.
- F. W. Woolworth Store (6565 Woodward), 1940 In 1940, the Henry Block at the southwest corner of Woodward and West Grand Boulevard was demolished to make room for the widening of Woodward Avenue. This limestone two-story Moderne commercial building was built in its place. The structure was designed by architects Hyde and Williams and built by the Barton-Malow Company to house a Woolworth's department store. The building was constructed with two retail areas. The building was designed with varying roof heights and a square corner tower positioned slightly back from the Woodward facade. The tower has raised decorative blocks in a column near the edge and an original flagpole.

== See also ==
- National Register of Historic Places listings in Detroit, Michigan
