= Ciao Bella =

Ciao Bella ("Hi/Bye Beautiful", in the Italian language) may refer to:

- Ciao Bella (TV series), Canadian television sitcom set in Montreal and broadcast on CBC Television in the 2004-05
- Ciao Bella (film), 2007 film directed by Mani Maserrat Agah
- Ciao Bella!, alternative title for the American reality television series The Simple Life
- "Ciao Bella" (song), Don Omar song
- "Ciao Bella", DJ Hamida song featuring Lartiste from DJ Hamida album Mix party 2018
- "Ciao Bella", Madonna song from the album Madame X
- Ciao Bella Gelato Company, American Italian company specializing in gelatos and sorbets

== See also ==
- "Bella ciao", Italian anti-fascist song
