= Mudgie's Deli =

Restaurant

Coordinates: 42.329°N 83.062°W

- Company type: Private
- Industry: Restaurants
- Founded: 2008
- Headquarters: Detroit, MI
- Key people: Greg Mudge
- Products: Sandwiches, salads, soups, desserts
- Website: www.mudgiesdeli.com

Mudgie's Deli is a restaurant in Detroit, Michigan. It was nominated for "Best Deli" and "Best Soup" two years in a row by WDIV-TV through their "Click On Detroit" website, and won "Best Deli in Wayne County" in the Metro Times "Best of Detroit" in 2010, 2011, 2012, 2013 and 2014, and "Best Sandwich in Wayne County" in 2015. Mudgie's was awarded "Best Sandwich" by Hour Detroit Magazine in 2012.

Mudgie's Deli was founded in February 2008 in Corktown, a small Irish neighborhood in downtown Detroit. The restaurant is located in the space formerly occupied by Eph McNally's. When the owners of McNally's decided to move their location to Woodward Avenue, the restaurant's manager, Greg Mudge, opted to stay in the Corktown location and start his own deli to cater to McNally's existing patrons. Mudge died unexpectedly on September 5, 2021 at the age of 46.

Featuring minimal decor and a lengthy menu, Mudgie's emphasizes Michigan or Detroit made products, such as Faygo beverages, Better Made chips and Sanders Confectionery fudge.

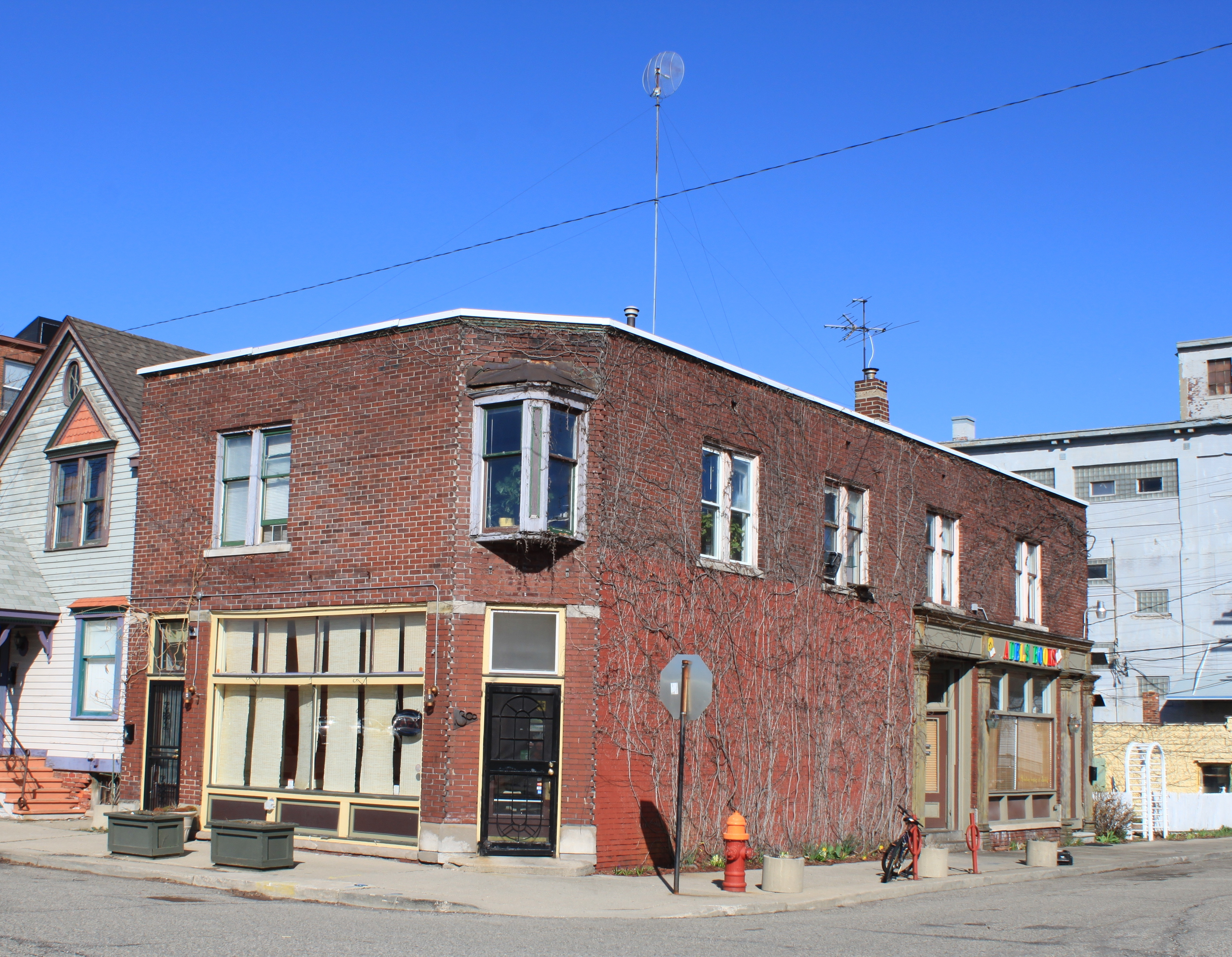
Mudgie's exterior

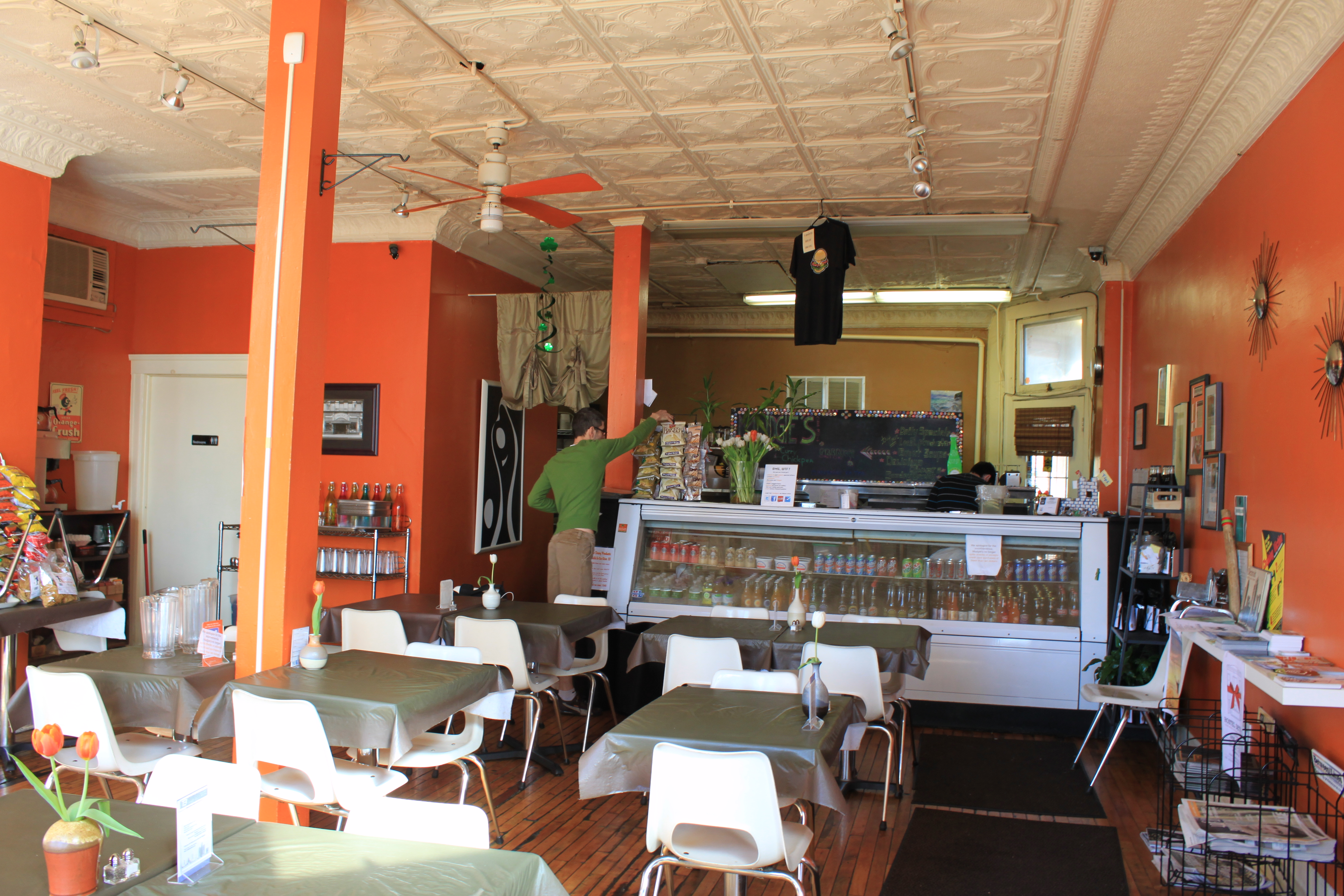
Mudgie's interior
