= Bagger Dave's =

Restaurant chain

Bagger Dave's Burger Tavern Inc.
- Type: Public
- Traded as: BDVB (OTC)
- Industry: Food industry
- Founded: 2008
- Founder: Michael Ansley
- Number of locations: 5
- Products: Fast food, hamburgers, cheeseburgers, macaroni and cheese, milkshakes, beer
- Website: http://www.baggerdaves.com

Bagger Dave's Burger Tavern Inc. is an American restaurant chain that was founded in Michigan in 2008.

== History ==
Bagger Dave's was established in 2008, in Berkley, Michigan, by Michael Ansley, who is also the current CEO of the restaurant chain.

Since its founding in 2008, Bagger Dave's had opened restaurants in 26 locations: 17 in Michigan, and 9 in Indiana. On December 28, 2015, Bagger Dave's announced they would be closing eight underperforming locations. One in Downtown Detroit and seven in Indiana. In 2016, the company was spun off from Diversified Restaurant Holdings, and additional closures in 2017 and 2018 leave the chain with just 10 remaining locations.

On January 26, 2024, the chain announced it would be rebranding the final six locations, four in Michigan, one in Ohio, and one in Ft. Wayne, Indiana.

The Chesterfield, MI location closed on February 16, 2025, leaving the chain with only 5 locations.
