= Bumpy cake =

Chocolate cake with buttercream

Bumpy cake was created by Sanders Confectionery, of Detroit, Michigan, in 1913 and was known as "The Sanders Devil's Food Buttercream Cake" when it was first introduced. It is made of chocolate devil's food cake that is topped with rich buttercream bumps, and then draped in a chocolate ganache.

Sanders Confectionery makes the original trademarked Bumpy Cake, but other companies have attempted to use this trademarked name many times during the cake's 100-year-plus history.

== Preparation ==
In recipes adapted for the home kitchen it can be made by piping the buttercream frosting in thick half-inch diameter strips, about one inch apart. It is placed in the freezer for around two minutes to set the butter cream. The warm fudge frosting is poured over the cake to cover the bumps of buttercream. The frosting sets in the fridge.

The cake is typically baked in an 8-inch-square pan lined with parchment. The first step in preparing the batter is to cream butter, sugar and oil, then eggs and egg whites are added. The dry ingredients—cake flour, cocoa powder, espresso powder, baking powder and salt—are prepared in a separate bowl and are then gradually added to the creamed mixture, alternating with buttermilk.

== See also ==
- List of cakes
