= Cafe D'Mongo's Speakeasy =

Bar in Detroit, Michigan, US

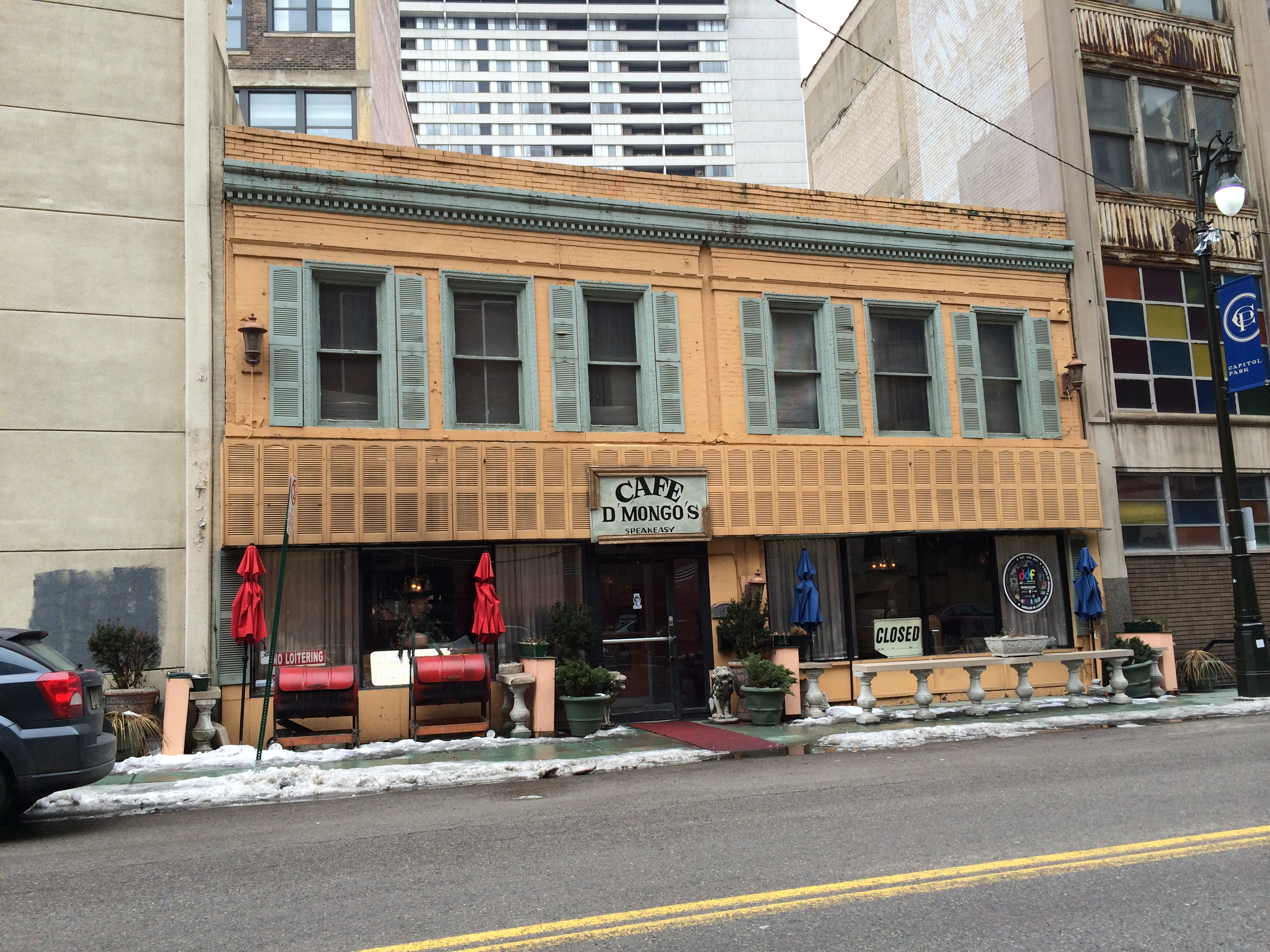
- Interactive map of Cafe D'Mongo's Speakeasy

Restaurant information
- Established: 2007
- Owner: Larry Mongo
- Manager: Christine Passerini
- Location: 1439 Griswold Street, Detroit, Michigan, United States
- Coordinates: 42°20′3.31″N 83°3′0.14″W

Cafe D'Mongo's Speakeasy is a bar located at 1439 Griswold Street in downtown Detroit, Michigan.

== About ==
Founded in 2007, D'Mongo's, the bar was featured on Esquire TV's Best Bars in America in 2014

D'Mongo's was also featured on Bizarre Foods with Andrew Zimmern on the Travel Channel. Also, Detroit-based film production company, Margrave Pictures, filmed Boris the Porkchop Thief inside D'Mongo's.

== See also ==
- Downtown Detroit
- Speakeasy
- The Purple Gang
