= Elwood Bar =

- U.S. National Register of Historic Places
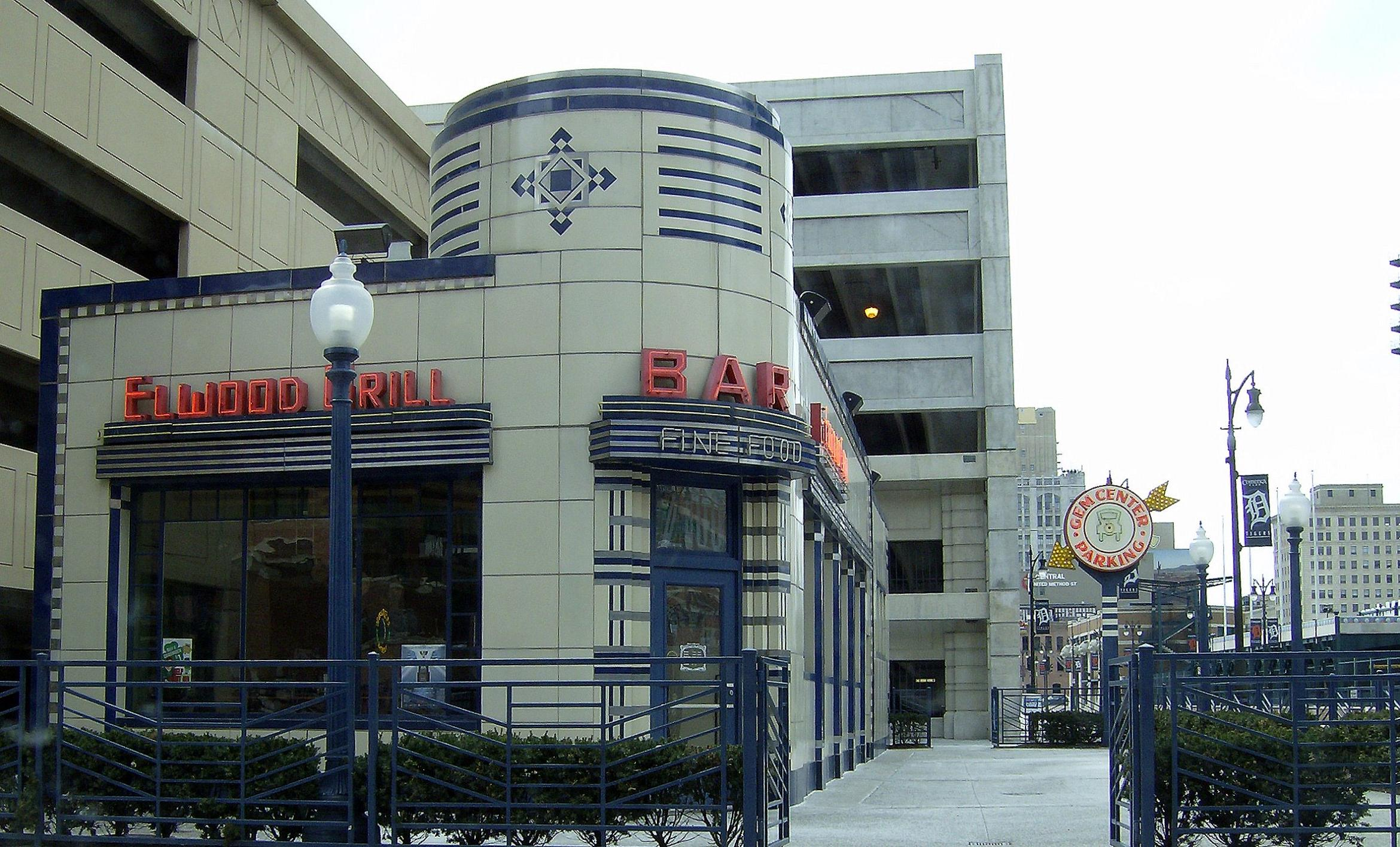
- Map showing the location of the Elwood Bar
- Location: 300 East Adams Street; Detroit, Michigan
- Coordinates: 42°20′18.5″N 83°2′49″W
- Built: 1936
- Architect: Charles Noble
- Architectural style: Art Moderne
- NRHP reference No.: 85001074
- Added to NRHP: May 15, 1985

The Elwood Bar is a Detroit, Michigan tavern built in 1936, and is notable example of Art Moderne architecture. It was originally built at 2100 Woodward Avenue (on the corner of Woodward and Elizabeth), and in 1997 was moved to 300 East Adams Street. The name comes from a combination of the cross streets: (El)izabeth and (Wood)ward. The building was listed on the National Register of Historic Places in 1985.

== Architecture ==
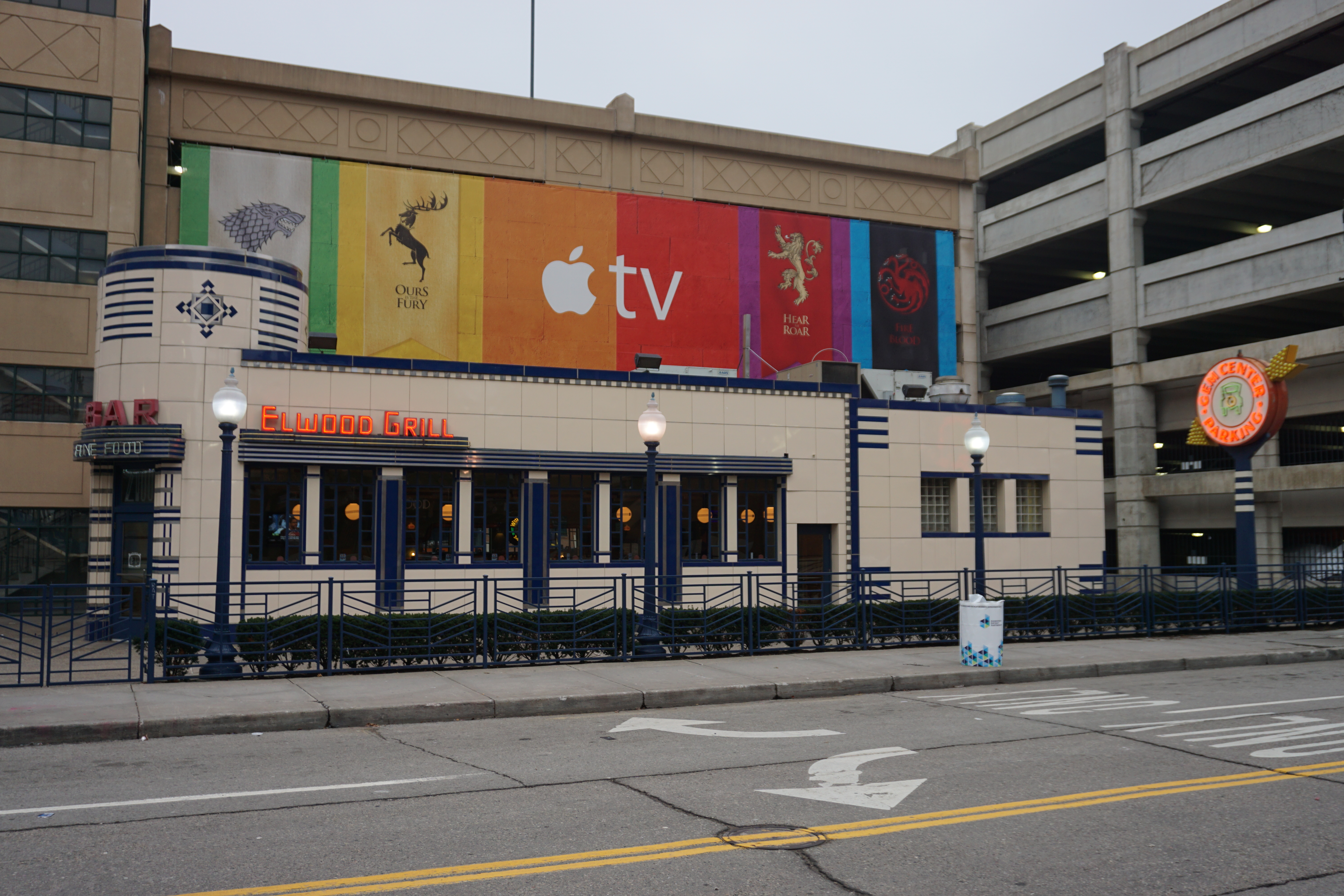
The Elwood Bar in December 2015

The Elwood, designed by Charles Noble, is an excellent Detroit example of Art Moderne Style. Designed for a corner lot, the two facades are covered with cream and blue enameled steel. The building is a single story, measuring 72 feet by 25 feet, but a cylindrical tower extends above the corner entrance to a height of just over 22 feet. The tower is decorated with blue stripes and geometric design. This design, as well as neon signage, extends to the rest of the exterior of the building.

The main entrance is in the corner of the building, below the tower. The enameled panels step back toward the entryway, and form an abstracted surround. The word "Bar" is above the entrance, formed in three dimensional painted sheet metal. One large window is located on the short side of the building, and eleven smaller ones on the long side.

The interior contains a curved, hardwood bar, with red and black panels inset along the bottom. Seating is in a series of red and black vinyl booths. The bathrooms have Skylights and terrazzo floors.

== History ==
The Elwood Bar was constructed as an investment for the John R. Williams Estate. In 1936, the estate hired Charles Noble to design the building; it was likely constructed in late 1936 or early 1937. The bar was purchased by George and Mary Courtesis in 1964. They owned it until the early 1980s, when it was purchased by Chuck Forbes, who owns the building as of 2016. The building was renovated in 1988, and has always served as a bar and grill.

In 1997, construction of Comerica Park (the Detroit Tigers stadium) threatened the Elwood, and the Bar was moved to its present location at 300 East Adams Street (on the corner of Adams and Brush). The building underwent a complete restoration at that time, and is now open as "Elwood Bar and Grill," catering to visitors attending games at the nearby Comerica Park and Ford Field.

In popular culture a photo of the Elwood appears briefly in a 2016 episode of the ABC sitcom Modern Family. In episode 7.17 "Express Yourself" at the 1:20 mark, right after the opening credits, the Elwood can be viewed at its current location.
