= Jet's Pizza =

American pizza franchise restaurant

Jet's America, Inc.

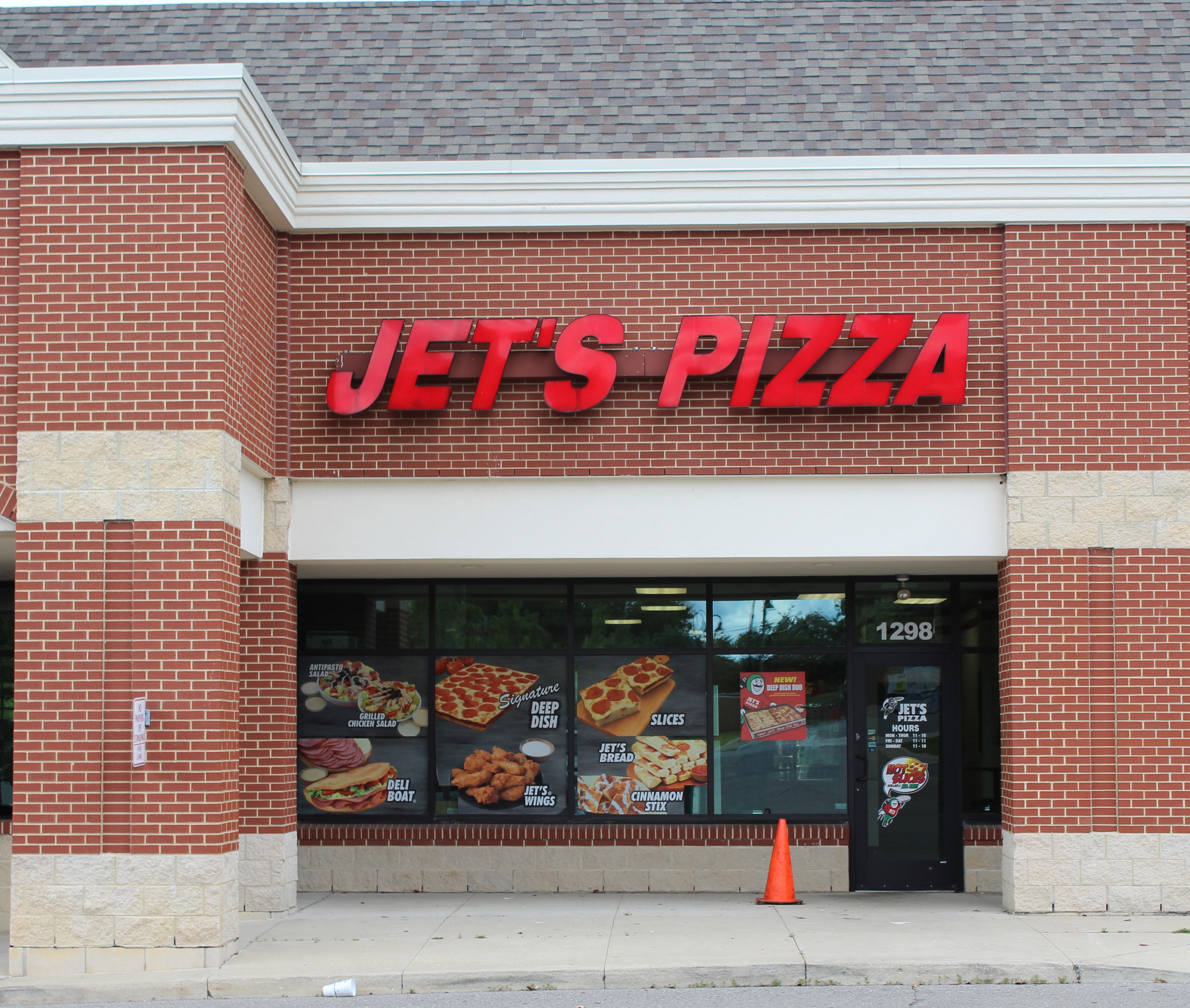
- A Jet's Pizza store in Ypsilanti Township, Michigan
- Trade name: Jet's Pizza
- Formerly: Jetts Party Shoppe & Pizzeria (1978–1985)
- Type: Private
- Industry: Restaurant
- Founded: Sterling Heights, Michigan (1978; 48 years ago)
- Founder: Eugene and John Jetts
- Headquarters: Sterling Heights, Michigan, U.S.
- Number of locations: 425 (2024)
- Area served: United States
- Key people: John Jetts (CEO)
- Products: Pizza; Breadsticks; Salads; Sandwiches; Dessert
- Revenue: US$510 million (2022)
- Number of employees: 16,000 (2023)
- Website: jetspizza.com

Jet's America, Inc., doing business as Jet's Pizza, is an American chain of fast food pizza restaurants. Founded in Sterling Heights, Michigan in 1978, Jet's has more than 400 locations across 25 U.S. states, primarily franchised.

== History ==
The first Jet's Pizza was opened in 1978 by brothers Eugene and John Jetts in Sterling Heights, Michigan. The original location was converted from a vacant party store into a restaurant. The Jetts later opened more locations and formed Jet's America Inc. with their cousins, Jim Galloway, Jr. and Jeff Galloway in 1992.

Jet's is known for its square deep-dish Detroit-style pizza, including an eight-corner pizza which the company has trademarked. When the store first opened, the square pizzas were a novelty in the region. The original recipe came from the Jetts's mother and has not changed since 1978.

The first franchise location was opened in 1990. As of January 2024, Jet's Pizza had 425 franchises in 22 states, with restaurant locations in Arizona, Colorado, Florida, Georgia, Illinois, Indiana, Kentucky, Michigan, Minnesota, Missouri, Montana, Nevada, New York, North Carolina, Ohio, Pennsylvania, South Carolina, Tennessee, Texas, Utah, Virginia, Washington, and Wisconsin.

In 2021, Jet's partnered with restaurant technology firm HungerRush to utilize the firm's OrderAI software. The initial rollout of the system allowed customers to place orders via text message. In August 2022, Jet's completed a successful pilot program of OrderAI Talk. Franchisees that opt to use OrderAI Talk will connect phone-in customers to an artificially intelligent phone bot, instead of a live human. The AI system is designed to learn consumer behavior to improve upselling and targeted marketing.
