= Frankenmuth Brewery =

Brewery and restaurant in Frankenmuth, Michigan

Coordinates: 43.3312°N 83.7379°W

Frankenmuth Brewery is a brewery and restaurant in Frankenmuth, Michigan. It is one of the oldest breweries in Michigan. The business closed in 2003 and reopened in 2009.

Martin Heubisch and Wilhelm Knaust built a brewery in 1862. John G. Geyer bought it in 1874 and renamed it Geyer Bros. Brewing Co. In 1987 it was purchased out of bankruptcy for $365,000 by Ervin Industries and Ferdinand M. Schumacher, who renamed the business Frankenmuth Brewery, Inc. Randall E. Heine bought majority ownership from Ervin Industries in 1990. Heine sold as many as 13,000 barrels of beer in 25 states before an F3 tornado on June 21, 1996, tore through "Little Bavaria", downtown Frankenmuth. The business was closed for seven years in the aftermath, re-opening in June 2003 with a 300-seat, three-level restaurant. There was also a Frankenmuth Brewing Company.

The brewery's products have included Frankenmuth Pilsner, Bock, Dark, Weiss (beer) and Octoberfest.

Anmar and Haithem Sarafa purchased and reopened the Frankenmuth Brewery in July 2009.

== See also ==
- Haithem Sarafa
