= Russ' =

Restaurant chain

Russ' Restaurants
- Company type: Private
- Industry: Restaurants
- Genre: Casual dining
- Founded: 1934; 92 years ago in Holland, Michigan, U.S.
- Founder: J. Russel "Russ" Bouws
- Headquarters: Holland, Michigan
- Number of locations: 12 as of February 2026
- Area served: West Michigan
- Products: American food
- Website: www.russrestaurants.com

Russ' (Russ' Restaurants) is a chain of casual family dining restaurants based in West Michigan. The company is based in Holland, Michigan, and currently has 12 dining locations, including restaurants in Grand Haven, Grand Rapids, Holland, and Muskegon. Their slogan is, "The Home Made Goodness People."

== History ==
=== Early history ===
In 1934, John Riekus Bouws purchased Doc's Barbecue from Carol "Doc" Hansen for $147 (equivalent to $3,538 in 2025), with the intention of having his son Russ Bouws and daughter-in-law Metta run the business. Located on what was then M-21 in Holland, Michigan, Doc's was reopened as Russ's Place. At the time of the restaurant's establishment, Russ was 20 years old, with limited experience preparing and cooking food.

The restaurant sat on a plot owned by John Zoerhof, who leased the land to the Bouws for the price of two meals per day. Metta left the business partnership sometime before 1935. Russ and his wife Julia built a home across the street from the restaurant in 1940, which was still standing as of December 2020.

=== Relocation and expansion ===
Due to a property dispute with Zoerhof, Russ' Place relocated in 1946. The five-seat restaurant building was physically moved across the street from Zoerhof's land by means of a truck.

In 1949, Russ razed the original building and constructed a new restaurant, which reopened as Eastown Russ'. Having anticipated growth, Russ designed the building with the drive-in concept and assembly-line food preparation in mind. He enlarged this location in 1958, and remodeled it again in 1959.

In 1965, the restaurant was remodeled again to increase the indoor seating capacity. The number of parking spaces for tray service was also increased. By this time, Russ and Julia's sons John and Bryan were involved in the business. A second location was opened in Muskegon.

In 1968, Russ franchised his restaurant concept to Howard De Haan, who opened the first Russ's Restaurant locations in Grand Rapids. By 1974, a commissary was added to the fleet. By the 1980s, Russ' Restaurant franchises were operating in Battle Creek, Kalamazoo, Portage, Lansing, and Elmhurst, Illinois.

J. Russel Bouws died in 1992, at which point his surviving family took on ownership of the business.

=== 21st century ===
The chain celebrated its 85th anniversary in 2019. In January 2026, the Grand Haven location received permission from the City Planning Commission to add a drive-thru service window.

== Operations ==
Russ' Restaurants operates a 28,000 square feet (2,600 m^{2}) commissary in Holland, which produces soups, desserts, dressings, and gravies for the chain. Croutons, baked goods, and pigs in a blanket are also prepared onsite. Additionally, the facility serves as a storage and distribution center for bulk food deliveries.

== Community involvement ==
=== Employee scholarships ===
In December 1986, Russ's franchisee Howard De Haan presented Calvin College with a donation of $50,000 (equivalent to $146,858 in 2025) to establish the J. Russel Bouws / Russ' Restaurant Scholarship fund. The scholarship was available to students of the college who were employed at Russ' Restaurants in Kent County during their studies. In January 2011, the estate of Julia Bouws presented a donation of just over $18,000 (equivalent to $25,762 in 2025) to expand the scope of the fund. As of 2026, Calvin students who are employed by Russ' Restaurants in Allegan, Kent, Muskegon, and Ottawa Counties are eligible to apply for the scholarship.

The J. Russel and Julia Bouws Scholarship also offers scholarship opportunities to Russ' Restaurant employees, or the children, grandchildren, or spouses of employees via the Community Foundation of the Holland/Zeeland Area (CFHZ).

=== Emergency relief efforts ===
During a regional snow emergency in January 2026, all 12 Russ' Restaurant locations provided complimentary dine-in breakfast to snow plow drivers, tow truck drivers, and first responders. The free breakfast menu consisted of two eggs, bacon and sausage, toast, and a beverage. The company's practice of providing meals to emergency response personnel during winter storms was first established during a polar vortex event in 2019.
