= Haab's Restaurant =

American restaurant

Coordinates: 42.241°N 83.613°W

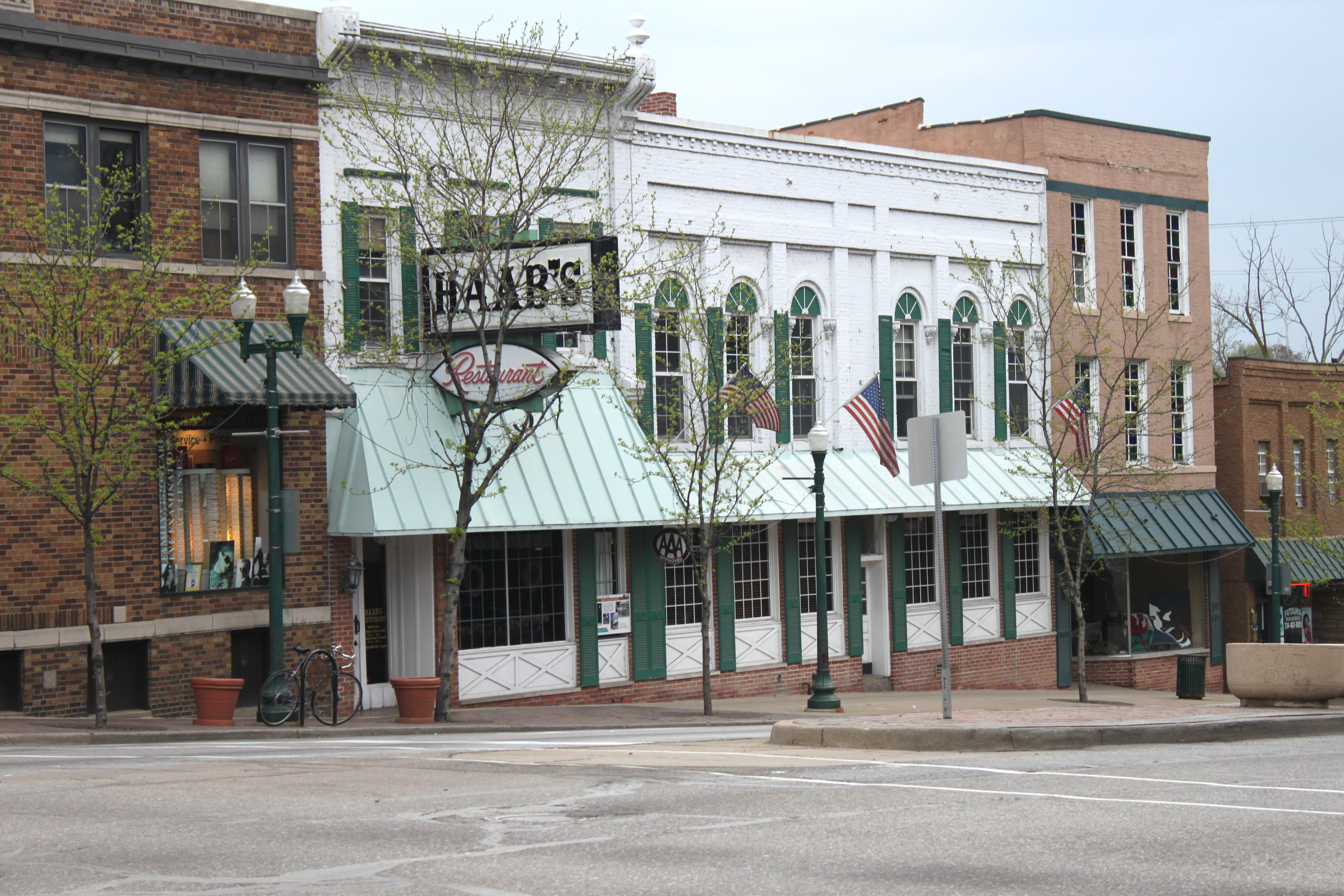
Haab's Restaurant

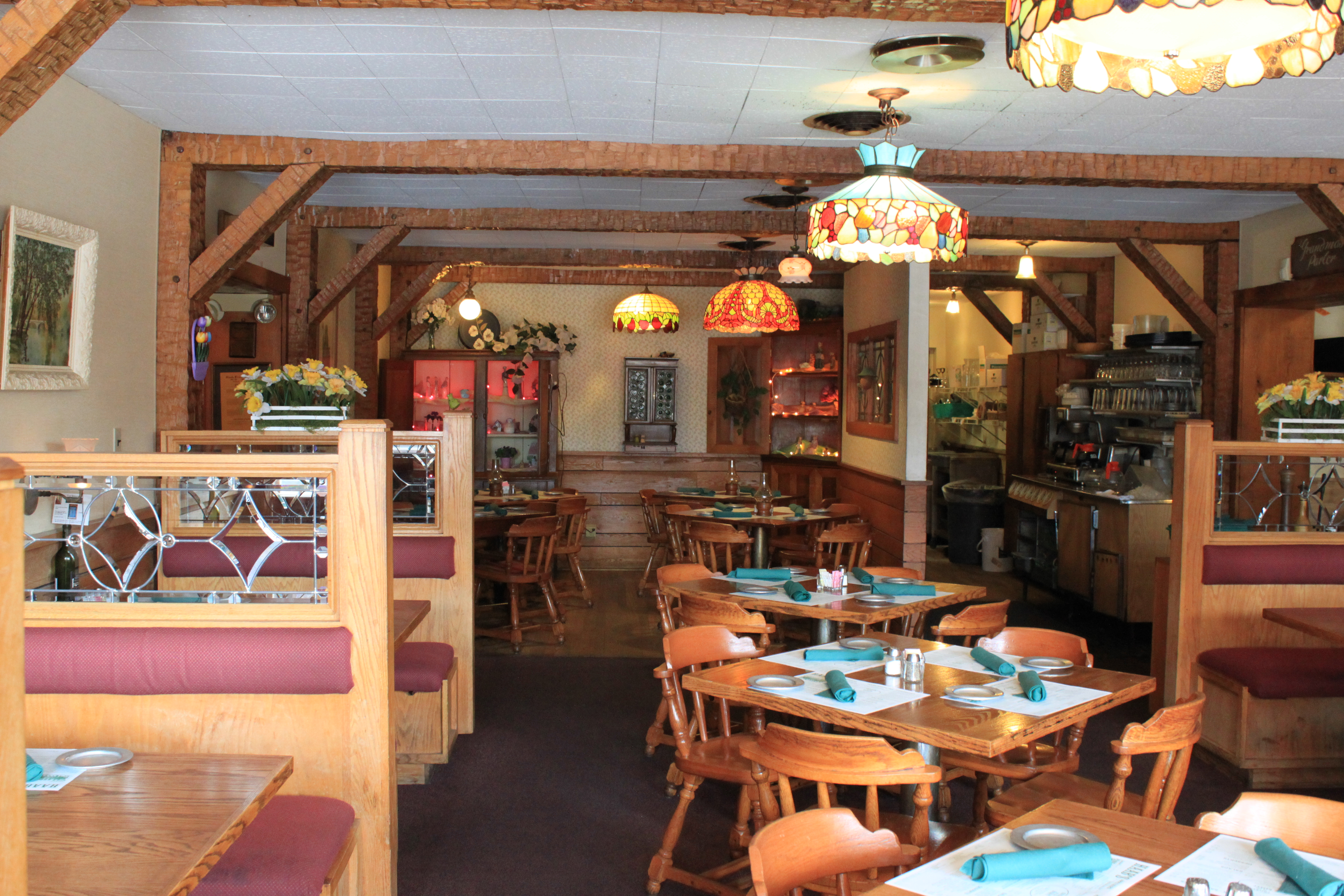
Haab's dining area

Haab's Restaurant was located in downtown Ypsilanti, Michigan, at 18 West Michigan Avenue. The restaurant had a bar area with an 30-foot-long (9.1 m) African mahagony bar and overhead ceiling fans, and two dining rooms. The decor was 19th-century with a pressed tin ceiling and features Tiffany lamps and heirlooms from the Haab family. It had seating for 130. The menu entrées were mainly steaks, chops, fried chicken and seafood, with the London broil being the most popular menu item. The front entrance displayed an article in Monthly Detroit about Detroit area steakhouses in which the author named Haab's as his favorite

== History ==
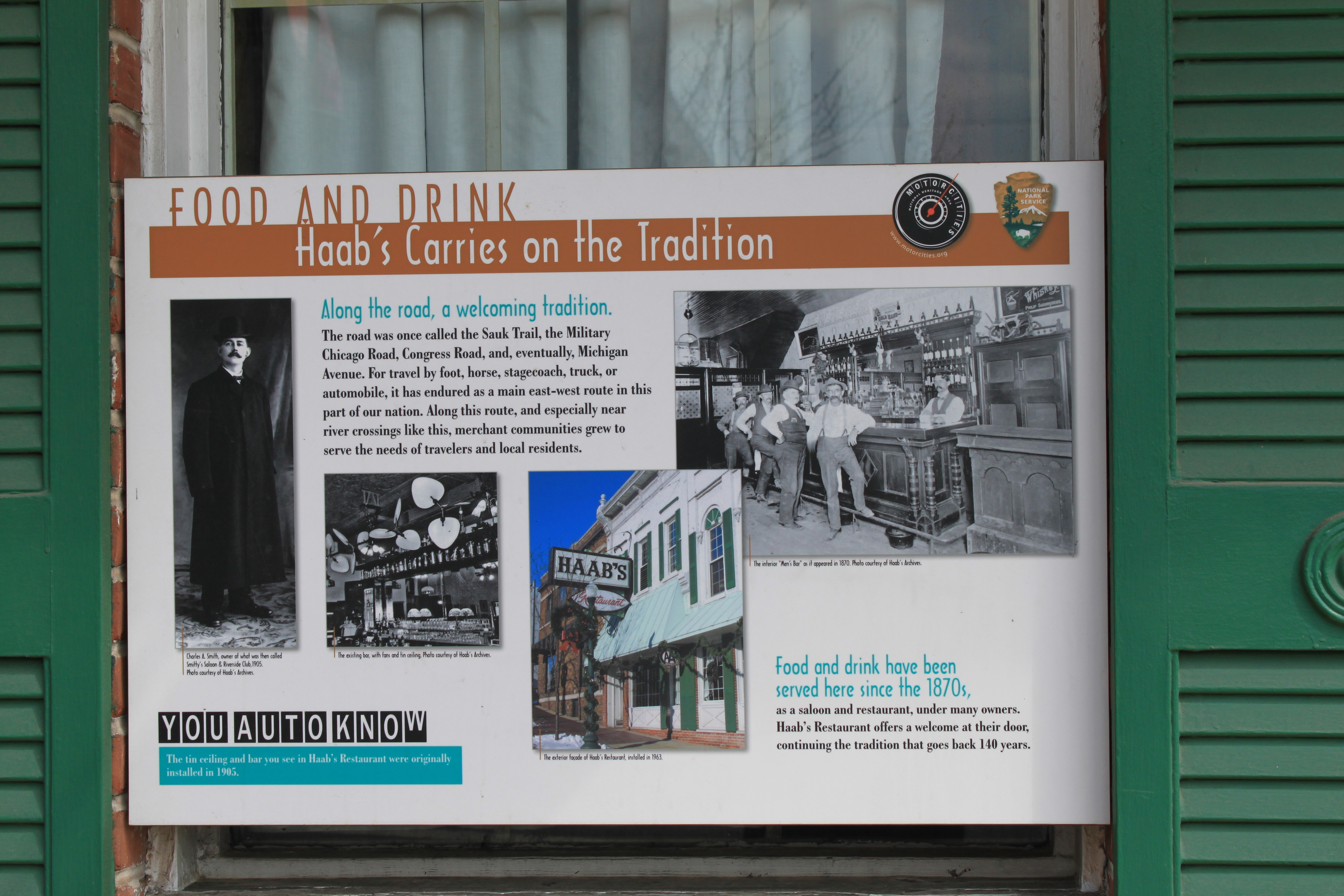
Exterior historical marker

Haab's was opened in 1934 by Otto and Oscar Haab on a site which had been used for a restaurant and bar since the 1870s, on U.S. Highway 12, the main road between Detroit and Chicago. The restaurant was purchased in 1976 by Mike Kabat and Harvey Glaze. Glaze sold his interest in the restaurant in 1991 and it was then owned by Mike Kabat and his son David. Until 2011, on the third Monday in October, Haab's celebrated the anniversary of the opening of the restaurant by featuring three items from the 1934 menu, which were still served, at their 1934 prices such as chicken in a basket (50 cents), spaghetti (40 cents) and a barbecue sandwich (20 cents). The "chicken in a basket" menu item was formerly licensed from the now defunct Chicken in the Rough franchise. In January 2014, Haab's announced that the anniversary celebration would resume with a new format: a 34% discount off regular checks.

On July 14, 2013, Haab's was named the winner of the "June Road Trip" contest on the QVC program In the Kitchen with David. The restaurant was subsequently visited by the show's host David Venable and producer Mary DeAngeli. On July 28, it was announced that the show would do a remote broadcast from Ypsilanti on August 25.

On March 3, 2022, Haab's officially closed down.
