= Happy's Pizza =

American chain restaurant

Happy's Pizza Holdings, LLC.

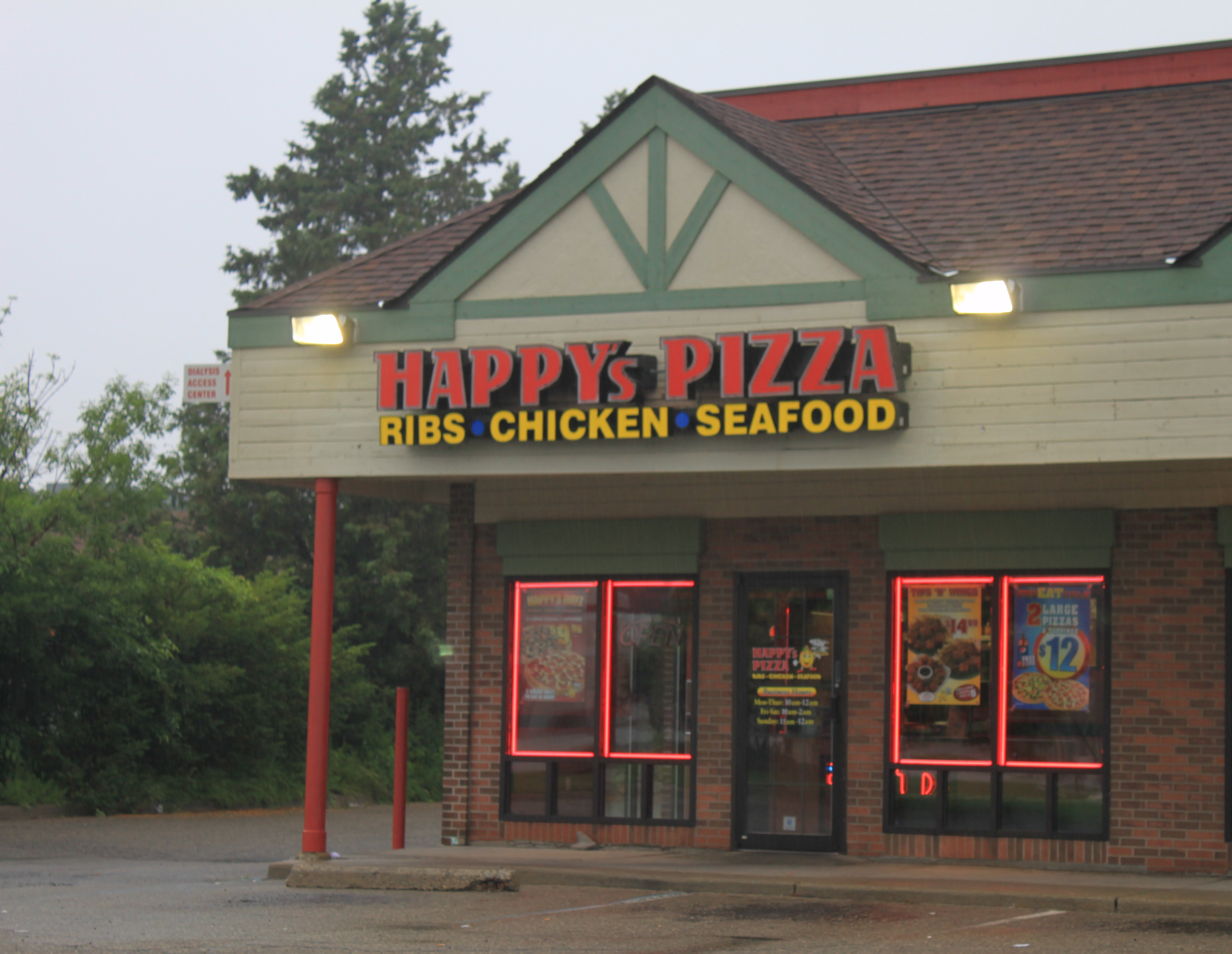
- A Happy's Pizza in Ypsilanti Township, Michigan.
- Company type: Private
- Industry: Restaurant
- Founded: Detroit, Michigan (1994; 32 years ago)
- Founder: Happy Asker
- Headquarters: Farmington Hills, Michigan, U.S.
- Number of locations: 65+
- Key people: Maher Bashi, COO
- Products: Pizza; Seafood; Ribs; Chicken; Sandwiches; Salads; Desserts
- Website: happyspizza.com

Happy's Pizza is an American regional chain of restaurants, serving pizza, ribs, chicken, seafood, sandwiches, pasta and salad.

== History ==
The first Happy's Pizza restaurant was opened by Happy Asker in 1994 on the east side of Detroit. From 2006 to early 2008, the chain doubled in size and reached 27 locations.

Now the chain has more than 65 locations in Michigan, Nevada, California and Ohio. The pizzerias are known for their granite counter tops, Venetian plaster on their walls and the neon signs in and outside of the building.

== Service of otherwise unserved areas ==
The company makes a point of opening stores and offering delivery services in areas where other pizza places will not. Happy's Pizza started with one restaurant in Detroit, and grew to a large pizza restaurant chain.

== Fraud convictions ==
In 2010, federal agents raided the company's headquarters. On July 16, 2013, Happy Asker and five other shareholders were indicted on counts of fraud and tax evasion. The Office of the United States Attorney for the Eastern District of Michigan alleged Asker and the others came up with a scheme to under-report taxable income and payroll taxes from $2.1 million in wages from more than 50 Happy's Pizza locations in Michigan, Ohio, Indiana and elsewhere. They were charged with conspiracy to defraud the U.S. government, filing false income tax returns, and corrupt endeavor to obstruct IRS laws. The defendants charged with conspiracy faced up to five years in prison and a $25,000 fine. Those charged with filing false tax returns and obstruction faced up to three years in prison and a $250,000 fine on each count. In July 2015, Asker was found guilty on all charges and was sentenced to over four years in prison and ordered to pay $2.5 million in restitution. The other four pleaded guilty. Maher Bashi, the pizza chain's chief operating officer, was sentenced to two years in prison and ordered to pay $620,297. Two franchisees were given prison sentences, while a third received three years probation.

== See also ==
- List of pizza chains of the United States'
- List of pizza franchises
