= CapVest Limited =

European investment firm

- Company type: Limited
- Industry: private equity
- Founded: 1999; 27 years ago
- Founders: Séamus Fitzpatrick; Randl Shure
- Headquarters: 100 Pall Mall, London SW1Y5NQ
- Products: Management buyouts Leveraged finance Venture capital Growth capital
- Website: capvest.co

Capvest Limited is a European investment firm headquartered in London, United Kingdom, and is a mid-market private equity firm specialising in sectors which are characterised by non-discretionary demand.

Its investments include STADA, FoodVest, Mater, Punch Taverns, RenoNorden, Scandi Standard, Scandza, United Coffee, Vaasan & Vaasan,Young's Bluecrest, and Novus Foods.

== History ==
In 1999, CapVest Associates LLP was founded in London, United Kingdom.

In May 2021 the firm sold Valeo Foods to Bain Capital for an estimated £1.5 billion.

in April 2022, CapVest acquired the Michigan-based snacks and treats producer, Second Nature Brands.
