= Hungry Howie's Pizza =

American pizza chain

Hungry Howie’s Pizza & Subs, Inc.

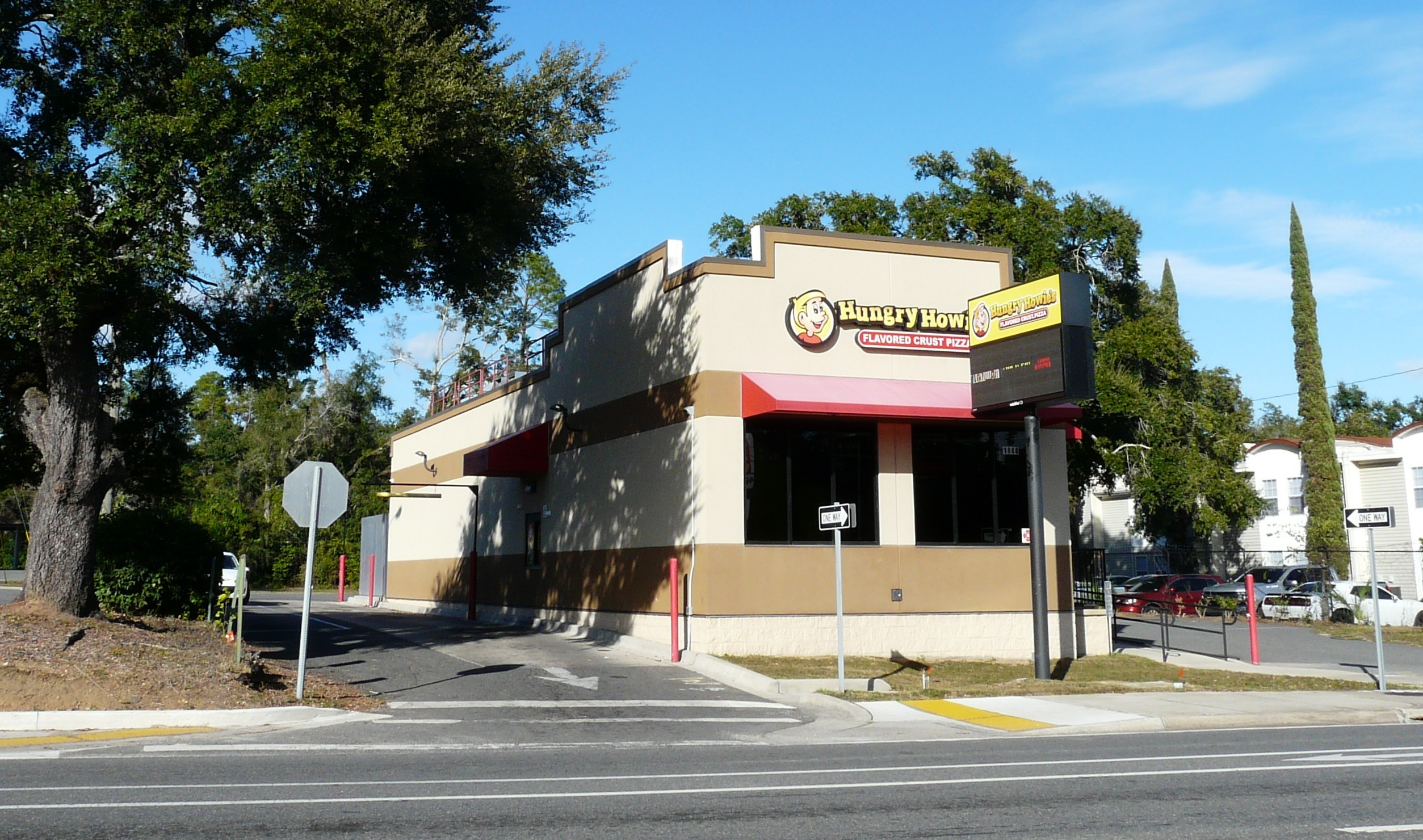
- Hungry Howie's Pizza in Tallahassee, Florida
- Trade name: Hungry Howie's Pizza
- Type: Private
- Industry: Restaurant
- Founded: 1973; 53 years ago in Taylor, Michigan
- Founder: James Hearn
- Headquarters: Madison Heights, Michigan
- Key people: James R. Hearn (founder) Steven E. Jackson (CEO)
- Products: Pizza
- Revenue: $280.0 million (2009)
- Website: www.hungryhowies.com

Hungry Howie's Pizza & Subs, Inc., also known as Hungry Howie's Pizza, is a franchise and the 11th largest pizza chain in the United States, with nearly 500 locations. Hungry Howie's products include pizza, calzone-style subs, chicken wings and tenders, bread, salads, cookies, and brookies. Its headquarters are located in Madison Heights, Michigan in Metro Detroit.

== History ==
James Hearn opened the first Hungry Howie's on Telegraph Road in Taylor, Michigan in 1973. At the time, Steve Jackson delivered pizzas for Hearn. Howie's soon became a popular hangout for students at nearby Taylor Junior High and Taylor Center High Schools. Hearn and Jackson partnered and, in 1982, made the decision to franchise their operation. The first Hungry Howie's franchise was awarded in 1983.

Within the first three years, the company franchised 65 locations. By 1990, the number had grown to 160. In 2005, the company opened its 500th store. There are currently over 550 Hungry Howie's franchises located in 18 states.

Hungry Howie’s offers traditional and specialty pizza varieties. In 2025, the franchise added Detroit-style pizza to its menu to reflect evolving customer tastes and regional trends.

== Flavored crust ==
Hungry Howie's promotes itself as "Home of the Flavored Crust Pizza". The concept of flavored crust was brought to the attention of Hearn and Jackson by a franchisee who put sesame seeds and butter on their crusts. Hungry Howie's began an evaluation process and started testing flavored crusts in a few stores, rolling out eight flavors in 1985.

The current flavored crust options are butter, butter cheese, asiago cheese, ranch, cajun, sesame, garlic herb, and Italian herb which replaced onion crust in 2023. Multiple crust flavors may be combined.

== Love, Hope & Pizza ==
Since 2009, Hungry Howie's has been dedicated to spreading awareness and raising funds for the National Breast Cancer Foundation (NBCF) through its Love, Hope & Pizza campaign. During October, the brand turns its pizza boxes pink and, for every pizza sold, makes a donation to the NBCF. As of September 2020, Hungry Howie's has donated over $3 million to the foundation.

Between September 28 and October 29, 2020, Hungry Howie's pledged to make a donation for every pizza sold in a pink pizza box to the NBCF's COVID-19 relief fund. The company included the option for customers to donate to the fund when ordering online for the rest of 2020.

== See also ==
- List of pizza chains of the United States
