= YaYa's Flame Broiled Chicken =

Fast food restaurant

- Trade name: YaYa's Flame Broiled Chicken
- Industry: Restaurant
- Genre: Fast food
- Founded: Florida (1985)
- Founder: Constantine "Gus" Chinonis; John Chinonis
- Headquarters: Flint, Michigan
- Area served: Michigan; Florida
- Products: Chicken
- Website: www.yayas.com

YaYa's Flame Broiled Chicken (also known by the stylistic variant YAYA's Flame Broiled Chicken) is an American fast food restaurant chain based in Flint, Michigan. Its specialty is flame-broiled chicken. It was started in 1985 by brothers Constantine "Gus" and John Chinonis in Florida. Stores later opened in Georgia, Michigan, Ohio, and Minnesota. Its current locations are in Florida and Michigan, with the greatest concentration in the Genesee County area.
