= Riverside Inn (Leland, Michigan) =

- U.S. National Register of Historic Places
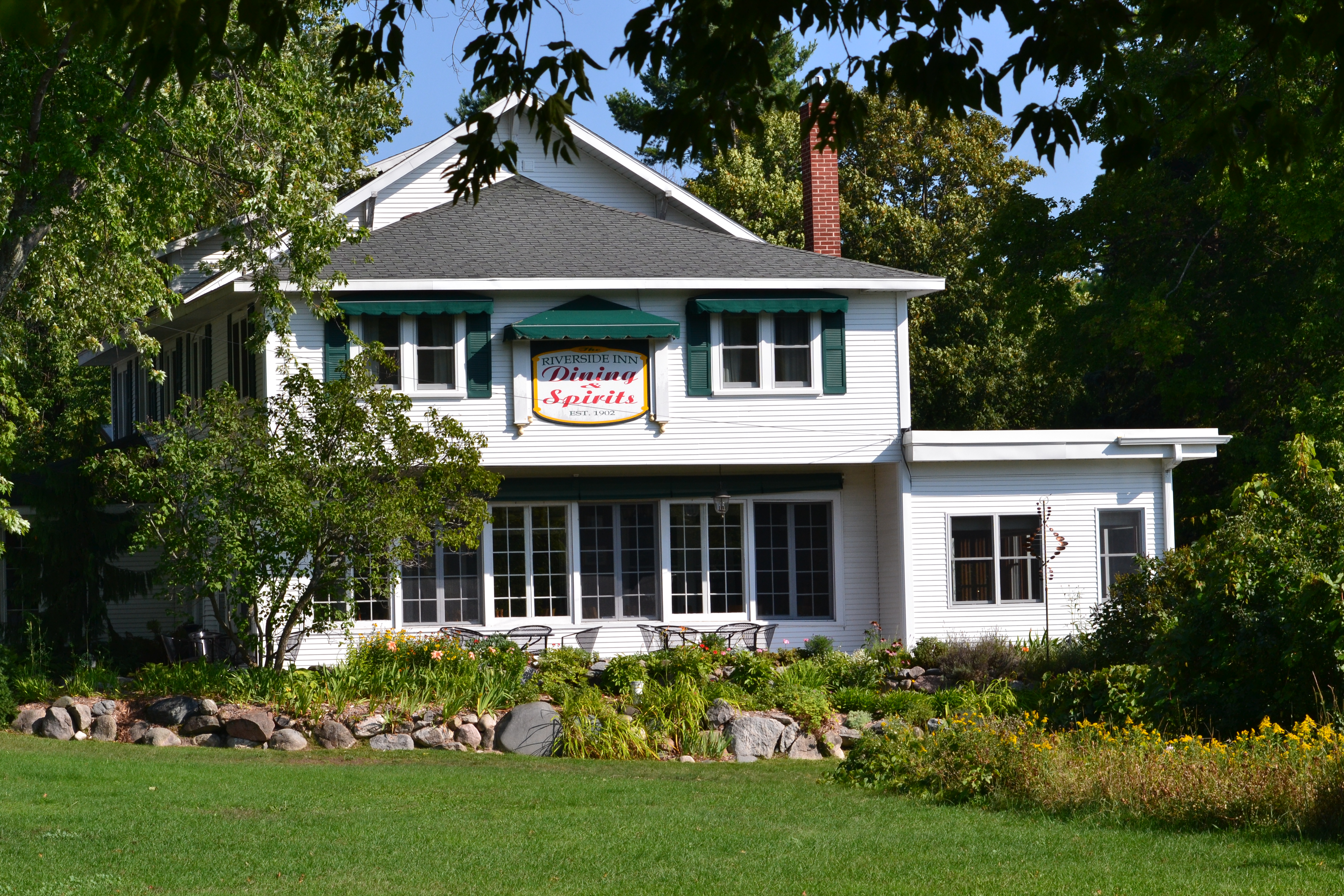

- Location within Michigan Location within the United States
- Interactive map
- Location: 302 E. River St., Leland, Michigan
- Coordinates: 45.0222°N 85.7580°W
- Area: less than one acre
- Built: 1925
- Architectural style: Bungalow/craftsman
- NRHP reference No.: 03000386
- Added to NRHP: May 8, 2003

The Riverside Inn is a restaurant and hotel located at 302 East River Street in Leland, Michigan. It was listed on the National Register of Historic Places in 2003.

== History ==
At the turn of the century, the tourist population around Leland was steadily growing. In 1902, seeing a demand for lodging, Jacob Schwarz constructed an inn near this location. Schwarz constructed other buildings in the area, including, in 1912, a bathhouse that he soon converted into a dance hall. Schwarz ran the Riverside Inn until his death in 1917. His wife followed in 1918, and ownership of the inn passed to the couple's daughters, Blanche and Anna. They ran the inn until 1924, when it was destroyed by fire.

Rather than construct a new building, they modified the 1912 dance hall that Jacob Schwarz had constructed previously. The building was moved to face the river, an upper story was added, and the interior was reworked to make a new inn. Blanche and Anna ran the inn until 1957.

The Riverside Inn is still in business, under owners Barb and Kate Vilter.

== Description ==
The Riverside Inn is a two-story Bungalow/craftsman-style structure, with a restaurant and bar on the first floor and guest rooms upstairs.
