= Ram's Horn (restaurant) =

Restaurant chain in Michigan, United States

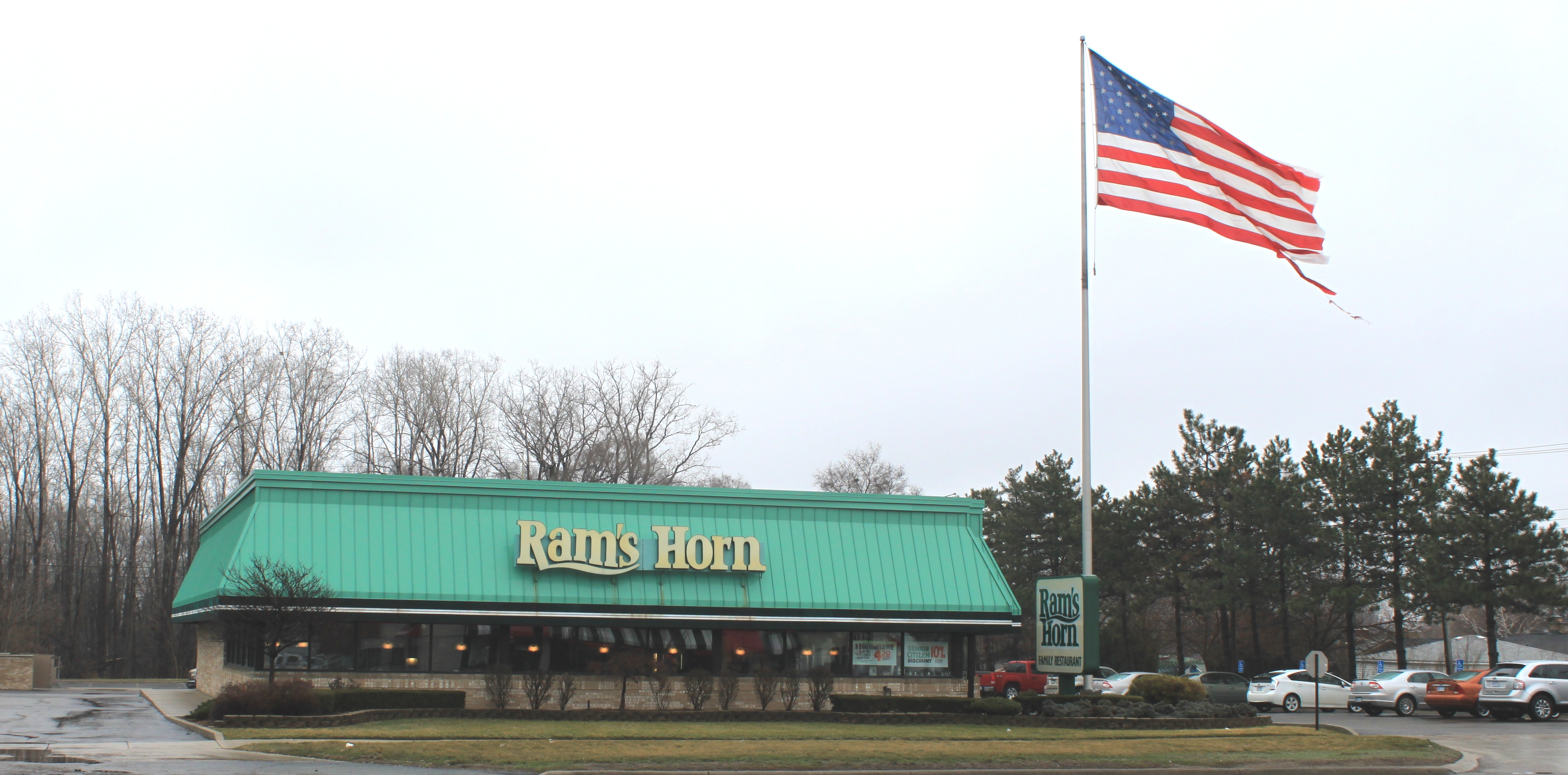
Ram's Horn restaurant in Westland, Michigan

Ram's Horn is a family restaurant restaurant chain in the Detroit, Michigan metropolitan area. It was founded by three brothers, Gus, Gene, and Steve Kasapis, with the first location opening in 1967. There are now 12 locations in Metro Detroit. Most stores are independently owned. In 2013, a location in Livonia, Michigan burned down.
