= Sanders Confectionery =

American confectionary company

Sanders Chocolates is an American brand of chocolates that was founded by Fred Sanders on June 17, 1875. According to company history, by the mid-20th century, the company operated 57 retail stores in the Great Lakes region, featuring counter service offering candy, fudge toppings, baked goods, light lunches and an assortment of desserts. Sanders is known for its bumpy cake and hot fudge cream puffs.

== History ==
The company was founded by the German-born Frederick Sanders Schmidt on June 17, 1875, when he opened a candy store on Woodward Avenue at Gratiot in downtown Detroit. Schmidt, who went by his middle name, chose Sanders as the name of his company. The first shop was opened in Chicago but relocated to Detroit after it was destroyed in the Great Chicago Fire of 1871. Ice cream was soon added to the menu, followed by baked goods and sweet cream sodas. The "Pavilion of Sweets", the company's most well-known confectionery shop, opened at the corner of Michigan and Woodward avenues in 1891, featuring a red and white awning and a tower featuring a cupola reminiscent of Moorish architecture. The store later moved to the site of a former Hudson's, also on Woodward, and named the "Palace of Sweets".

Although Sanders is not the only man claimed to have invented the ice cream float, a popular story claims that when he found that his cream had gone sour, he substituted ice cream for it in a cream soda. The company's hot fudge, based on a family recipe, became one of its most famous products. It is also known for its bumpy cake, named for the thick ridges of ganache-covered buttercream on top. As the company grew, it quickly became the dominant candy company in Detroit. It came to operate a chain of stand-alone neighborhood candy stores, some featuring counters that also served light lunches and soda fountain drinks.

The company produced their candy and other products at a factory in Highland Park, Michigan from 1941 to 1994, which employed 300 at its peak. Originally, the factory sourced fresh milk for their confectionery treats from the adjacent "Cow Palace", until prevented by a change in city ordinances. In 1994, the company was forced to sell the factory because the ceilings provided insufficient clearance for newer equipment. The former factory succumbed to fire in 2012.

By 1962 when the founder's great-grandson John Sanders took over operations, the company made more than $20 million a year in sales. At that time, the company had 111 stores and was sold in malls and grocery stores nation-wide.

Many artifacts from Sanders' history are exhibited at the Detroit Historical Museum.

== Innovations ==
Sanders was one of the first businesses in Detroit to be open on Sunday. Although profitable, Fred Sanders eventually bowed to pressure and closed on Sundays. The Detroit Historical Society recognizes Sanders for innovations including:

- operating the first carry-out service
- moving from high counters to what became more common lower table-height seating
- using dry ice to keep ice cream cold

Sanders was among the first in Detroit to operate equipment run by electric motors, at the time a new technology prone to frequent breakdowns. Henry Ford, then a young mechanic who worked at Edison Illuminating Company, was often hired to repair the motors.

== Bankruptcy and subsequent acquisitions ==
During the 1970s and 1980s the company struggled financially as it faced increased competition. Eventually, it was forced to close its flagship downtown store. In 1979, Stephen A. Horn took over operations as only the second president outside of the Sanders family.

The company was in danger of running out of money due to a protracted recession in Detroit and Michigan, coupled with increased costs for sugar and chocolate. In 1981, the company filed for Chapter 11 bankruptcy in order to protect it from legal action from its over 700 creditors who were owed $4 million in unsecured debt. At that time, the company employed 1200 people at its 50 retail outlets and factory. On May 4, 1988, the Sixth Circuit Court of Appeals approved a plan offered by Sanders' employees' union, United Distributive Workers Council 30, for the purchase of the company's assets by Country Home Bakery.

In 2002 Morley Candy Makers, another Michigan-based confectioner, purchased the Sanders name and original recipes, adding to its own product line. Country Home Bakery, which no longer included Sanders, was purchased in 2004 by J&J Snack Foods.

In 2018, Sanders became a division of Kar's Nuts when it acquired Morley and Sanders. In 2021, Kar's and Sanders were united under the corporate name Second Nature Brands, acquired in 2022 by UK-based private equity company CapVest Limited.

== Legacy ==
By 2014, the number of Sanders shops in metro Detroit had been reduced to nine; however, two additional retail outlets operated on Mackinac Island, Michigan. By 2016, the company had become a growing national presence as a popular dessert and candy brand.

In 2020 the COVID-19 pandemic in the United States forced the company to close all but three of its few remaining retail locations in metro Detroit. After rethinking its business model and noting strong local and nationwide demand for its products online, the company announced that it was accelerating the development of a new retail strategy, including introduction of home delivery services.
