= Ciao Bella Gelato Company =

American frozen dessert company

Ciao Bella Gelato
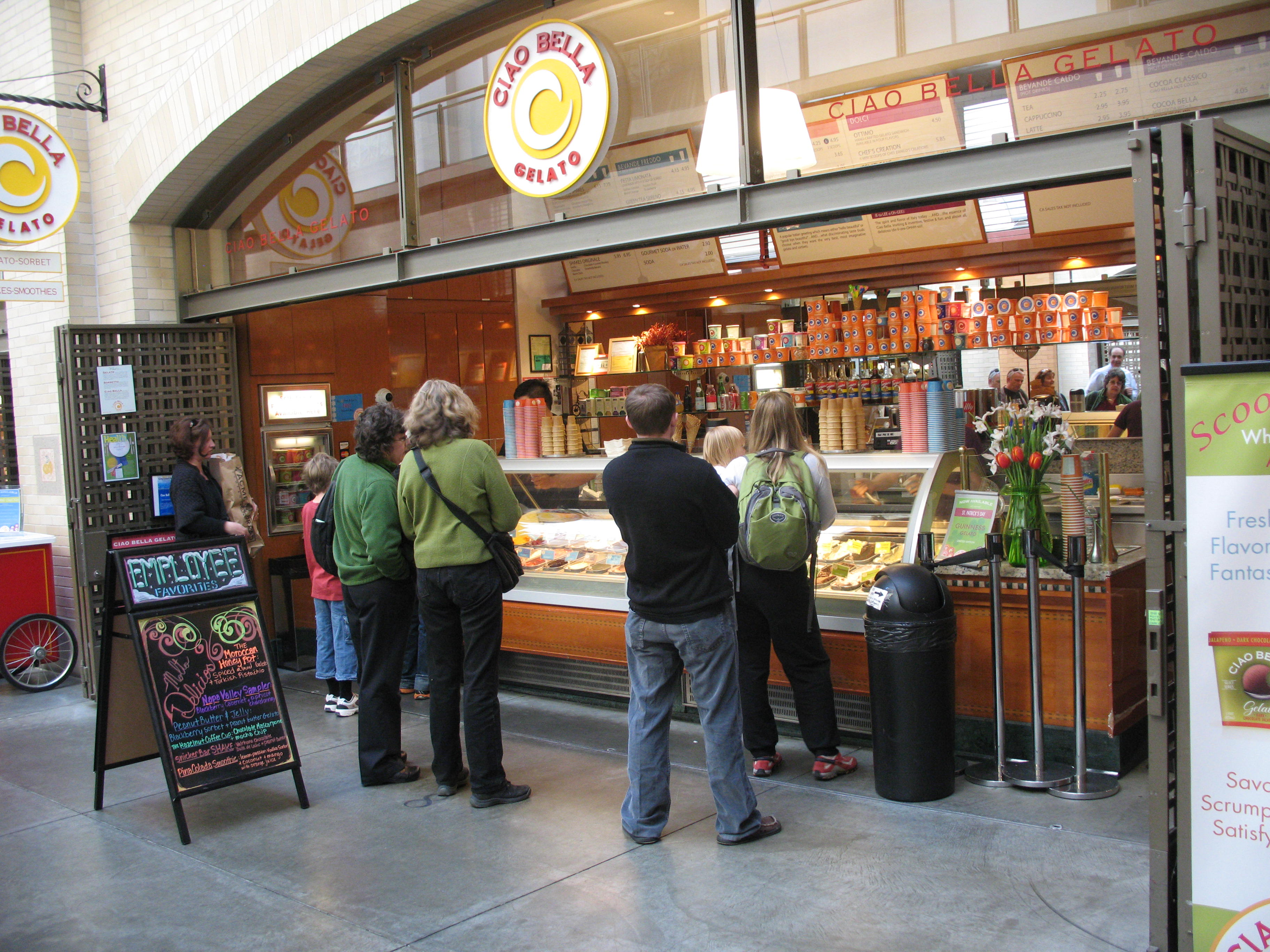
- Type: Private
- Industry: Foods & Beverages
- Founded: 1983
- Headquarters: Marietta, Georgia, United States
- Key people: Carlos Canals (CEO)
- Products: Premium gelato Premium sorbet

Ciao Bella Gelato Company is a frozen dessert company specializing in gelatos and sorbets. Also known as "Ciao Bella", the company began in 1983 in a kitchen in New York City's Little Italy. Traditional recipes from Turin were used. Ciao Bella was formerly owned by Charlie Apt and F.W. Pearce. In 2018, the company was acquired by Atlanta-based High Road Craft Ice Cream, a premium ice cream company.

== History ==
Ciao Bella began as an idea in the summer of 1983 when cousins Jon F. Snyder and Laura Grady were on a summer holiday in Italy. They were both fascinated with the uniqueness of Italian ice creams, having grown up working in their grandparents' Carvel ice cream store in Peekskill, NY. At the age of 19, Snyder, became obsessed with the idea of bringing a version of gelato to New York City. In May 1984, Snyder eventually quit school, raised $25,000 from family and friends and, with Grady and her sister Christine's help, opened a small shop at 451 Broome Street in the SoHo area of Manhattan. Their focus was on building a wholesale business as they canvassed NY restaurants with samples, trying to build a sustainable year-round enterprise. In five years, they built a substantial clientele of chefs which included Charlie Palmer of the River Café, the 21 Club, the Russian Tea Room, Balducci's, and dozens of other eclectic NY eateries. Having grown the business to a sustainable level, Snyder felt it was time to move on and advertised to sell the company in the NY Times in 1989. Believing it to be a brilliant idea to buy it, Frederick William ("F.W.") Pearce borrowed $90,000 from his mother, which was enough to buy the store, a batch freezer, a pickup truck, and the recipes for 60 flavors. In the beginning, everything from mixing flavors to delivering the product, was done by Pearce and a few part-time employees. By 1993, he managed to bring sales up to $1 million. In the same year, he was introduced to a banker, Charlie Apt, who was the partner he was looking for to expand to a larger market. Due to Apt's salesmanship, which included cold calling countless restaurants and adding colors and logos to the then-white pints, product sales doubled to $2 million within another year. In 2001, after years out of the ice cream business, Snyder opened 'il laboratorio del gelato' on NYC's Lower East Side, rededicated to servicing NYC restaurants.

By 2005, Ciao Bella was a $10 million company of 75 employees. That year, they added five stores, including one in Berkeley, to three existing ones in New York and San Francisco.

In 2008, Ciao Bella received a cash infusion of $10–20 million from Encore Consumer Capital and Sherbrooke Capital Management, allowing Sherbrooke to own half of the company.

In 2010, Ciao Bella increased production capacity by moving gelato production to Eugene, Oregon. In 2013, it celebrated 30 years with a free gelato party in New York. Ciao Bella Gelato currently produces in Ludington, Michigan, focused on grocery store sizing and flavors in a 16oz pint.

== Awards and achievements ==
Ciao Bella has won multiple awards, many from the National Association for the Specialty Food Trade (NASFT). Zagat has also named Ciao Bella as the "Best Ice Cream in New York" in 2002.
