= Kar's Nuts =

American snack food manufacturer

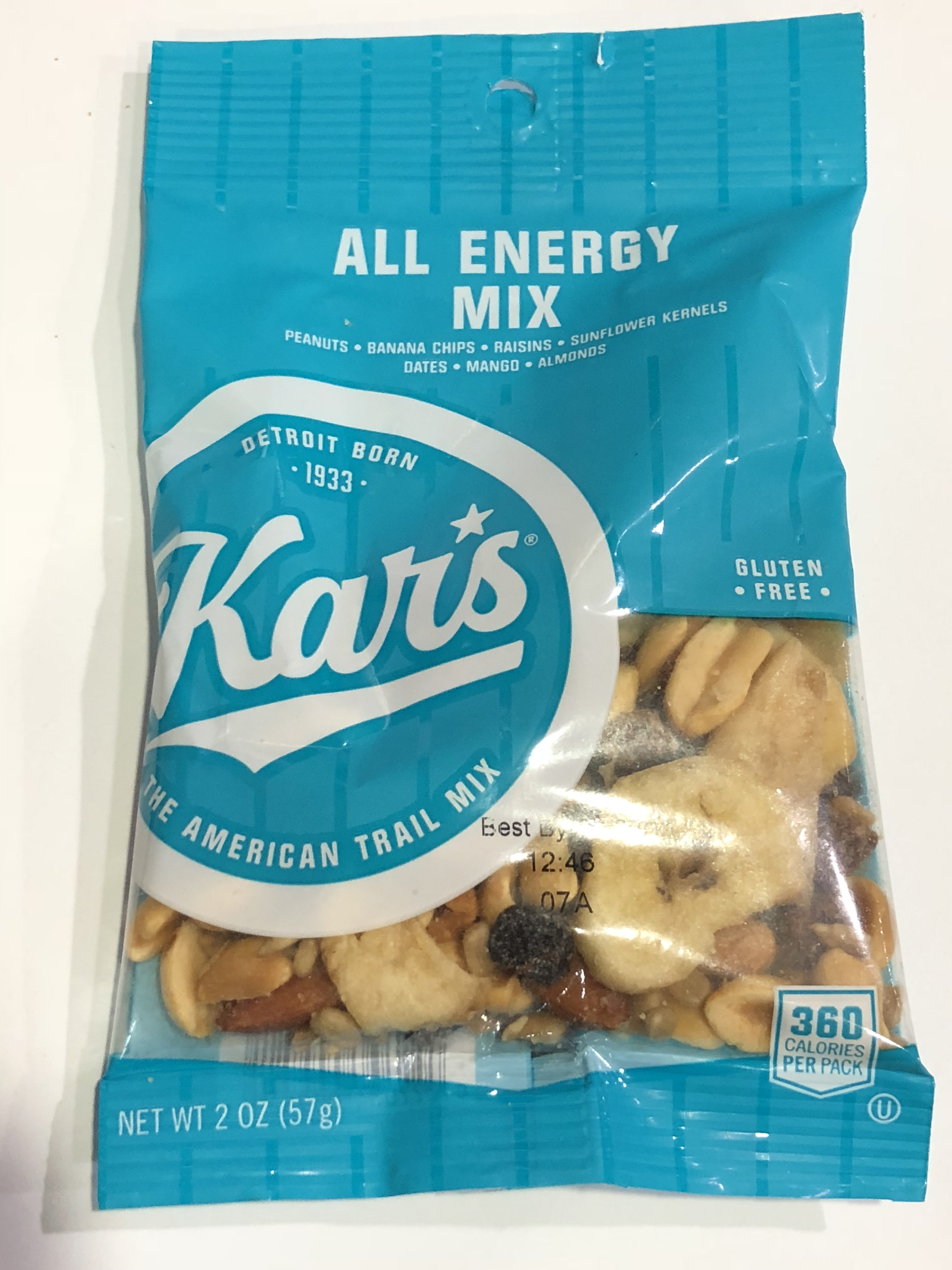
A bag of Kar's All Energy Trail Mix

Kar's Nuts is an American brand of nut and snack items that is headquartered in Madison Heights, Michigan. Kar's Nuts, originally located in Detroit, was incorporated in 1939 from a business that had been distributing nut and snack items throughout Michigan since 1933. After World War II, the company moved to Ferndale, Michigan and soon began distributing their products nationwide. In 2004, the company moved to Madison Heights. Sales are estimated between $100 and $250 million. Kar's business is divided into four market segments that include route sales and delivery to retail outlets in Michigan, Indiana and Ohio, vending machine products, specialty markets and Club Store segment. Kar's products are packaged in single serve, family and super sizes depending on the market segment.

Kar's Nuts and its sister brands Second Nature Snacks and Sanders Chocolates were gathered under the corporate name Second Nature Brands in 2021, after previously having been under the Kar's Nuts banner.

In April 2022, Second Nature Brands were acquired by the UK-based private equity company, CapVest Limited.
