= List of Canadian pizza chains =

This is a list of notable Canadian pizza chains. This list is limited to pizza chain restaurants that are based in or originated in Canada.

== Canadian pizza chains ==
- 241 Pizza - franchise chain headquartered in Scarborough, Toronto
- Boston Pizza - Canadian-based chain that owns and franchises locations in Canada, the United States and Mexico
- City Pizza - Canadian-based chain founded in Cambridge in 2001 that owns and franchises locations in Ontario with 27 locations
- East Side Mario's - Canadian-based chain that owns and franchises locations in Canada
- Freshslice Pizza – Canadian pizza chain and franchise
- Gabriel Pizza – Canadian pizza restaurant franchise
- Greco Pizza Restaurant – Atlantic Canadian pizza chain
- King of Donair – Canadian restaurant chain
- Mikes – Canadian pasta & pizza restaurant chain
- Mother's Pizza – Multinational restaurant chain
- Panago – Canadian pizza chain
- Pizza 73 – Canadian pizza restaurant chain, a subsidiary of Pizza Pizza
- Pizza Delight – Canadian pizza restaurant chain
- Pizza Nova – Canadian pizza restaurant chain
- Pizza Pizza – Canadian pizza restaurant chain
- Pizza Salvatore – Canadian pizza restaurant chain
- Pizzaiolo – American-style pizza chain in Canada
- Pizzaville – Canadian pizza restaurant chain with franchises in Southern Ontario, known for "It was a rainy day in Pizzaville..." radio ads in the 1990s that implied confusion in their phone number being "seven free sex, free sex, free sex"
- Topper's Pizza – Canadian pizzeria chain
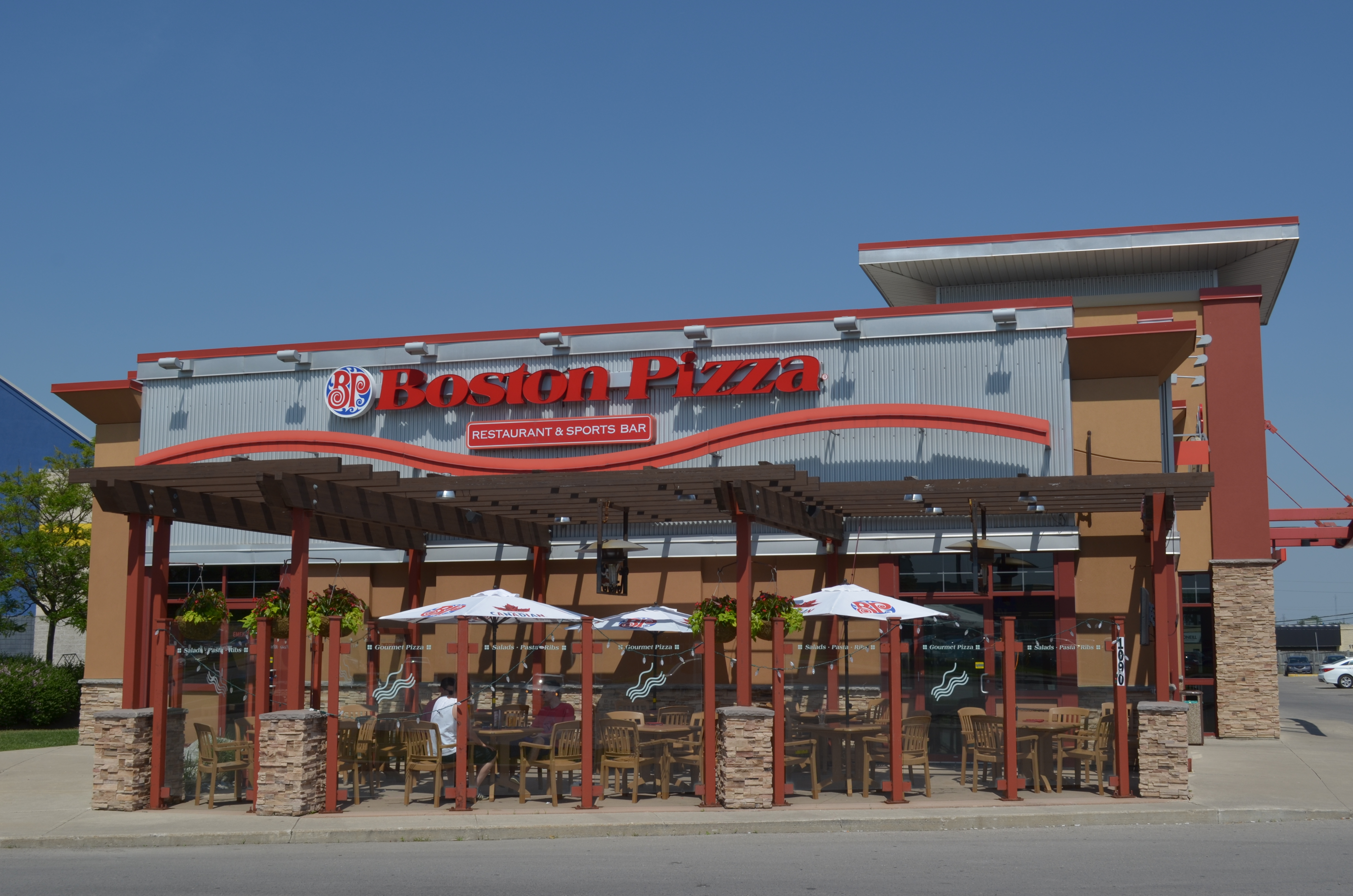
A Boston Pizza location in London, Ontario

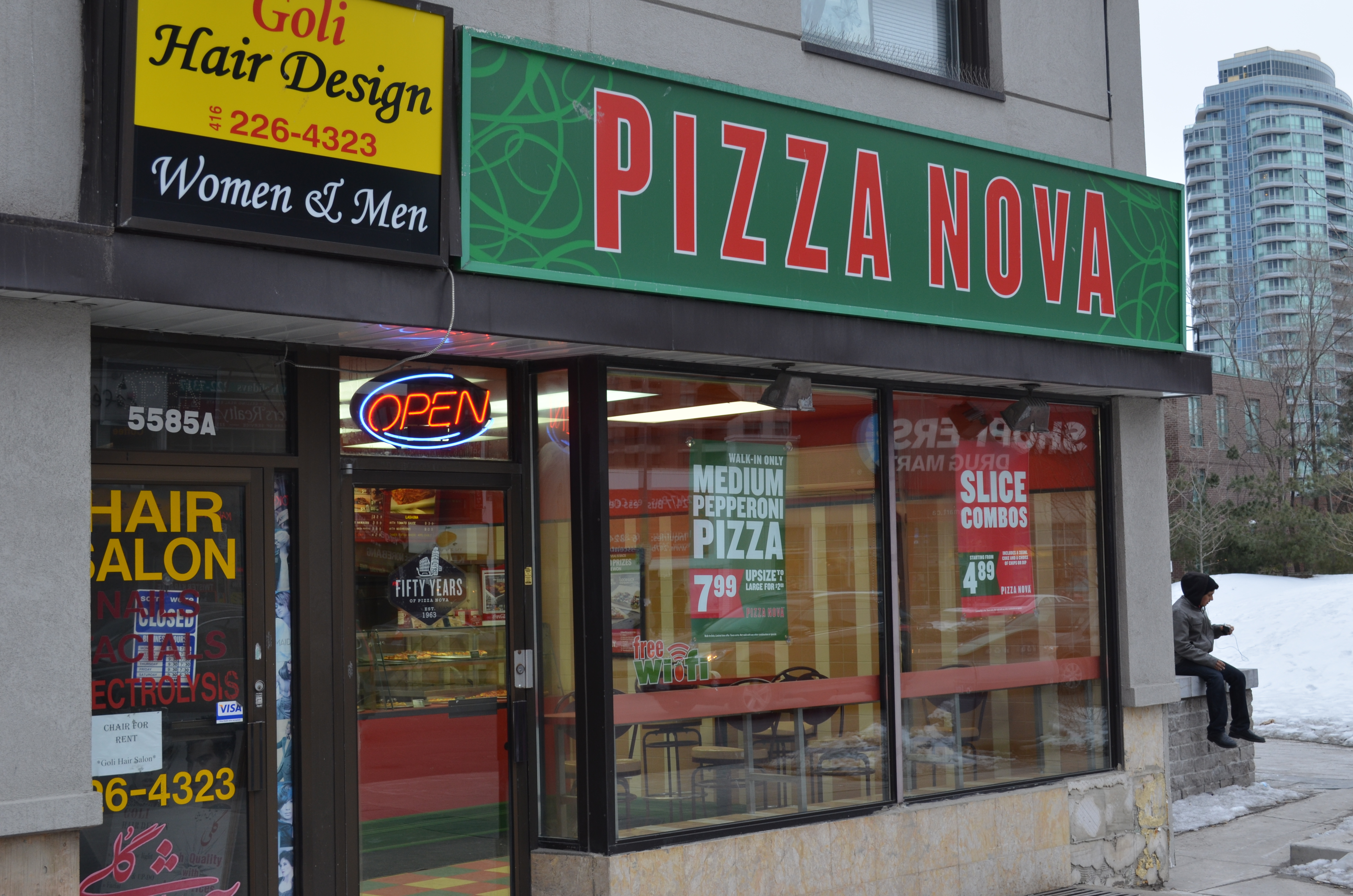
A Pizza Nova restaurant

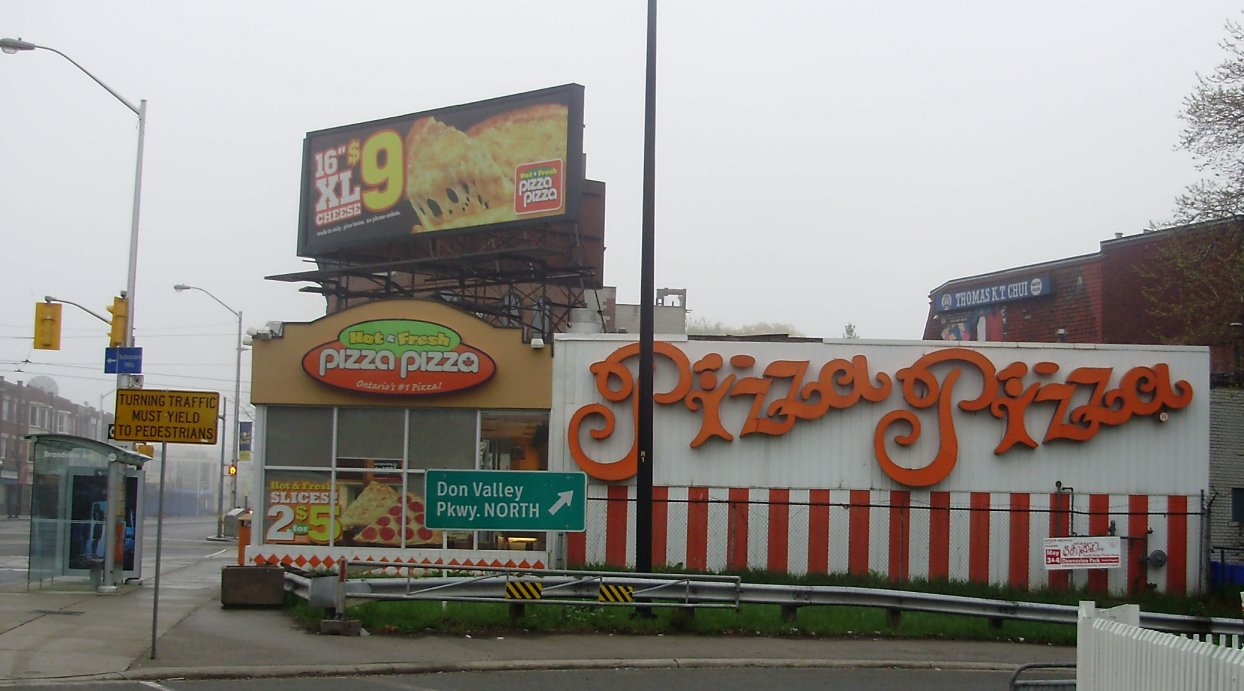
A Pizza Pizza restaurant in Toronto

== See also ==
- Pizza in Canada
- List of Canadian restaurant chains
- List of fast-food chains in Canada
- List of pizza chains
- List of pizza franchises
- Lists of restaurants
