= Pizza in Canada =

Pizza variants from Canada

Canada has many of its own pizza chains, both national and regional, and many distinctive regional variations and types of pizza resulting from influences of local Canadian cuisine.

== Regional variations ==
=== Atlantic Canada ===
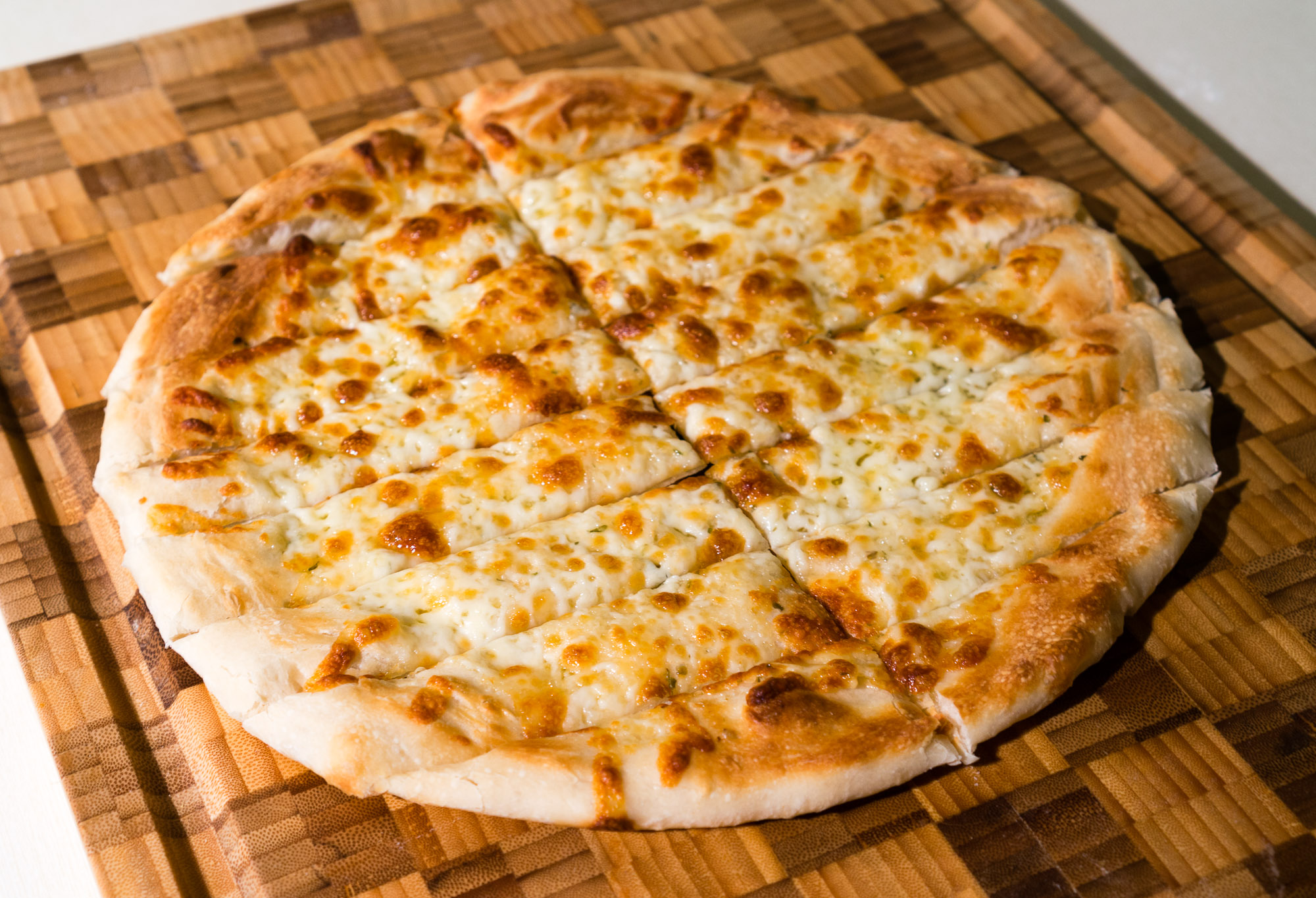
Nova Scotian garlic fingers

Atlantic Canada has several unique varieties, which have spread to other parts of the country as people migrate for work. Donair pizza is inspired by the Halifax fast food of the same name, and is topped with mozzarella cheese, donair meat, tomatoes, onions, and a sweetened condensed milk-based donair sauce.

Garlic fingers are a type of Atlantic Canadian pizza garnished with melted butter, garlic, cheese, and sometimes bacon, with the round sliced into fingers and served with donair sauce.

Pictou County pizza is a variant of pizza unique to Pictou County in Nova Scotia; this pizza has a "brown sauce" made from vegetables and spices instead of red tomato sauce.

=== Cornwall-style pizza ===
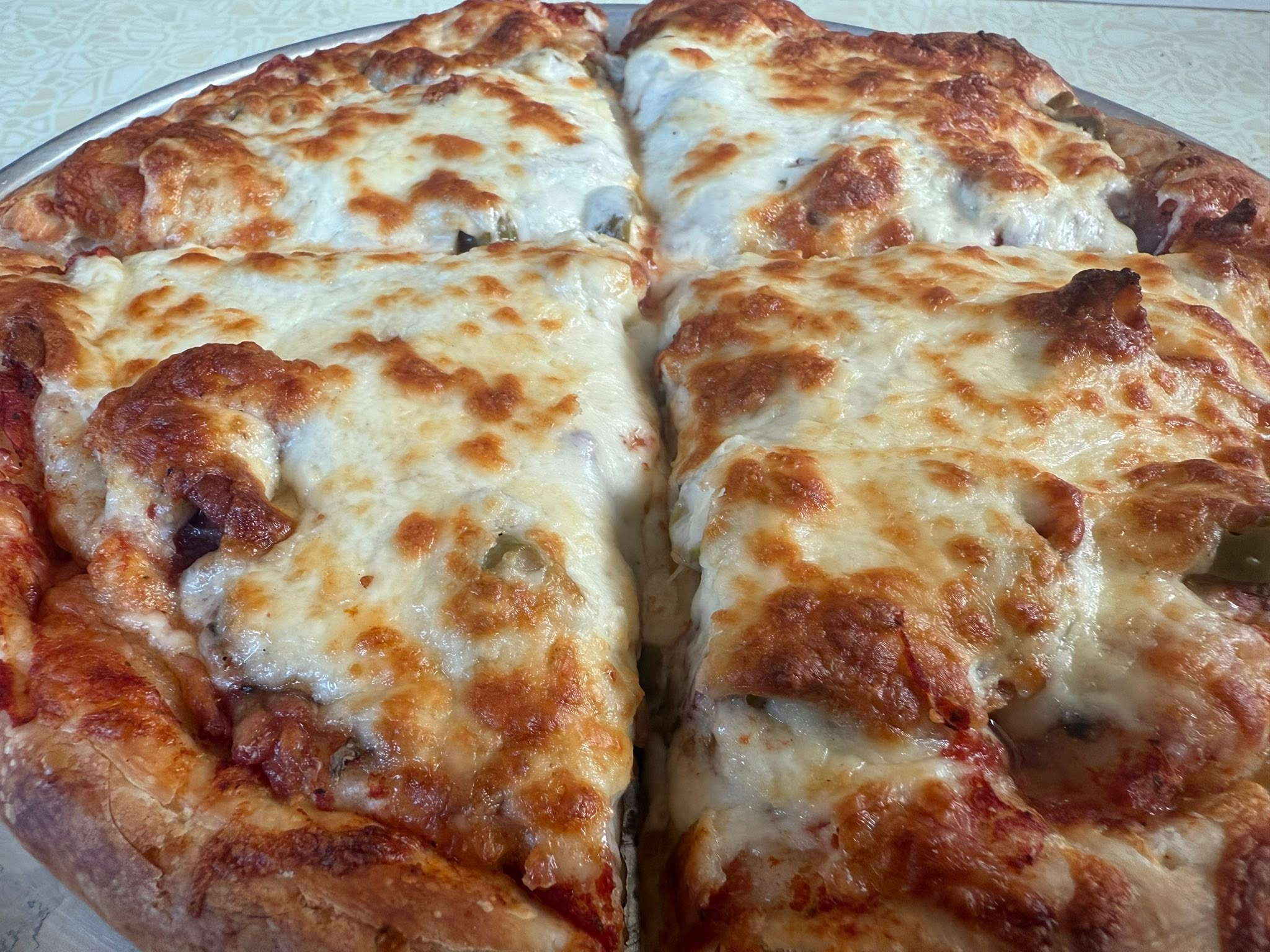
Cornwall-style pizza, all dressed, from Napoleon's

Cornwall-style pizza is known for having a layer of cheese over the toppings. The cheese being above the other toppings is similar to the Greek casserole known as moussaka.

There are at least 14 restaurants in Cornwall that all offer this style. It is likely owed to the Greek heritage of restaurateurs moving from Montreal in the 1970s and 80s. Cornwall-style pizza has thick, doughy crust.

Cornwall-style pizza is the topic of the television series Cheese on Top, which stars pizza critic Stacey Case and was co-created by comedy director Christopher Redmond.

=== Montreal-style pizza ===
The predominantly francophone Canadian province of Quebec has its specialties. One is the Montreal "all dressed": mild-spice tomato sauce, pepperoni, green pepper slices, and mushrooms. The Italian immigrant community in Montreal is known for their Rossa Romana Pizza (sometimes referred to as Pizza Rustica). This is a variety of Italian tomato pie and consists of a thick crust that is covered in a thick plain sweet tomato sauce, and often cut in square pieces and served cold. In Stoney Creek, Ontario, a similar type of cheeseless tomato pie produced by Roma Bakery is popular.

=== Ottawa-style pizza ===
Pizza from the Colonnade

Ottawa style pizza is characterized as being greasy, having sweeter sauce, crispy, thick cheese, thick crust, and toppings under the cheese. Other food writers contend Ottawa-style pizza is inextricably linked with Ottawa's Lebanese pizza tradition. Pizzerias known for their Ottawa-style pies include the Colonnade, Gabriel Pizza and Louis'.

=== Regina-style pizza ===
This style of pizza was created by Greek immigrant Jim Kolitsas in the city of Regina, Saskatchewan, during the 1970s. The pizza is made with deli meat that is piled high and green peppers as a tribute to the colours of the Saskatchewan Roughriders. Regina-Style is made in a round pizza pan, but cut into square pieces.

=== Toronto-style pizza ===
This type of pizza is available in certain restaurants in the Toronto area. It consists of thin-crust pizza brushed with garlic oil. Many of the restaurants that offer this type of pizza have a brush on the counter to allow customers to brush the garlic oil on their slice of pizzas themselves. This style of pizza was invented by Vietnamese immigrants who learned pizza-making from the former Italian owners that they worked for in Toronto. These immigrants were originally from the city of Hue in Vietnam, a city renowned for its culinary heritage.

=== Windsor-style pizza ===
Pizza in the southwestern Ontario city of Windsor is identified by its use of shredded pepperoni and mozzarella cheese from the local Galati Cheese Company. Although fresh mushrooms are the norm for most pizza makers in the city, the style was originally known for using canned mushrooms. The distinct qualities of Windsor-area pizza are believed to have originated with the now-closed Volcano Pizza in Windsor's downtown core. As employees of Volcano eventually left and founded their own pizzerias, they took the recipe with them.

== Other variations ==
=== Hawaiian pizza ===
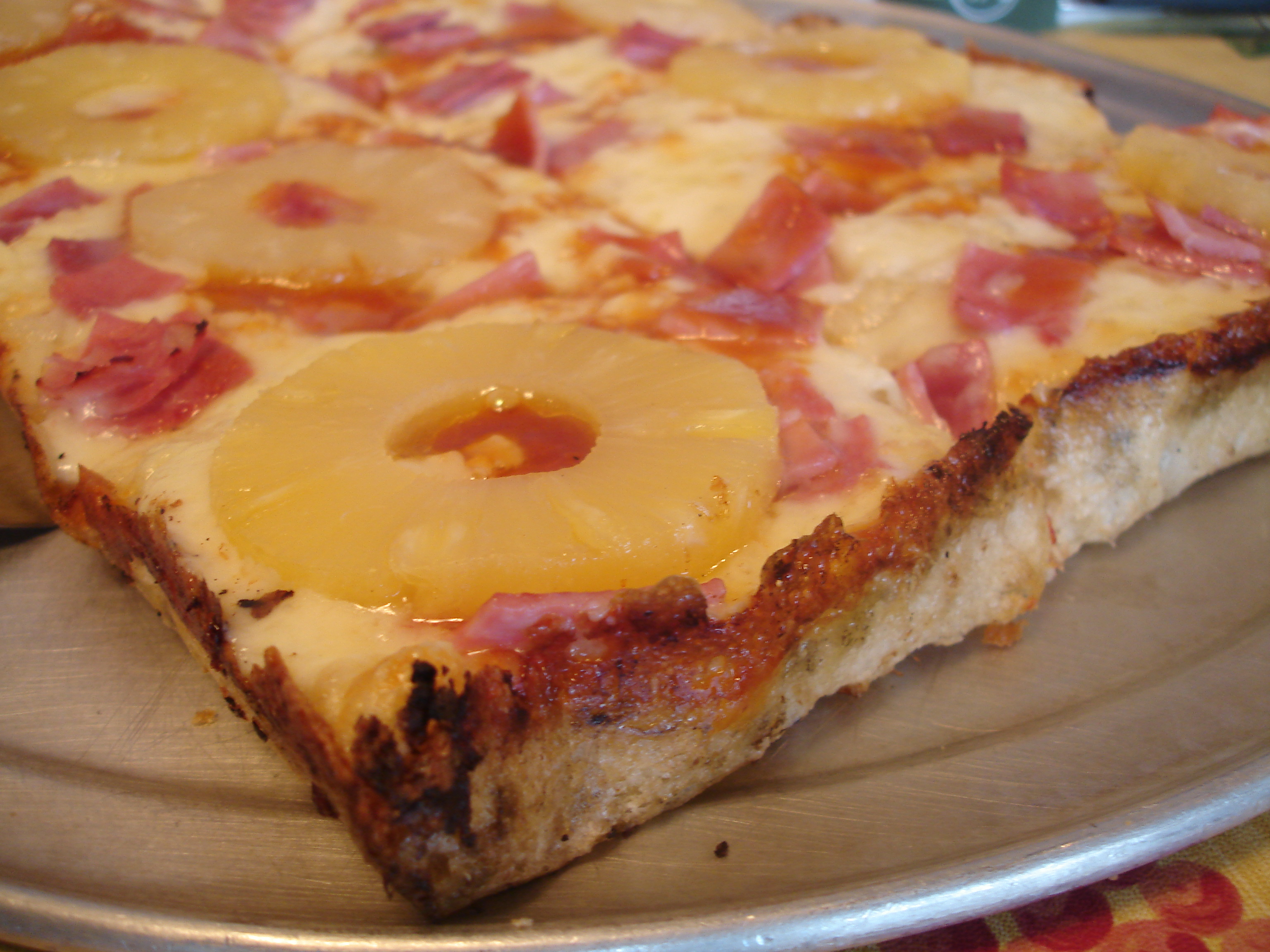
A slice of Hawaiian pizza using pineapple slices

The Hawaiian-style (tomato sauce, ham and pineapple) is a Canadian invention, originating at the Satellite Restaurant in Chatham, Ontario. Owner Sam Panopoulos first concocted the Hawaiian pizza in 1962. By that time Satellite had already started serving Canadian Chinese food and Panopoulos thought people would like a similar dish with sweet and savoury flavours together, so he took a can of pineapple and tossed the fruit onto a pizza.

=== Indian-style pizza ===
Another variety of the dish in parts of the country is Indian-style pizza (also known as Punjabi-style pizza or Desi-style pizza) which has gradually gained popularity since originating in Greater Vancouver during the mid-1980s. Indian-style pizza has since expanded across urban centres in western and central Canada with large South Asian populations, including Greater Vancouver, Calgary, Edmonton, Regina, Winnipeg, Ottawa, and Greater Toronto, later expanding to other regions. This type of pizza typically includes sauce with mixed spices and toppings such as cilantro, ginger, spinach, cauliflower, tandoori chicken, butter chicken, or paneer.

=== Pizza cake ===
Pizza cake is a Canadian multiple-layer pizza baked in a pot or cake pan. First invented by Boston Pizza, a Canadian multinational restaurant chain, recipes were posted online as early as April 2014, though they did not become viral until the Pillsbury Company posted an example in September 2014. Reviews have been mixed, with praise aimed at its taste and criticism leveled at its complexity and unhealthiness.

=== Pizza-ghetti ===
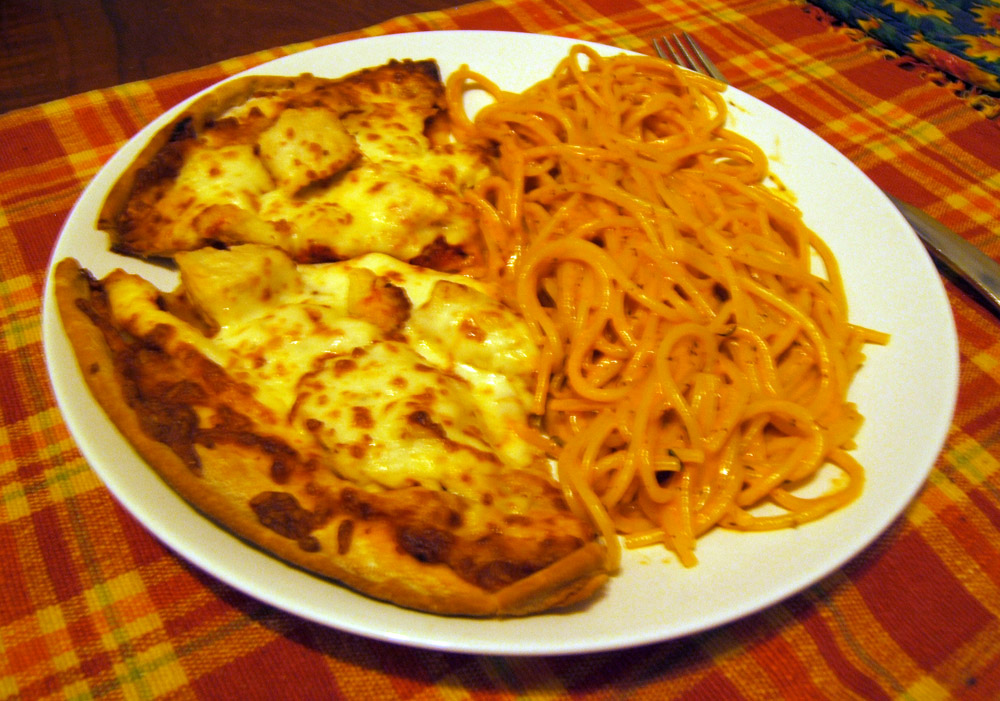
The pizza-ghetti, a combination dish from Quebec

Pizza-ghetti is a combination meal commonly found in fast food or family restaurants throughout the province of Quebec and other parts of Canada, consisting of a regular pizza slice accompanied with a portion of spaghetti with tomato-based sauce.

A common variation is the pizza-caesar, where the spaghetti is replaced with caesar salad. Another is a slightly more elaborate presentation consisting in a miniature pizza, sliced in half with the pasta in the middle. Other variants found mostly in Montréal and its suburbs include spaghetti as a pizza topping placed under the mozzarella cheese.

=== Poutine pizza ===
Poutine pizza is one variety that can be found sporadically across the country, and adaptations of this item have even been featured in upscale restaurants.

=== Sushi pizza ===
Sushi pizza is a pizza imitation with sushi ingredients. It consists of a fried rice patty topped with a sauce, often sriracha, and vegetables and fish or other seafood. This mimics the style of pizza—crust, sauce and toppings—with completely different ingredients.

== See also ==
- History of pizza
- List of Canadian pizza chains
- List of pizza varieties by country
