= Pizza Corner =

Pizza Corner may refer to:

- Pizza Corner (Halifax), an intersection in Canada
- Pizza Corner (restaurant), a defunct Indian chain
