= Pizza Salvatore =

Canadian pizza restaurant chain

Pizza Salvatoré
- Logo
- Industry: Restaurant
- Genre: Pizzeria
- Founded: 1964; 62 years ago in Saint-Georges, Quebec, Canada
- Founder: Salvatore Abbatiello and Angèle Fecteau
- Number of locations: 121 (2025)
- Area served: Quebec; Ontario; New Brunswick; Nova Scotia
- Website: salvatore.com

Pizza Salvatoré is a Canadian pizza restaurant franchise headquartered in Quebec City, Quebec, Canada operating mainly in Quebec, with additional locations in Ontario, New Brunswick and Nova Scotia. As of July 2024, the chain has 93 locations, 85 of which are in Quebec, 4 in New Brunswick, 3 in Ontario, and 1 in Nova Scotia.

== History ==
The first pizzeria was opened in 1964 in Saint-Georges, Quebec, by Italian immigrant Salvatore Abbatiello and his Beauceronne wife, Angèle Fecteau.

The chain only had 13 locations in 2018, when 5 of Abbatiello's grandchildren bought the chain, with plans to expand into Ontario and New Brunswick.

Pizza Salvatoré sold frozen pizzas in supermarkets from September 2023 until April 2024, when it announced pulling out of the market.

On 1 March, 2025, the chain's co-president, Guillaume Jr Abbatiello, went on a Ici Radio-Canada Première talk show alongside Quebec Culture Minister Mathieu Lacombe. After the show, Abbatiello posted a video to social media claiming that when his business does not work, he does not ask the government for money, in reference to government subsidies for culture. His remarks sparked controversy in Quebec, drawing criticism from Lacombe. Abbatiello later apologized.

== Disputes ==
Pizza Salvatoré has had issues with phone numbers being similar to their competitors, allegedly stealing customers. In 2021, Pizza Salvatoré's restaurant in Drummondville got a formal notice from Pizza Pizza for a phone number ending in 1111, similar to Pizza Pizza's restaurants' phone numbers, who all end in 1111. Later, in 2022, a local pizza chain accused the restaurant in Trois-Rivières of having a similar phone number, ending in 7777, to its four restaurants. The case was sent to the courts.

== See also ==
- List of Canadian pizza chains
