= Grinner's Food Systems =

Canadian restaurant franchise company

- Type: Restaurant franchise
- Industry: Food service
- Headquarters: Canada
- Products: Food and drink
- Revenue: $30 million
- Parent: Trucorp Investments Incorporated
- Subsidiaries: Greco Pizza and Captain Submarine, Frank and Gino's
- Website: Grinners Food System's Website

Grinner's Food Systems, Ltd. is an Eastern Canadian company that franchises the restaurant chains Greco Pizza and Captain Submarine, and frozen yoghurt chain Frozu!. It is based in Truro, Nova Scotia. The company is owned by Trucorp Investments Inc. of Dieppe, New Brunswick.

William Hay is the chairman of Trucorp, which also owns Bonte Foods, Ltd., Frank and Gino's restaurant, and Chris Brothers food products. The company ranked 77th out of 101 top companies in Atlantic Canada in 2004. The Grinner's division earned a revenue of $30.4 million in 2008.

== Major franchises ==
=== Greco Pizza and Captain Submarine ===
Greco Pizza was established in Moncton, New Brunswick in 1977, and has since grown to one of Atlantic Canada's largest pizza chains. Menu items include pizza, donair, salad, and the restaurant's proprietary dipping sauces.

Captain Submarine was acquired by Grinner's in 2002, with nine locations (twenty-one fewer than there were in the 1980s). The purchase raised the number of Grinner's franchised restaurants from 111 to 120.

Both Greco Pizza and Captain Submarine are quick-service restaurant chains, which are often co-branded. There are over 170 Greco Pizza locations across Quebec, Ontario, New Brunswick, Nova Scotia, and Newfoundland.

=== Frank and Gino's ===
Frank and Gino's is a restaurant with locations in Amherst and Truro, Nova Scotia owned by Grinner's. The menu includes pizza, pasta, seafood and beef entrees.

== See also ==
- List of Canadian restaurant chains
