= King of Donair =

Canadian restaurant chain

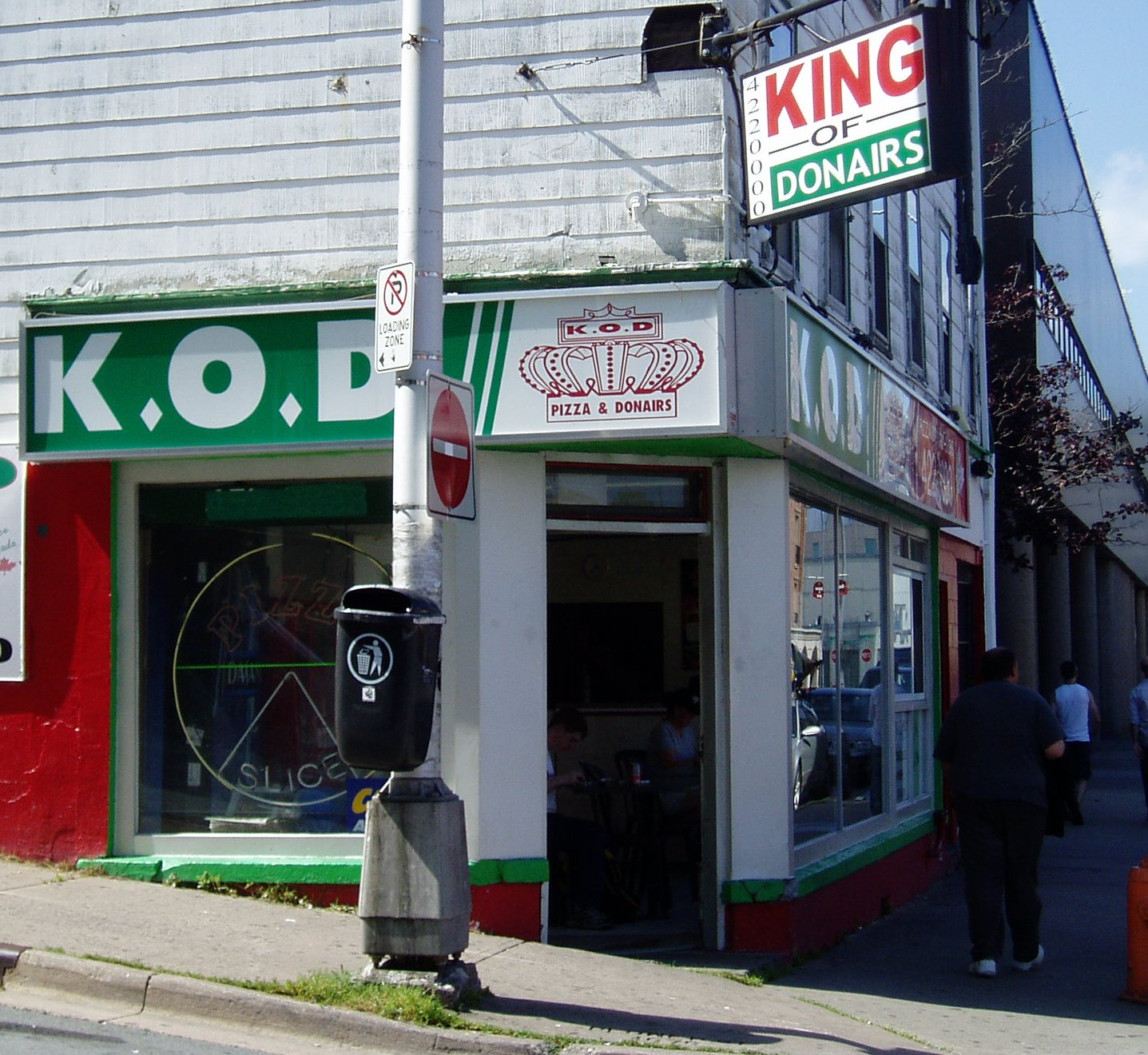
- King of Donair at Pizza Corner in Halifax
- Type: Locally owned subsidiary
- Industry: Fast food
- Founded: Halifax, Nova Scotia (1973; 53 years ago)
- Headquarters: Halifax, Nova Scotia
- Products: Pizza, garlic fingers, donairs, poutine, chicken wings, poppers, egg rolls
- Website: www.kingofdonair.ca

King of Donair (often abbreviated KOD, and also branded as King of Donairs) is a chain of restaurants that was established in Halifax, Nova Scotia, in 1973 by Greek immigrant Peter Gamoulakos, who popularized the donair in the city. The brand has a cult-like following, and has been featured by Trailer Park Boys, National Geographic, the Food Network, the Travel Channel and Vice Media. Celebrity chefs such as Anthony Bourdain, Andrew Zimmern, Dominique Crenn, and Matty Matheson chose King of Donair for filming, documenting and indulging. In 2015, the donair was named the official dish of Halifax, with December 8 being National Donair Day.

In addition to the donair, KOD is also known for its pizza, garlic fingers and other donair offerings such as donair egg rolls, donair plates, and donair pizza.

== History ==
=== Origins ===
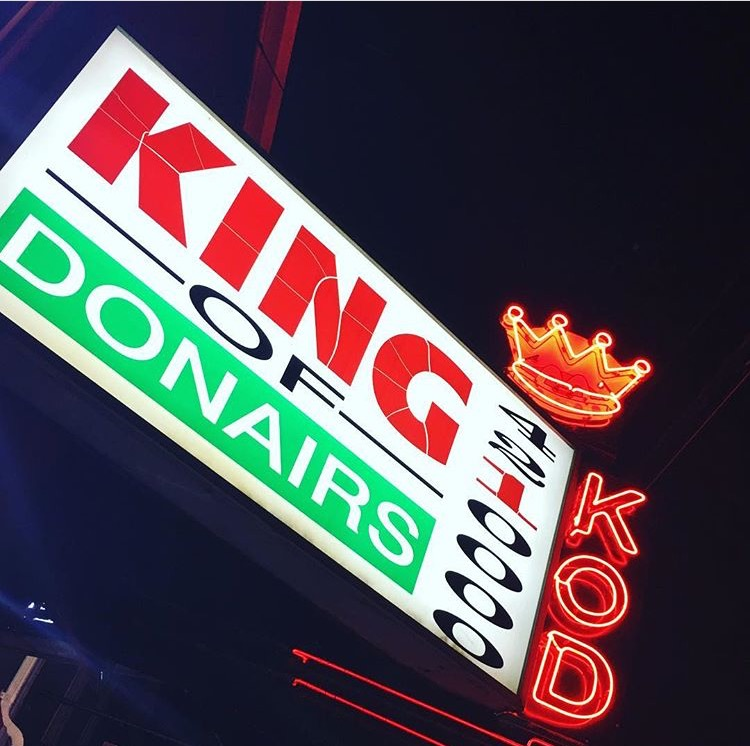
King of Donair - Canada's Original since 1973

The first King of Donair opened in 1973 on Quinpool Rd. in Halifax, Nova Scotia. It was founded by Greek immigrant and restaurateur Peter Gamoulakos, who owned a pizza shop called Velo's Pizza. While on trip to Greece, he ate a lot of gyros and was inspired to bring the dish to Canada. After trying to sell them at his pizza shop, he realized that Nova Scotians of the 1970s didn't have a palate for lamb and the yogurt-based tzatziki. He substituted spicy beef for lamb and created a sweet sauce made with evaporated milk. It became popular in Halifax in the 1970s. After perfecting the recipe, King of Donair was opened in 1973.

The original King of Donair is located in the same building on Quinpool Rd. The chain has four other locations in Nova Scotia.

=== Western Canada expansion ===
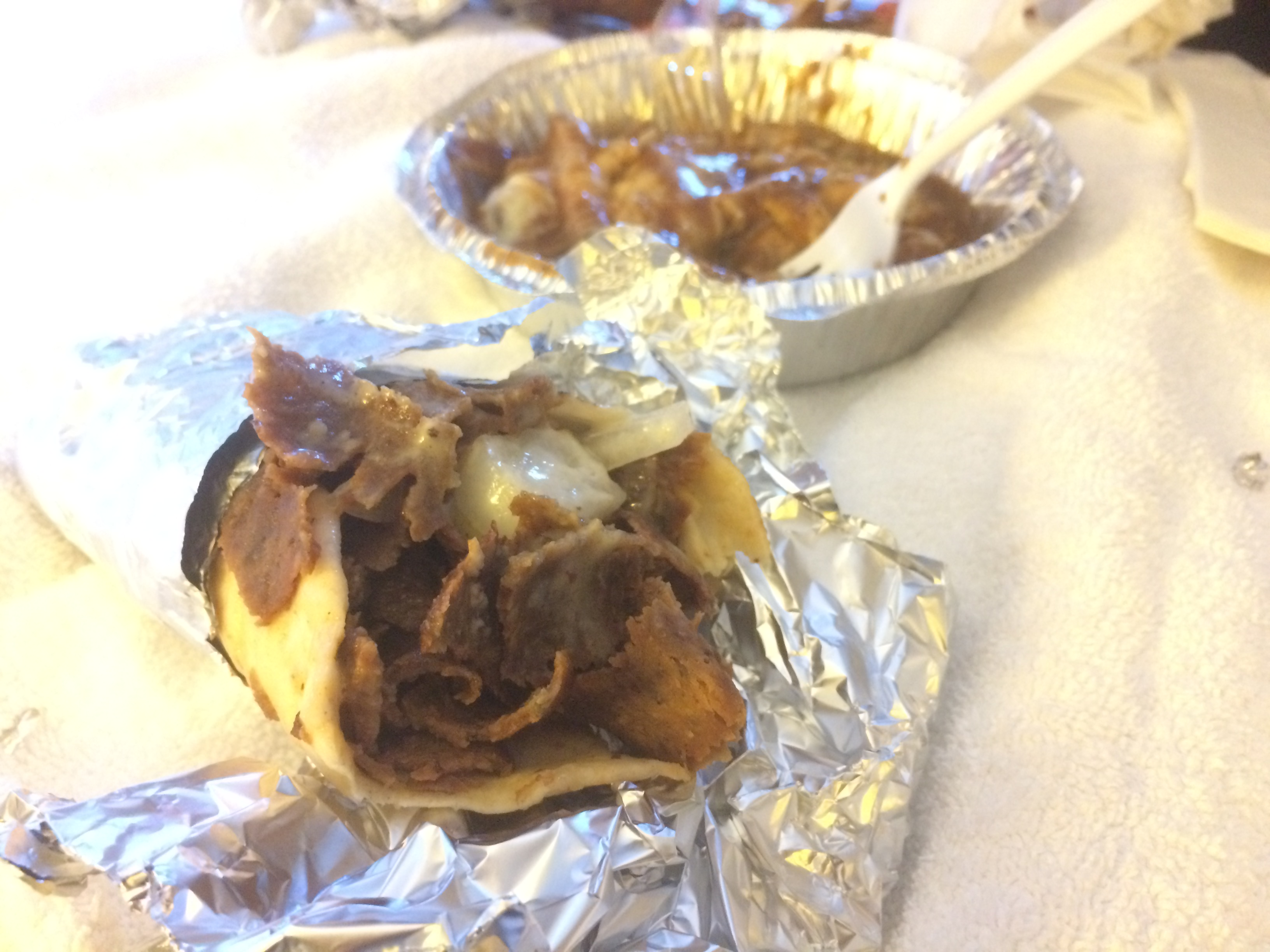
Donair and poutine

The 2010s saw an expansion into Western Canada, beginning with pop-up shops in Alberta to test for economic viability. A two-day event was planned for March 4 in Calgary and March 5 in Banff National Park's Sunshine Village. The latter event was cancelled due to concerns about crowd size, while the Calgary event continued and raised money for the Alberta Children's Hospital.

In 2018, two restaurants were opened, in Edmonton and Grande Prairie, Alberta. 2019 saw further expansion with a third Alberta location in Sherwood Park and its first Saskatchewan location in the Erindale Shopping Centre within the University Heights Suburban Centre in Saskatoon.

Other cities announced in the Western Canada expansion were Vancouver, Kelowna and Victoria in British Columbia, Regina, Saskatchewan, and Winnipeg, Manitoba. It was reported that KOD planned to have at least one location in British Columbia by the end of 2018 with a total of ten that were expected to open that year.

== Disputes ==
In May 2012, the KOD location that was on the aptly named "Pizza Corner" in Halifax was closed due to the disrepair of the rented building. Owner Sam Nahas notified landlord John Manolopoulos that the lease was not being renewed for this reason, and took Manolopoulos to small claims court to be reimbursed $25,000 on various repairs to the old building. The restaurant had been a staple of Pizza Corner since the early 1990s.

In 2015, KOD alleged that the Vancouver restaurant Donair King was infringing on its trademarks such as name and logo. KOD filed documents with the Federal Court of Canada saying its name has been associated with donairs, donair meat and donair sauce since the 1970s. The claim asked the court to order them to destroy menus, signs, packaging, promotional material, and business cards with the Donair King name. It also asked for punitive and exemplary damages as well as the legal costs to be covered. Donair King denied the allegations in a statement of defence, and offered to stop using the Donair King name if King of Donair agreed to take no legal action. The statement of claim was filed Sept. 23 and Donair King filed its defence Oct. 26.

Calgary was planned as one of the first cities to be included in KOD's Western Canada expansion in 2016. The company filed a statement of claim in April 2016 that stated donair establishments in Calgary such as King Donair and Shawrama, King Donair and King Shwarnae Donair, all registered under the numbered company 974819 Alberta Ltd., were active during this time and infringing on its trademark. Owner Norman Nahas cited that people would think KOD is already in Western Canada. 974819 Alberta Ltd. had yet to file a statement of defence during that time. King of Donair alleges that it previously wrote to King Donair, asking it to "cease and desist from its infringing and otherwise unlawful activities", to no effect, court documents state.

== Pop culture ==
- On April 18, 2004; King of Donair first appears in the season 4 episode of Trailer Park Boys entitled "A Man's Gotta Eat". Randy (played by Patrick Roach) frequently visits for donairs where he prostitutes himself for coupons.
- Rapper Quake Matthews released a single in 2015 entitled "Down With the King" which samples Run-DMC's "Down with the King" and a tribute to the donair and King of Donair. It features Randy and T from Trailer Park Boys.

== Awards and honours ==
Winner of The Coast's Best of Halifax Reader's Choice Award for Best Donair: 1998, 2001–2003, 2006–2010, and 2013–2016 (14 of 19 years). Hall of Fame (2018-2019)
