= Greco Pizza =

Atlantic Canadian pizza chain

- Company type: Locally owned subsidiary
- Industry: Fast food, Donairs, Pizza
- Founded: Moncton, New Brunswick (1977; 49 years ago)
- Headquarters: Truro, Nova Scotia
- Products: Pizza, Garlic Fingers, OvenSubs, Donairs
- Website: greco.ca

Greco Pizza is a franchise restaurant chain consisting of over 100 outlets in Eastern Canada. The restaurants also deliver pizza. Greco bills itself as the largest pizza chain in Atlantic Canada.

== History ==
The first Greco Pizza opened in 1977 in Moncton, New Brunswick, as Greco Donair...and Pizza. In 1981, the franchise rights were sold to Grinner's Food Systems Ltd. of Truro, Nova Scotia.

Many Greco locations in rural areas are known as "Greco Express" outlets; they are typically associated with a motel, convenience store, or other existing establishment. In some locations, the Greco franchise is associated with a Captain Submarine franchise, another of Grinner's properties.

== Marketing ==
Since 1995, Greco has marketed itself using the telephone number 310-30-30 with an associated jingle. From 1995 to the early 2000s, this number was pronounced in the official jingle as "three one oh, three oh, three oh". In the early 2000s, this was changed to "three ten, thirty thirty".

== See also ==
- List of Canadian restaurant chains
- Lists of corporate assets
