= Pizza Nova =

Canadian pizza restaurant chain

Pizza Nova Take Out Ltd.

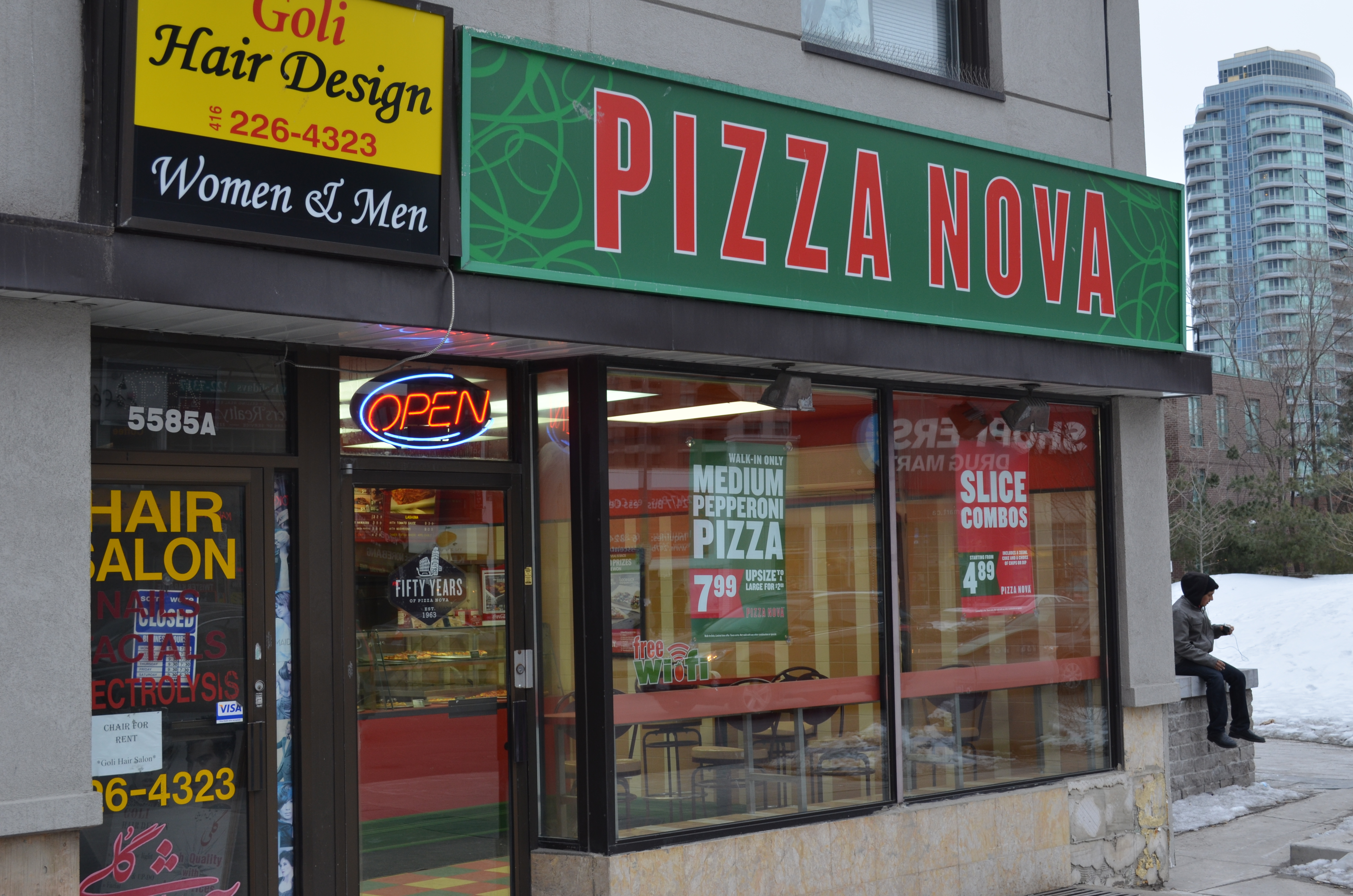
- Pizza Nova on Yonge Street
- Industry: Restaurants
- Founded: May 12, 1963; 63 years ago in Dorset Park, Scarborough, Ontario, Canada
- Founder: Sam Primucci
- Headquarters: 2272 Lawrence Avenue East; Scarborough, Ontario, Canada; M1P 2P9
- Number of locations: 150+ stores
- Area served: Ontario
- Key people: Domenic Primucci (President)
- Products: Pizza, Panzerotti, Sandwiches, Chicken wings
- Website: www.pizzanova.com

Pizza Nova Take Out Ltd., doing business as Pizza Nova, is a Canadian franchise chain of pizza restaurants headquartered in Scarborough, Ontario. The chain was founded on May 12, 1963, by a family of Italian immigrants. The first restaurant was located in the eastern Toronto suburb of Scarborough, Ontario, on Kennedy Road near Lawrence Avenue, which currently operates under the name Nova Ristorante. There are more than 150 locations in Canada.

== History ==
The chain was founded by a young family of Italian immigrants — consisting of Sam Primucci, and his brothers Mike, Vince, and Joe — originating from Palazzo San Gervasio Basilicata, Italy. Their first location opened on May 12, 1963, at the corner of Lawrence Avenue East, just west of Kennedy Road.

Following many years of success in both their delivery and walk-in services, the restaurant opened their first franchised store in 1969.

Upon celebrating the company's 50th anniversary, the pizza chain also announced their partnership with the Toronto Blue Jays and the Rogers Centre as their official pizza supplier, starting in January 2014, and continuing for a three-year agreement.

In 2013, Pizza Nova was featured on the Canadian version of the show Undercover Boss, in the ninth episode of season three, titled "Pizza Nova."

== Jingle ==
In October 1987, jingle writer Syd Kessler, advertising agency Montana Steele, and Pizza Nova President Sam Primucci produced an advertisement featuring the singing of the phone number and vocalising the quadruple zero as "4-3-9, Oh-Oh Oh-Oh Pizza Nova!" Sung by Canadian musician Zappacosta, edits of the original can still be heard on Ontario radio and TV today, with new voiceover by company President Domenic Primucci, son of founder Sam Primucci.

== Products ==
Some of Pizza Nova's signature products include:

=== Signature pizzas ===
- Banquet Cheddar
- Calabrese
- Deluxe
- Napoletana
- Primavera
- Pizza Pollo
- Porco Pazzo
- Roasted Parma
- Meat Supreme
- Pepperoni
- The All-Star
- Quattro Stagioni
- Mediterranean
- Portabellissimo
- Super Gourmet
- Super Hawaiian
- Veggie
- Cheddar Supreme

=== Pesto pizzas ===
- Chicken Florentine
- Tuscan Pesto

=== White pizzas ===
- Bruschetta Pizza
- Basilcata
- California
- Chicken Alla Bianca
- Greek Bruschetta
- Il Giardino
- Porchetta and Hot Peppers
- Spicy Porchetta
- Nonna's favourite

The beverages that Pizza Nova sells are Coca-Cola products. Pizza Nova has also started to cater to vegans as it offers dairy-free cheese, and as of 2021, plant based pepperoni.

== See also ==
- List of Canadian pizza chains
