= Windsor-style pizza =

Medium-thick cornmeal crust pizza with shredded pepperoni

- Windsor-style pizza with shredded pepperoni, canned mushrooms and green peppers
- Type: Pizza
- Place of origin: Canada
- Region or state: Windsor, Ontario

Windsor-style pizza is a Canadian style of pizza common in Windsor, Ontario characterized by its ingredients. It uses medium-thick to thick cornmeal and flour—based crust and high-fat mozzarella cheese. Its pepperoni is shredded to spread it out and to avoid grease puddles. Mushrooms used are canned to prevent burning. The style is believed to have been invented by Volcano Pizzeria in the late 1950s or early 1960s, and became the dominant pizza style around Windsor and beloved by locals by the mid-1980s. The style remains popular among both current and former residents of Windsor and has often prompted long-distance orders. It has led to the dominance of locally-owned pizzerias in Windsor and pizzerias serving the style have opened in other cities such as Toronto.

== Description ==
Windsor pizzas have a chewy, thick-textured crust made with flour and cornmeal. The crust has been described as medium-thick or thick but thinner than Sicilian pizza crust. The sauce features a blend of spices with a high amount of oregano. The mozzarella cheese used is high in fat and most pizzerias in Windsor source their cheese from the Windsor-based Galati Cheese Company. Most of the ingredients are sourced locally. The pepperoni on Windsor-style pizzas is shredded, done to ensure the pepperoni taste is in every bite and to prevent the formation of grease puddles. Mushrooms used to top Windsor-style pizzas are canned rather than fresh, to prevent burning.

The most popular type of Windsor-style pizza is the Super, featuring shredded pepperoni, bacon, mushrooms, and green peppers.

== History ==
Windsor-style pizza is believed to have been invented by Volcano Pizzeria, though other restaurants claim to have invented the recipe themselves instead; Volcano Pizzeria was founded by cousins Gino Manza and Frank Gualtieri. It was originally a diner selling Italian food before becoming the first Windsor restaurant to serve pizza in either 1957 or the early 1960s, around when other pizzerias began to operate in the city. Some pizzerias in Windsor have confirmed they trace their recipe back to Volcano Pizzeria.

Other restaurants that have been associated with the Windsor-style pizza include Sam's Pizzeria, Mario’s Restaurant, and Capri Pizzeria. There is no evidence any of them sold pizza until the 1960s, though Sam's and Mario's were established in the 1940s. The number of pizzerias in the city increased in subsequent years, as the dish became more popular in Canada. By the mid-1980s, Windsor-style pizza had become beloved among locals. Additionally, Americans had begun regularly visiting Windsor pizzerias. A 1992 Windsor Star article stated Windsor had started the trend of flatbread pizza in Canada.

== Impact ==
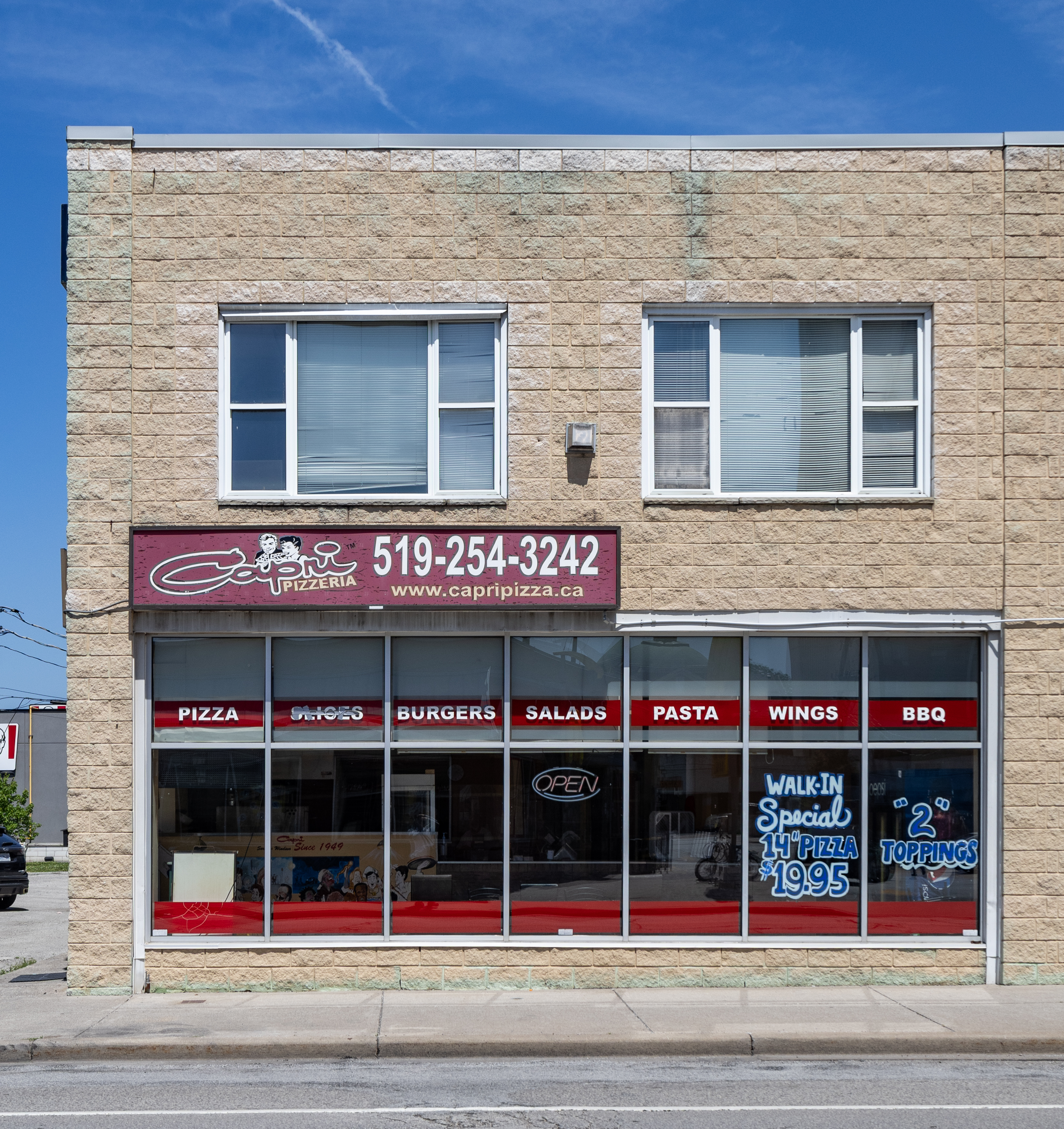
Capri Pizzeria, one of several pizzeria chains based in Windsor

Due to the popularity of Windsor-style pizza in Windsor, most pizzerias in Windsor are locally owned rather than part of a national chain. In 2024, Postmedia ran a poll which found Windsor to be its readers' favourite Canadian pizza city. According to the 2022 documentary The Pizza City You've Never Heard of, Windsor has the most pizzerias per capita in Canada. Galati Cheese manager Peter Piazza stated to the National Post in 2024 that the city has approximately 200 pizzerias. Windsor-style pizzerias have opened in Calgary and Toronto. Former Windsorites have ordered pizzas from thousands of kilometres away, which one pizzeria owner stated occurred at least a few times every month.

Windsor-style pizza by Armando's received third place in the 2013 International Pizza Expo in Las Vegas; Armando's chef Dean Litster was later named 2018 Chef of the Year by Canadian Pizza Mag. In 2020, music promoters George Kalivas and Tristan Laughton made The Pizza City You've Never Heard of, a documentary about Windsor's pizza, believing it stood among the best pizza cities worldwide. The documentary was released in 2022. In 2024, a post on X showing the shredded pepperoni went viral, being viewed over 10 million times and sparking an online debate.
