= Dorset Park =

Neighbourhood in Toronto, Ontario, Canada

- Neighbourhood
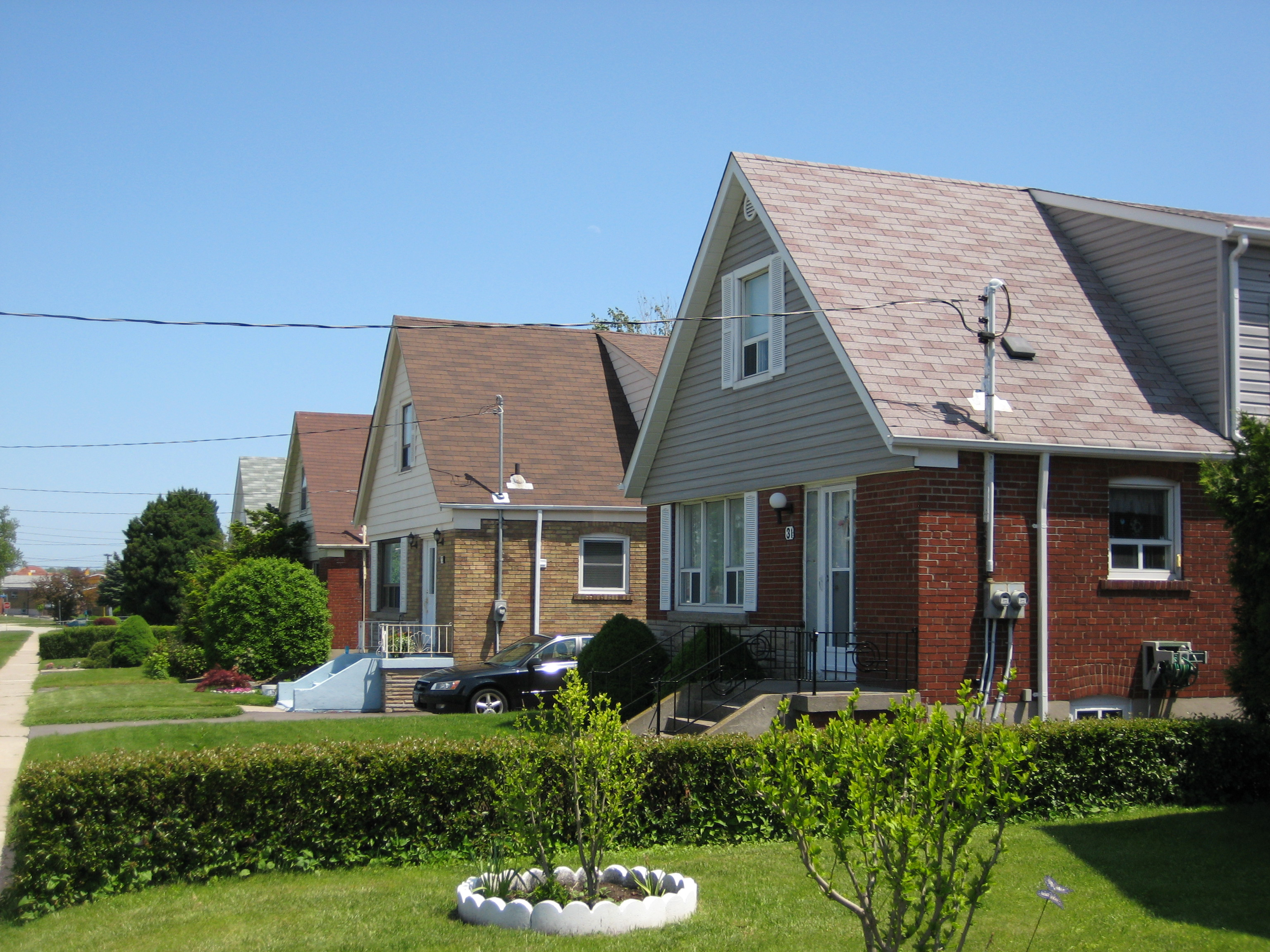
- Residences in Dorset Park

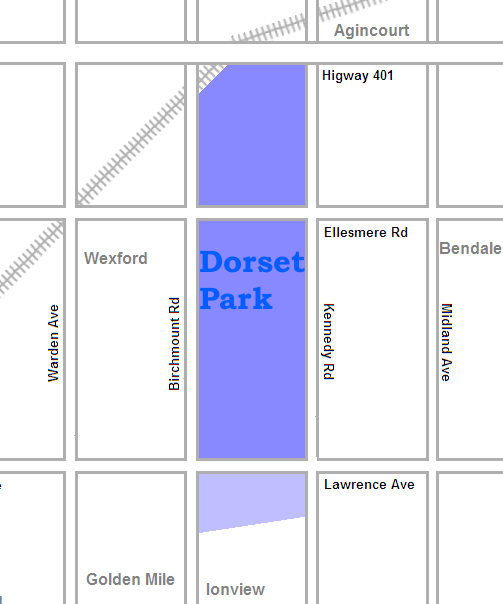
- Coordinates: 43°45′55″N 79°16′52″W
- Country: Canada
- Province: Ontario
- City: Toronto
- Established municipality: 1850 Scarborough Township
- Changed municipality: 1998 Toronto from City of Scarborough

Government
  - MP: Salma Zahid (Scarborough Centre)
  - MPP: David Smith (Scarborough Centre)
  - Councillor: Michael Thompson (Ward 37 Scarborough Centre)
- Elevation: 40 m (130 ft)
- Time zone: UTC-5 (EST)
  - Summer (DST): UTC-4 (EDT)
- Area codes: (416), (437) and (647)

Dorset Park is a neighbourhood in Toronto, Ontario, Canada. It is located in the western part of the district of Scarborough. The neighbourhood is bordered by Highway 401 to the north, Midland Avenue to the east, Lawrence Avenue to the south, and Birchmount Road to the west. Kennedy Road runs along the neighbourhood's centre north and south and Ellesmere Road runs along the centre east and west. The area south of Lawrence Avenue, north of the hydro corridor, is known as McGregor Park and is often included as part of Dorset Park.

The business district of Scarborough is carried right through the heart of Dorset Park along Kennedy Road from Highway 401 to Lawrence Avenue. The business district along Kennedy Road is a 3.5 kilometre stretch of the road with nothing but stores, businesses and high rise buildings. Kennedy Commons, a large strip mall, is located on Kennedy Road, between Highway 401 and Ellesmere Road.

== History ==
The area was formerly farmland, with the majority of the housing built in the 1950s. Among the landmarks are Pizza Nova, founded in 1963.

== Education ==
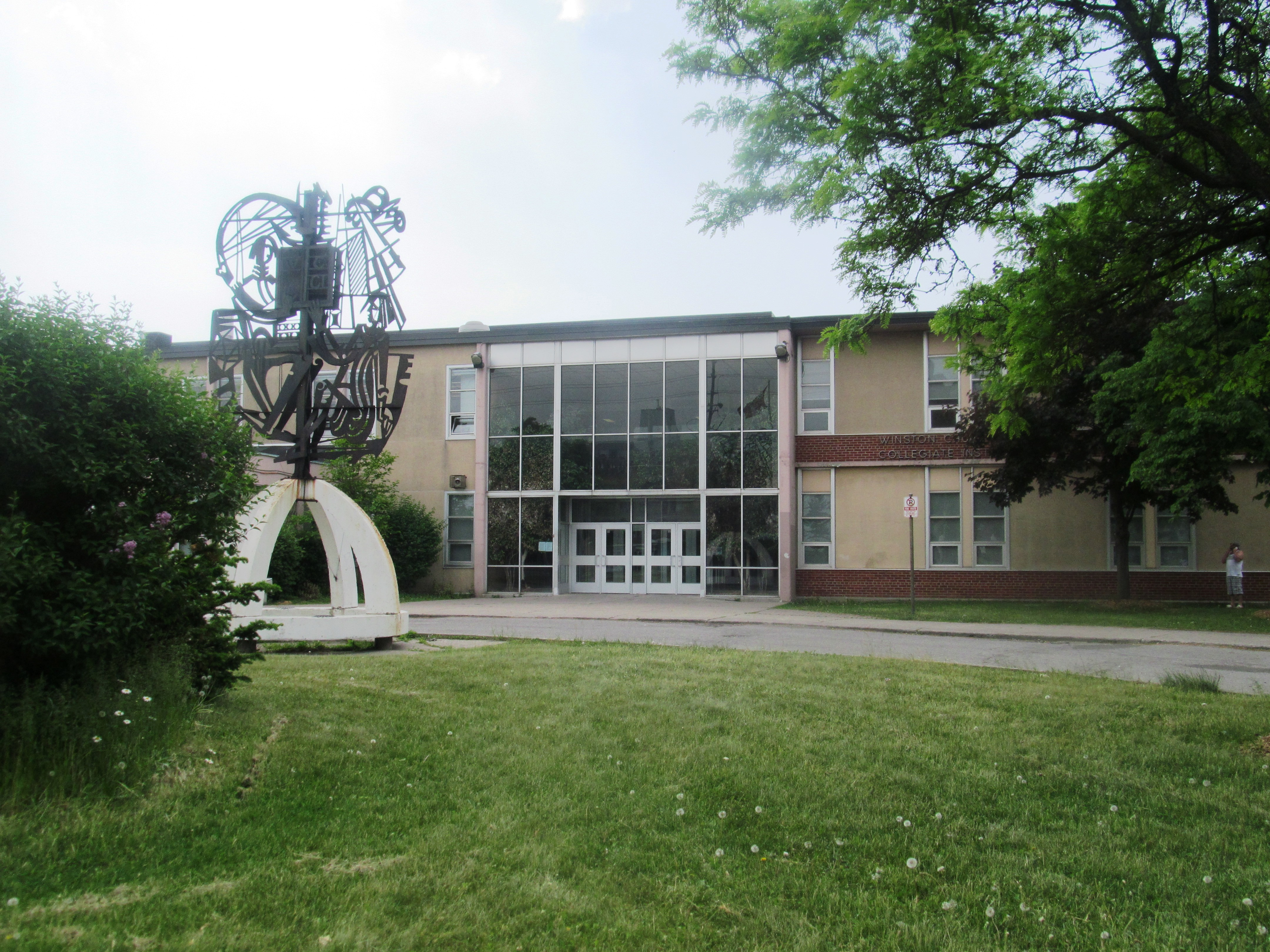
Winston Churchill Collegiate Institute is a public secondary school in Dorset Park.

One public school board operates schools in Dorset Park, the secular Toronto District School Board (TDSB). Public elementary schools operated by TDSB include:

- General Crerar Public School
- Dorset Park Public School
- Ellesmere-Statton Public School is an elementary school located on Ellesmere Road between Birchmount and Kennedy Roads. This school is a merger of two schools, Ellesmere Junior Public School (founded in 1953, replacing S.S No. 4 that opened in the 1840s) and Wendell Statton Senior Public School (built in 1972 and opened in September 1973). Both buildings are connected to each other and the school has a diverse population of 640 students. It is named after long time Scarborough educator Wendell W. Statton, who was a principal of Ellesmere P.S.
- Glamorgan Public Junior School.

TDSB also operates one secondary school, Winston Churchill Collegiate Institute.

Schooling for students residing in Dorset Park is also provided by the public school boards, the Toronto Catholic District School Board (TCDSB), and Conseil scolaire catholique MonAvenir (CSCM), Conseil scolaire Viamonde (CSM). CSCM and TCDSB are separate school boards, the former being French first language separate school board, whereas CSV is a French-first language secular school board.

== See also ==
- List of neighborhoods in Scarborough
