= Panago =

Canadian pizza chain

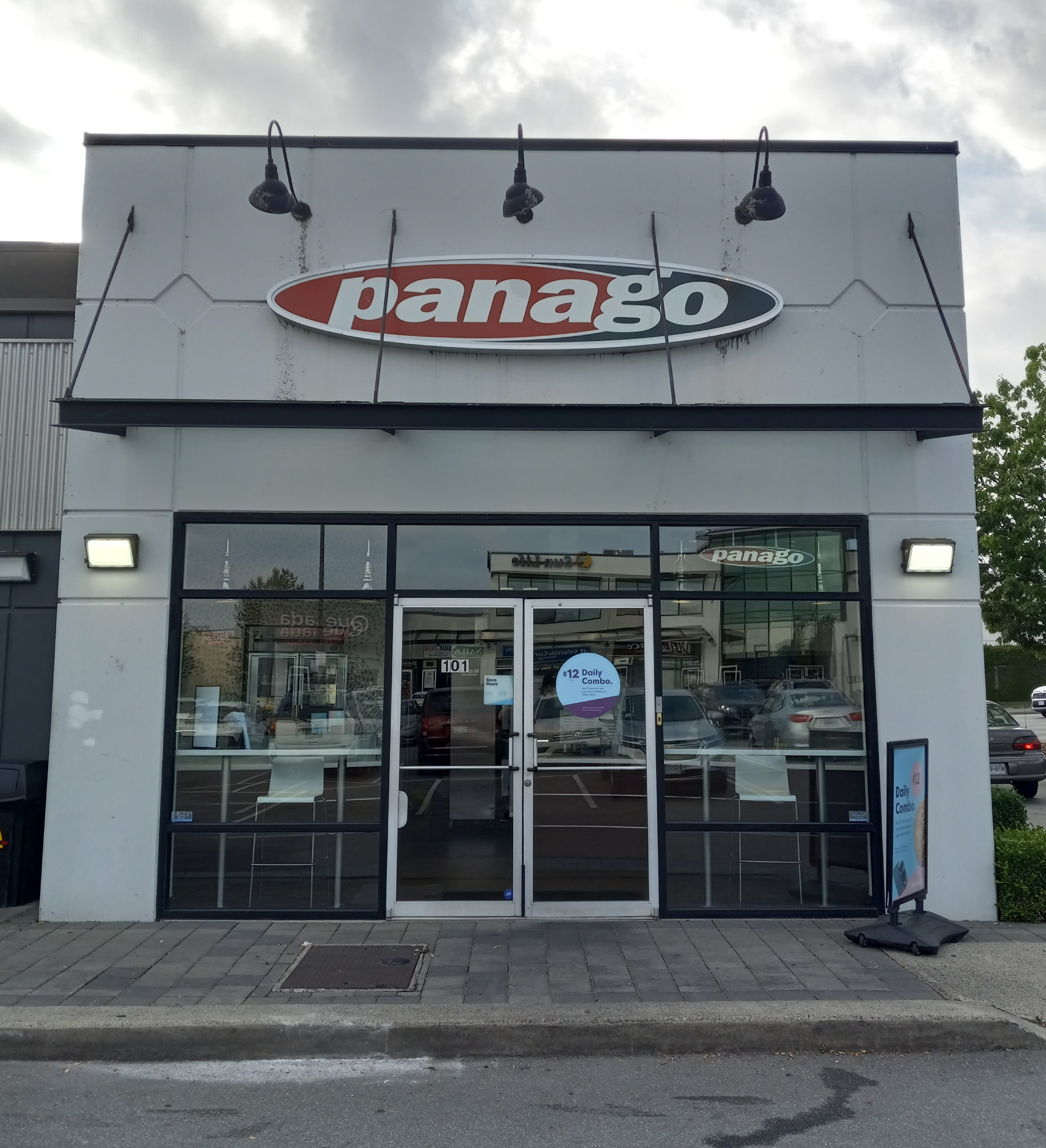
- Storefront in Abbotsford, British Columbia.
- Type: Privately owned, Pizza delivery
- Industry: Quick service
- Founded: 1986; 40 years ago
- Founder: Rooke family
- Headquarters: Abbotsford, British Columbia, Canada
- Products: Pizza, salads, breadsticks, chicken wings
- Website: www.panago.com www.panagofranchise.com

Panago is a privately held Canadian pizza delivery and takeout chain with about 170 locations across 4 provinces. It was founded in 1986 by the Rooke family. Panago is a franchise business with each location being franchisee-owned and operated. In 2015, Panago generated over C$150 million in sales.

== History ==
The first three stores opened in 1986 in Abbotsford, British Columbia, and operated under the brand "Panagopoulos 2 for 1 Pizza Place". The chain's name was soon shortened to "Panagopoulos Pizza Place", then later to "Panagopoulos", and then finally to "Panago" in 2000.

Panago’s head office remains in Abbotsford, while the Ontario regional office (302A - 109 Atlantic Ave) has closed. Additionally, the New Westminster State-of-the-Art Call Centre at 11 - 8th St. (https://www.cutlerdc.com/projects/panago-pizza-call-centre-new-westminster-bc/) terminated its 10-year lease early in October 2025 due to the pandemic's lasting effects.

By late 2006, expansion efforts were heavily focused on the province of Ontario. The first urban Toronto location opened at Bay and Gerrard in April 2007.

A vegan menu was available as of 2023.

== See also ==
- List of Canadian restaurant chains
- List of Canadian pizza chains
