= Michael Overs =

Canadian businessman (1939–2010), founder of Pizza Pizza

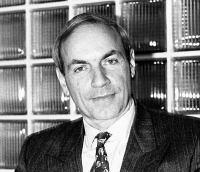
- Born: Michael Andre Overs; June 24, 1939; Toronto, Ontario, Canada
- Died: March 31, 2010 (aged 70); Toronto, Ontario, Canada
- Occupations: Founder and CEO of Pizza Pizza
- Known for: Founding Pizza Pizza
- Spouse: Lilian Overs (his death)
- Children: 5

Michael Arthur Overs (June 24, 1939 – March 31, 2010) was a Canadian businessman who was the founder and CEO of Pizza Pizza, a successful franchise of pizza restaurants.

Overs was born in Toronto in 1939 to Arthur and Edna Overs and grew up in The Beach area and began his business career after dropping out of school at age 17.

Overs began Pizza Pizza from a single store at Parliament and Wellesley on December 31, 1967 and with the unique phone number created a pizza empire.

Pizza Pizza expanded in Toronto from the 1970s to 1980s to other parts in Ontario and then Quebec, he acquired Alberta based Pizza 73 in 2006. He remained CEO until his death at age 70 in Toronto and was succeeded by son-in-law Paul Goddard.
