= Pizza Corner (Halifax) =

Intersection in Halifax, Nova Scotia, Canada

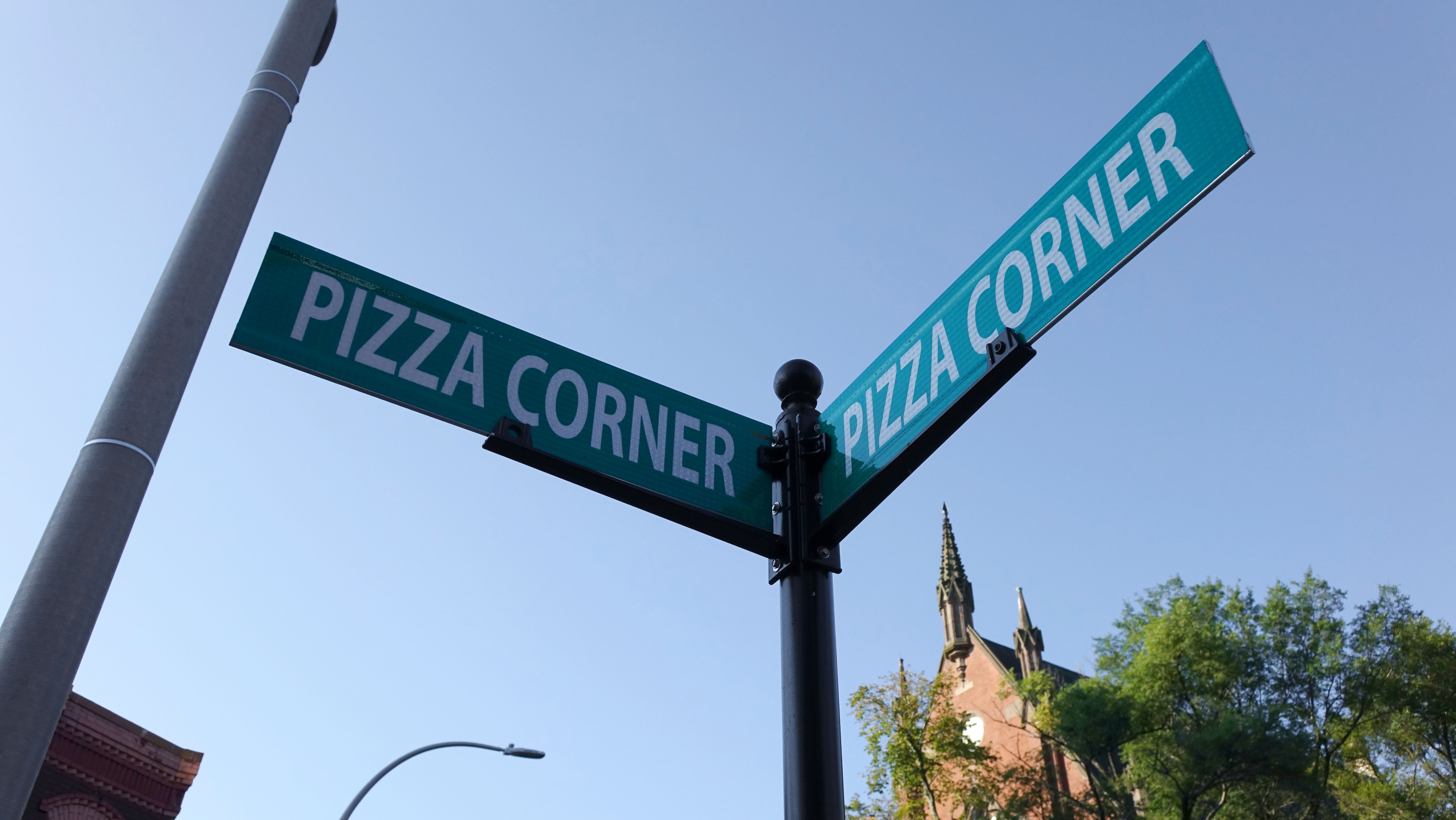
- Pizza Corner in September 2018
- Interactive map of Pizza Corner

Location
- Halifax, Nova Scotia, Canada
- Roads at junction: Blowers Street, Grafton Street

Construction
- Type: Intersection; Restaurant district

Pizza Corner is an intersection in downtown Halifax, Nova Scotia, Canada, at the junction of Blowers Street and Grafton Street. It is a local landmark originally consisting of three pizzerias: King of Donair, Sicilian Pizza and the European Food Shop. Completing the four corners is The Presbyterian Church of Saint David, a provincially recognized heritage building.

All three pizzerias are known for their Halifax-style donairs, and the corner is a popular destination for hungry patrons of the local bars and pubs.

== History ==
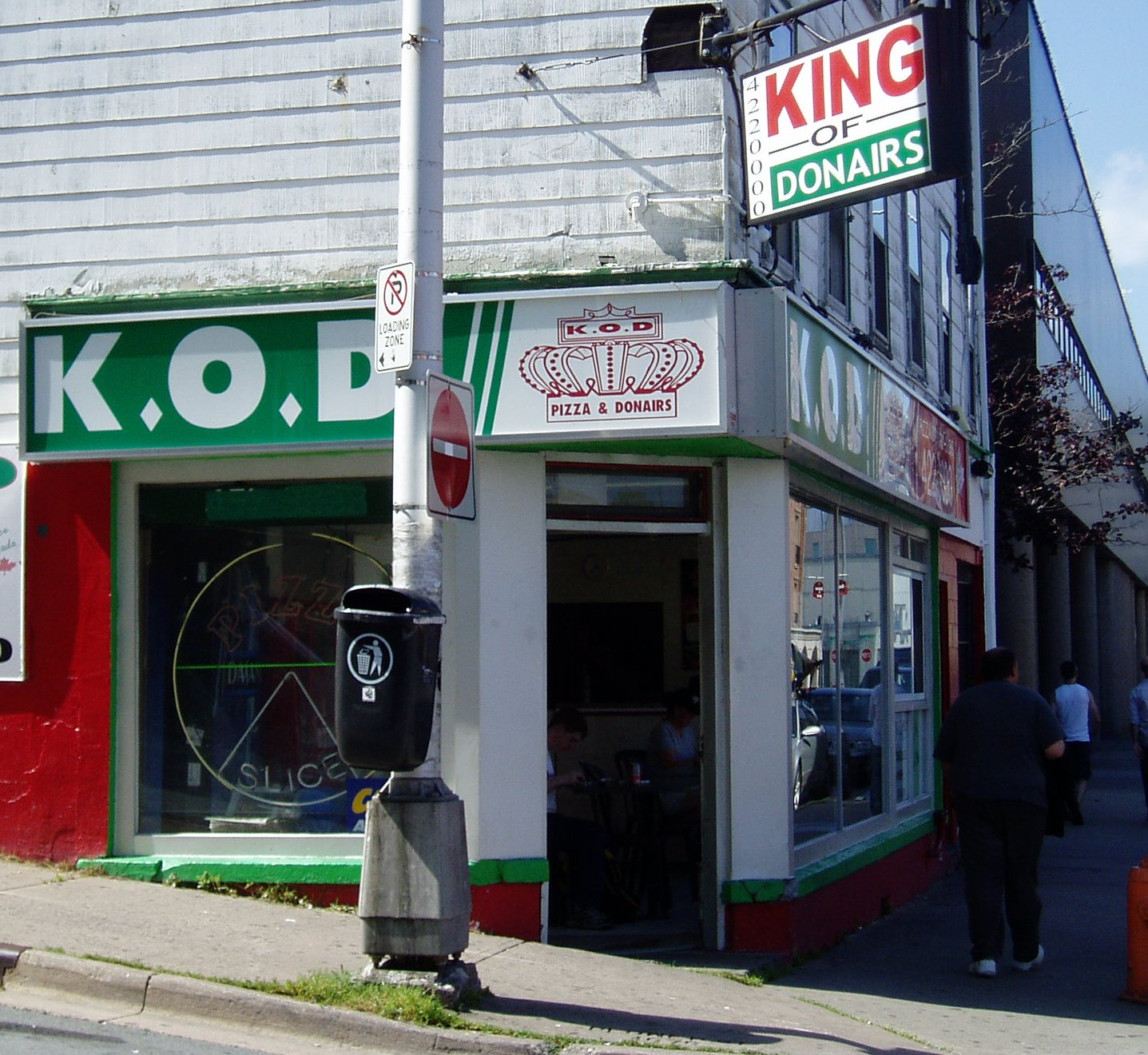
King of Donair at Blowers and Grafton Streets, July 2006

In 1995, when the G7 Summit was held in Halifax several world leaders made a point of visiting the location and buying donairs.

In 2012 King of Donair left their longtime location over a dispute with the building owner, leaving the iconic corner with only two pizzerias. The space was filled for a few years by a frozen yogurt chain, but in 2017 Pizza Girls opened in the former KOD location. The European Food Shop closed in 2015 after operating there since 1987, but the space was not left empty for long as Johnny K's Authentic Donair opened up just a few months later.
