= Pizza Pizza =

Canadian pizza restaurant chain

Pizza Pizza Ltd.

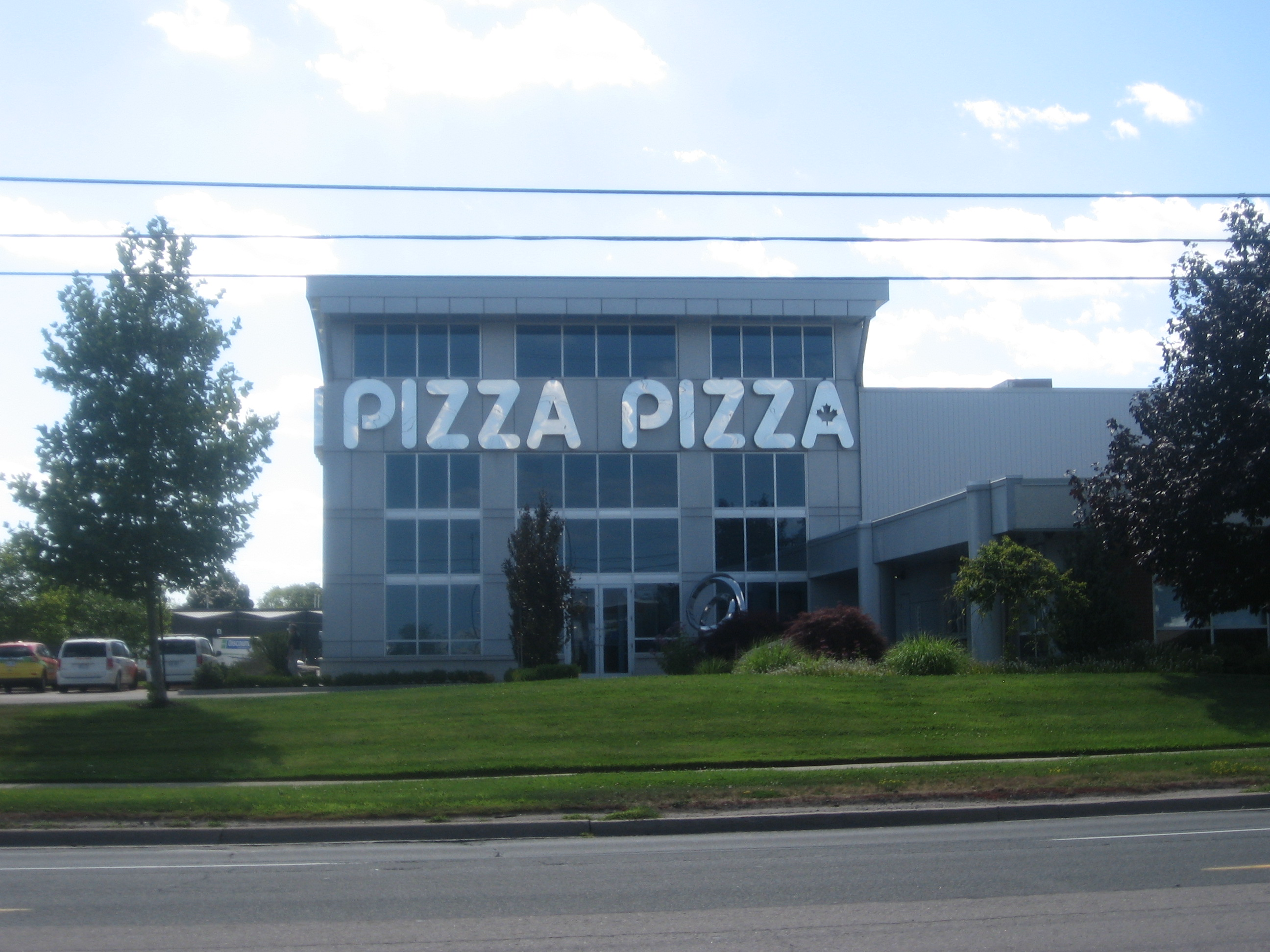
- Corporate headquarters in Toronto
- Type: Private, with publicly traded royalty income fund
- Traded as: TSX: PZA
- Industry: Food delivery; Franchising; Quick Service Restaurants
- Genre: Pizzeria
- Founded: December 31, 1967; 58 years ago
- Founder: Michael Overs
- Headquarters: Toronto, Ontario, Canada
- Area served: Ontario; Quebec; Manitoba; Saskatchewan; Nova Scotia; New Brunswick; Alberta; British Columbia; Yukon; Prince Edward Island
- Key people: Paul Goddard (CEO)
- Products: Pizza; Chicken Wings; Panzerotti; Calzone; Chicken Sandwich; Dessert
- Subsidiaries: Pizza 73
- Website: www.pizzapizza.ca

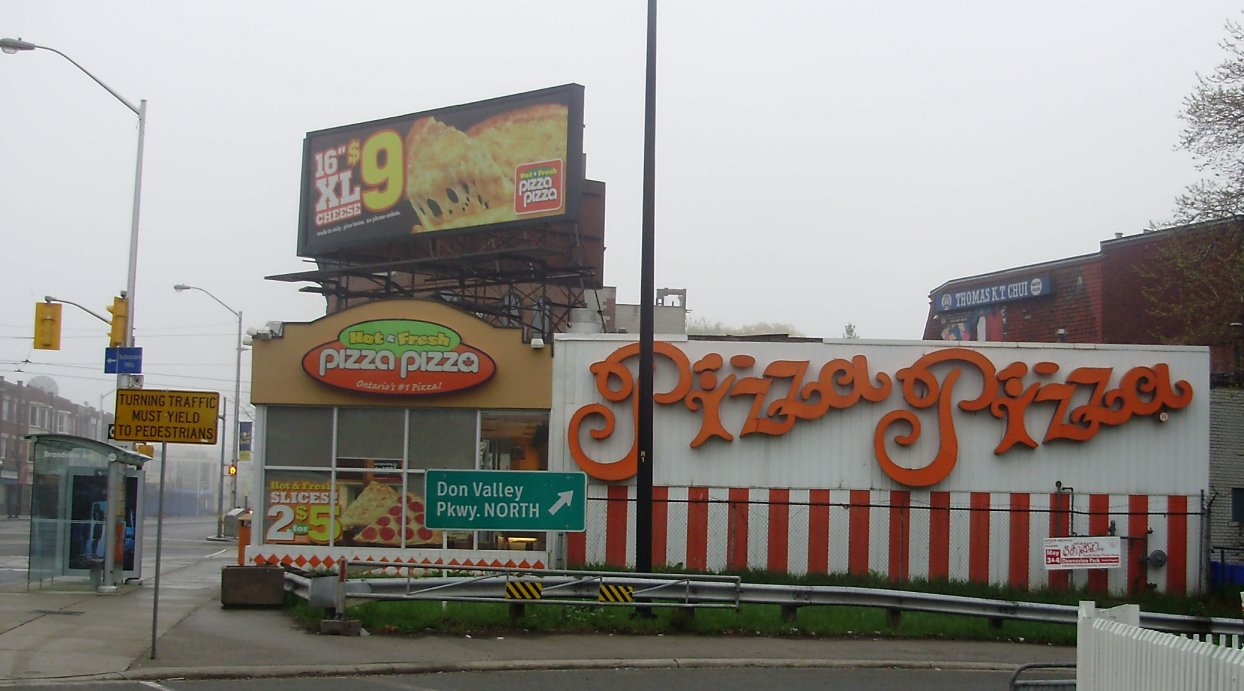
A Pizza Pizza restaurant on Danforth Avenue in Toronto

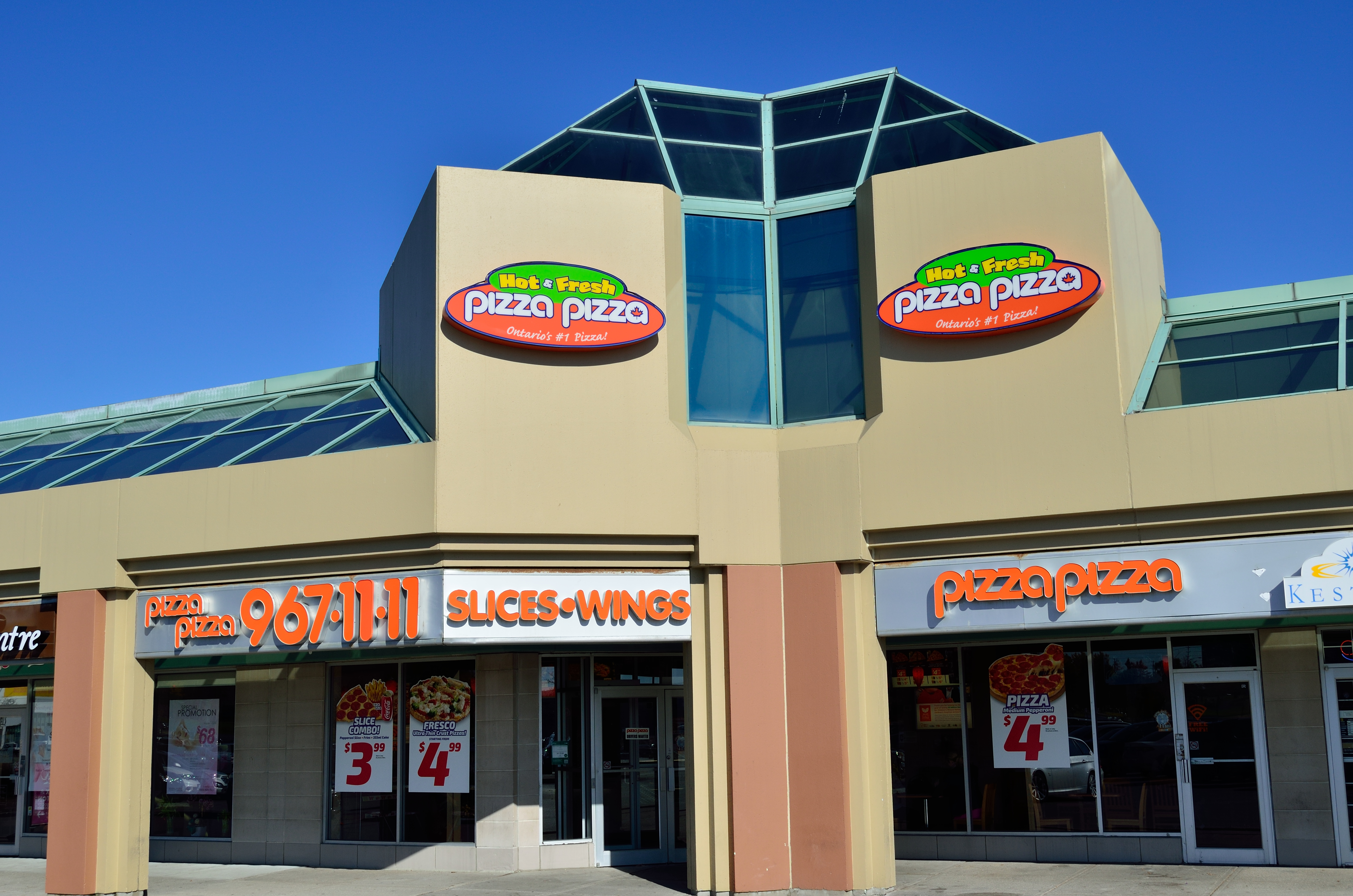
Pizza Pizza in Markham

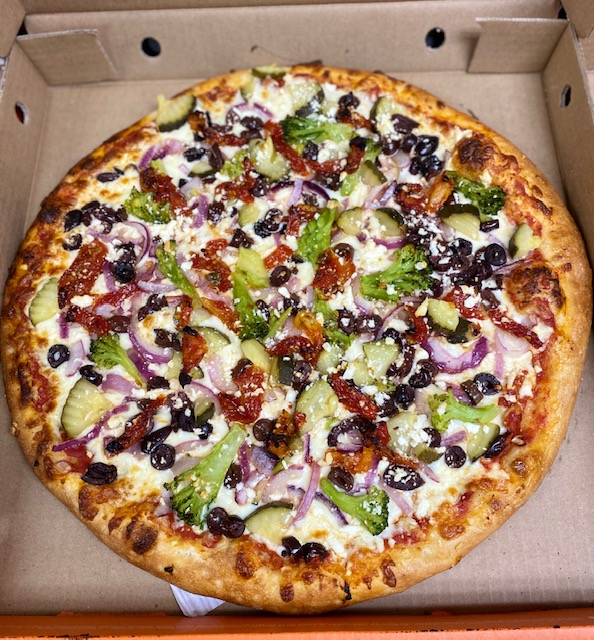
Pizza Pizza's Mediterranean Vegetarian Pizza

Pizza Pizza Ltd. is a franchised Canadian pizza quick-service restaurant with its headquarters in Toronto, Ontario. Its restaurants are mainly in the province of Ontario while others are located in Quebec, Nova Scotia, New Brunswick, Newfoundland and Western Canada. Franchises in western Canada are mostly run through Alberta-based subsidiary Pizza 73. It has over 700 locations, including over 150 non-traditional locations.

== History ==
The chain was founded by Michael Overs, who opened the first location on December 31, 1967, at the corner of Wellesley and Parliament streets in Toronto. He owned the chain until his death in 2010. It expanded throughout the Toronto area in the 1970s, and throughout the rest of Ontario throughout the 1980s and 1990s.

The chain opened its first locations in Quebec in the mid-1980s, but withdrew after a few years. It returned to the province, in Gatineau, in March 2007. Locations were opened in the Montreal area in late 2007 in the boroughs of Notre-Dame-de-Grâce and Pierrefonds-Roxboro.

Pizza Pizza began to expand significantly outside Ontario during the 2000s. In its 2005 initial public offering filings, the chain announced it would consider expansion in western Canada, potentially including purchasing existing local chains. This led to a June 2007 agreement to purchase Alberta-based Pizza 73. As well, in October 2006, the company announced it would expand in the Quebec market, beginning with sponsorship of the Montreal Canadiens. The chain expanded to the British Columbia Lower Mainland in 2009, however all locations closed (Pizza 73 already had a location in Prince George in the B.C. Interior), and soon after added locations in Manitoba and Saskatchewan. The chain returned to Vancouver in 2018. Pizza Pizza opened its first store in Halifax, Nova Scotia, in June 2010. The first New Brunswick location, situated in Dieppe, opened in late 2021. The first Newfoundland location, located in Mount Pearl, opened on December 30, 2024.

Pizza Pizza Limited announced in December 2021 that it was seeking to expand into Mexico.

== Marketing ==
Pizza Pizza is known for the chain's phone number, XXX–1111. The company claims that its early adoption of the centralized single-number ordering system, and its subsequent use and heavy promotion of this rhyming phone number, helped the chain to expand throughout Ontario.

A central local number is used for all locations until it becomes a long-distance call. In other cities, local numbers are requested with the "11-11" suffix to match the standard jingle in the chain's radio advertisements. Pizza Pizza has registered "967–1111" and variants as trademarks.

Unaffiliated American pizza chain Little Caesars does not use its "Pizza! Pizza!" slogan in Canada due to Pizza Pizza's slogan registered as a trademark. Instead, Little Caesars uses slogans such as "Two Pizzas!", "Hot 'N' Ready!", "Delivery! Delivery!", "Quality! Quality!" and others.

== Trademarks ==
Pizza Pizza currently holds the trademarks for:

- Chicken Chicken

== Technology ==
Pizza Pizza won a Webby Award in 2011 for Best Mobile Shopping App.

== See also ==
- List of Canadian restaurant chains
- List of Canadian pizza chains
