= Freshslice Pizza =

Canadian pizza chain and franchise

- Type: Restaurant franchise
- Industry: Fast food
- Founded: 1999; 27 years ago
- Headquarters: 1610 Ingleton Ave, Burnaby, British Columbia, Canada
- Key people: Ray Russell (founder and CEO)
- Products: Pizza Cheesy Bread Chicken Wings FS Cares Brownie
- Website: www.freshslice.com

Freshslice Pizza is a Canadian pizza chain and franchise founded by Ray Russell in 1999. The franchise operates more than 200 locations across Canada. They are known for their pizza by the slice but also sell whole pizzas.

== History ==
Freshslice Pizza was founded in 1999 by Ray Russell in Vancouver, British Columbia. Starting with a single restaurant, Freshslice grew to over 100 Locations across Canada.

== Awards and recognition ==
In 2014 and 2015, Freshslice received a Golden Plate award for Best Pizza By The Slice from the Vancouver-based weekly publication The Georgia Straight.

In 2016, Ray Russell and Freshslice were awarded runner-up for the Entrepreneur of the Year Award through BCBusiness and Ernst & Young (EY) for his involvement at Freshslice.

== Legal issues ==
In 2011, two Freshslice Pizza companies and the owner of two franchise outlets were fined $44,000 for employing illegal workers. Companies owned by Ray Russell and corporate employee Bahman Afshari were all charged by the Canada Border Services Agency after a tip led to the discovery that over a dozen illegal immigrants were employed at Freshslice locations in Vancouver. Afshari was also personally charged.

In 2014 Russell was found guilty by the B.C. Supreme Court of wrongful dismissal of a corporate employee. The courts ordered a judgement of over $40,000 to the former employee.

In 2021, Freshslice filed a lawsuit against multiple former franchisees, who had broken away from the Freshslice chain and rebranded as the new chains HellCrust Pizza and Yummy Slice Pizza; Freshslice accused both companies of utilizing its intellectual property and trade secrets, and of breaching non-compete clauses prohibiting the establishment of competing businesses at the same location, or within five kilometres of an existing Freshslice location, for two years after the transfer or termination of a franchise. Yummy Slice's owner Jaskirat Singh accused Freshslice of having attempted to increase operating costs and devalue his franchises during the COVID-19 pandemic via "new and unnecessary renovations" and mandated promotions that reduced its profit margin, so that Freshslice could buy the franchise below value and resell it at a higher price to a new franchisee. Russell denied the allegations, accused the chains of "selling stolen goods"; the company also issued promotional material deriding the chains and other brands formed by former franchisees as "knockoff brands" that had stolen "the recipes and the proprietary system at our core".

In 2021, The BC Human Rights Tribunal (BCHRT) has ordered the CEO of a major Canadian pizza chain to pay a former employee $85,000 plus interest for creating a "toxic work environment" through "derogatory comments about Muslim and Iranian people. "Tribunal evidence against Ray Russell, CEO of Vancouver-founded Freshslice Pizza, included an audio recording of Russell using a profanity while telling an employee they have “third … world mentalities” that “have no place in Canada.” Russell had argued that any claim of race- and colour-based discrimination could not succeed because Russell shares the same ethnic background, heritage, national origin, first language and culture. They found that Russell's discrimination against Rabiei, the complainant and former marketing manager, was "persistent" and "prolonged," and that he had made discriminatory statements about Muslims for "a period of years."
