= Pizzaiolo (restaurant chain) =

American-style pizza chain in Canada

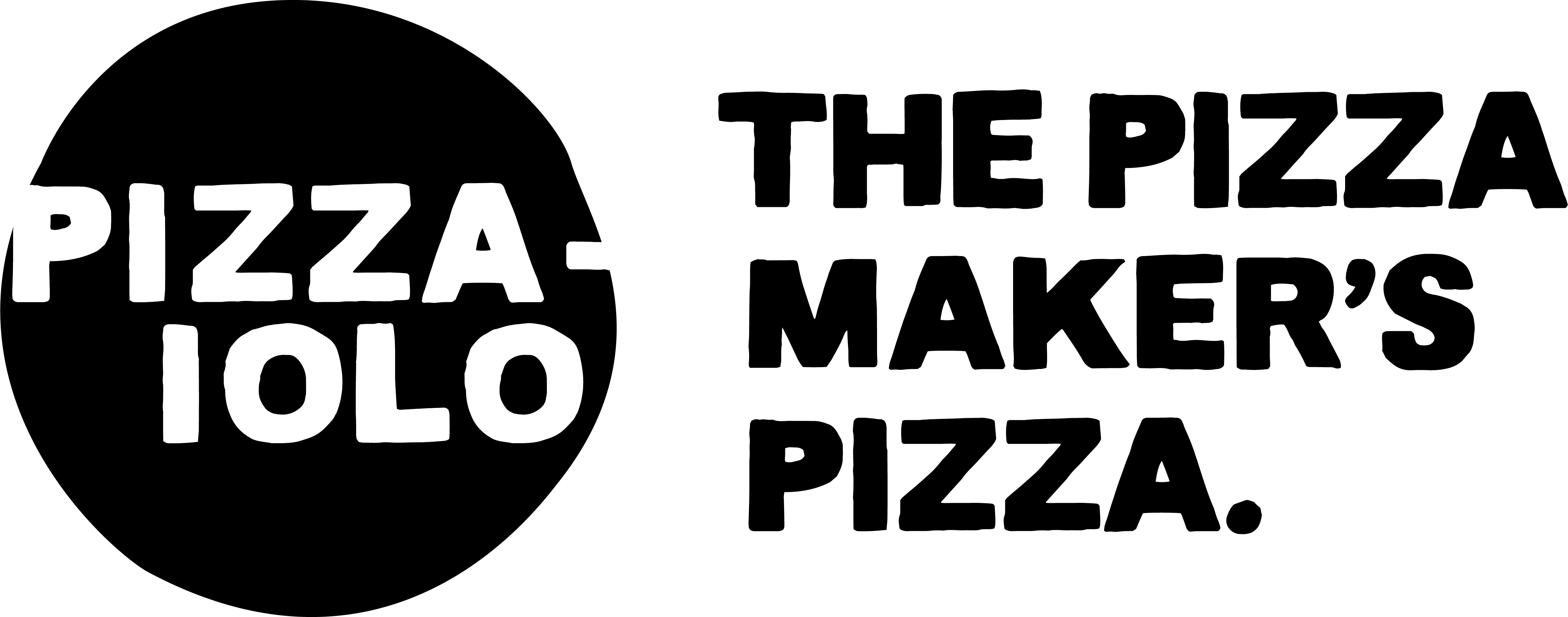

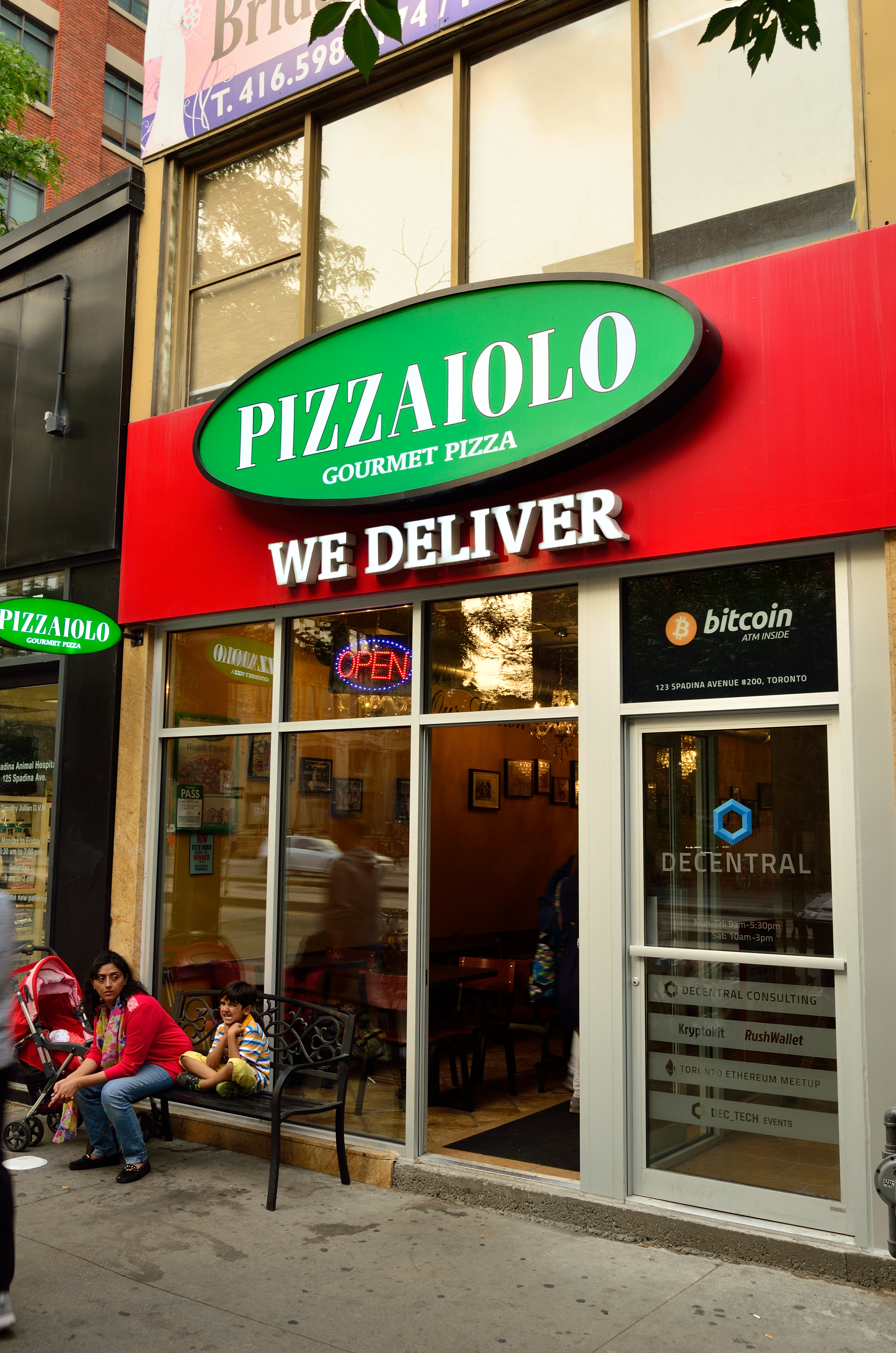
- Pizzaiolo in Toronto, Canada
- Industry: Pizza restaurants
- Founded: 1940s in Montorio nei Frentani, Molise, Italy
- Founders: Nonno Giuseppe; Nonna Ida
- Number of locations: 70
- Area served: Toronto, Canada
- Products: Pizza
- Website: pizzaiolo.ca

Pizzaiolo (Italian: [pittsaˈjɔːlo]; lit. 'pizza maker') is an American-style pizza restaurant chain in Canada. The chain has 43 restaurants in the Greater Toronto Area.

== History ==
Pizzaiolo was founded in the comune (municipality) of Montorio nei Frentani, in Molise, Italy, in the early 1940s by "Nonno (lit. 'grandpa') Giuseppe" and "Nonna (lit. 'grandma') Ida", and was run at a small pizzeria. In the 1960s, the company moved to Toronto where the chain was started by "Mamma Anna" and "Papà Antonio". They opened their first full-fledged restaurant in 1967.

Pizzaiolo currently has 43 locations in the Greater Toronto Area.
