= Pizza 73 =

Canadian pizza restaurant chain, a subsidiary of Pizza Pizza

- Industry: Food delivery; Franchising; Restaurants
- Genre: Pizzeria
- Founded: 1985; 41 years ago
- Founder: David Tougas; Guy Goodwin
- Headquarters: 13703 164 Street NW; Edmonton, Alberta
- Area served: Alberta; Saskatchewan; British Columbia
- Key people: Paul Goddard (CEO)
- Products: Pizza; Chicken wings Pasta; Dairy-Free Cheeze; Gluten Free Dough; Keto Crust
- Parent: Pizza Pizza
- Website: www.pizza73.com

Pizza 73 is a Canadian pizza restaurant chain founded by David Tougas and Guy Goodwin in 1985 and headquartered in Edmonton, Alberta. It was acquired by the Toronto-based Pizza Pizza chain in 2007 for CA$70.2 million.

The restaurant's name originates from its original phone number which repeats the number 73. Pizza 73 was the first delivery chain in Alberta to have a centralized call center, allowing customers to order their meals by phone; Pizza 73 has facilitated orders online since 1995. The restaurant has been recognized as one of Canada's 50 best-managed services, and one of Alberta's 50 fastest-growing companies by Alberta Venture.

In 2019, Pizza 73 added vegan options to its menu.

== Business model ==
Pizza 73 built its chain not using the common franchise model, but by opening new locations as joint ventures with the store operators. The company co-owns the locations and splits the profits with the co-owner, rather than making their money on markup of supplying ingredients and services.
