= Gabriel Pizza =

Canadian pizza restaurant franchise

Restaurant information
- Established: February 28, 1977

Gabriel Pizza is a pizza restaurant franchise located in the Canadian provinces of Ontario, Quebec, and Nova Scotia. The company currently has a total of 39 locations in these provinces. Gabriel Pizza's current president and CEO is George Hanna.

== History ==
Gabriel Pizza was founded in Orleans, Ontario by Michael Hanna on February 28, 1977. A call centre was established in 2008 due to the growing call demand, and an app providing loyalty rewards was launched in 2020. Located primarily in Canada's Capital, Gabriel Pizza currently owns and franchises stores in the communities of Ottawa, Brockville, Kingston, Kanata, Stittsville, Embrun, Rockland, Kemptville, and Picton. There are also 5 franchises in Quebec in the communities of Aylmer, Gatineau, Hull and Buckingham and 1 franchise in Antigonish, Nova Scotia which opened in 2023. Gabriel Pizza operates both quick service delivery locations and traditional casual restaurants.

== See also ==
- List of Canadian pizza chains
