= Volcano Pizzeria =

- Interactive map of Volcano Pizzeria

Restaurant information
- Established: 1957
- Closed: 1986
- Location: 157 Wyandotte Street West, Windsor, Canada
- Coordinates: 42.313403°N 83.038231°W

Volcano Pizzeria, also known as Volcano Restaurant, was a pizzeria operating in Windsor, Ontario, from 1957 until it was sold to the Downtown Mission Centre in 1986. It was one of Windsor's best-known pizzerias and is the likely originator of Windsor-style pizza, with other pizzerias in Windsor having credited Volcano for their recipes.

== History ==
The restaurant was founded in 1957 by cousins Frank Gualtieri and Gino Manza. The Gualtieri family states the restaurant was named after the volcano Mount Vesuvius located near Naples, a known pizza city. According to the Windsor Star, Manza originally learned how to cook in Boston, and modified the recipe he learned there for Volcano. Gualteri's family states he learned how to make pizza dough from his cousin's pizzeria in Detroit. They also noted Volcano was originally a diner serving Italian food but later became a pizzeria instead, either in 1957 or the early 1960s. When it opened, the restaurant could seat up to 60 guests and was the first Italian restaurant in downtown Windsor.

The restaurant was likely the first to use cornmeal in their crust, shred their pepperoni, and top their pizzas with canned mushrooms, which would become hallmarks of Windsor-style pizza. They used canned mushrooms because they did not burn in their ovens and shredded pepperoni as it was easier to top. As a result, Volcano has been called the "granddaddy" of the style, and most other pizzerias in Windsor can trace their recipes to the original Volcano recipe, with some confirming it. Volcano was the first pizzeria in Windsor offering delivery by a fleet of Jeeps and Volkswagen Beetles. The restaurant expanded in the early 1960s with new four-deck pizza ovens and an expanded seat capacity for 400 guests.

In 1985, a Windsor Star article noted that business at Volcano had declined in recent years. Gino Manza sold the location to the Downtown Mission Centre in 1986, permanently closing the restaurant. In 2016, a Gualtieri family member shared the original recipe in a CBC article.
