= Donair =

Version of a doner kebab from Halifax, Nova Scotia

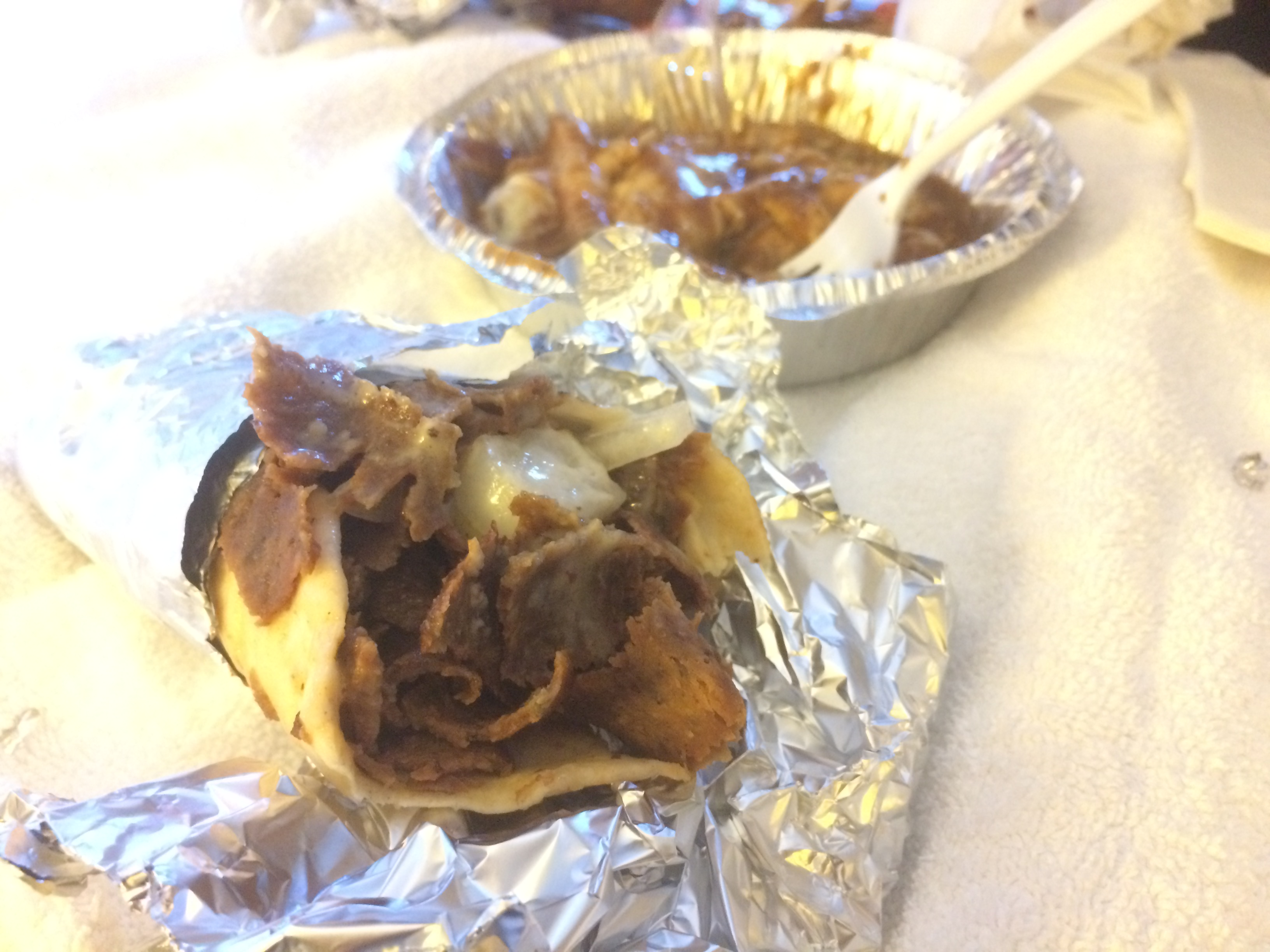
- Donair and poutine from the chain King of Donair
- Course: Snack or main course
- Place of origin: Canada
- Region or state: Bedford, Nova Scotia
- Created by: Peter Gamoulakos
- Serving temperature: Hot
- Main ingredients: Beef
- Variations: Donair pizza, donair poutine, donair eggroll

The donair is a variation of the doner kebab that originated in Halifax, Nova Scotia, Canada, in the early 1970s. Donair meat is made from spiced ground beef sliced off a rotating cone, and then fried on a flattop to ensure doneness and create crispy edges. The toppings typically include chopped onions and tomatoes, while the distinctive sweet donair sauce is made from condensed milk (or evaporated), sugar, vinegar, and garlic powder. All of these ingredients are wrapped together in a soft white Lebanese style pita.

== History ==
Originating from traditional Turkish döner, the Halifax donair was created in the 1970s by Greek immigrant Peter Gamoulakos. Initially offering traditional gyros at Velos Pizza in Bedford, Nova Scotia, Gamoulakos modified the recipe to better suit local tastes. He replaced lamb with beef and developed a sweet sauce made from evaporated milk, vinegar, and garlic powder.

== Development ==
Donairs trace their origins to the Turkish dish döner kebab, which dates back to the Ottoman period. Related variations later developed in other regions, including gyros in Greece and shawarma in the Middle East.

The modern fast-food style döner sandwich emerged in Berlin in the early 1970s, developed by Turkish immigrants adapting traditional döner to urban street-food culture. Velos Pizza in Bedford, Nova Scotia, is credited with creating the "Halifax" donair around 1971–1973, featuring a very sweet sauce made from condensed milk, sugar, garlic, and vinegar.

In 1973, Gamoulakos opened the King of Donair restaurant on Quinpool Road in Halifax, where the donair recipe was developed further. The dish quickly gained popularity, becoming a staple of late-night dining. The classic donair consists of spiced ground beef cooked on a rotating spit, served in a pita with tomatoes, onions, and the signature sweet sauce.

== Expansion and recognition ==
Throughout the 1990s and 2000s, the donair continued to grow in popularity. In 2015, Halifax officially recognized the donair as the city's official food. The motion, which saw an equal split among councillors, was decided by Mayor Mike Savage, who cast the deciding vote to elevate the donair to its official status.

== Cultural influence ==
The donair's influence extends beyond Halifax, with its presence in other Canadian cities and endorsements from notable figures like Anthony Bourdain.

== Regional variations and current status ==
The Halifax donair has inspired numerous regional variations across Canada. In New Brunswick, donairs include lettuce, while in Alberta, variations include cheese and pepperoni. Despite these adaptations, the authentic donair remains a Nova Scotian specialty, and its popularity continues to grow. Today, Tony's Meats, which acquired the Mr. Donair brand, continues to expand its reach, offering a range of donair-related products across Canada and recently into the U.S.

=== Edmonton ===
Edmonton has embraced the donair, with nearly 120 shops featuring donairs in their names. The city's Lebanese community played a significant role in popularizing donairs in Edmonton. Notable establishments like Athena Donair contributed to its local fame. Unlike Halifax, Edmonton donairs often include variations like lettuce, tzatziki sauce, and unique flavors such as barbecue and pineapple curry. In 2024, Prime Time Donair made headlines by winning an auction for a donair costume, paying $16,025 to keep the Alberta-made costume within the province.

== See also ==
- Canadian cuisine
- List of Canadian inventions and discoveries
