= Garlic fingers =

Flatbread popular in Atlantic Canada

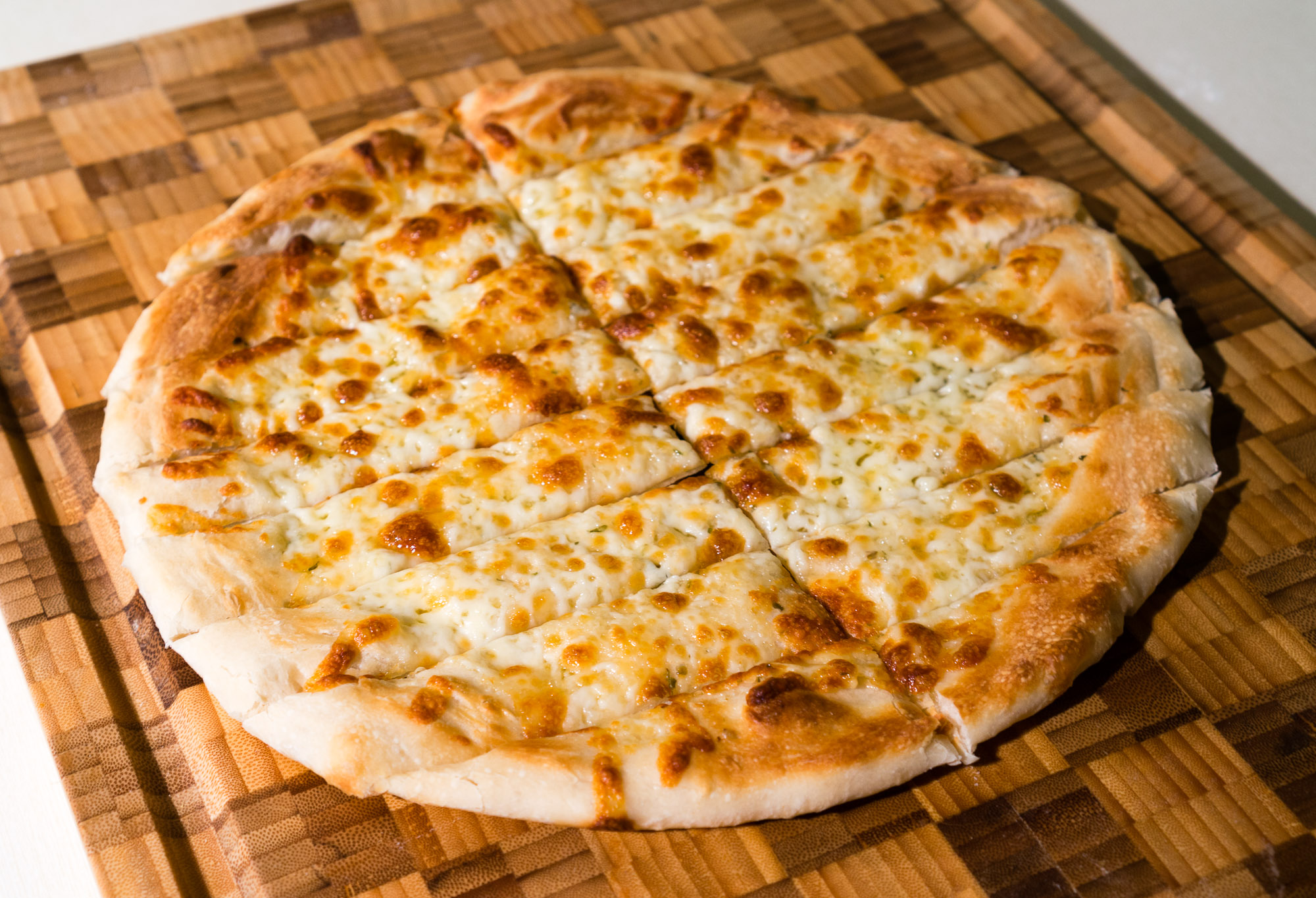
- Type: Pizza
- Place of origin: Canada
- Region or state: Atlantic Canada
- Main ingredients: Pizza dough, garlic butter, parsley, cheese, bacon

Garlic fingers (French: Doigts à l'ail), also known as garlic cheese fingers or garlies, are an Atlantic Canadian dish, similar to a pizza in shape and size and made with the same type of dough. Instead of being cut in triangular slices, they are presented in thin strips, or "fingers".

Instead of the traditional tomato sauce and toppings of a pizza, garlic fingers consist of pizza dough topped with garlic butter, parsley, and cheese, which is cooked until the cheese is melted. Bacon bits are also sometimes added.

Garlic fingers are often eaten as a side dish with pizza, and dipped in donair sauce.

== Wisconsin-style cheese fries ==
In central Wisconsin and some other parts of the state, a similar dish is served, consisting of a pizza-like, typically thin crust topped with cheese and garlic butter or a garlic-butter-like mixture. It is cut into strips and often accompanied with marinara sauce. Called cheese fries and sometimes pizza fries or Italian fries, they are sold both in restaurants and in the frozen foods section of supermarkets.

== See also ==
- List of Canadian inventions and discoveries
- Canadian cuisine
- Acadian cuisine
- List of garlic dishes
