= List of pizza chains =

This list of pizza chains includes notable pizzerias and pizza chain restaurants.

== International chains ==
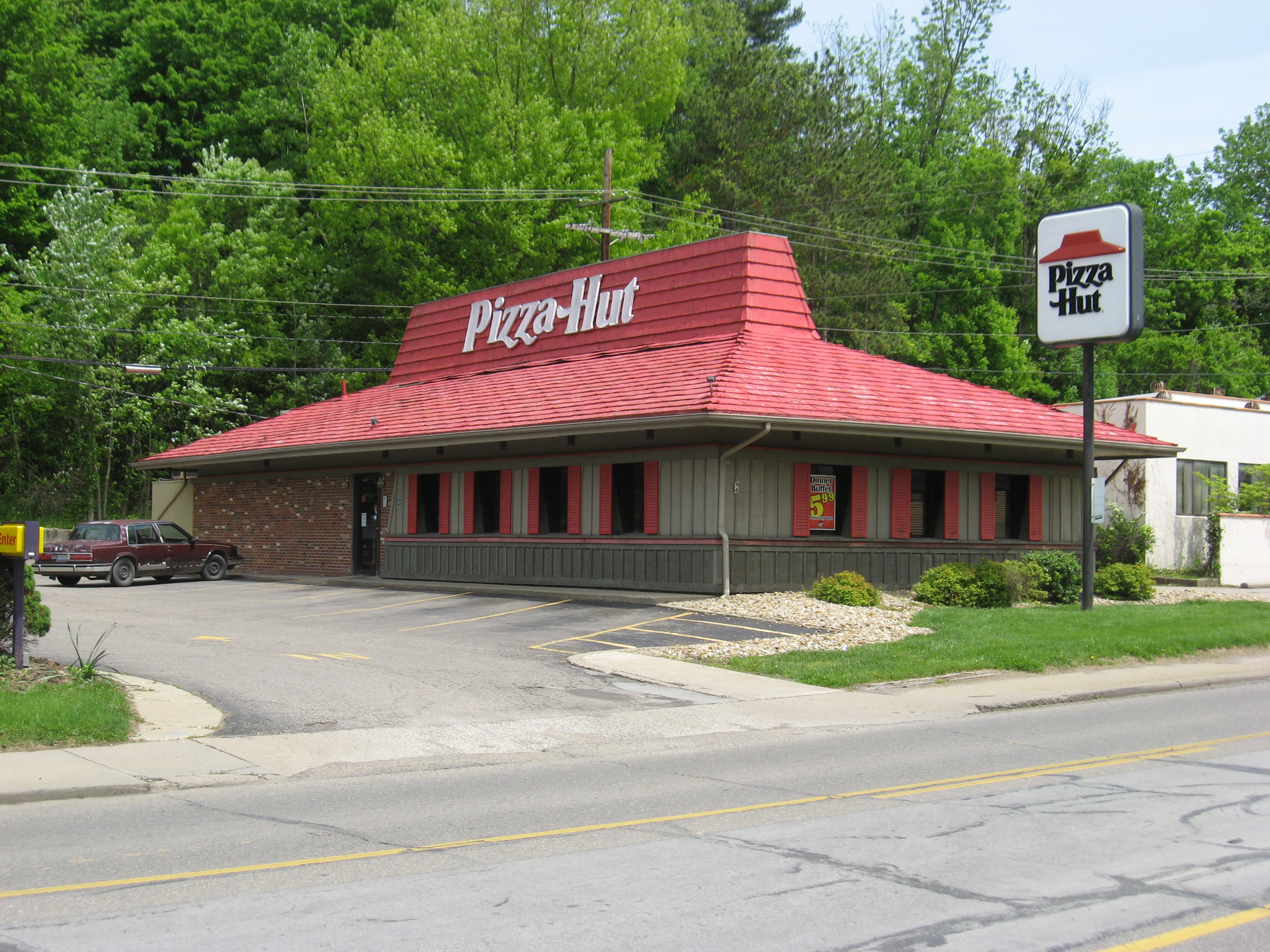
Pizza Hut

=== US-based ===
see also article: List of pizza chains of the United States

- Blaze Pizza
- Buddy's Pizza
- California Pizza Kitchen
- Chuck E. Cheese
- Domino's Pizza
- Hungry Howie's
- Jet's Pizza
- Little Caesars
- Monical's Pizza
- Papa John's Pizza
- Pizza Hut
- Pizza Inn
- Round Table Pizza
- Sbarro
- Sexy Pizza
- Shakey's Pizza
- Snappy Tomato Pizza
- Uno Pizzeria & Grill

=== Canada, Europe, and Asia ===
- Boston Pizza
- Dodo Pizza
- Figaro's Pizza
- Maestro Pizza
- PizzaExpress
- Pizza Corner (now owned by Papa John's)
- Pizza Nova
- Pizza Pizza
- Sarpino's Pizzeria
- Telepizza
- The Pizza Company
- Vapiano
- Yellow Cab Pizza

== Pizzerias by country of origin ==
=== Australia ===
- Pizza Capers
- La Porchetta

=== Brazil ===
- Mister Pizza

=== Bulgaria ===
- Pizza Lab

=== Canada ===
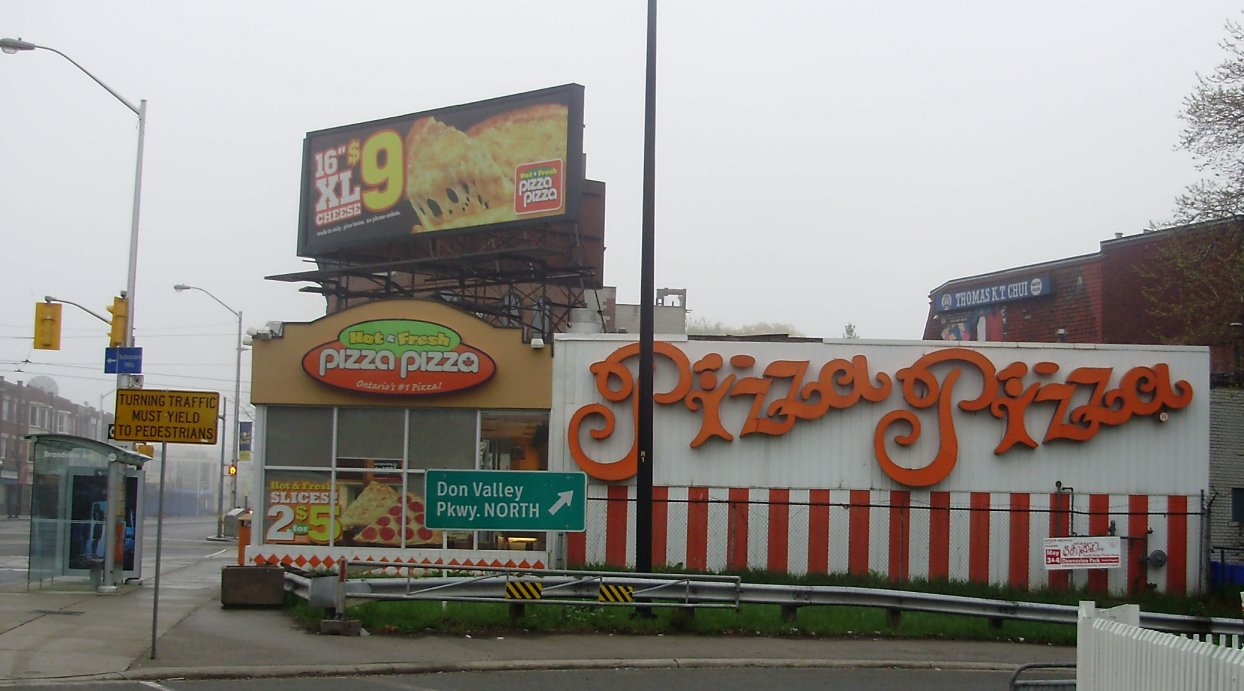
A Pizza Pizza restaurant on Danforth Avenue in Toronto

- 241 Pizza
- Boston Pizza
- Freshslice Pizza
- Gabriel Pizza
- Greco Pizza Restaurant
- King of Donair
- Mikes
- Mother's Pizza
- Panago
- Pizza 73
- Pizza Delight
- Pizza Nova
- Pizzaiolo
- Pizza Pizza
- Pizza Salvatore
- Topper's Pizza

=== China ===
- Kro's Nest
- Origus

=== Colombia ===
- Jeno's Pizza

=== Finland ===
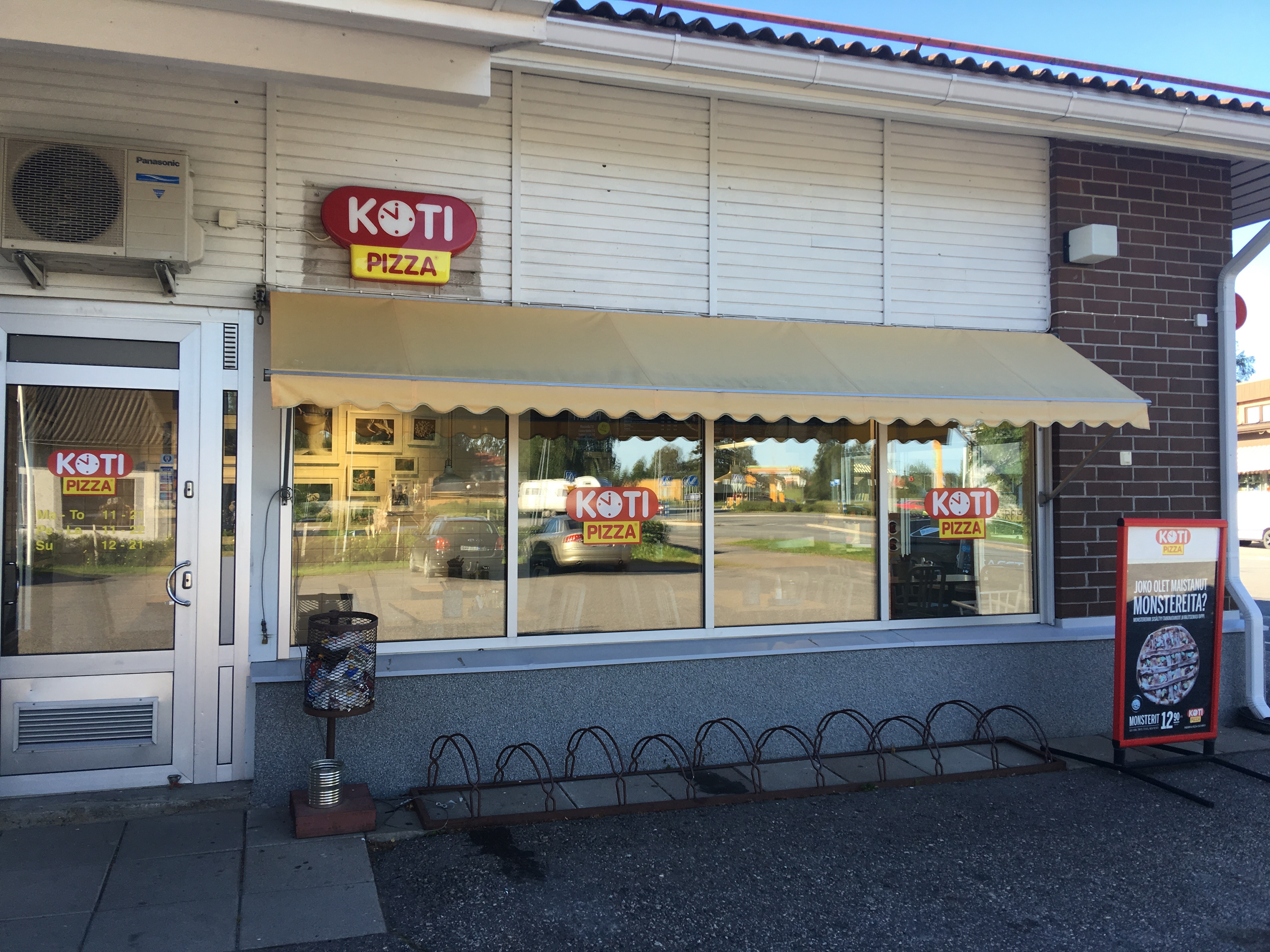
A Kotipizza restaurant in Kauhava, Finland

- Kotipizza

=== France ===
- Speed Rabbit Pizza

=== Germany ===
- Vapiano

=== India ===
- Smokin' Joe's

=== Ireland ===
- Four Star Pizza
- Apache Pizza

=== Israel ===
- Big Apple Pizza

=== Italy ===
- Rossopomodoro
- Spizzico

=== Japan ===
- Aoki's Pizza
- Pizza California
- Pizza-La

=== Lithuania ===
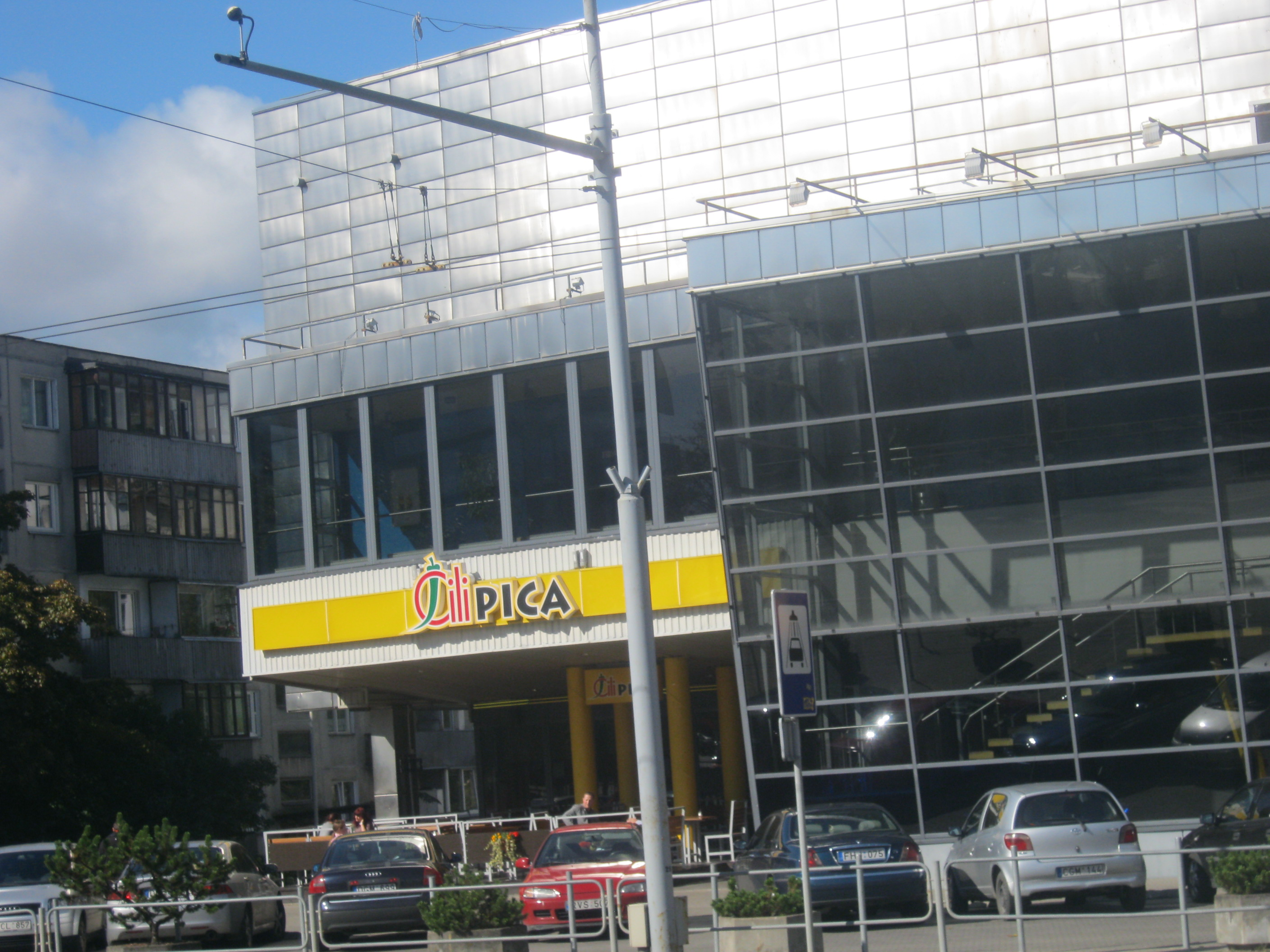
A Čili Pica restaurant in Vilnius, Lithuania

- Čili

=== Mexico ===
- Benedetti's Pizza

=== Netherlands ===
- New York Pizza

=== New Zealand ===
- Hell Pizza

=== Norway ===
- Peppes Pizza

=== Philippines ===
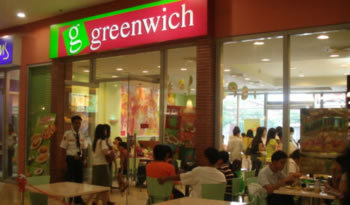
A Greenwich Pizza restaurant in the Philippines

- Greenwich Pizza
- Yellow Cab Pizza

=== Russia ===
- Dodo Pizza
- New York Pizza

=== Saudi Arabia ===
- Maestro Pizza

=== South Africa ===
- Debonairs Pizza
- Panarottis
- Roman's Pizza

=== South Korea ===
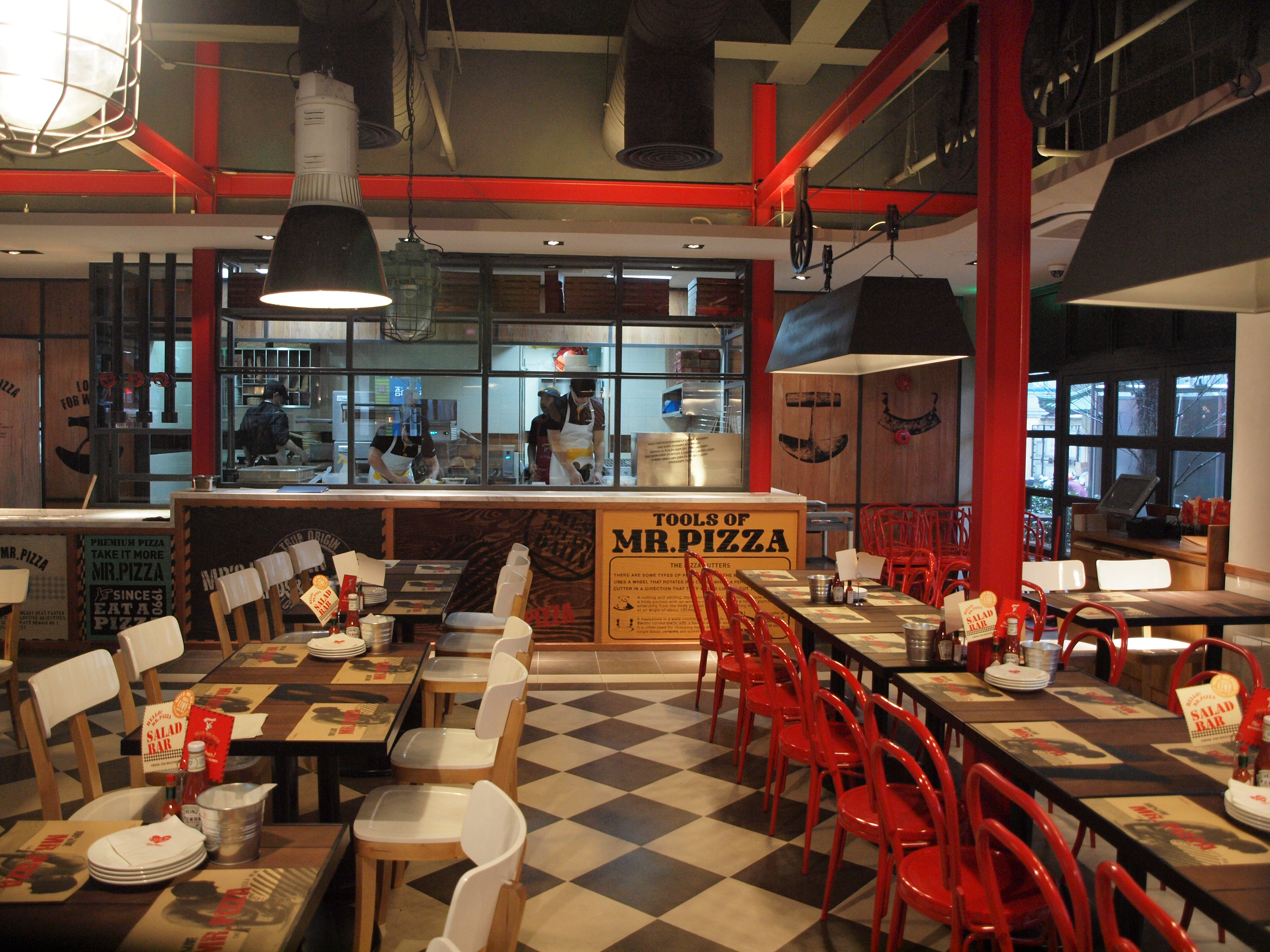
Interior of a Mr. Pizza restaurant in Shanghai

- Mr. Pizza

=== Spain ===
- Telepizza

=== Taiwan ===
- Alleycat's Pizza
- Napoli Pizza and Fried Chicken

=== Thailand ===
- The Pizza Company

=== Trinidad and Tobago ===
- Mario's Pizzeria

=== Ukraine ===
- Pizza Celentano

=== United Kingdom ===
- easyPizza (defunct)
- Fireaway Pizza
- Franco Manca
- PizzaExpress

=== Vietnam ===
- Pizza 4P's

== See also ==
- List of pizza franchises
- List of casual dining restaurant chains
- List of coffeehouse chains
- List of fast food restaurant chains
- List of ice cream parlor chains
- Lists of restaurants
