= Pizza Lab =

Pizza Lab may refer to:

- Pizza Lab (restaurant chain), a pizza chain headquartered in Sofia, Bulgaria
- Pizza Lab (Leipzig restaurant), a vegan restaurant in Leipzig, Germany
