= Plantado =

Plantados were political prisoners of the communist party of Cuba under Fidel Castro. Plantados were the most uncooperative of Cuba's political prisoners, and thus endured the harshest punishment. In 1961, the Cuban penal system introduced a progressive rehabilitation program. Prisoners who participated willingly attended political education classes and performed manual labor. They were generally treated better, allowed more visits and released sooner. Those who refused were called "plantados" - the immovable ones. They rebelled against forced-labor, working as slow as possible. Some died from the beatings they were given. Later, when regular prisoners were given blue prison uniforms, the plantados were left with only their underwear. For many years, Castro refused to free plantados who had once been his allies.

As early as 1964, the Castro regime in Cuba implemented at the Isla de Pinos prison an abusive and Draconian forced labor policy popularly known as the “Plan de Trabajo Forzado, Camilo Cienfuegos” (FORCED LABOR PLAN TITLED CAMILO CIENFUEGOS). All prisoners, driven by the sharp bayonets of the guards, were compelled to engage in this forced labor. Refusing to do so would result in a shower of savage beatings sometimes culminating in the offending inmate being shot. At this time there were between 7,000 to 10,000 political prisoners in Cuba. Three inmates among this multitude dared to challenge Castro’s forced labor policy. The first individual was a journalist, Alfredo Izaguirre Riva, followed by the lawyer Emilio Adolfo Rivero Caro, and finally joined by Onirio Nerin Sanchez Infante, ex-captain of Castro’s Rebel Army and leader of the guerrillas who fought in the mountains of El Escambray.

The first three "Plantados" were Alfredo Izaguirre Riva, Emilio Rivero Caro and Nerín Sánchez Infante(1964). A year later(since 1965–1967), they were followed by 21 more Plantados: Jose Varona Primelles(Pepin), Odilio Alonso, Eriberto Bacallao, Gregorio Ariosa Rubio, Ernesto Toledo Lopez, Carlos Moreno Pacheco, Ricardo Vázquez Pérez, Israel Abreu Villareal, Pedro Luis Boitel Abraham (died on a hunger strike), Servando Infante, Enrique Garcia Cuevas, Ramon Lezcano, Jose Piloto Mora, Armando Almanza, Antonio Vigo Cancio, Rigoberto Lopez Chavez, Ricardo Rangel Mendoza, Julio Reyes Suárez (who went insane from punishment), Antonio Rodríguez Galano, Juan Pérez Báez, and Roberto Pavón Pena.

It was these three idealists who gave birth to the concept of the term Plantado.(Alfredo Izaguirre Riva, Emilio Adolfo Rivero Caro, and Onirio Nerin Sanchez Infante).

As the inmates held at the Isla de Pino prison were dispersed to other facilities on the island,(1967), the word spread. Many who had slowed down the forced labor or had somehow defied the prison system found in the depths of their conscience that the time had come to boldly confront the tyranny of the regime. Thousands of prisoners joined the Plantados swelling the ranks of the resistance. Not only did they refuse the forced labor, they also refused to wear the blue prison uniforms which identified them as common criminals. Like a badge of honor they would wear the beige uniforms of political prisoners or wear nothing at all. In the 1980s, a new group of prisoners said they had become the new plantados.

The history of Castro's prisons is being told in the eponymous movie Plantados, which is being filmed in the City of Miami South Florida by Cuban director and screenwriter Lilo Vilaplana. The debut of the film is planned for March 2021. Plantados has a million-dollar budget provided by Leopoldo Fernández Pujals, to honor the memory of Cuban political prisoners and, in particular, his uncle, José Pujals Mederos, who served 27 years of a 30-year sentence imposed by the Castro government.

The history of the plantados has been recorded on the page www.losplantados.com for more than 30 years. The website includes the following historical data: names of thousands of plantados during the year 1977, name of political prisoners with prisoners #, those murdered, hunger strikes, the letter of the 138, and more. This historical data was taken from prison during 7 years by one of the messengers of the plantados, Miguel Sanchez, son of the third plantado prisoner who refused to work by force, Nerin Sanchez. Miguel, directs the non-profit organization “Proyecto Los Plantados, Inc.” (Plantados Project). He is the founder and president of “Proyecto los Plantados, Inc.,” a Historical Chronicle of Cuban political prisoners, those executed by firing squads, killed in combat and those who became plantados. At a very young age Sanchez became the courier or messenger for the plantados, smuggling their correspondence to their families and other prisons. From age 12 to 19 he was the exclusive secret messenger for Commander Huber Matos, He was the first one to link the various Cuban prisons to Matos's organization, later to be known as Cuba Independent and Democratic(C.I.D.). At tremendous personal risk, Miguel Sanchez continued this perilous task, smuggling out a portion of Huber Matos book Como Llego la Noche, the first book by Armando Valladares, Desde mi Silla de Ruedas, Los Plantados authored by his father Nerin Sanchez, Jardin de Heroes by Eduardo de Juan, as well as a detailed list compiled by Raul Perez Coloma, documenting the names, prisoner ID, charges and sentences of thousands of political prisoners both men and women, incarcerated in Castro‘s prisons. In this manner Miguel Sanchez helped to expose to the world the truth hidden behind the walls of Castro‘s prisons.

== Notable plantados ==
Alfredo A. Izaguirre Riva was born October 11, 1938. He was the youngest journalist of the newspaper El Crisol in Havana, Cuba. At 18 years of age, he was the youngest member of the "Sociedad Interamericana de Prensa" (Interamerican Society of the Press). He fought against the Castro dictatorship by joining the United States Central Intelligence Agency (CIA) as an agent. His work at the agency consisted of organizing the plan "Patty" which entailed a military attack against the U.S. Naval base in Guantanamo, Cuba giving the United States a reason to invade Cuba and remove Fidel Castro. Days before the execution of the organized attack, one other of the organizers confessed to Cuban authorities of the plan. Alfredo A. Izaguirre Riva was sentenced to death for organizing the plan and his role with the CIA. The Castro regime made a movie titled “Patty Candela” depicting the plan and his involvement with the CIA. He was the first Cuban political prisoner who refused to work while incarcerated under the Castro regime. The defiant act of refusing to work later became known as “Plantado.” He was the first Plantado and the only one who never worked. As a result of not working and his strong and defiant position against the communist regime, he was beaten and tortured for years in solitary punishment cells. He was incarcerated for 18 years. As a result of almost two decades of torture and being beaten to the brink of death, he suffered a brain hemorrhage shortly after being released from prison after immigrating to Miami, Florida. He was paralyzed for 30 years until his death on May 30, 2014.

Mario Chanes de Armas was the last plantado to be released, in 1991, after 30 years of incarceration. He was originally among Castro's closest allies, participating in the attack on the Moncada barracks. He turned against Castro early in the revolution.

Eusebio Peñalver Mazorra was the longest held plantado in Cuba, imprisoned for 28 years. He was one of many who participated in the peasant-based Escambray resistance.

Armando Valladares wrote an autobiographical account of his time as a plantado, Against All Hope: A Memoir of Life in Castro's Gulag.

Nerín Sánchez Infante was a captain of the Castro Revolutionary Forces and anti-Castro guerrilla leader. He was imprisoned for 19 years by the Castro regime as one of three original plantados. He was the founder and commanding general of the Secret organization "Ejército Rebelde Juramentado", ('Los Juramentados"), an anti-Castro secret rebel army organized during imprisonment (for which he was sentenced to twelve additional years), also known as O.R.A.C. (Organización Revolucionaria Anti Comunista). He wrote the first book about Plantados: Los Plantados.
