= Kuapay =

Payment service provider

- Type: Private
- Industry: Mobile payments
- Founder: Joaquín Ayuso de Pául
- Headquarters: Santa Monica, California, United States
- Area served: Santa Monica, California; New York City; Santiago; Chile; Madrid, Spain

Kuapay is a defunct Santa Monica, California-based payment service provider that combined a digital wallet and mobile payments. The company developed one of the first foreign third-party payment apps to go live in China, and was reportedly the official mobile payments provider in Chile.

== History ==
The company was founded by Joaquín Ayuso de Pául, who previously created and sold Tuenti, a Spanish social networking site.

Kuapay's seed round collected $900,000, launching in 2011. The company received a $4 million investment in 2012 from a single funder.

By 2013, Kuapay was used by over 600 merchants in the United States.

== Availability ==
Kuapay was available both in the U.S. and internationally with significant merchant adoption in Santa Monica, California, New York City, Chile, Spain, Colombia, Panama, and the United Kingdom, with trials including franchises such as KFC, and Telepizza.

== Functionality ==
The Kuapay system allowed consumers to present a one-time QR code to a merchant, authorize a purchase, and receive a receipt. Credit card information was not transmitted in the QR code, increasing safety. The system also included location-based coupons and loyalty marketing. This one-time mechanism increased security over presenting a credit card number.

== Offices ==
The company was based in Santa Monica, California with offices in New York City, Santiago, Chile, and Madrid, Spain.
