= Pot Luck (web series) =

Lesbian web series from New Zealand

- Genre: Dramedy (drama comedy)
- Created by: Ness Simons
- Written by: Ness Simons
- Directed by: Ness Simons
- Starring: Nikki Si'ulepa, Anji Kreft and Tess Jamieson-Karaha
- Country of origin: New Zealand
- Original language: English
- No. of seasons: 2
- No. of episodes: 12

Production
- Producer: Robin Murphy
- Cinematography: Pikihuia Haenga

Original release
- Release: 10 December 2017

Pot Luck is a dramedy web series that follows three friends as they negotiate friendship, family and romantic love in Wellington, New Zealand. Pot Luck is New Zealand's first lesbian web series. The first season was released in July 2016 followed by the second season on 10 December 2017. The show was made possible through crowdfunding, local business support, a city arts grant, an emerging artists trust and NZ On Air.

== Plot ==
At their weekly Tuesday night pot luck dinner, Debs (Anji Kreft), Mel (Nikki Si’ulepa) and Beth (Tess Jamieson-Karaha) make a pact to overcome their respective relationship issues. Debs must find a date after a six-year dry spell, Mel has to remain abstinent and Beth needs to come out to her mother and address their codependent relationship. Every Tuesday, the trio is joined by a revolving door of characters, often in the form of blind dates.

== Cast and crew ==
Of the cast and crew, 69 percent were women, 20 percent identified as LGBTQ+ and the team included Māori and Pacific Islanders.

- Debs (played by Anji Kreft) is described as a "shy and loveable butch" who struggles to find love after a difficult breakup six years prior.
- Mel (played by Nikki Si’ulepa) is Debs' closest friend and previously dated Beth. An aloof womaniser, she struggles with maturity and sometimes disregards her friends feelings.
- Beth (played by Tess Jamieson-Karaha) is the responsible one of the trio and acts as a carer for her mother whom she struggles to be honest with.

== Origins ==
Written and directed by Ness Simons, the series was inspired by her own experiences at pot lucks with friends and her desire to share stories that included LGBTQ+ characters. The series was produced by Robin Murphy of Robin Murphy Productions. She previously worked with Simons on the documentary web series, Active in Hell which followed three disabled young people participating in a work-training initiative with IHC and Hell Pizza. Pikihuia Haenga acted as director of photography and Jules Lovelock was first assistant director.
