= Roma pizza =

Roma pizza may refer to:

- Roman pizza
- Italian tomato pie, specifically that sold by Roma Pizza in Hamilton, Ontario

== See also ==
- Roman's Pizza
