= Wu Chao =

Wu Chao can refer to:

- Wu Chao (skier) (吴超, b. 1987)
- Wu Chao (weightlifter) (伍超, b. 1992)
- Wu Zetian, Chinese empress (624-705) (Wade–Giles spelling of alternative name 武曌)
- Wu Chao (actor), in the 2012 film Bunshinsaba (2012 film)
- Wu Chao (Three Kingdoms) (伍朝, c. 200 CE), scholar, see List of people of the Three Kingdoms (W)
- Wu Chao (judoka), silver medalist in 2010 East Asian Judo Championships
- Kro's Nest, chain of pizza restaurants in Beijing (pinyin: Wū Cháo)

== See also ==
- Wuchao, supply cache during the Battle of Guandu (200 CE), see Battle of Guandu#The raid on Wuchao
