= Topper's Pizza (Canadian restaurant) =

Canadian pizzeria chain

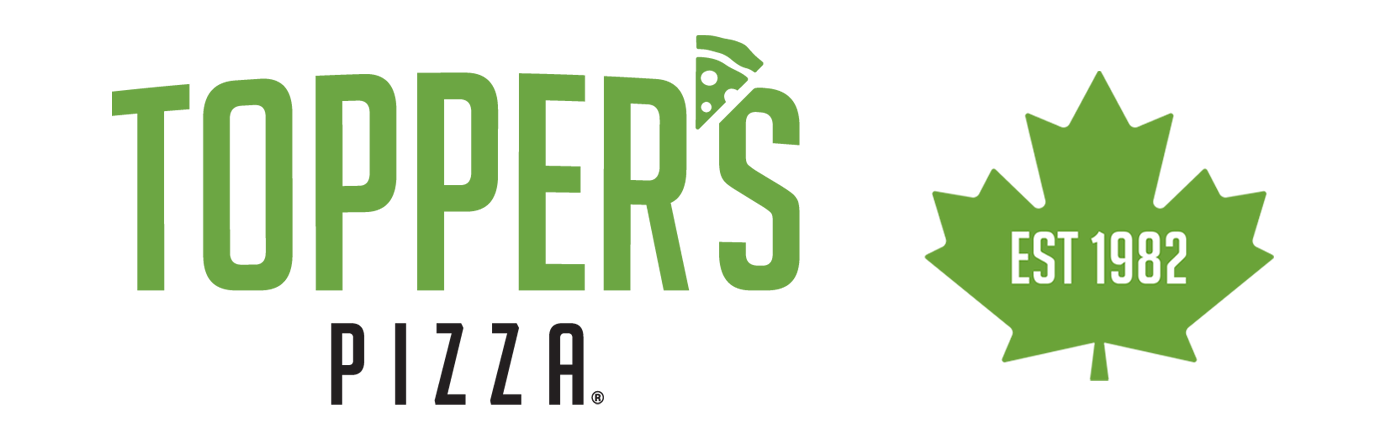
- Industry: Fast food
- Founded: Greater Sudbury, Ontario, Canada (1982; 44 years ago)
- Founder: Ronald Toppazzini
- Headquarters: Barrie, Ontario, Canada (Franchise Office); Sudbury, Ontario, Canada (Corporate Office)
- Number of locations: more than 35
- Area served: Ontario
- Key people: Keith Toppazzini (President & COO); Kelly Toppazzini (Chairman & CEO)
- Products: Pizza, Wings, TopperSticks™, Topperottis, Salads, Desserts, Drinks, Dipping Sauces
- Website: www.toppers.ca

Topper's Pizza Canada is a Canadian chain of pizzerias. The chain was launched in 1982 in Sudbury, Ontario by Ron Toppazzini as Mr. Topper's Pizza. The chain has more than 35 locations throughout Ontario.

== Human rights case ==
On September 14, 2013, Toppers Pizza in Georgetown fired an employee after discovering she was pregnant. The Human Rights Tribunal of Ontario determined this was illegal and ordered the store manager to complete a training course on human rights. Toppers was ordered to pay the woman $20,000.

In a statement following the hearing, the company said this was "an isolated incident", claiming it took equal employment policy very seriously and took the necessary precautions for the future.

On May 5, 2022, Ronald Toppazzini, founder of Toppers pizza was charged with sexual assault and sexual exploitation of minor, dating back to a claim from 1989.

== See also ==
- List of pizza chains
