= Smokin' Joe's =

Indian pizzeria chain

- Company type: Private
- Industry: Fast food
- Founded: Carmichael Road, Mumbai, Maharashtra, India 1993; 33 years ago
- Headquarters: Mumbai, Maharashtra, India
- Number of locations: 66 stores (2015)
- Area served: India, Oman
- Products: Pizza, Sandwich, Tandoor dishes, Desserts, Beverages
- Subsidiaries: Smokin' Lee's
- Website: www.smokinjoespizza.com

Smokin' Joe's is an Indian chain of pizzerias headquartered in Mumbai, India. It was founded in 1993 by Parsi entrepreneurs. Smokin' Joe's currently operates in number of cities in India. It has 66 stores throughout India (as of 2025).

Smokin' Joe's primarily concentrates on pizza and pizza related products such as pizza sandwiches. The menu features both vegetarian and meat products. Besides pizza, it also serves chicken wings, garlic bread, open subs, desserts, salads, and beverages.

== History ==
The restaurant chain opened its first store in Carmichael Road, Mumbai, on 21 July 1993. Smokin' Joe's national headquarters are located in the Nepeansea Road, Mumbai.

== Stores ==
Smokin' Joe's stores can be found in Mumbai as well as other regions, like Pune, Surat, Nashik, Chhatrapati Sambhajinagar, Lonavala, Chandigarh, Jammu, Srinagar, Yamuna Nagar, Bhubaneswar, Goa and Indore. Smokin' Joe's also plans to expand in Southern India.

== See also ==
- Fast food
- List of fast food restaurant chains
