= Snappy Tomato Pizza =

American pizza chain

- Type: Privately Held Company
- Industry: Restaurants
- Founded: Fort Mitchell, Kentucky (1978; 48 years ago)
- Headquarters: Burlington, Kentucky
- Area served: United States, United Kingdom
- Products: Pizza · Hoagies · Salads · Wings · Pastas · The Beast
- Website: www.snappytomato.com

Snappy Tomato Pizza is a pizza chain that started in Fort Mitchell, Kentucky, and has over 60 locations in the US. Its headquarters are in Burlington, Kentucky. The chain specializes in pizza, but also serves calzones, hoagies, salads, pasta, dessert and appetizers.

== History ==
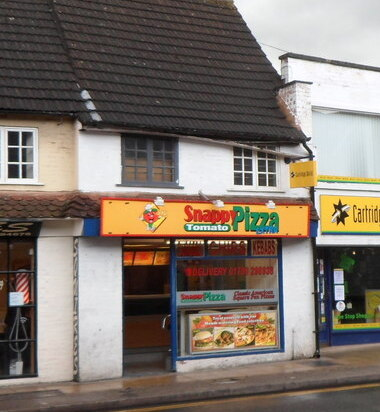
Snappy Tomato Pizza restaurant in the United Kingdom

The first Snappy Tomato Pizza was opened by Robert Rotunda in Fort Mitchell in 1978. Rotunda went to a horse race and put all of his money on a horse named “Snappy Tomato.” The horse won and Rotunda took all of his winnings and opened the first Snappy Tomato Pizza restaurant. In 1981 the company began franchising. In 1993, Snappy Tomato Pizza was purchased by Charles H. Deters.

Snappy Tomato has bought two other pizza franchises. Those two include a Cincinnati-based pizza franchise, "Spooners Pizza" in 1993, and seven Louisville, Kentucky–based franchises, "Pizza Magia" in 2005.

In July 2022, Tim Gayhart, Snappy Tomato Pizza's largest franchisee and area developer purchased the company from The Deters Company.

== Locations ==
There are several locations operating mostly in Kentucky. There are also dozens of locations in Ohio, Indiana, Tennessee, and one location in Clovis, New Mexico. There is also a subsidiary company headquartered in Redditch in the UK, with branches in England and Scotland.

== See also ==
- List of pizza chains of the United States
