= Eusebio Peñalver Mazorra =

Cuban dissident (1936–2006)

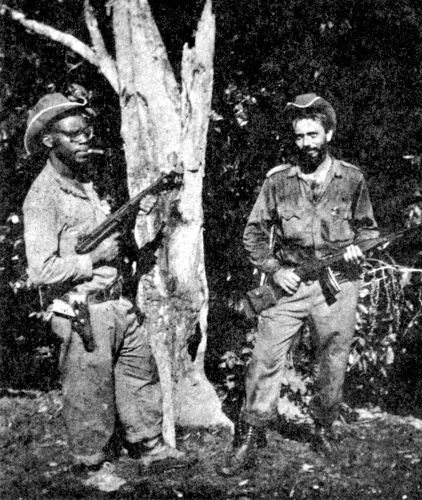
- Born: July 1, 1936; Ciego de Ávila, Camagüey, Cuba
- Died: 2006; Miami, Florida, U.S.
- Spouse: Francis Martinez

Eusebio Peñalver Mazorra (July 1, 1936 – 2006) was an Afro-Cuban anti-Castro political prisoner who was captured in 1960 during the Escambray rebellion and spent 28 years in prison before being released in 1988.

== Early life ==
He was born in Ciego de Avila, Camagüey, Cuba on July 1, 1936.

== Imprisonment ==
Peñalver alleged that during his time in prison he "suffered the most brutal tortures as a result of continuous harassment for 24 hours a day and seven days a week" and that these "tortures" allowed him to build "a shield of virile resistance" as a "plantado." In a 1999 interview with The Associated Press, he defined a "plantado" as a person who firmly plants his feet while struggling for freedom and democracy in Cuba. During the presidency of George W. Bush, Bush referred to Peñalver as a patriot.

He died in Miami in 2006.
