= Sarpino's Pizzeria =

International fast food restaurant chain specializing in pizza

- Company type: Privately held company
- Industry: Restaurants
- Founded: 2001; 25 years ago Victoria, British Columbia, Canada
- Founder: Gerry Koutougos
- Headquarters: Lincolnshire, Illinois (Sarpino's USA); Singapore (Sarpino's International); Victoria, BC (Sarpino's Canada)
- Number of locations: Over 70
- Area served: International
- Key people: Dmitry Shapiro; President, Sarpino's USA; Greg Blakney; CEO, Sarpino's International; Ensar Sehic; Director, Sarpino's Canada
- Products: Pizza
- Website: www.gosarpinos.com

Sarpino's Pizzeria is a Canadian fast food restaurant chain specializing in pizza, with international operations headquartered in Singapore and U.S. operations headquartered in the Chicago suburb of Lincolnshire, Illinois.

== History ==
The first Sarpino's pizza delivery store was opened by Gerry Koutougos in 2001 in Victoria, British Columbia. The name has its origins in a vacation that founder Gerry Koutougos took to Italy in 1999, where he visited a restaurant that was operated by a woman named Sarpina. Sarpino's expanded to Singapore in 2002 and to the United States in January 2003 with the opening of a Phoenix, Arizona location. Within a year after opening the first U.S. location, the chain had close to 20 American stores. During that first year, David Chatkin served as the original franchisee for two stores in the Chicago area and partnered with Dmitry Shapiro, a software consultant that previously served as a business analyst with Sears and Kraft Foods. Shapiro found that Chatkin's operations were not profitable due to lack of marketing, standardized operations, cost controls, and training. As a result, Shapiro purchased the U.S. operations from Koutougos in 2005 and renamed it Sarpino's USA. He then went on to develop the areas that were lacking to provide the needed support to franchisees. By 2013, Sarpino's USA grew to 47 stores throughout six states. By the end of 2014 it had grown to 65 U.S. locations with a goal of 350 stores open within five years.

Sarpino's is owned internationally (non-Canada/USA) by Greg Blakney and the headquarters is in Singapore.

== See also ==
- List of pizza chains
