= Dodo Pizza =

Russian pizza chain

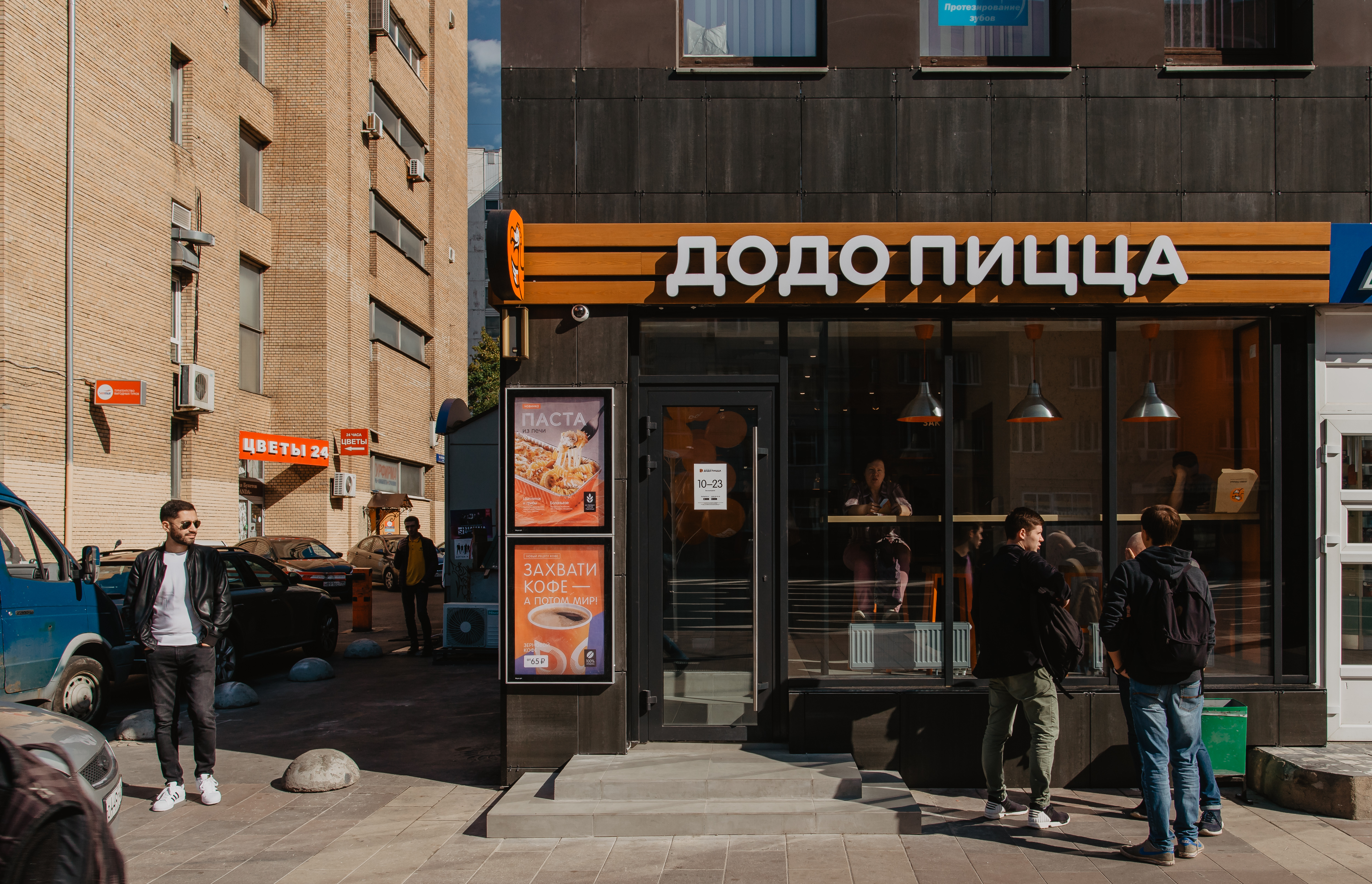
- Dodo Pizza in Moscow, 2018
- Native name: Додо Пицца
- Type: Private
- Industry: Food delivery; Franchising; Restaurants
- Founded: 2011; 15 years ago in Syktyvkar, Komi Republic, Russia
- Founders: Fyodor Ovchinnikov
- Headquarters: Dubai, United Arab Emirates
- Number of locations: 1,502 as of 11 August 2026
- Area served: List: Armenia; Azerbaijan; Belarus; Bulgaria; Croatia; Cyprus; Estonia; Georgia; Hungary (planned for 2026); Indonesia; Iraq (planned for 2026); Kazakhstan; Kyrgyzstan; Lithuania; Moldova (planned for 2026); Mongolia; Montenegro; Morocco (planned for 2026); Nigeria; Poland; Qatar; Romania; Russia; Serbia; Slovenia; Spain; Tajikistan; Turkey; UAE; Uzbekistan
- Key people: Dmitriy Soloviev (CEO)

Dodo Pizza (Russian: Додо Пицца) is an international pizza and fast-food restaurant chain legally domiciled in the Astana International Financial Centre in Astana, Kazakhstan. It was founded in 2011 in Syktyvkar, Russia. The company has over 1,500 locations in 29 countries in Europe, the Middle East, Asia, and Africa, including 1,150 locations in Russia and 131 locations in Kazakhstan.

The company focuses on information technology and uses a cloud computing-based system, Dodo IS, that collects and processes operations data, reports real-time business analytics, and helps kitchen and delivery staff to be more efficient by allowing for more informed decision-making.

== History ==
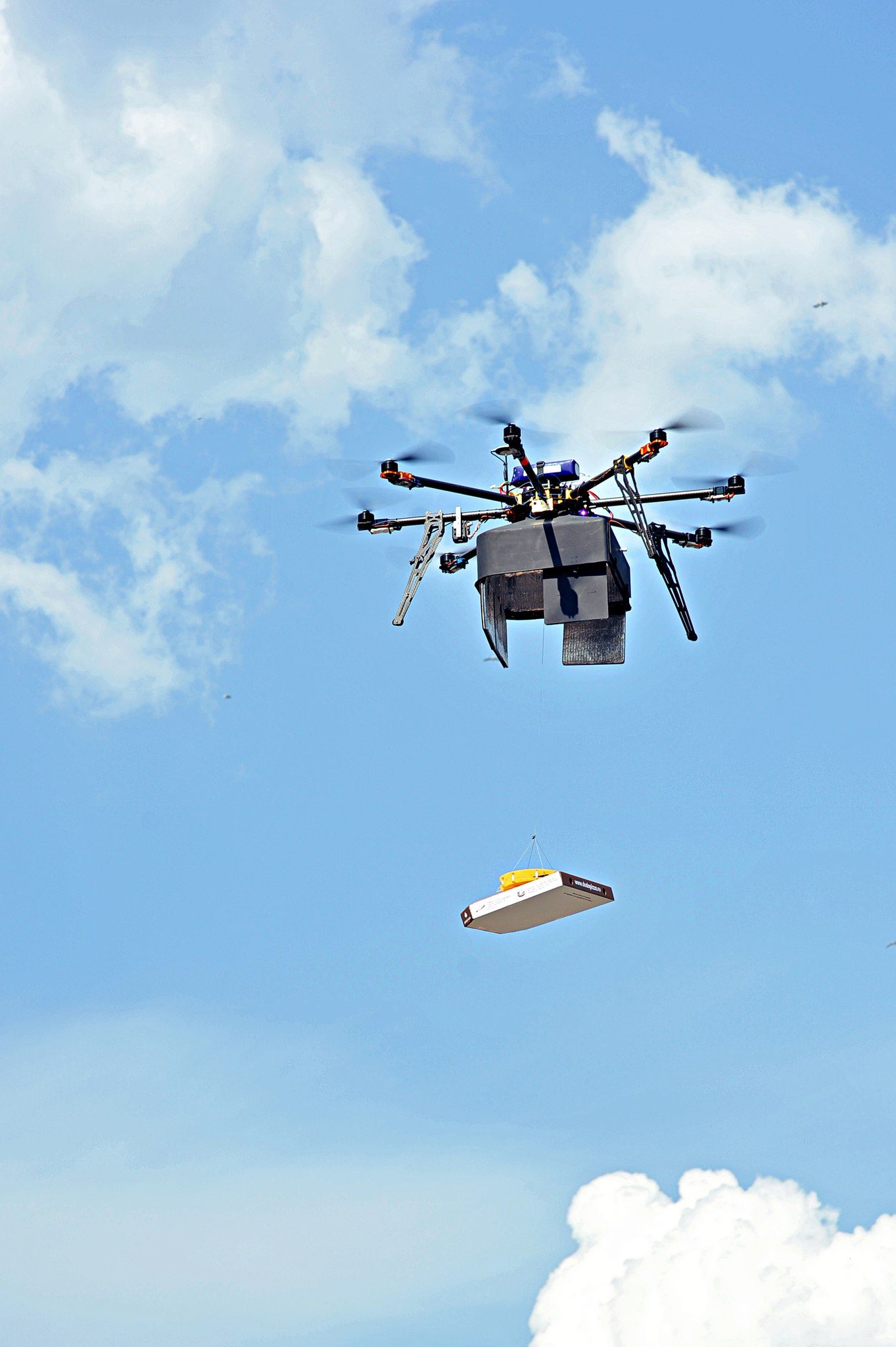
Octocopter drone of Dodo Pizza delivers pizza

Dodo Pizza was founded in 2011 by Russian entrepreneur Fyodor Ovchinnikov (also spelled Fedor Ovchinnikov), a former owner of a bookstore. The first location was in Syktyvkar, Russia.

A year later, the company began franchising, which allowed the business to grow rapidly: in 2014, there were 25 locations, a year later, 50, and by 2017, that number had exceeded 200.

In 2014, the company ran the largest crowdfunding initiative in Russia to date, raising over $2 million from 180 private investors. In Syktyvkar, the company also executed the first commercial delivery of pizzas by drone worldwide.

In March 2016, the company opened two pilot locations in the United States, in Oxford, Mississippi, and in Southaven, Mississippi; however, these locations were closed shortly thereafter.

In February 2018, an employee discovered a stash of illegal narcotics in a location in Moscow, operated by a franchisee allegedly involved in the illegal drug trade. The case did not hurt the founder or the company, which continued operations.

In September 2018, Fyodor Ovchinnikov announced that the chain would grow its IT team from 60 to 250 developers in two years.

By October 2019, Dodo Pizza doubled its IT staff.

In 2018, Dodo Pizza sold the franchise rights for Nigeria to Quality Foods Africa, the same group of British investors that brought Krispy Kreme to that continent's most populous country. The first 20 stores opened in October 2019 in Lagos.

In September 2019, Dodo Pizza opened a cashless pizza store in China.

In November 2019, the company received the GRLC Distinction Award for Innovation at the Global Restaurant Leadership Conference in Singapore.

In 2019, Vladimir Goretsky, a co-owner, was lured into Latvia under the pretext of a meeting with an investor, and later kidnapped and held hostage for ransom. After figuring out his passwords, the kidnappers stole ₽3.6 million and forced him to give another ₽900 thousand. He also was forced to sign ₽32 million of debt obligations.

In April 2021, the company closed its stores in China due to competition and poor performance.

In 2021, Evgeny Tkachev, a Dodo franchisee, filed a lawsuit against the company, disputing the decision of removing his Yaroslavl pizzeria from the chain, and accusing the owner of unfounded harassment and pressure to transfer the business to another owner.

In 2022, the company closed its five locations in the United Kingdom. The decision was due to international sanctions during the Russian invasion of Ukraine as well as declining sales.

In May 2025, the company shut its stores in Ho Chi Minh City, Vietnam.

In June 2025, the company moved its legal domicile from the British Virgin Islands to Kazakhstan.

In August 2025, Dodo Pizza entered the Moroccan market through a master franchise agreement with the local company M&I Group. The deal provides for the opening of two initial restaurants in Rabat in 2026 and includes a long-term plan to establish 35 locations across the country by 2034.

In February 2026, a Dodo Pizza delivery driver in Chelyabinsk, Russia, was fired after wrapping a shivering stray dog in a blanket during freezing weather, violating a strict new manager's policy. The firing sparked a massive nationwide boycott and severe online backlash against Dodo Pizza, which forced the company's founder, Ovchinnikov, to issue a public apology.

== International presence ==
=== Middle East ===
==== United Arab Emirates ====
The chain's first pizzeria in the UAE opened in Dubai in January 2023, with the first franchise location following in June 2024. According to the industry publication Bizpreneur Middle East, 13 pizzerias were operating in the UAE by mid-2026.

== Financials ==
In 2020, the chain's revenue was ₽22.3 billion, making it the fourth largest chain in Russia by revenue.

=== Dodo Brands’ Financial Performance for 2025 ===
In 2025, marking its 15th year in business, Dodo Brands reported system-wide revenue of $1.8 billion, up 22% year-on-year. During 2025, Dodo Pizza entered the Qatari, Mongolian, Montenegrin and Spanish markets and signed master franchise agreements covering Mexico, Morocco, Iraq and Hungary. According to QSR Magazine, as of April 2026 the chain operated 1,700 locations across 26 countries.

== See also ==
- List of pizza chains
- List of pizza franchises
- List of pizza varieties by country
