= Pizza Celentano =

Ukrainian pizza restaurant chain

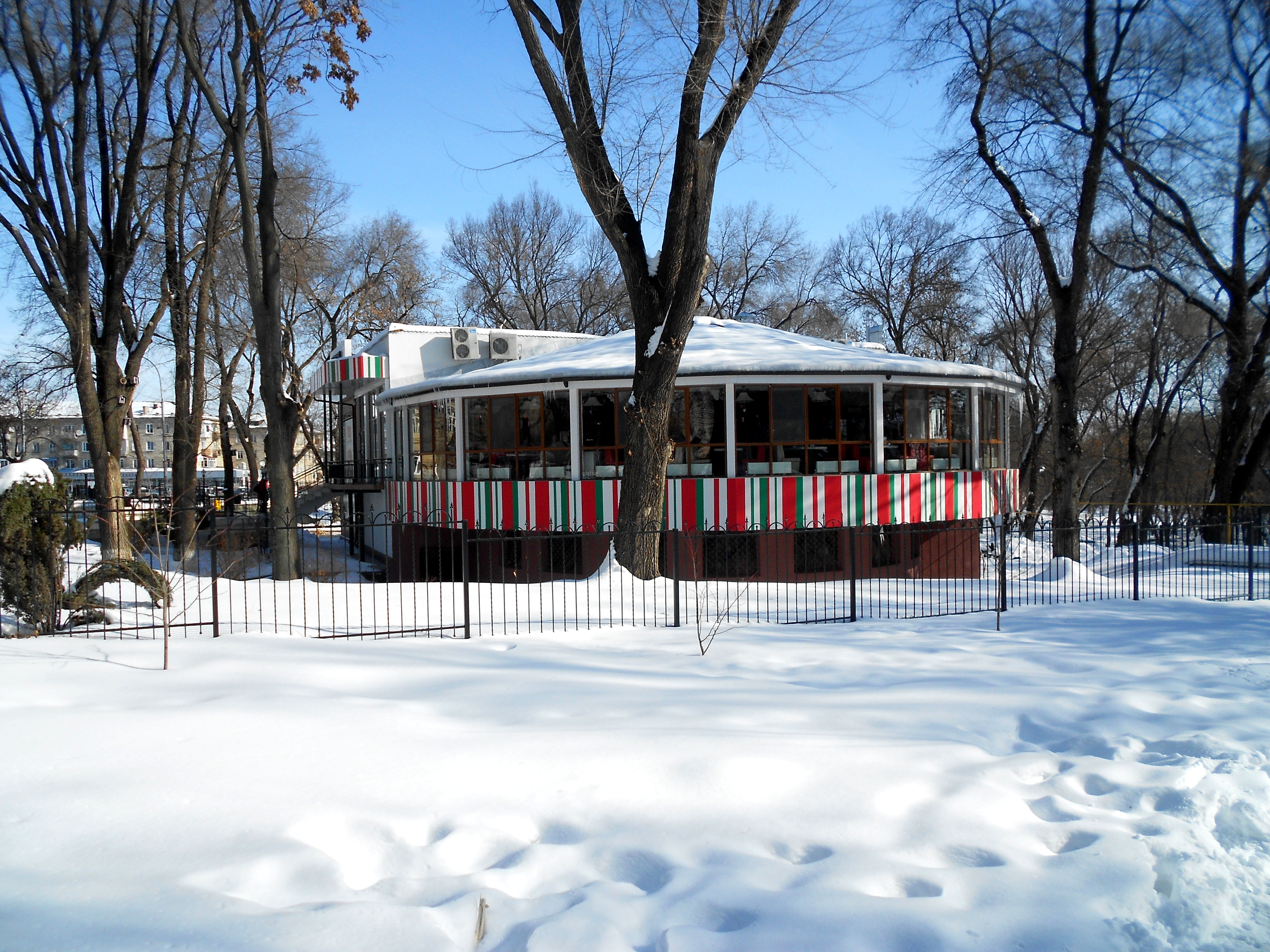
- Bălți, Moldova location
- Industry: Food Industry
- Founded: 1997
- Headquarters: Lviv, Ukraine
- Areas served: Ukraine, Moldova
- Products: Pizza
- Website: egoisty.com

Pizza Celentano (Ukrainian: Піца Челентано) is a Ukrainian franchise quick-service pizza restaurant chain. It was founded in 1997 in Lviv. There are over 150 restaurants in Ukraine as of 2018.

Typical locations include motorways, airports, railway stations, high streets, shopping malls and trade fairs. There are sold only whole pizza with a variable number of dressings (some fixed, some seasonal, some special), along with pizza slices, calzones and other fast food fares such as soft drink, salads, and desserts are available. Meals can be eaten in the restaurant or purchased for take-away.

== History ==
In August 1998, the first fast food restaurant of the Pizza Celentano brand was opened in Lviv. The pizzeria had a characteristic interior, service system, original recipe.

In 1999, after the opening of the second pizzeria in Lviv, two franchise establishments appeared: in Kyiv and Khmelnytsky. In 2018, there are more than 150 restaurants in Ukraine under the Pizza Celentano brand. The chain's 100th restaurant was opened in Kyiv on Mykhailo Kotsyubynskoho Street in July 2007.

== EgoIsty ==
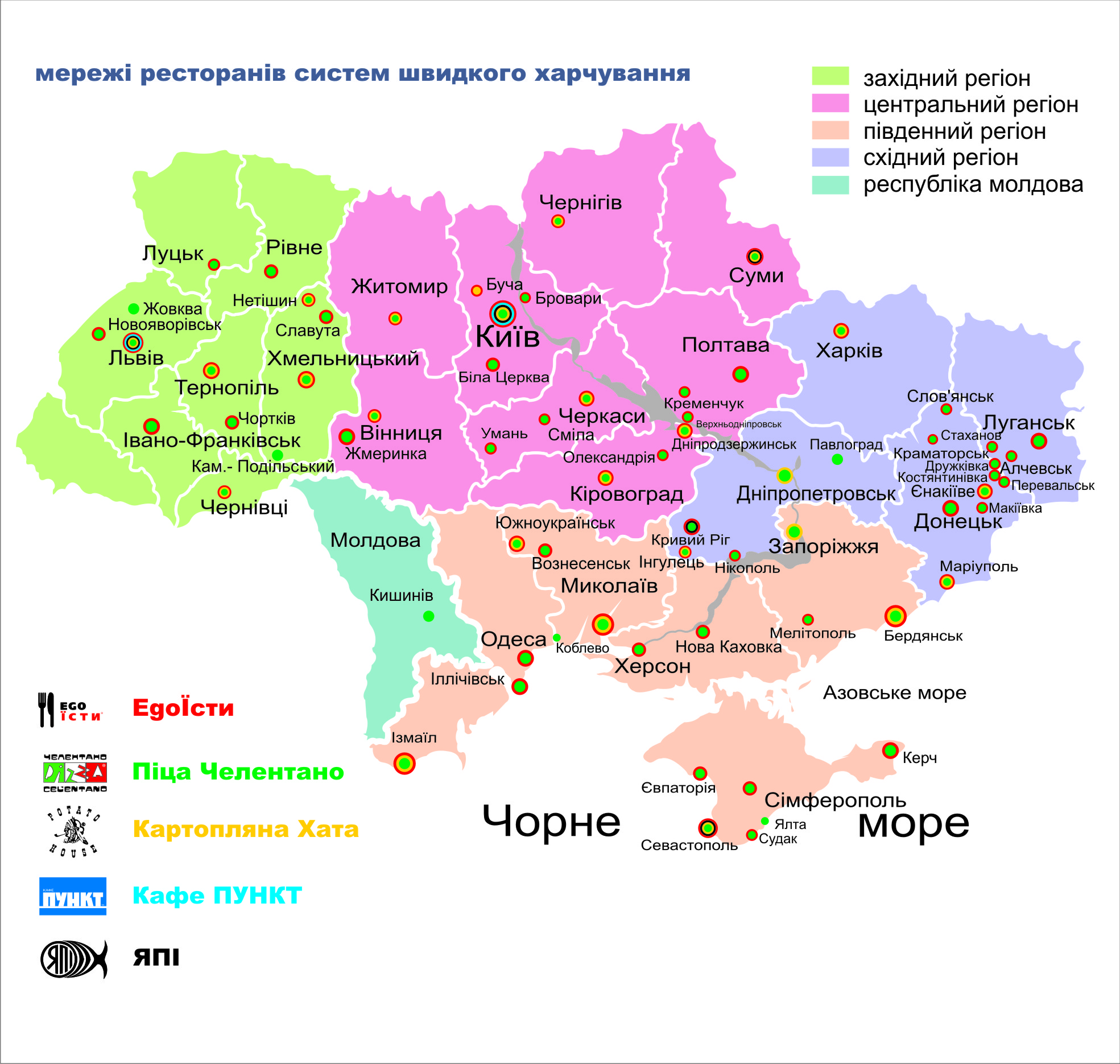
Map of restaurants of chain

In December 2006, the EgoIsty (ЕgoЇсти) loyalty program was launched in all regions of Ukraine. This is a club of loyal customers in which customers receive cumulative discounts, enjoy the privileges provided by partners and organizers of the program.

EgoIsty Club combines fast food restaurants "Pizza Celentano", "Potato House", "Cafe Point", and restaurants of Japanese cuisine "Yapi".

== Conflict with Adriano Celentano ==
The name "Pizza Celentano" is based on the name of the famous Italian singer and actor - Adriano Celentano. Celentano has repeatedly expressed dissatisfaction with the use of his name for commercial purposes, including this restaurant chain. When the Pizza Celentano chain started opening its establishments in Moldova, Celentano sued the brand for using his name, but lost. The owners of the pizzeria try not to mention the name "Adriano", because the Italian singer has his own registered trademarks - "Clan Celentano" and "Adriano Celentano".

== Advertisement campaigns ==
In their free time, couriers paint advertisements on the sidewalks with the help of stencils and white paint.
