= Origus =

Chinese Western-style buffet chain

- Industry: Restaurant chain
- Founded: 1998
- Headquarters: Beijing, China
- Area served: China
Beijing Origus Food & Beverage Ltd.
- Traditional Chinese: 北京好倫哥餐飲有限公司
- Simplified Chinese: 北京好伦哥餐饮有限公司
Transcriptions
Standard Mandarin
- Hanyu Pinyin: Běijīng Hǎolúngē Cānyǐn Yǒuxiàngōngsī
- Website: www.origus.com

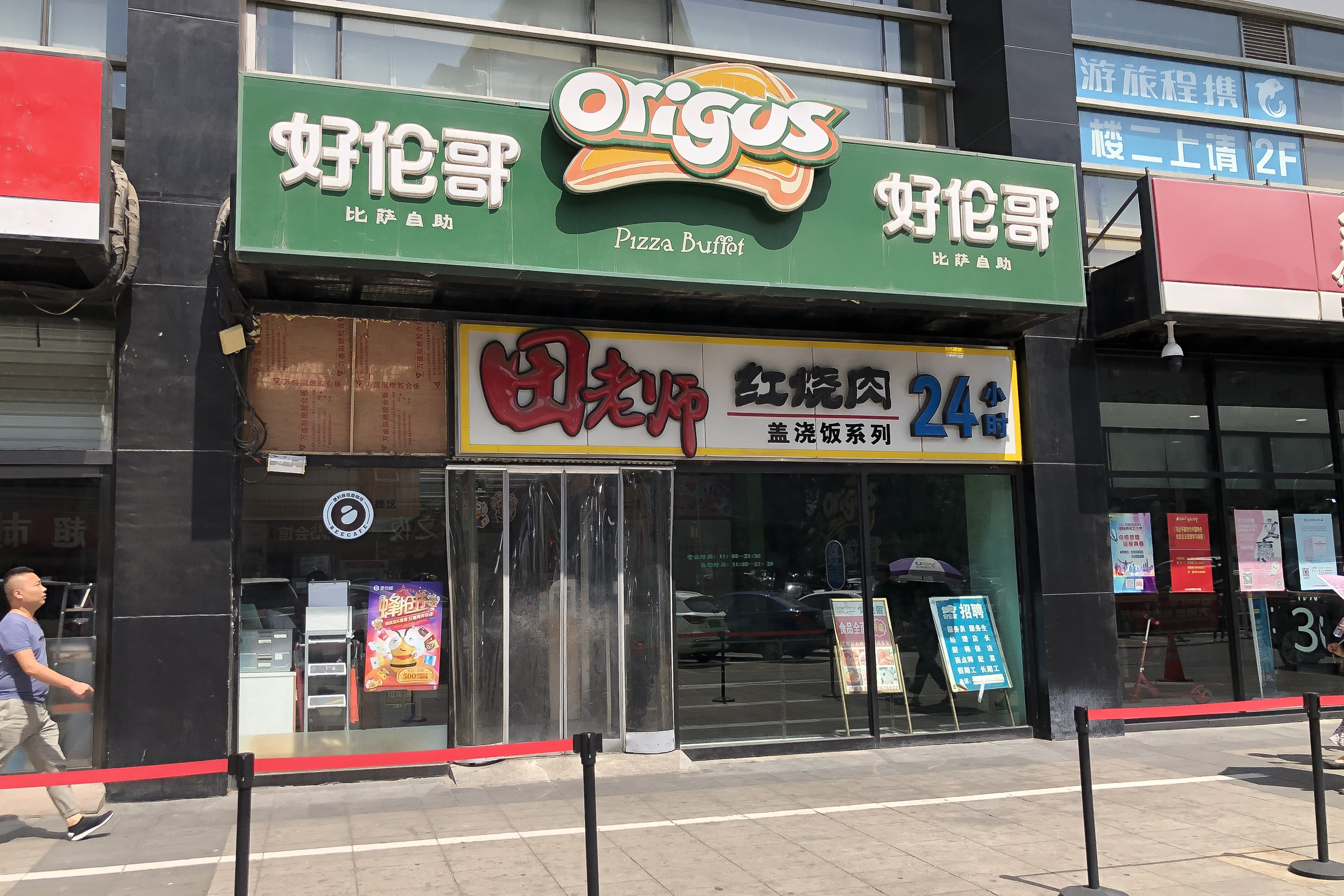
Origus, Zhongguancun Book Building, Zhongguancun, Beijing

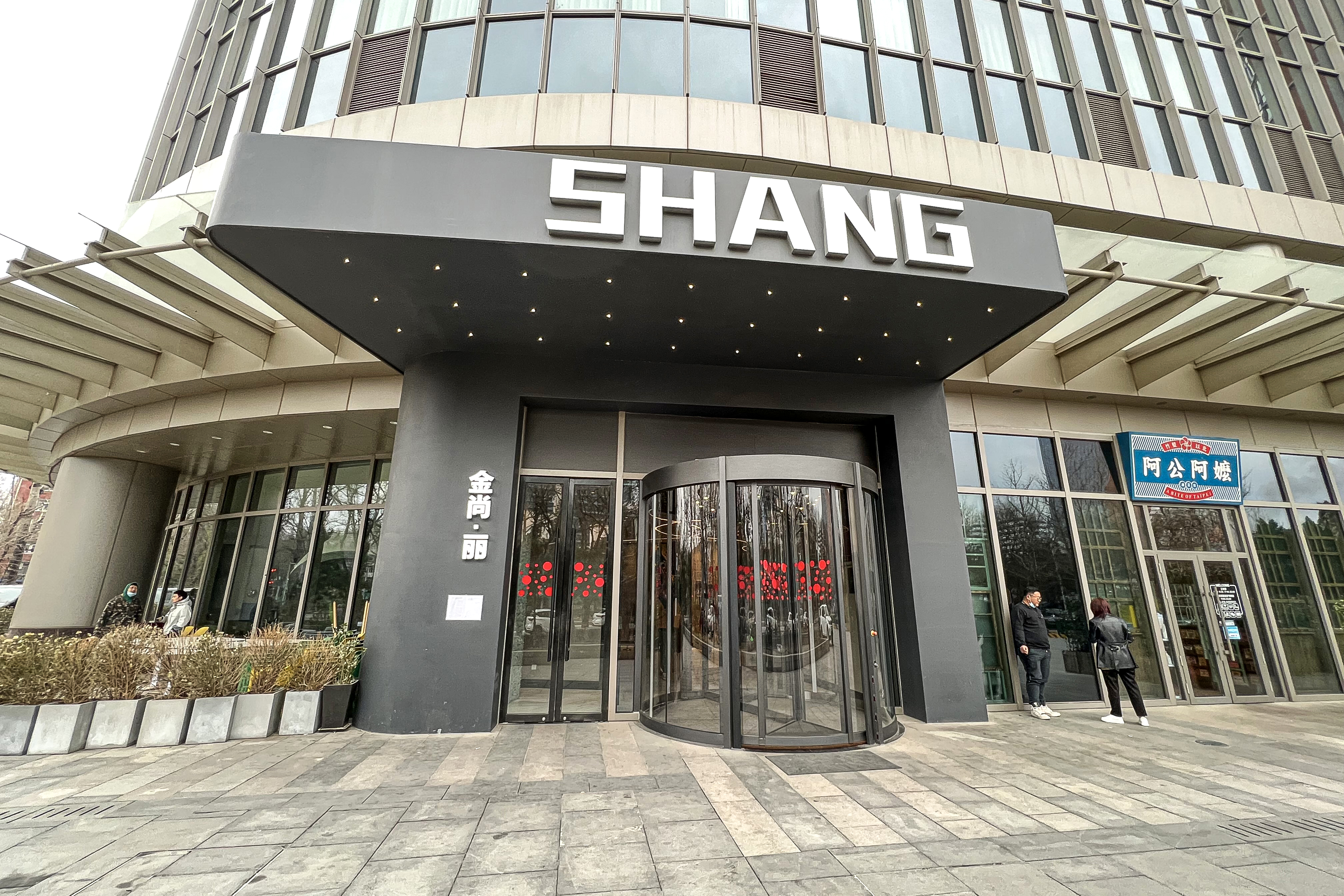
Shang Office Building (金尚丽办公大楼), which houses the headquarters

Beijing Origus Food & Beverage Ltd., doing business as Origus Pizza Buffet (simplified Chinese: 好伦哥批萨自取; traditional Chinese: 好倫哥批薩自取; pinyin: Hǎolúngē Pīsà Zìqǔ) or Origus (好伦哥; 好倫哥; Hǎolúngē), is a Chinese Western-style buffet chain. It is headquartered in Chaoyang District, Beijing.

== History ==
It was founded in 1998, by Mu Ji. Foreign investment was used to start the company.

As of February 2007 the company had locations in Beijing, Shanghai, Shenzhen, Hangzhou, and Jinzhou. That month the company opened its first restaurant in Lanzhou.

By March 2007 prices at Origus per person had been raised from 39 yuan to 39.99 yuan. Around that time some customers in Beijing reported getting only one fen (one hundredth of a yuan) in change.

As of 2014 it had over 100 restaurants; they were located in larger cities. That year, MUS Roosevelt Capital Partners invested an undisclosed amount into Origus.

== Corporate affairs ==
It is headquartered in the Shang Office Building (金尚丽办公大楼) in Chaoyang District, Beijing.

It was previously in a building on Beiyuan Road, and on another occasion in Wangjiao Plaza in Wangjing Subdistrict of Chaoyang District.
