= Pizza Lab (restaurant chain) =

Bulgarian fast food chain

- Type: Private
- Industry: Fast food restaurant
- Founded: 2015 (11 years ago)
- Founders: Kristian Velev; Filinka Milanova; Ahmed Mounla
- Headquarters: Sofia, Bulgaria
- Number of locations: 27 (2026)
- Area served: Bulgaria
- Key people: Kristian Velev (CEO)
- Products: Pizza, salads
- Revenue: ▲BGN 10.1 million (2021)
- Owner: Philly Vibe AD
- Number of employees: 289 (2026)
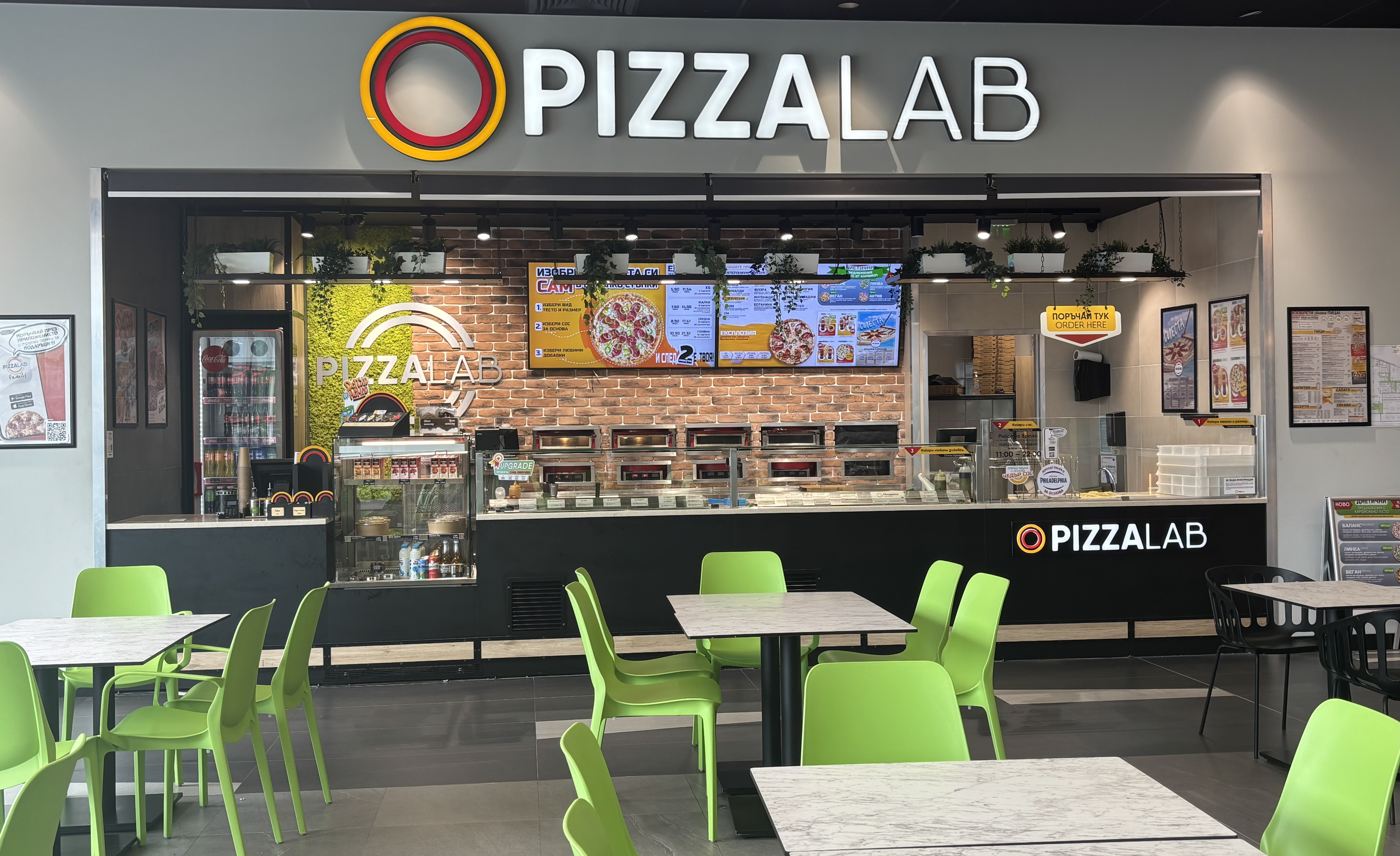
- Website: pizzalab.bg/en

Pizza Lab is a Bulgarian chain of fast food pizza restaurants founded in 2015. It is the second largest pizza chain in the country, behind the local franchise of Domino's. The chain offers fast service and takeout, and has restructured to focus more on delivery following the COVID-19 pandemic. Though the menu also features a selection of salads, the chain is primarily focused on quickly-baked pizzas, including a menu, sweet dessert pizzas, and custom orders that are advertised as ready in two minutes.

For a period in the early 2020s, its parent company, Philly Vibe AD, additionally owned and operated the Bulgarian food chain Skarra and Baozi-focused chain Bao Bar in the country.

== See also ==
- Fast food
- List of pizza chains
