= Čili =

Restaurant chain in Lithuania and Latvia

- Company type: Joint Stock Company
- Industry: Restaurants
- Founded: 1997; 29 years ago in Vilnius, Lithuania
- Founder: Tadas Karosas
- Products: Pizza; pasta; desserts
- Revenue: €22.752 million (2022)
- Website: cili.lt

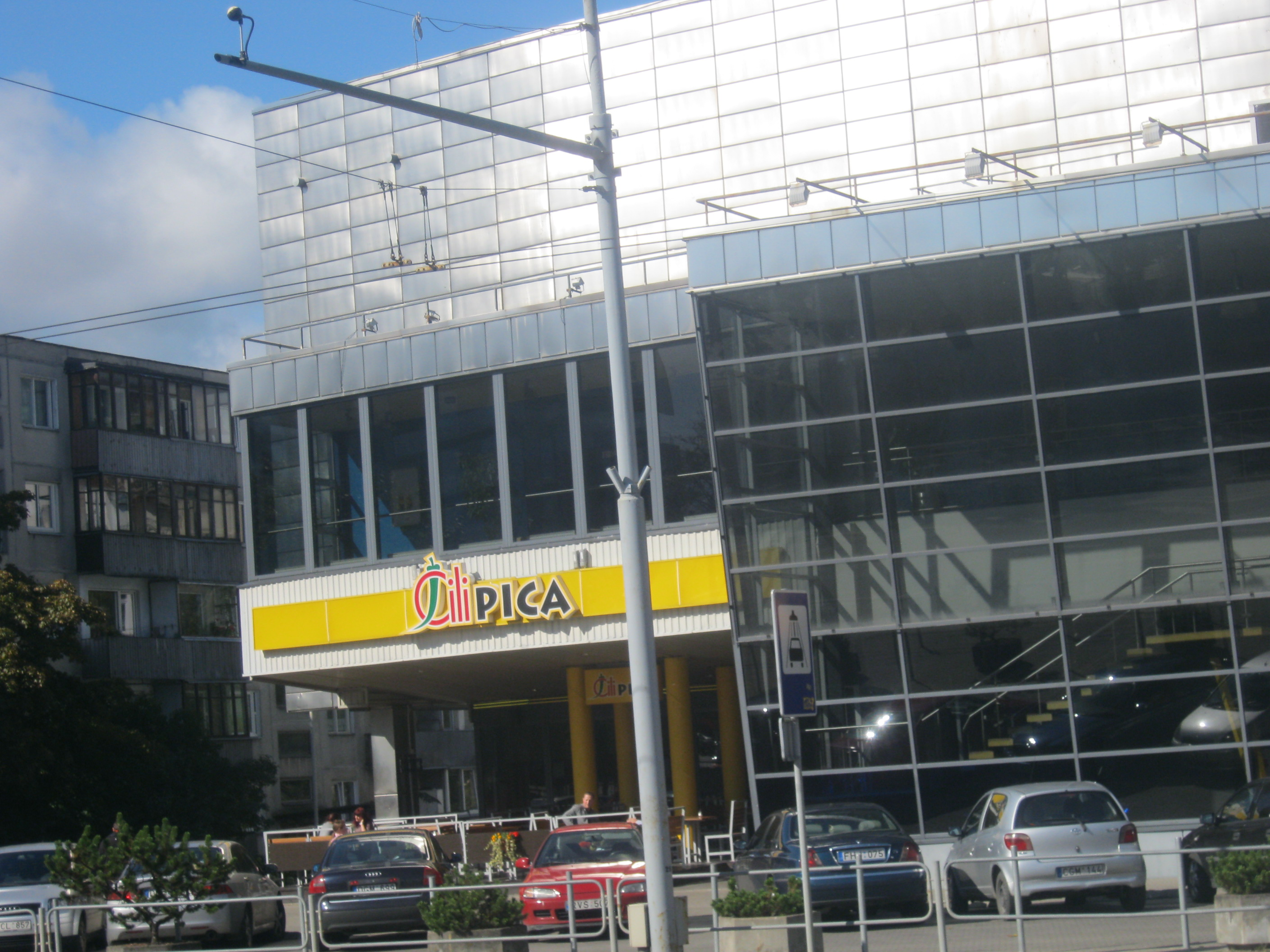
Čili Pica restaurant in Vilnius, Lithuania

Čili is a restaurant chain in Lithuania and Latvia. It started as a pizza restaurant, but soon diversified into different areas.

== History ==
In 1997, the first Čili Pica restaurant was opened on Konstitucijos Avenue in Vilnius, Lithuania. From 1999 onwards the company, renamed UAB Čilija, began to diversify, adding bistros in 2000, traditional Lithuanian-style restaurants in 2002, Chinese restaurants in 2003, coffee shops in 2004 and drive-ins in 2006.

The first restaurant outside Vilnius was opened in Palanga. The company soon expanded into other countries, opening its first non-Lithuanian restaurant in December 2001 in the Latvian city of Liepāja. As of May 2009, there were 79 outlets in five countries, some of them established via franchising. In 2009, the share capital of the holding was Lt 90.79 million (EUR 26.3 million). In 2009―2010, UAB "Vilsarmos investicija" bought 67.06% shares of "Čili Holdings", which managed the restaurant chain. In 2024, the Lithuanian company UAB "Čili pica" employed 487 people.
