= Jeno's Pizza (Colombia) =

Colombian pizzeria chain

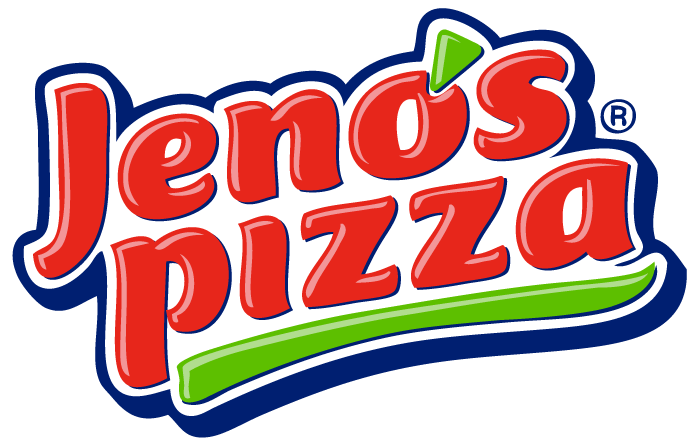
- Industry: Restaurants
- Founded: Bogotá, Colombia (1973; 53 years ago)
- Products: Italian-American cuisine pizza · pasta · desserts
- Number of employees: 1000+
- Parent: Telepizza
- Website: Jeno's Pizza

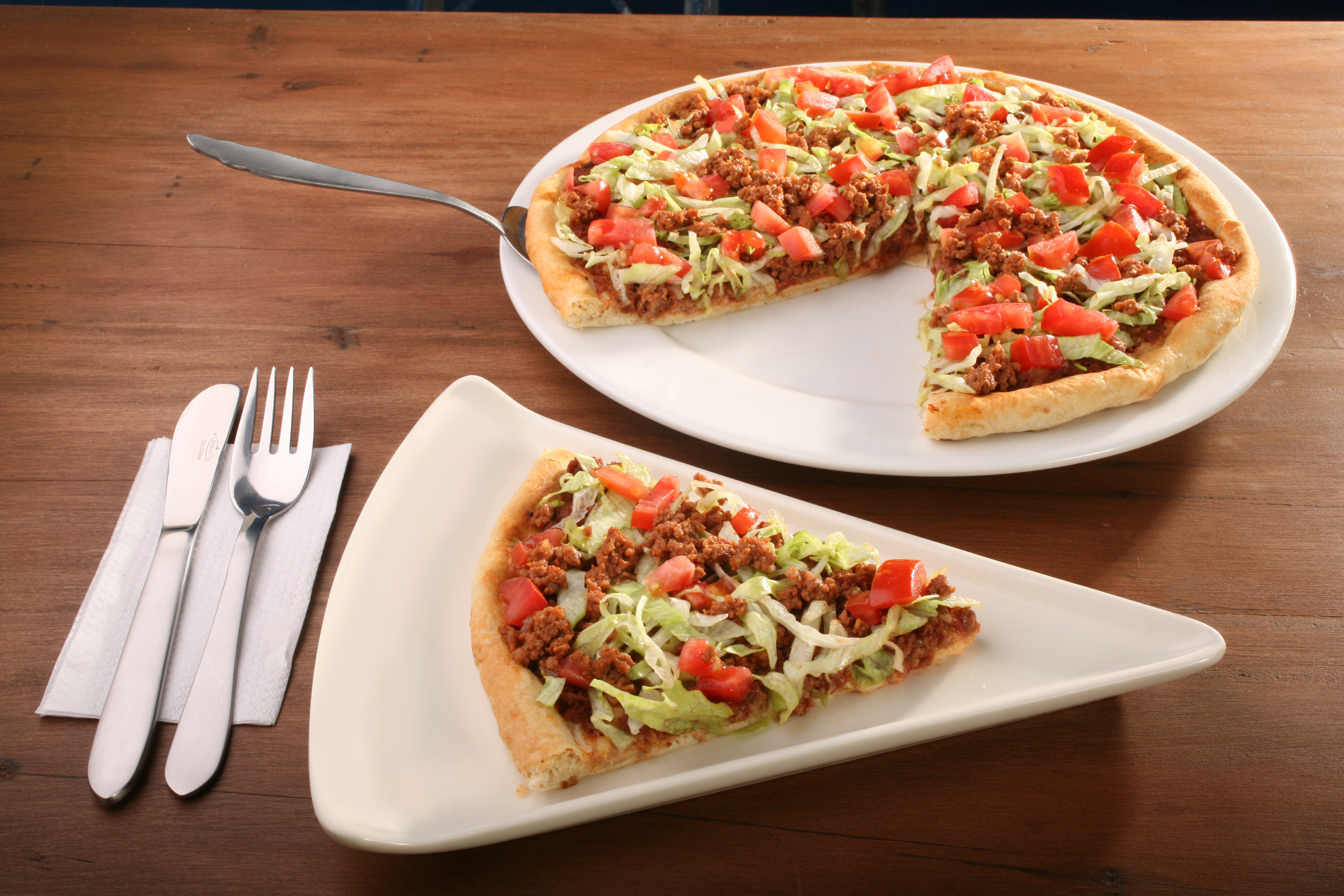
A burger pizza

Jeno's Pizza is a pizzeria chain based in Colombia. It was acquired by Telepizza in 2010.

== History ==
Jeno's Pizza was established on 1 October 1973 in Bogotá. A second location opened in 1976. The original restaurants catered to children and families. They later created Jeno's Club on December 11, 1992, which are locations with play areas for children.

In June 2010 the chain was acquired by the multinational Telepizza, adding to their more than 900 restaurants worldwide. By December 2010, the company completed the refurbishment of 15 of its 80 outlets continuing this work in 2011 to modernize its existing infrastructure. Jeno's Pizza additionally implemented an expansion plan for 2011, planning to open 30 new locations for a total of 110 outlets. The opening of new locations of Jeno's Pizza were held in Bogotá, Cali, Medellín, Barranquilla, Cartagena, and Bucaramanga. Pereira, Manizales and Armenia added Jeno's Pizza locations in 2011.
