= Maestro Pizza =

- Type: Subsidiary
- Industry: Restaurant
- Genre: Fast food restaurant
- Founded: 2013; 13 years ago
- Founder: Khalid Al Omran
- Headquarters: Riyadh, Saudi Arabia
- Number of locations: 162 (2026)
- Area served: Saudi Arabia, UAE
- Products: Pizza
- Parent: Daily Food Co.
- Website: maestropizza.com

Maestro Pizza (Arabic: مايسترو بيتزا) is a Saudi pizza restaurant chain founded in 2013 in Riyadh, by Khalid al Omran. The chain operates 162 restaurants worldwide.

small pizza chain in 2012, and after a year of study, he used it as a foundation to establish Maestro Pizza.[4][5]

== Locations ==
Country/Territory	Date of first store	No. of operating outlets
Saudi Arabia	2013	140
United Arab Emirates	2022	22
