= Leopoldo Fernández Pujals =

Spanish businessman

- Born: Leopoldo Fernández Pujals; December 3, 1947 (age 78); Havana, Cuba
- Occupation: Entrepreneur

Leopoldo Fernández Pujals, born on March 12, 1947, is a Cuban-born Spanish-American businessman.”

== Biography ==
Leopoldo Fernández Pujals was born in Cuba to an affluent Spanish family. His Catalan mother was an architect and his Asturian father was a notary. One year after the Cuban Revolution, when Leopoldo was 13 years old, his family went into exile in Miami. In 1968, he enlisted in the Marines at the officer school of Fort Belvoir in Virginia. He ranked first in his class, later becoming an instructor. He fought in the Vietnam War, from which he returned to the United States with a medal and captain's bars.

He studied finance and went to work at the multinational Procter & Gamble. He later moved to Johnson & Johnson in 1981. Six years later he opened a pizzeria on Monforte de Lemos street in El Barrio del Pilar, Madrid, where he kneaded pasta and gave it to the children in the neighborhood. In the mornings, Leopoldo went to work at Johnson & Johnson in a suit and tie; in the afternoon, he put on his apron and made pizzas until the early hours of the morning, including weekends. He then set up Pizzaphone, which later became Telepizza. In 1993, it had 100 stores in Spain, which grew to 150 a year later and 204 the following year.

In 1996, a dispute with his brother over the company's management left him in charge. In May 1997, Leopoldo acquired Pizza World for 1.9 billion pesetas (US$12,524,200). After that, he bought a transport company and then its cheese supplier. By mid-1998, it had achieved a market share of 62 percent. The business continued to grow and diversify both in Spain and abroad, until in 1999 it sold all its shares, an operation for which it received some 300 million euros. In 1995 he created the Centurión stud farm, the largest stud farm of purebred Spanish horses in San Pedro de las Dueñas, Lastras del Pozo, province of Segovia.

In September 2004, Fernández Pujals launched into the world of telecommunications, by acquiring 24.9 percent of Jazztel, a broadband operator created in 1997 by Argentine Martin Varsavsky. Fernández Pujals contributed 61.8 million euros (US$67,320,900) to relaunch the company. In 2009, the founder of Telepizza returned to his origins and participated in the creation of a chain of pizzerias, La Original, together with two of his former directors from Telepizza, Pedro Español and Miguel Ángel Rodríguez.
