= Pizza Lab (Leipzig restaurant) =

Restaurant information
- Established: 2016
- Food type: Pizza
- Location: Leipzig, Germany
- Website: pizzalab.de

Pizza Lab is a non-profit vegan restaurant in Leipzig that was founded in 2016. It is entirely run by a team of volunteers from all over the world and the surplus is donated to local charities that focus on sustainability, environmental protection, animal warfare, and good neighborliness. The location in which Pizza Lab operates used to be a meat distribution center, according to a permit issued in 1939.

Customers are encouraged to experiment with a selection of toppings listed on a menu inspired by the periodic table.

== Events ==
Because Pizza Lab is not profit-oriented, the events organized in its venue are more-similar to a community space than a business, such as tattoo parties, nude drawing classes, yoga, open-mic, diary slams, haircutting meetings, DIY workshops, readings, life drawing, pillow-fights, science lectures, LEGO parties, and meeting location for non-profit projects. The location features a small stage where artists regularly play.

== Crowdfunding ==
A crowdfunding campaign was started in August 2019 to raise 20,000 Euros in order to comply with local regulations by building a fire protection ceiling, fire protection door, and expanded escape routes.

Two months later, the campaign was declared a success with more than 22,000 Euros collected in donations from more than 500 supporters, including companies, politicians, neighbors, friends, and sympathizers.
