= Hell Pizza =

New Zealand-based pizza restaurant chain

Hell

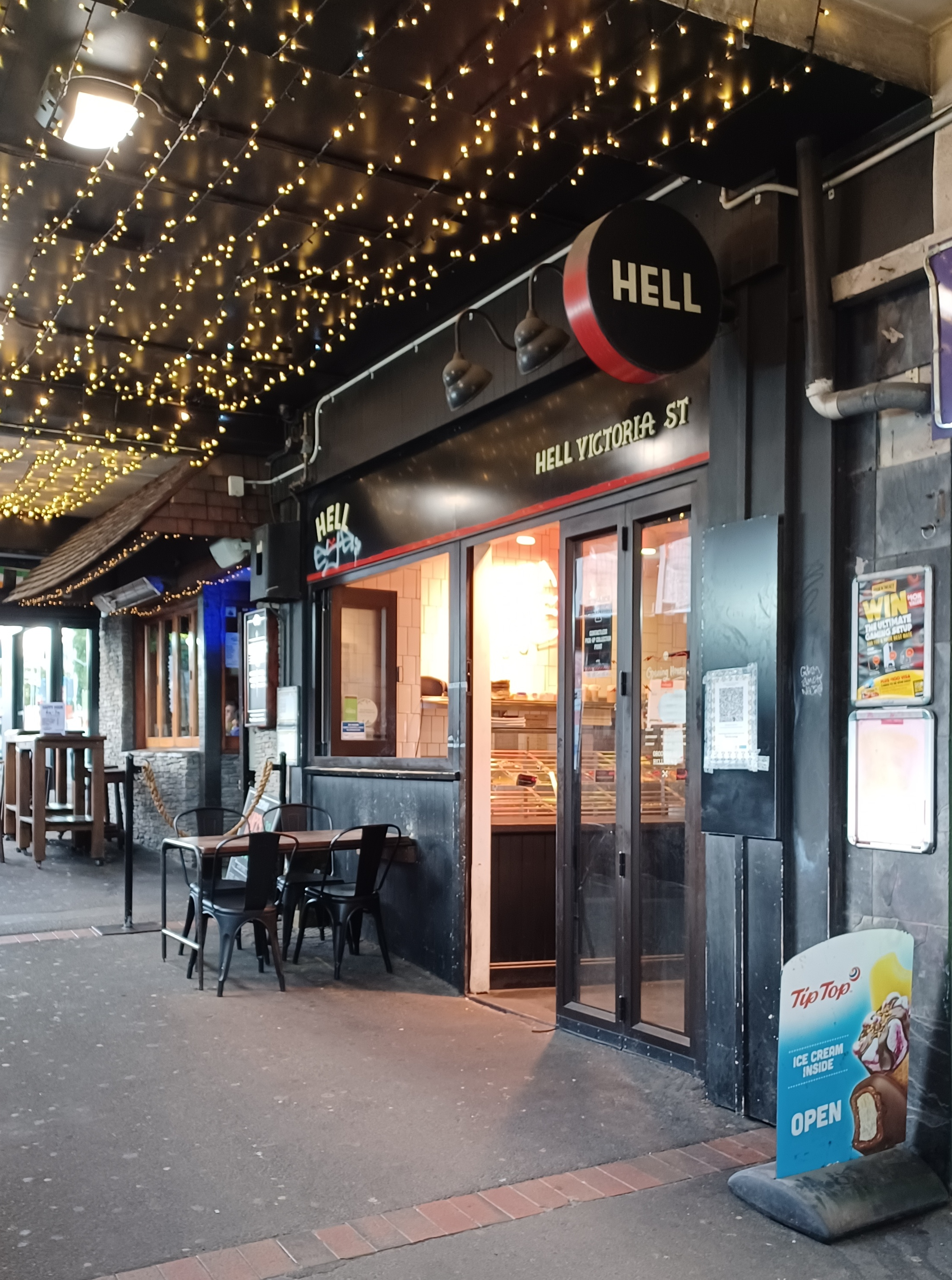
- Type: Limited
- Industry: Fast food
- Founded: June 23, 1996; 30 years ago in Kelburn, Wellington
- Headquarters: New Zealand
- Products: Pizza, Pasta, Salads
- Website: hellpizza.nz

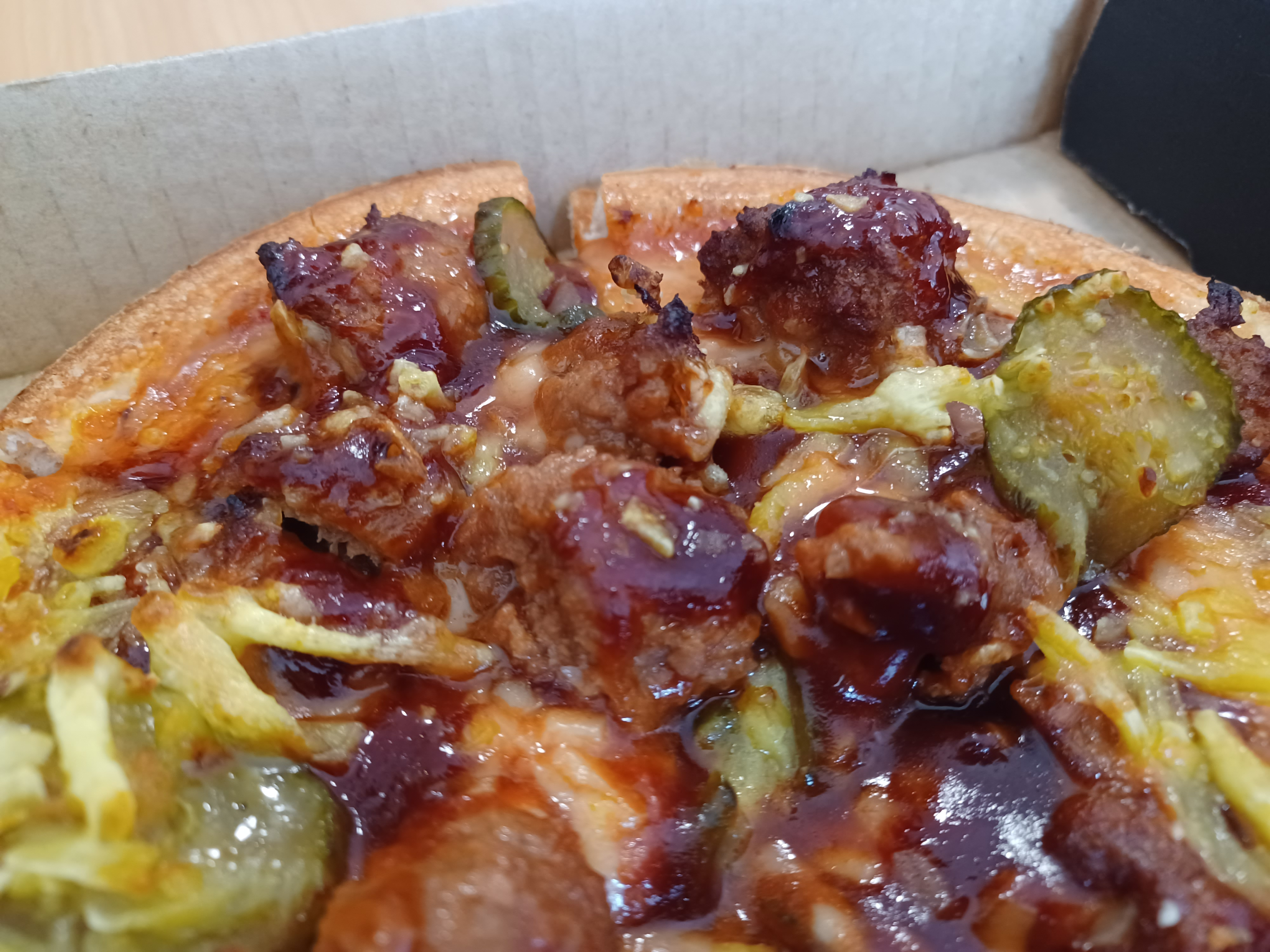
Plant-based burger pizza

Hell Pizza is a New Zealand–based pizza chain. It was established in Wellington in 1996 and has since expanded around New Zealand.

Franchises have also operated at various times in the United Kingdom, Ireland, Canada, South Korea, India and Queensland, Australia.

== History ==
Hell Pizza was founded by Callum Davies in 1996 as a pizza shop in Kelburn, Wellington, next to Victoria University of Wellington.. He was joined by Stu McMullin and Warren Powell in 1999. Davies was inspired by the quirky imaging of The Fish, a radio station in Taupō, to give his restaurant more personality. The second store was opened in Hataitai, Wellington. By then, it was also one of the first fast food stores to allow online ordering.

The founders sold the New Zealand master franchise rights to Tasman Pacific Foods (the New Zealand master franchisee for Burger King) for $15 million in 2006. They purchased the rights back in 2009.

In 2009, Hell had 61 stores in New Zealand. It had six stores in Brisbane and was planning nine more around South East Queensland. It was also trialing stores in Fulham, London, and Dublin, Ireland.

In July 2010, after hackers attacked the Hell Pizza customer database, 230,000 customers were advised to change their passwords.

In 2012, Hell had 65 stores in New Zealand. It had three stores in South Korea and was planning seven more. It had two stores in Queensland, but eight others had closed. A pizza bar in New Delhi and its stores in London, Dublin, and Vancouver were still operating.

In 2016, Hell Pizza had 66 outlets, all in New Zealand.

As of November 2022, Hell Pizza had 77 outlets across New Zealand, with 61 in the North Island (including 28 in Auckland) and 16 in the South Island. The only major urban areas that do not have a Hell Pizza outlet are Nelson and Gisborne.

== Marketing ==
The Hell theme is used in the menu. Hell Pizza offers seven standard pizzas which are named after the seven deadly sins. The chain also offers discounted pizzas on Friday the 13th.

The company is known for its controversial advertising.

On 31 October 2006 Hell announced through a press release it would be promoting its "Lust" pizza by distributing 170,000 branded condoms. The Family First Lobby said Hell has "crossed the line of what is decent and acceptable advertising material to be put in letterboxes of families". It was later revealed that the condoms failed to comply with New Zealand labelling and packaging requirements, and remaining stocks were destroyed.

In November 2008, while under management from Tasman Foods, Hell Pizza New Zealand apologised for an advertisement featuring the skeletal remains of Sir Edmund Hillary, Heath Ledger, and the Queen Mother, dancing on gravestones. The apology was made to Hillary's family, which complained the ad was in "extremely poor taste". The ad was withdrawn from the company's website on 3 November.

In October 2021, Hell Pizza drew media attention and controversy after launching an advertisement campaign telling Swedish climate change activist Greta Thunberg "to go to Hell" in response to her remarks criticising New Zealand's efforts to address climate change. Hell Pizza CEO Ben Cumming confirmed he has sent a personal invitation to Thunberg to witness the company's efforts to address climate change, environmental pollution, and reduce waste. The company had attempted to secure a large billboard for the advertisement in Thunberg's hometown of Stockholm, but local authorities had deemed it offensive.

== Labelling ==
In June 2019, the fake meat of a burger pizza, made by Beyond Meat, met food standards but caused controversy as it was labelled as a "burger" pizza but contained vegan burger patties.

== See also ==
- List of restaurants in New Zealand
- List of pizza chains
