= Napoli Pizza and Fried Chicken =

Taiwanese pizza and fried chicken restaurant chain

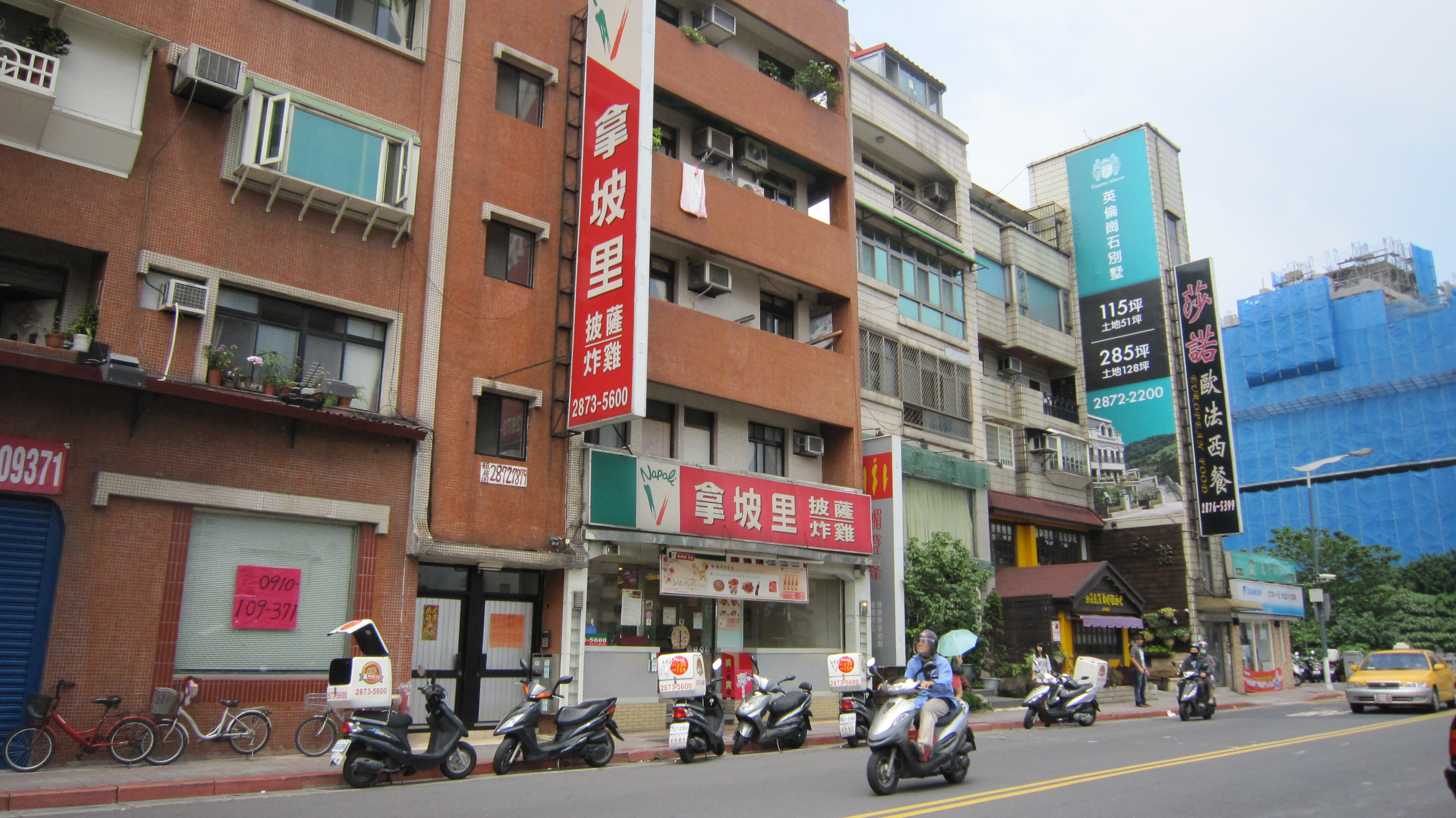
- Industry: Pizza Restaurant chain
- Founded: 1997
- Headquarters: Taipei, Taiwan
- Area served: Taiwan
- Number of employees: 1500
Napoli Pizza and Fried Chicken
- Traditional Chinese: 拿坡里披薩·炸雞
Transcriptions
Standard Mandarin
- Hanyu Pinyin: Nápōlǐ Pīsà Zhàjī
- Website: mfb.com

Napoli Pizza and Fried Chicken (Chinese: 拿坡里披薩·炸雞; pinyin: Nápōlǐ Pīsà Zhàjī) is a Taiwanese fast food restaurant chain specializing in pizza and fried chicken. It was established in 1997.

== See also ==
- Neapolitan pizza
