= Roman's Pizza =

South African fast food chain

- Industry: Restaurants
- Founded: 1993; 33 years ago
- Founders: Arthur Nicolakakis
- Headquarters: Centurion, Gauteng, South Africa
- Number of locations: 250 (2018)
- Area served: Southern Africa
- Key people: Ioannis Nicolakakis (CEO)
- Products: Pizza; Pizza Pies; Garlic Bread; Pasta; Salads
- Website: romanspizza.co.za

Roman's Pizza, sometimes simply referred to as Roman's, is a South African pizza franchise, founded in 1993, and headquartered in Centurion, Gauteng.

As of 2024, the company operates over 250 outlets across Southern Africa.

== History ==
Roman's Pizza was established by Arthur Nicolakakis in 1993, originally under the name "Little Caesar’s". In 2002, the company rebranded to Roman's Pizza.

Ioannis (John) Nicolakakis, the founder's son, joined in 2001 and later became CEO, overseeing a period of growth and operational expansion.

CEO John Nicolakakis received the Young Business Leader of the Year (Southern Africa) award at the 2015 All Africa Business Leaders Awards. In 2016, the company won Brand Builder of the Year from the Franchise Association of South Africa.

== Operations ==
The business operates on a franchising model, with store formats including both takeaway and sit-down options. Roman's Pizza has expanded to neighbouring countries, including Namibia, Botswana, and Zambia.

== Menu ==
Roman's Pizza serves pizza with a choice of pan or traditional crust. The menu includes pizza, pasta, pizza pies, garlic bread, salads, and combo offerings. A well-known sales feature is the pricing of two pizzas together as one item.

== Media coverage ==
In 2024, Roman's Pizza received the highest score in a comparative taste test of major South African pizza chains conducted by BusinessTech.

The brand has run advertising campaigns featuring South African public figures such as Barry Hilton and Alfred Ntombela.

== Controversies ==
In 2024 Romans Pizza is accused on Social Media of cleaning and reusing pizza boxes

In 2023, Romans Pizza and CEO Ioanis Nicolakakis lost high court case against former COO Basil Kassimatis and is accused of corporate bullying

In 2019, a business linked to CEO Ioanis Nicolakakis supplying cheese to Romans Pizza was accused of environmental damage

In 2019, Roman's Pizza founder Arthur Nicolakakis was involved in High Court proceedings concerning an application by his son, Ioannis Nicolakakis, and his wife, Cleo Nicolakakis, to have a curator appointed to manage his affairs. The judgment recorded Arthur's allegation that Ioannis had taken approximately R150 million in loans from the business that had not been repaid. The court did not determine the merits of the loan allegation, and the judgment dealt primarily with procedural matters relating to the curatorship application.

In 2018, a recording of CEO Ioannis (John / Yanis) Nicolakakis making remarks about competing chains was published by HuffPost South Africa.

In 2016 ASA rules against Romans Pizza for using references to Famous Brands Hot or Not Dot.

In 2015, the company paid R200,000 to settle a complaint related to franchise compliance with religious dietary guidelines.
