= Telepizza =

Spanish pizza restaurant chain

Telepizza Group S.A.
- Trade name: Telepizza
- Type: Sociedad Anónima
- Traded as: BMAD: TPZ
- Industry: Restaurant
- Founded: Madrid, Vigo (1987; 39 years ago)
- Founder: Leopoldo Fernández Pujals
- Headquarters: Madrid, Spain
- Area served: Nationwide
- Key people: Pedro Ballvé
- Products: Pizza, salads, other food products
- Website: www.telepizza.es

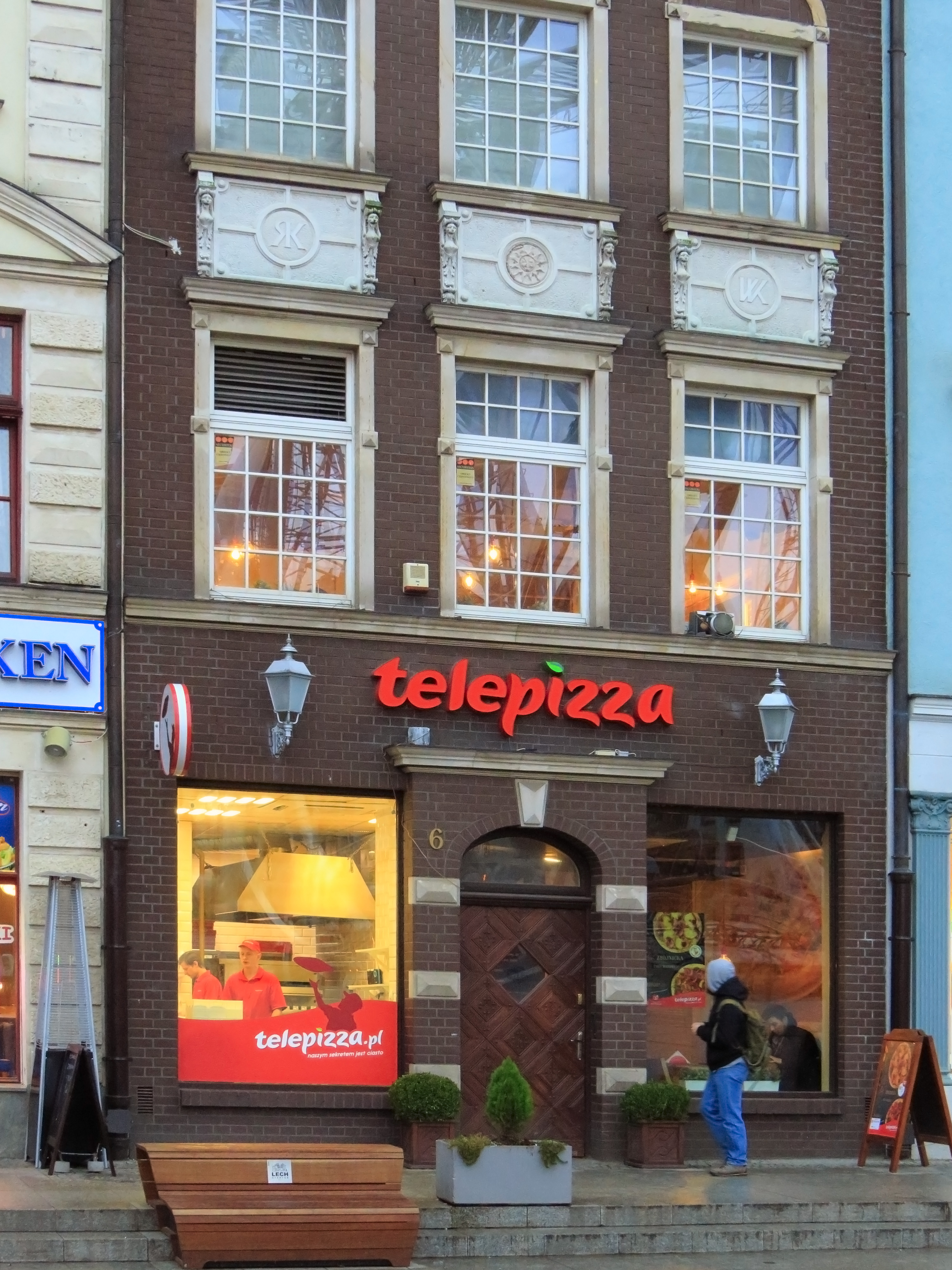
Poland Telepizza

Telepizza (Spanish pronunciation: [teleˈpitsa]) is a Spanish multinational pizza restaurant chain. As of 2017 it is the largest pizza chain not originating in North America by number of stores.

== History ==
=== 1980s: Foundation ===
Telepizza was founded as "Pizza Phone" in 1987 by Leopoldo Fernández Pujals, a Cuban-born American businessman, in Madrid's El Pilar neighbourhood.

=== 1990s: Expansion ===
By 1995 Telepizza had 200 locations in Spain with a 52% market share. The company had factories in the Spanish cities of Guadalajara, Barcelona, Móstoles, and Alcobendas, but those were later sold and all production was moved to a factory in Daganzo de Arriba, Madrid. The pizza base is distributed from the factories to the different stores.

Leopoldo Fernández was forced to pawn his house, take out loans, and even endure an October 1995 "board coup" orchestrated by his brother Eduardo and other minority shareholders, which led to his removal as chairman. By late June 1996, he returned to lead Telepizza with the backing of BBVA, then the company's third-largest shareholder.

On November 13, 1996, the company went public, becoming the first in its sector to list on the Spanish stock exchange. At the time, Telepizza was the leader in home-delivered pizza, with 233 outlets in Spain and a presence in Andorra, Portugal, Poland, Cuba, Chile, Mexico, Guatemala, El Salvador, Morocco, and Iran.

Throughout 1999, Leopoldo Fernández gradually sold his stake in the company, triggering a cumulative 44.64% decline in shares. On October 22, he sold his remaining 30.25% stake (over 10 million shares) off-market at a 15% discount, pocketing 50 billion pesetas. Hours earlier, trading was suspended by the National Securities Market Commission (CNMV) due to a leaked announcement.

=== 2000s: Pujals left ===
Control of the company shifted to Pedro Ballvé (Campofrío Food Group) and José Carlos Olcese (TeleChef, itself controlled by Campofrío). Pujals justified his abrupt departure by stating: “To dedicate himself fully to the cause of defending Human Rights and to ensure that this activity would never negatively impact Telepizza.”

=== 2010s: More than 1000 restaurants ===
In 2010, Telepizza had 1025 outlets worldwide; thereof 603 stores in Spain and 422 in markets such as Portugal, the United Kingdom, Peru, Chile, Poland, Russia, Central America, the United Arab Emirates, Saudi Arabia, and Iran.

In 2010, Telepizza bought the Colombian chain Jeno's Pizza.

In 2011, Telepizza began operations in Peru, owned by its Chilean subsidiary. Delosi, a local company that also operates Pizza Hut restaurants in the country since 1983, acquired all of the company's local operations in mid-2019. Following an eight-year run, the restaurant ceased operations in October 2019.

In April 2016, Telepizza completed an IPO reported to be valued at euro 550 million. Prior to its IPO, the company was owned by the founding Ballvé family and private equity fund Permira.

In 2017, it opened its first establishment in the United Kingdom. In July 2017, the company opened its first store in Iran and with projections to open two more in December of the same year. Since November 2017, Telepizza opened its two stores in Paraguay.

=== 2020s: Exit from Chile ===
In 2023, Telepizza decided not to renew the Master Franchise contract with Pollo Campero in Guatemala and El Salvador, and the operations began to run under the name Pizza Campero. A similar situation occurred in Bolivia, where Telepizza's operations in that country were rebranded as Tpizza.

In January 2025, Telepizza announced the closure of its operations in Chile after 29 years in the country. This was due to economic, competitive and financial reasons that hindered its projection as a pizza chain throughout the territory.
