= Kro's Nest =

Pizza restaurant chain in Beijing, China

Beijing Kro’s Nest F&B Management
- Traditional Chinese: 北京烏巢餐飲管理有限公司
- Simplified Chinese: 北京乌巢餐饮管理有限公司
Transcriptions
Standard Mandarin
- Hanyu Pinyin: Běijīng Wū Cháo Cānyǐn Guǎnlǐ Yǒuxiàngōngsī

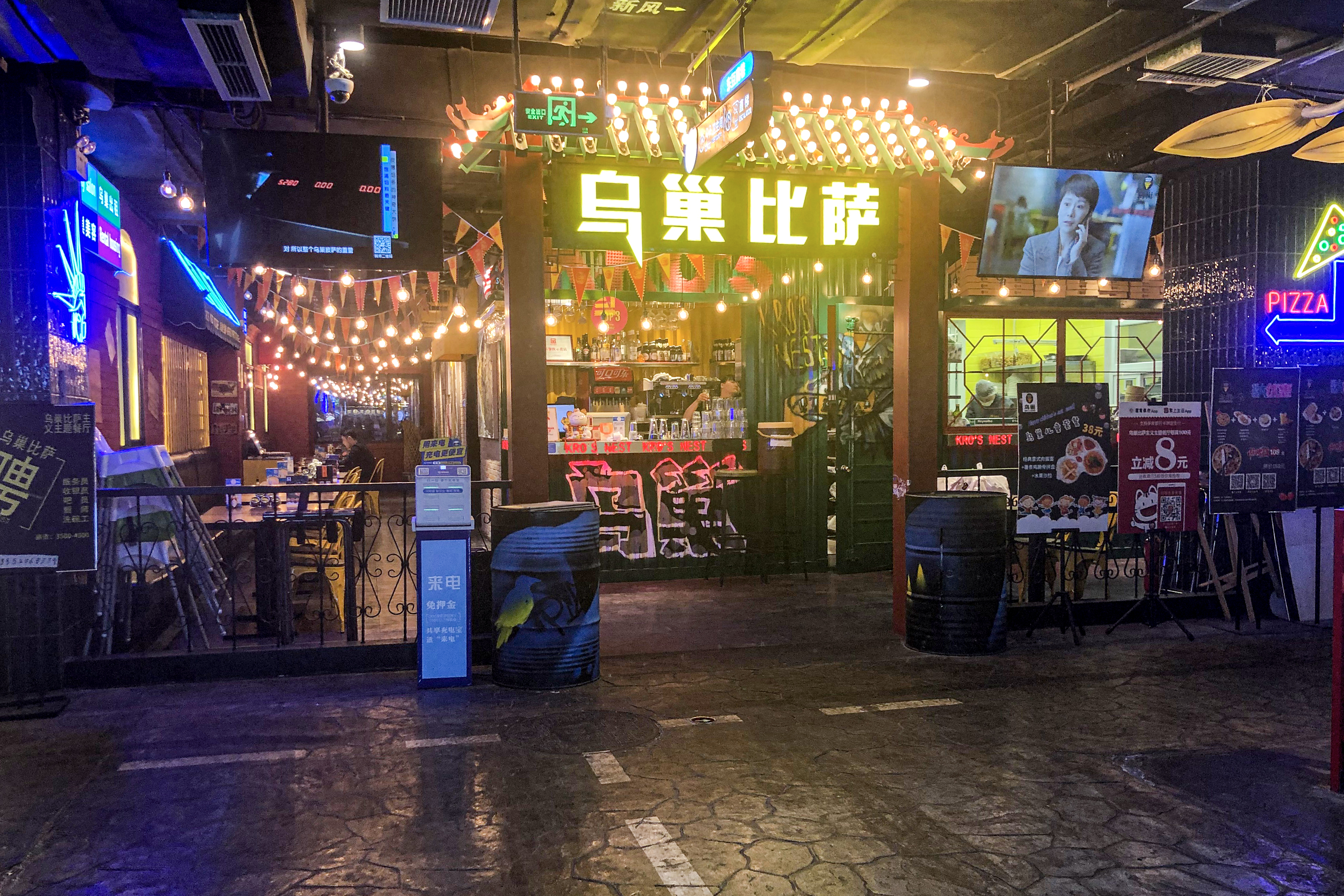
The Kro's Nest restaurant at Beijing West railway station

Kro's Nest (simplified Chinese: 乌巢; traditional Chinese: 烏巢; pinyin: Wū Cháo) is a chain of pizza restaurants in Beijing operated by Beijing Kro's Nest F&B Management, headquartered in Chaoyang District.

Christopher Beam of Bloomberg Businessweek stated that the chain was "known for its American-style pies". Susie Gordon, author of Moon Spotlight Beijing, wrote that the "reliable Western menu" gave the chain popularity.

As of 2013 Marty Handley is the vice president of the chain.

== History ==
The restaurant chain was first established in 2005. The notable figures were an American, Olav Kristoffer "Kro" Bauer, and his Chinese business partner, Yuan Jie (袁 捷; Yuán Jié). Bauer and Yuan Jie had been business partners in previous ventures. At the time Bauer, a graduate of the University of Hawaiʻi at Mānoa, was 21 years old. The first restaurant opened in the area around Peking University.

In 2006 Bauer and Yuan Jie had a dispute regarding a recipe, but the two later reconciled. China Central Television (CCTV) covered this dispute.

Bauer and Yuan Jie later became involved in a dispute over the ownership of the restaurant chain. In 2010 the two were involved in a physical altercation that resulted in Yuan Jie's arrest. The management of the chain was altered after 2010. Three locations owned by Yuan Jie were renamed to "Tube Station Pizza"; they were in Haidian District, the North Third Ring Road area, and the Beijing Workers' Stadium area.
