= Hong Kong Outstanding Students Awards =

Hong Kong Outstanding Students Award
- Awarded for: Recognizing outstanding academic, extra-curricular, and community service achievements, and morality among students in Hong Kong
- Location: Hong Kong
- Established: 1985

The Hong Kong Outstanding Students Award (Chinese: 香港傑出學生選舉) is a student contest in Hong Kong. The Award aims to encourage promising students with outstanding academic, extra-curricular and community service achievements, and morality.

From 1985 to 2010, the Award was organised by the Lion & Globe Educational Trust and co-organised by the Outstanding Young Persons' Association. Starting from 2011, the Award has been organised by the Youth Arch Foundation and co-organised by the Outstanding Young Persons' Association. Every year, about ten secondary school students from local and international schools in Hong Kong are selected to be the "Hong Kong Outstanding Students".

== History ==
The Award began in 1985 as the "Hong Kong Outstanding Female Students Award", which only accepted applications from female students; it was opened to male students in 1987. Over the first 25 years, the Award had been organised by Doreen Leung, the first female recipient of the Outstanding Young Persons of the World. Since Leung died in 2009, a group of past winners and finalists of the Award founded the Youth Arch Foundation in 2010, succeeding to the role of Leung as the event organiser of the Awards.

== Judging criteria ==
- Outstanding academic performance
- Achievements in extra-curricular activities
- Exceptional personal qualities
- Outstanding character
- Commitment to contribute to society
- Leadership potential

== Selection process ==
Before 2011, applicants first needed to sit for a written test that comprised questions from disciplines including languages, mathematics, logic, science, history, geography, and current issues. 40 finalists would be selected to participate in a group interview, after which 10 or 11 winners would be selected.

Since 2011, applicants, as the first step, are required to take a written test of similar format. Candidates are short-listed to participate in a two-day camp which aims to assess applicants’ inter-personal skills and leadership potential. 20 students are then selected to enter the panel interview round. Finally, 10 winners are chosen based on their performance in all stages.

Subsequently, the Youth Arch Foundation further revamped the selection process for the Award. In addition to the previous assessment processes, finalists will be invited to participate in the Enrichment Program during the summer break. This program will help them enhance themselves, broaden their horizons, and develop their strengths. Participants will have the chance to engage in in-depth discussions with renowned figures, community leaders, various organisations, as well as outstanding students from previous years and other schools. During the sharing session for finalists, they will have the opportunity to share their learning achievements and experiences from the summer break.

== Prizes ==
All awardees and finalists of the Award are invited to join a four-day summer leadership training camp. Starting from 2011, winners of the Award will be invited to partake in a study tour. In 2013 and 2014, awardees went on an experiential learning and cycling trip in Cambodia. In 2015, students participated in a service learning and environmental trip in Sumatra, where they were guided to produce environmental-themed videos.

From 2016, awardees visited different places such as Guangxi, Sri Lanka, Chiang Mai, Hua Hin for the service learning trip. During these trips, they engaged in cultural exchanges with the locals and contributed to the community through activities such as teaching and repairing community facilities. They embodied the spirit of "Giving is Outstanding" through their dedicated service.

== Other awards ==
In 2009, Doreen Leung died. In memory of her, Youth Arch Foundation set up the Doreen Leung Memorial Service Award in 2010 to uphold her selfless spirit of serving the community.

The awardee is selected according to their community service records, as well as voting result among the nominees. Chung To, a social leader and Chi Heng Foundation Founder and chairperson, will be the mentor of the awardee for a year.

== Hong Kong Outstanding Students' Association ==
The winners and finalists of the Award founded the Hong Kong Outstanding Students' Association (HKOSA) in 1987, a student-run organization. All winners and finalists of the Award are automatically enrolled to HKOSA once they are shortlisted to enter the final interview round.

The organization has initiated a number of creative and innovative projects that aim to inspire other secondary school students in different ways. Some of the regular activities organized include the annual Leadership Interflow Camp since 1991, the Volunteer Training Scheme since 1998, the Hong Kong Youth Summit, a forum for students to discuss current issues, since 2003, and the International Convergence, which is a multi-cultural experience scheme, since 2005. These activities typically attract participation of over 100 students from different secondary schools.

HKOSA is supported by a group of honorary advisors, which include consuls general, university presidents and government officials. The advisor list in 2022–23 includes:

- Mr Andrew Leung (梁君彥), President of the Legislative Council of Hong Kong
- Ms Christine Choi (蔡若蓮), Secretary for Education
- Prof Xiang Zhang (張翔), President and Vice-chancellor of the University of Hong Kong
- Prof Rocky Tuan (段崇智), President and Vice-chancellor of The Chinese University of Hong Kong
- Prof Stephen Cheung (張仁良), former President of the Education University of Hong Kong
- Michael Tien (田北辰), member of the Legislative Council of Hong Kong

== Schools by number of Outstanding Student Award winners ==
Rank	School	No. of Winners
1	Diocesan Girls' School	54
2	Queen's College	22
2	St. Mary's Canossian College	22
2	German Swiss International School	22
5	Diocesan Boys' School	19
6	St. Paul's Convent School	18
7	Maryknoll Convent School	16
7	St. Paul's Co-educational College	16
9	Tsuen Wan Government Secondary School	14
9	St. Joseph's College	14
11	St. Stephen's Girls' College	12
12	La Salle College	9
13	NT Heung Yee Kuk Yuen Long District Secondary School	8
14	Sacred Heart Canossian College	7
14	Marymount Secondary School	7
14	Heep Yunn School	7
17	Sha Tin Government Secondary School	6
18	Madam Lau Kam Lung Secondary School of MFBM	5
18	Queen Elizabeth School	5
18	Wah Yan College, Hong Kong	5
18	South Tuen Mun Government Secondary School	5
18	SKH Lam Woo Memorial Secondary School	5
18	St. Paul's Secondary School	5
24	SKH Bishop Mok Sau Tseng Secondary School	4
24	Ying Wa College	4
26	St. Francis' Canossian College	3
26	Wa Ying College	3
26	Ho Fung College	3
29	Clementi Middle School	2
29	King's College	2
29	Pope Paul VI College	2
29	Pui Ching Middle School	2
29	Christian Alliance S C Chan Memorial College	2
29	Shung Tak Catholic English College	2
29	St. Paul's School (Lam Tin)	2
29	True Light Girls' College	2
29	Tsuen Wan Public Ho Chuen Yiu Memorial College	2
29	Kwun Tong Maryknoll College	2
29	Victoria Shanghai Academy	2
29	Rosaryhill School	2
29	Po Leung Kuk Tang Yuk Tien Secondary School	2
29	Bishop Hall Jubliee School	2
29	St. Rose of Lima's College	2
29	Li Po Chun United World College of Hong Kong	2
29	Good Hope School	2
29	King George V School	2
29	Po Leung Kuk Choi Kai Yau School	2
29	Singapore International School (Hong Kong)	2
29	Hong Kong University Graduate Association College	2
29	Sha Tin College	2
51	Baptist Lui Ming Choi Secondary School	1
51	CCC Chuen Yuen College	1
51	CCC Ming Kei College	1
51	Heung To Middle School	1
51	Holy Trinity College	1
51	Homantin Government Secondary School	1
51	Hong Kong International School	1
51	Kwun Tong Government Secondary School	1
51	Maryknoll Fathers' School	1
51	N.T.H.Y.K. Yuen Long District Secondary School	1
51	Po Leung Kuk Centenary Li Shiu Chung Memorial College	1
51	Po Leung Kuk CFA No. 1 College	1
51	Raimondi College	1
51	Shun Lee Catholic Secondary School	1
51	Sing Yin Secondary School	1
51	SKH Tsang Shiu Tim Secondary School	1
51	St. Catharine's School for Girls	1
51	St. Francis of Assisi College	1
51	St. Mark's School	1
51	St. Stephen's Church College	1
51	St. Stephen's College	1
51	Tang Shiu Kin Victoria Technical School	1
51	Tuen Mun Catholic Secondary School	1
51	TWGH Wong Fut Nam College	1
51	Wah Yan College, Kowloon	1
51	Yew Chung International School of Hong Kong	1
51	Ying Wa Girls' School	1
51	Yuen Long Merchants Association Secondary School	1
51	Yuen Long Public Secondary School	1

== Notable winners and finalists ==
Many winners and finalists of the Award achieved excellent results in the Hong Kong Certificate of Education Examination, with a number of them obtaining 10As and 9As. Many were admitted to universities such as Ivy League institutions and Oxbridge. Up to 2016, the alumni base of the Award (commonly known as “OSArs”) has reached over 1100 people. Many of them now work in fields including government, business, law, medicine, entertainment, education, architecture, journalism, and engineering.

Some of the notable winners and finalists are:

- Stephanie Au Hoi-shun (歐鎧淳), four-time Olympic swimmer; holder of 11 Hong Kong's long and short course (freestyle) records
- Mung Chiang (蔣濛), Arthur LeGrand Doty Professor of Electrical Engineering, Director of the Keller Center, Princeton University, 2013 Alan T. Waterman Award recipient
- Cheong Leong (張亮), executive director, Charities and Community, The Hong Kong Jockey Club, and chairman and CEO of RunOurCity, an innovative social enterprise he co-founded with the aim of transforming life through running. He has been an honorary advisor and director of Social Ventures Hong Kong, a pioneer venture philanthropic fund, since its inception in 2007.
- Poman Lo (羅寶文) CEO and Founder of Century Innovative Technology Limited (CITL). She is also the Vice Chairman of Century City International Holdings Limited and Regal Hotels International Holdings Limited and an executive director of Paliburg Holdings Limited and managing director of Regal Portfolio Management Limited.
- Perry So (蘇柏軒), Assistant Conductor of Hong Kong Philharmonic Orchestra; Youngest winner at 5th International Prokofiev Conducting Competition
- Joey Wat (屈翠容), CEO of Yum China
