= Sisters of Saint Paul of Chartres =

Roman Catholic religious congregation for women

Congregation of the Sisters of St. Paul of Chartres
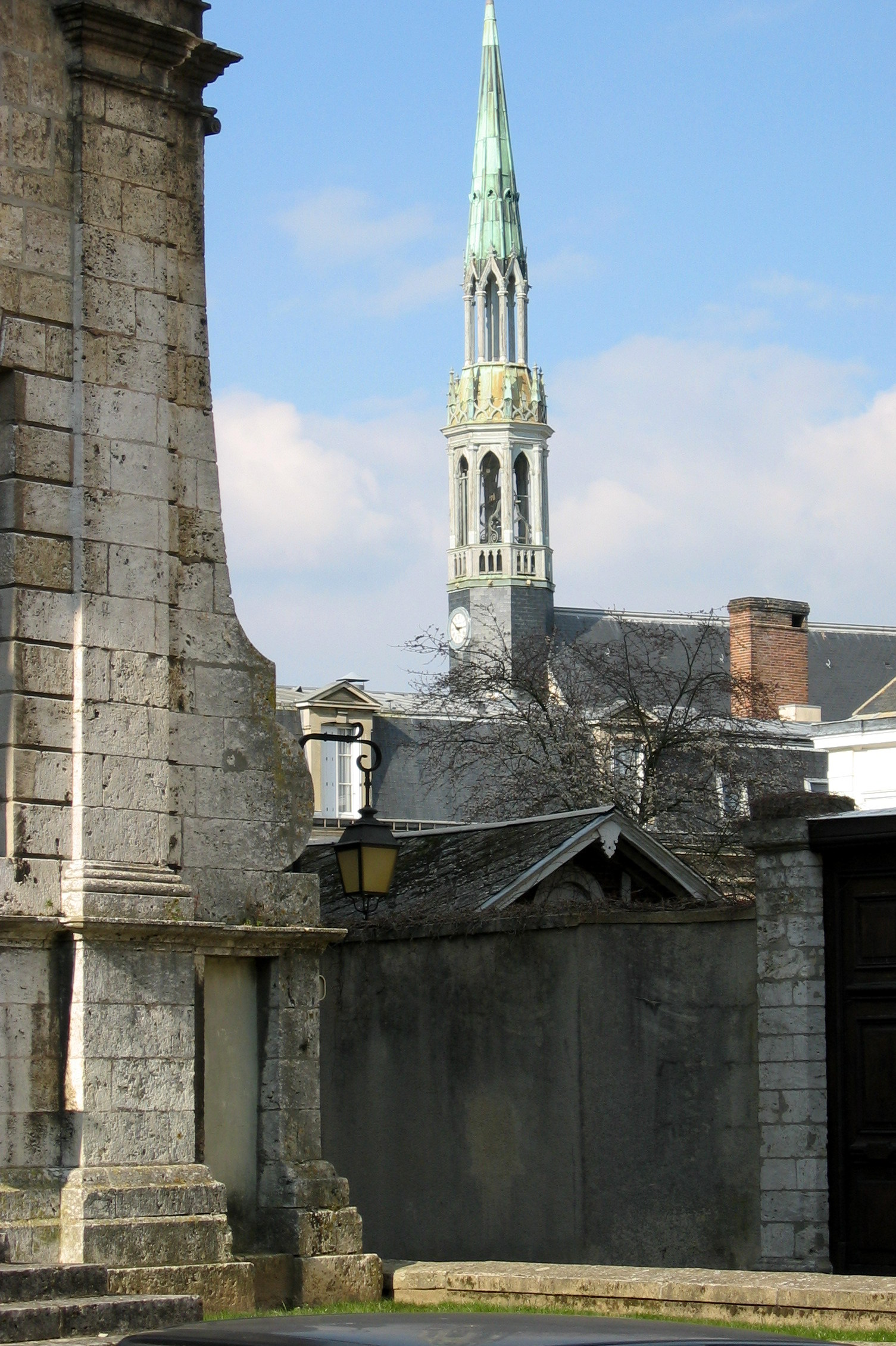
- Motherhouse in Chartres
- Abbreviation: SPC (post-nominal initials)
- Formation: 1696; 330 years ago
- Founders: Louis Chauvet
- Founded at: Levesville-la-Chenard France
- Type: Religious apostolic missionary congregation of pontifical right
- Headquarters: Generalate; Via della Vignaccia, 193 Rome Italy
- Coordinates: 41°54′4.9″N 12°27′38.2″E
- Members: 4,000+
- Superior General: Mother Joanna Marie Cheung
- Patron saint: Paul the Apostle
- Website: https://stpaulrome.com/

The Congregation of the Sisters of St. Paul of Chartres (SPC) is a Roman Catholic religious apostolic missionary congregation of pontifical right for teaching, nursing, visiting the poor and taking care of orphans, the old and infirm, and the mentally ill. It was founded in Levesville-la-Chenard, France, in 1696.

The interior spirit is a love of sacrifice and labor for the spiritual and temporal good of others.

== History ==
In 1696, the congregation was founded by Louis Chauvet, the parish priest of Levesville-la-Chenard, a little French village, and Marie-Anne de Tilly, a young woman from a noble family. Chauvet enlisted three volunteers. Their first house belonged to Chauvet.

The first superior, Marie Michau, died in 1702, She was succeeded by Marie-Anne de Tilly, who died the following year. In 1708 the small community of sister was entrusted to the Bishop of Chartres, Paul Godet des Marais. The bishop gave them a small house and the Apostle Paul as a patron. The house formerly belonged to a sabot-maker, and this gave them the name of "les Sœurs sabotières de Saint-Maurice", by which they were originally known.

In 1727, the sisters were asked by Louis XV to establish a foreign mission at Cayenne in French Guiana. The congregation was dispersed under the Terror, during the French Revolution, but was restored by Napoleon I, who gave the sisters a monastery at Chartres, which originally belonged to the Jacobins, from which they became known as "les Sœurs de St. Jacques".

=== Beyond France ===
The sisters expanded their missionary work to the Islands of Martinique in 1818. They settled in England in 1847 at the invitation of Cardinal Wiseman.

By 1902 they had over two hundred and fifty houses in France where, besides various kinds of schools, they undertook asylums for the blind, the aged, and the insane, hospitals, dispensaries, and crèches. By 1913, more than one hundred and sixty of these schools had been closed, also thirty of the hospitals, military and civil, in the French colonies, three convents at Blois and a hospice at Brie. On the other hand they had in the meanwhile opened five or six hospitals overseas.

In 1904, seven sisters came to the Philippines from Saigon, Vietnam at the invitation of Frederick Z. Rooker, bishop of Jaro. They opened a girls' boarding school in Dumaguete. Over time, they developed St. Paul University System, which became known for training nurses.

=== Hong Kong ===
The first Sisters of St. Paul de Chartres arrived in Hong Kong in 1848. Institutions founded by the sisters include:

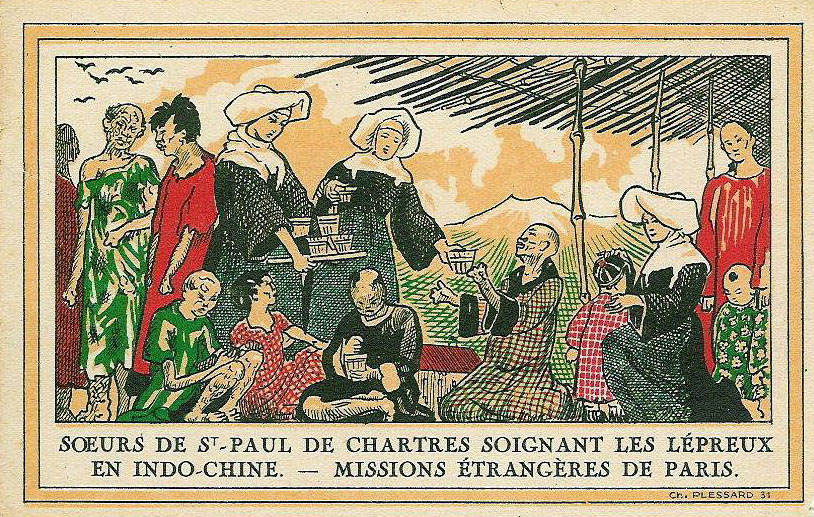
Sisters of Saint Paul of Chartres in Indochina in 1931.

- St. Paul's Convent School
- St. Paul's Secondary School
- St. Paul's School (Lam Tin)
- St. Paul's Hospital (Hong Kong)
- St. Teresa's Hospital

== Core values ==
- 1. Christ - Christ is the CENTER of a Paulinian's life; s/he follows and imitates Christ, doing everything in reference to Him.
- 2. Charity - urged on by the LOVE OF CHRIST, the Paulinian is warm, loving, hospitable and "all to all", especially to the underprivileged.
- 3. Charism - the Paulinian develops his/her GIFTS/TALENTS to for the service of the community, s/he strives to grow and improve daily, always seeking the better and finer things, and the Final Good.
- 4. Commission - the Paulinian has a mission - a LIFE PURPOSE to spread the Good News; like Christ, s/he actively works to save" this world, and to make it a better place.
- 5. Community - the Paulinian is a RESPONSIBLE FAMILY MEMBER and CITIZEN, concerned with building communities, promotion of peoples, justice and peace, and the protection of the environment.

== See also ==
- Paulists
- Sisters of Charity
- Mère Benjamin
