= Little Sheep Group =

Chinese hot pot restaurant

Little Sheep Group Limited
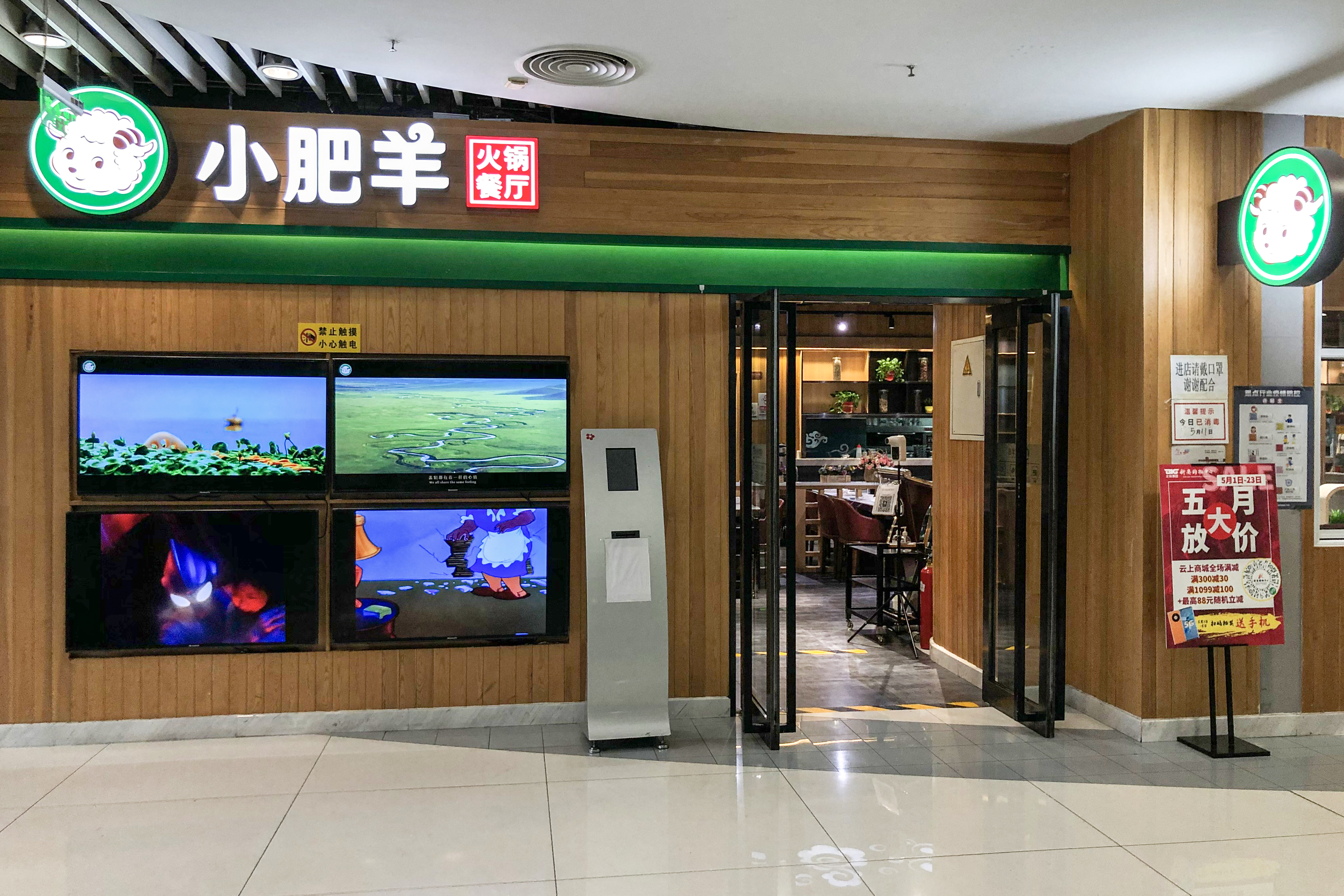
- Little Sheep restaurant at Xin'ao Shopping Center
- Native name: 小肥羊餐饮连锁有限公司
- Type: Subsidiary
- Industry: Hospitality
- Founded: 1999; 27 years ago
- Headquarters: Baotou, Inner Mongolia, China
- Area served: China; United States; Canada; Japan; Indonesia; Mongolia
- Key people: Zhang Gang (chairman); Chen Hongkai (deputy chairman)
- Products: Hot pot
- Parent: Yum China

Chinese name
- Simplified Chinese: 小肥羊餐饮连锁有限公司
- Traditional Chinese: 小肥羊餐飲連鎖有限公司
Transcriptions
Standard Mandarin
- Hanyu Pinyin: Xiǎo Féi Yáng Cānyǐn Liánsuǒ Yǒuxiàngōngsī
- Website: www.littlesheep.com

Little Sheep Group Limited is a Chinese restaurant company that was founded in 1999 in Baotou, Inner Mongolia. The company specializes in operating hot pot restaurants, condiments, and meat processing.

Little Sheep currently has over 300 restaurant chains in China, Hong Kong, Taiwan, Macau, the United States, Japan, and Canada. In 2007, Little Sheep was named the most popular Chinese hot pot restaurant by the Chinese Restaurant Association. It was subsequently listed on the Hong Kong Stock Exchange in 2008. It became China's first branded catering enterprise listed in Hong Kong.

Little Sheep posted ¥2 billion in revenues in 2010, which accounted for two percent of dining-out receipts in China.

In 2011, Little Sheep was sold to Yum! Brands Inc, a U.S.-based fast-food franchise conglomerate. Yum agreed to buy Little Sheep for $587 million in May 2011 but the deal was delayed for four months by a Chinese Ministry of Commerce antitrust investigation. Little Sheep was delisted from the Hong Kong Exchange in February 2012. In 2016, Yum! Brands spun off their Chinese operations into Yum China, which includes Little Sheep. Happy Lamb was also a similar hot pot brand founded by the original owner of Little Sheep in 2017.

== History ==
Little Sheep was founded by Zhang Gang. There are two versions of the company's founding in Baotou. According to one story, Zhang Gang, who was busy running a telecommunications business, developed a habit of eating hot pot with friends rather than cooking; this gave him the idea to open a hot pot restaurant. Another version of the story is that Zhang Gang observed the commercial success of a chain of three hot pot restaurants in Hohhot; convinced of the business potential of the hot pot restaurant format, he purchased hot-pot-based recipes and began to develop Little Sheep.

On August 8, 1999, the first Little Sheep outlet of the Inner Mongolia Little Sheep Catering Chain Co., Ltd. was opened in Baotou City.

== Development ==
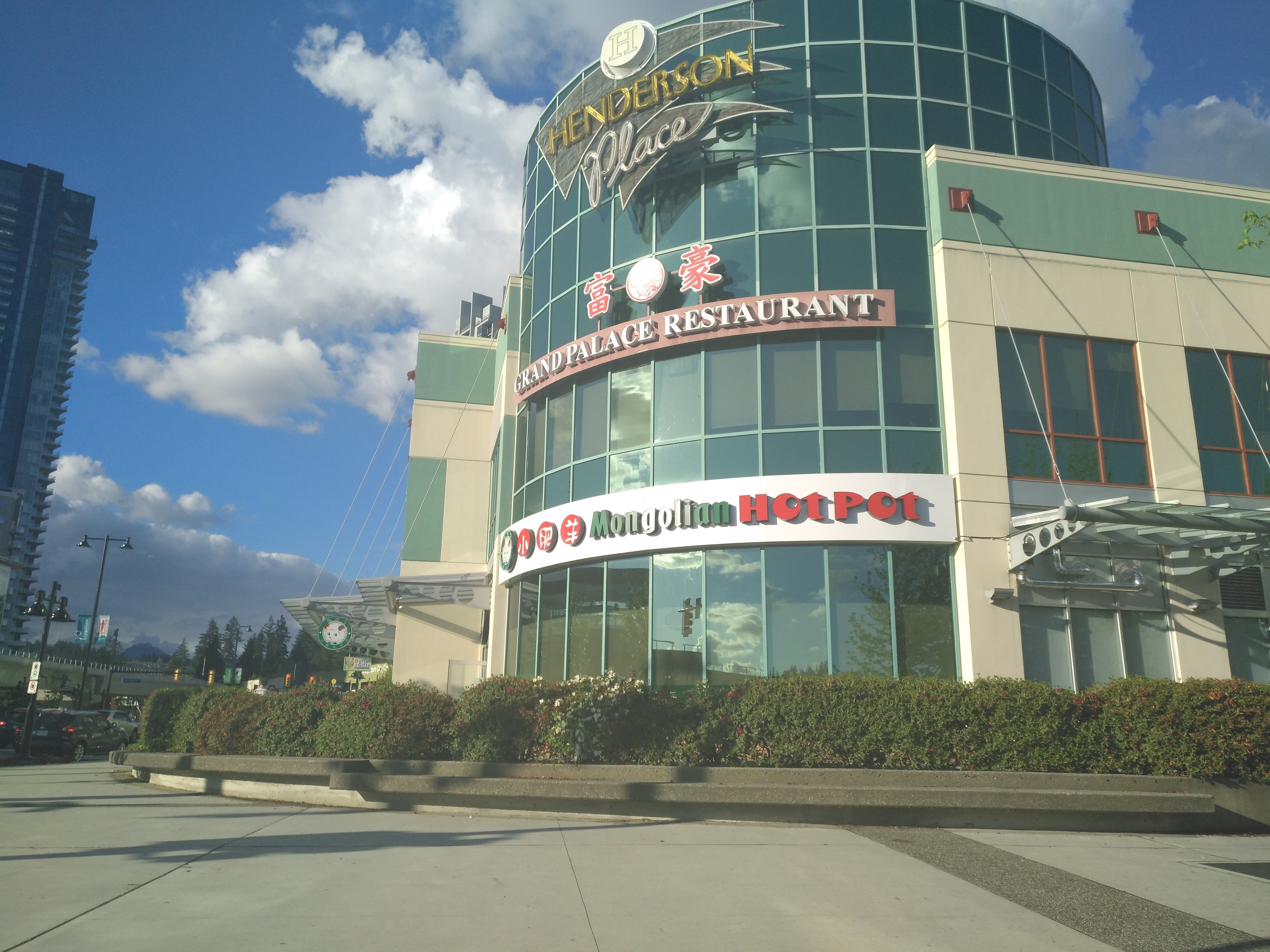
A Little Sheep outlet in Coquitlam, Canada

Due to the good operation of the first Little Sheep restaurant, founders successfully opened two Little Sheep Hot Pot restaurants in Qingshan District and Donghe District of Baotou City two months later, and the business was equally popular. This allowed the founders of Little Sheep to start the chain-store operation. They started opening more Little Sheep restaurants in other countries as well as of April 2000. In early 2001, the Little Sheep meat product processing base was established.

In May 2001, Shanghai branch of Inner Mongolia Little Sheep Catering Chain Co., Ltd. was established (there are currently 30 direct investment restaurants).

In January 2002, the Beijing branch of Inner Mongolia Little Sheep Catering Chain Co., Ltd. was established (there are currently 15 direct investment restaurants).

In January 2002, Shenzhen branch of Inner Mongolia Little Sheep Catering Chain Co., Ltd. was established (there are currently 18 direct investment restaurants).

In November 2002, Little Sheep Hot pot Store was opened in Chengdu, and entered the most competitive hot pot market in China, therefore challenging Sichuan hot pot brands. It achieved an income record of 170,000 yuan in one day.

In January 2003, the Little Sheep Condiment Base was established.

In November 2003, Little Sheep's first overseas chain store opened in Los Angeles, U.S.

In September 2004, Inner Mongolia Little Sheep Catering Chain Co., Ltd. ranked among the Top 500 Chinese companies.

On November 12, 2004, "LITTLE SHEEP" and its logo were recognized as China's Famous Trade Mark.

On October 12, 2005, the first directly operated store was opened in Toronto, Canada.

In June 2006, it was again selected as "China's 500 Most Valuable Brands" with a brand value of 5.677 billion Yuan.

On June 22, 2007, Little Sheep was selected for the third time as the "China's 500 Most Valuable Brands" and was ranked in 104th place in the Top 500 Chinese companies with a brand value of 5.916 billion Yuan.

On November 11, 2007, at the fourth annual Top 100 Chinese Restaurant Awards in New York, U.S., it won three honours: Chinese Best 100 Local Cuisine, Chinese Best 100 New Restaurant, and Chinese Best 100 Healthy Cuisine.

On June 12, 2008, Inner Mongolia Little Sheep Catering Chain Co., Ltd. was successfully listed in Hong Kong.

Until January 2010, Little Sheep Company had a total of more than 60,000 employees, drove more than 240,000 people in related employment, and increased more than 200,000 farmers and herdsmen's income.

== Acquisition by Yum! Brands ==
On May 13, 2011, Yum! Brands announced it intended to acquire Little Sheep Group Co., Ltd. at a premium of approximately 30% in cash. After the acquisition, Little Sheep Group would be delisted from the Hong Kong Stock Exchange. The transaction was approved by relevant regulatory agencies such as China's Ministry of Commerce. Because Yum! Brands and Little Sheep Group are relatively large, according to the law, this transaction was subject to China's anti-monopoly.

After the acquisition in February 2012, Yum! Brands held approximately 93.2% of the shares of Little Sheep, the rest of which were owned by Zhang Gang and other founders. Yujing Su, chairman and chief executive officer of Yum! Brands' China Department, said, "Yum! Brands will use its extensive experience in operating restaurants to further enhance the brand's value and influence of Little Sheep, in order to make Little Sheep a strong leader in the Chinese hot pot market." Zhang Gang was also confident Little Sheep would have a bright future in the international market.

== Current situation ==
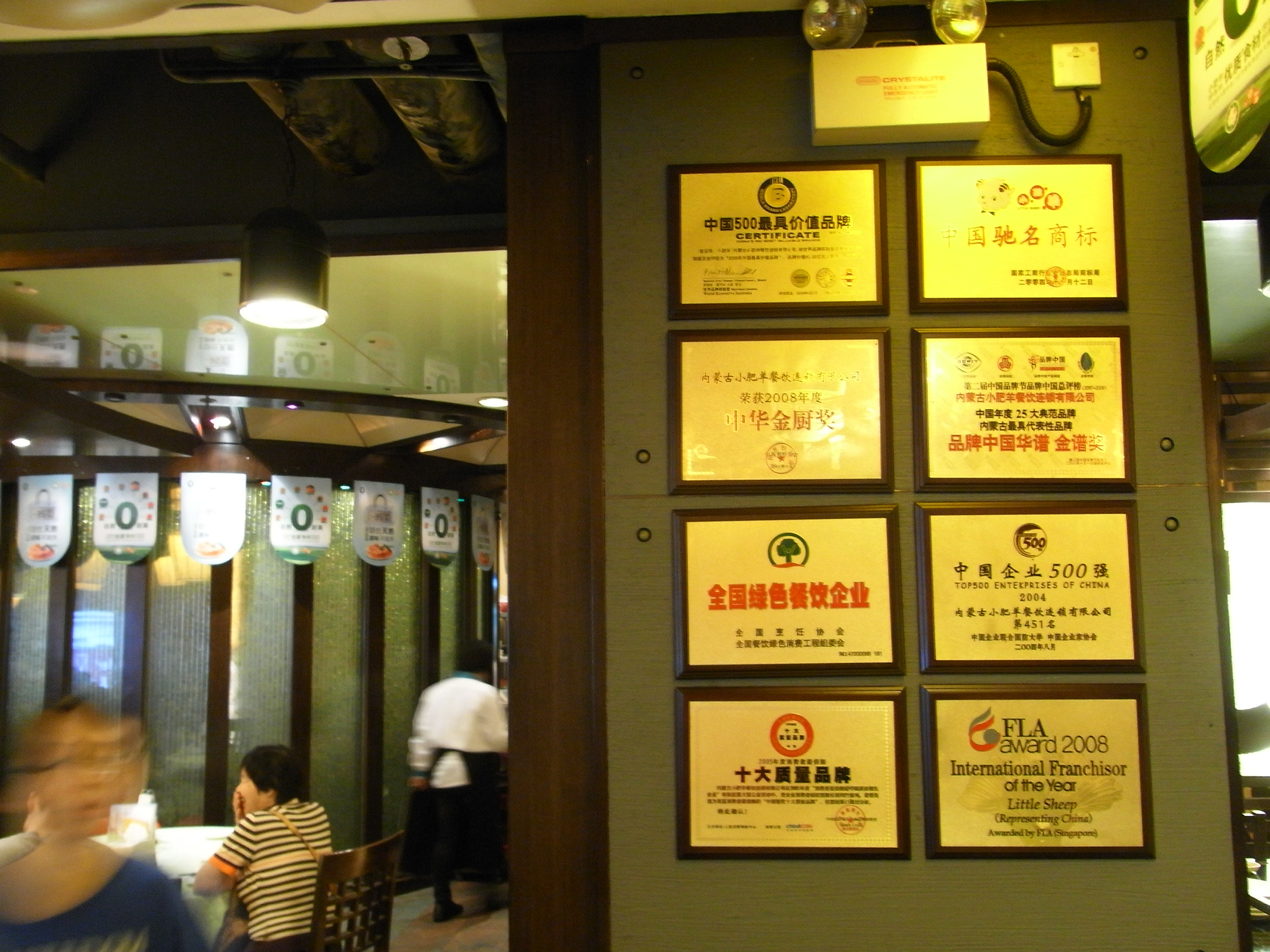
Little Sheep's Honor

Yum! Brands' management system is different from Little Sheep's original management system. Because of the difference, many managers quit. Yum! Brands closed many poorly managed and poorly located stores without many commercial interests. When Little Sheep was at its peak, there were more than 720 restaurants. Yum! Brands wanted to reduce this number and focus on high-potential outlets. After the cull, fewer than 200 restaurants remained open.

With the rapid development of the catering industry, especially the hot pot market, the traditional marketing model can no longer meet the needs of its future development. Little Sheep, as the leader of hot pot restaurant chains, tried to develop its online marketing approach.

=== Happy Lamb ===
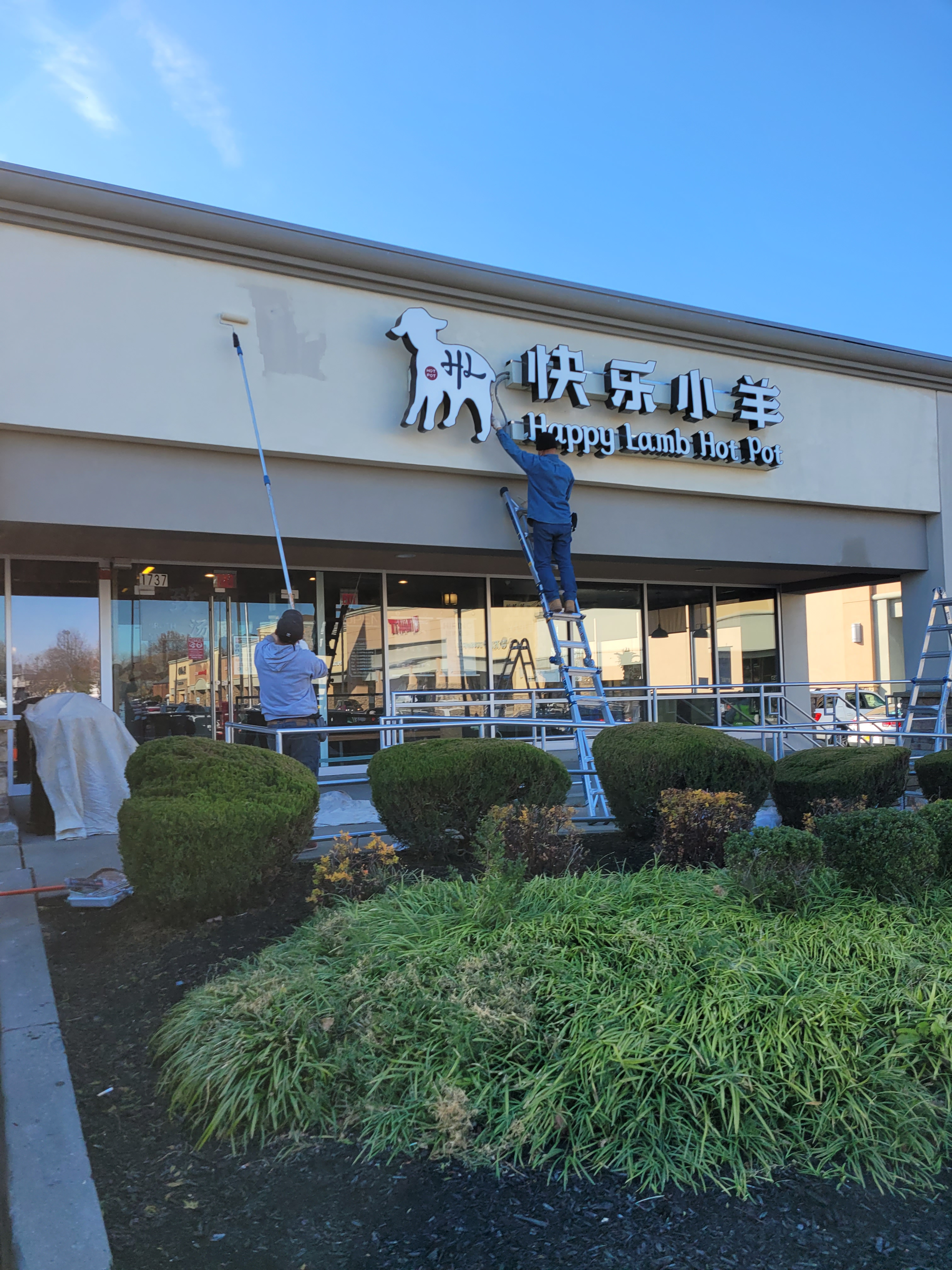
A Happy Lamb restaurant in Edison, New Jersey, United States

Zhang Gang, the founder of Little Sheep Group, re-founded the hot pot brand "Happy Lamb" (快乐小羊) in 2017 due to the dissatisfaction of the new business philosophies of "Little Sheep" under Yum! Brands's ownership. Most of the "Little Sheep"'s overseas restaurants were rebranded as "Happy Lamb".

== Company culture ==
The goal of Little Sheep Company is to deepen the new food method of "simmering lamb without dipping in complex ingredients". The Little Sheep brand has a good reputation among consumers in China.

== Cooking method ==
Instant-boiled mutton, a style of hot pot, has been eaten in China for a long time, but traditionally it's prepared in boiling water and the pieces of meat are dipped in sauce by each diner after cooking. Because the smell of raw lamb is not accepted by southerners in China, the consumption of lamb and mutton is regional. "Little Sheep" invented a method of "simmering mutton without dipped in ingredients": a pot-base soup made from dozens of condiments. By changing cumbersome ingredients, this method removes the smell of lamb while retaining its flavour. This method is more convenient than the tradition of "instant-boiled mutton".

== Meat quality ==
Meat for "Little Sheep" is sourced from Inner Mongolia grassland, the Xilinguole grassland (锡林郭勒草原), which produces Mongolian sheep, such as the "Wuzhumuqin sheep (乌珠穆沁羊)", "Sunite sheep (苏尼特羊)", and the "Wulatetan sheep (乌拉特滩羊)". Only six-month-old lamb is selected, because the meat is fresh and tender rather than smelly or stale.

== Menu ==
The Little Sheep serves lamb, beef, and other specials. Mongolian wine is served at Little Sheep.

== See also ==
- Chinese restaurant
- List of Chinese restaurants
- Haidilao
