= Sing Yin Secondary School =

Secondary school in Hong Kong

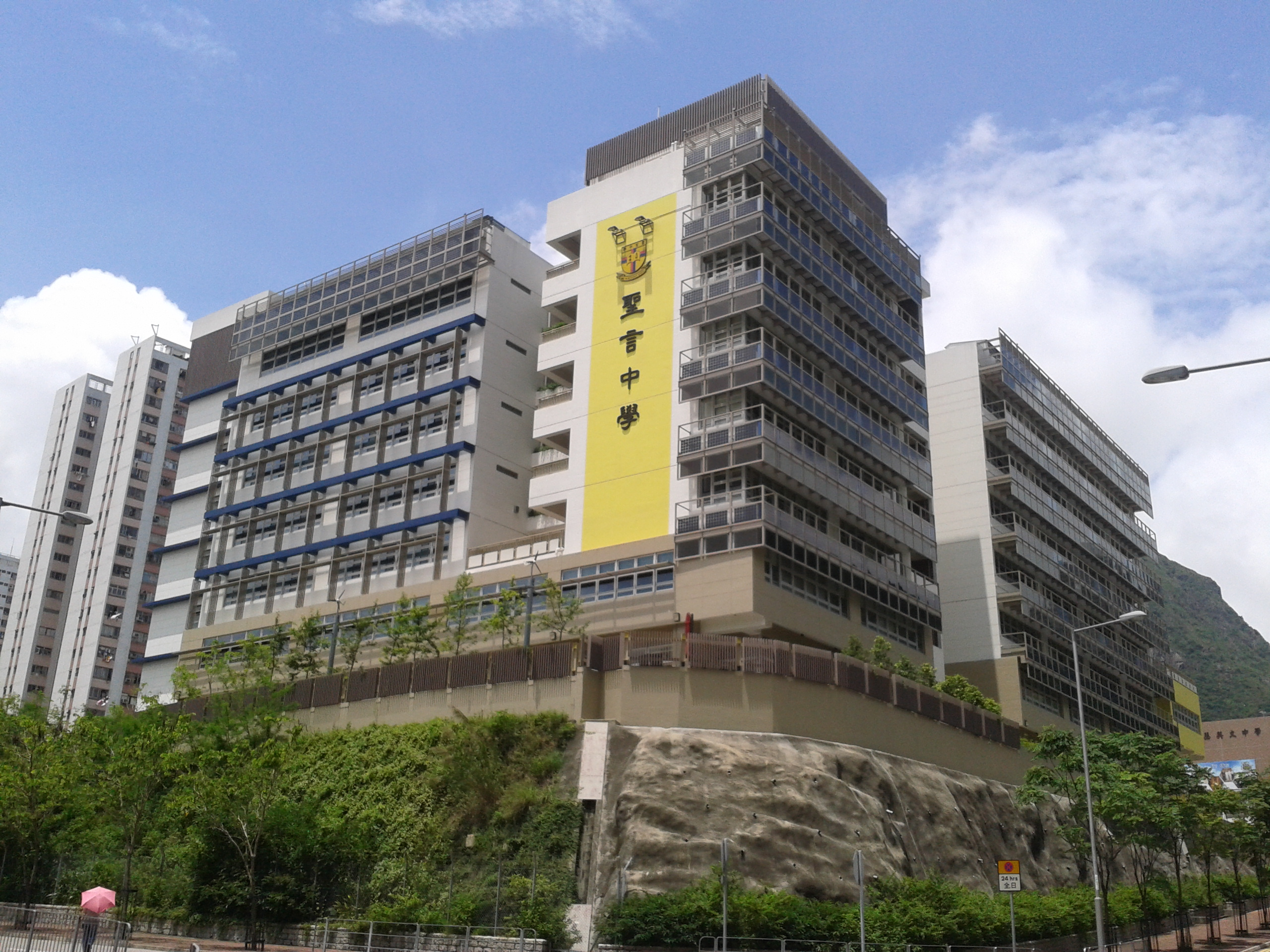

Location
- 38 New Clear Water Bay Road, Choi Hung, Kowloon; Hong Kong

Information
- Type: Boys-only, aided secondary school
- Motto: Being able to manifest one's highest morality
- Religious affiliation: Catholic
- Opened: 1970; 56 years ago
- Founder: Fr. H.P. Canavan
- President: Rev. Johnson Dhos
- Principal: Dr. Hui Chi Kuen
- Faculty: 65
- Classes: 30
- Language: English
- Campus size: 70,000 sq ft (6,500 m^{2})
- Affiliation: Divine Word Missionaries
- Website: www.singyin.edu.hk

Sing Yin Secondary School
- Traditional Chinese: 聖言中學
- Simplified Chinese: 圣言中学
Transcriptions
Standard Mandarin
- Hanyu Pinyin: Shèngyán Zhōngxué
Yue: Cantonese
- Jyutping: sing3 jin4 zung1 hok6

Sing Yin Secondary School (Chinese: 聖言中學), founded in 1970, is a Catholic, boys' secondary school in Hong Kong. The campus size is around 70,000 sq ft (6,500 m^{2}). The school was dubbed "The Greenest School on Earth" by the U.S. Green Building Council in 2013.

== Overview ==
Sing Yin Secondary School was organized by Fr. H.P. Canavan, a priest of the Divine Word Missionaries. Later, he served as the principal and supervisor of the school for more than 20 years.

== Facilities ==
=== Old Lam Tin campus ===
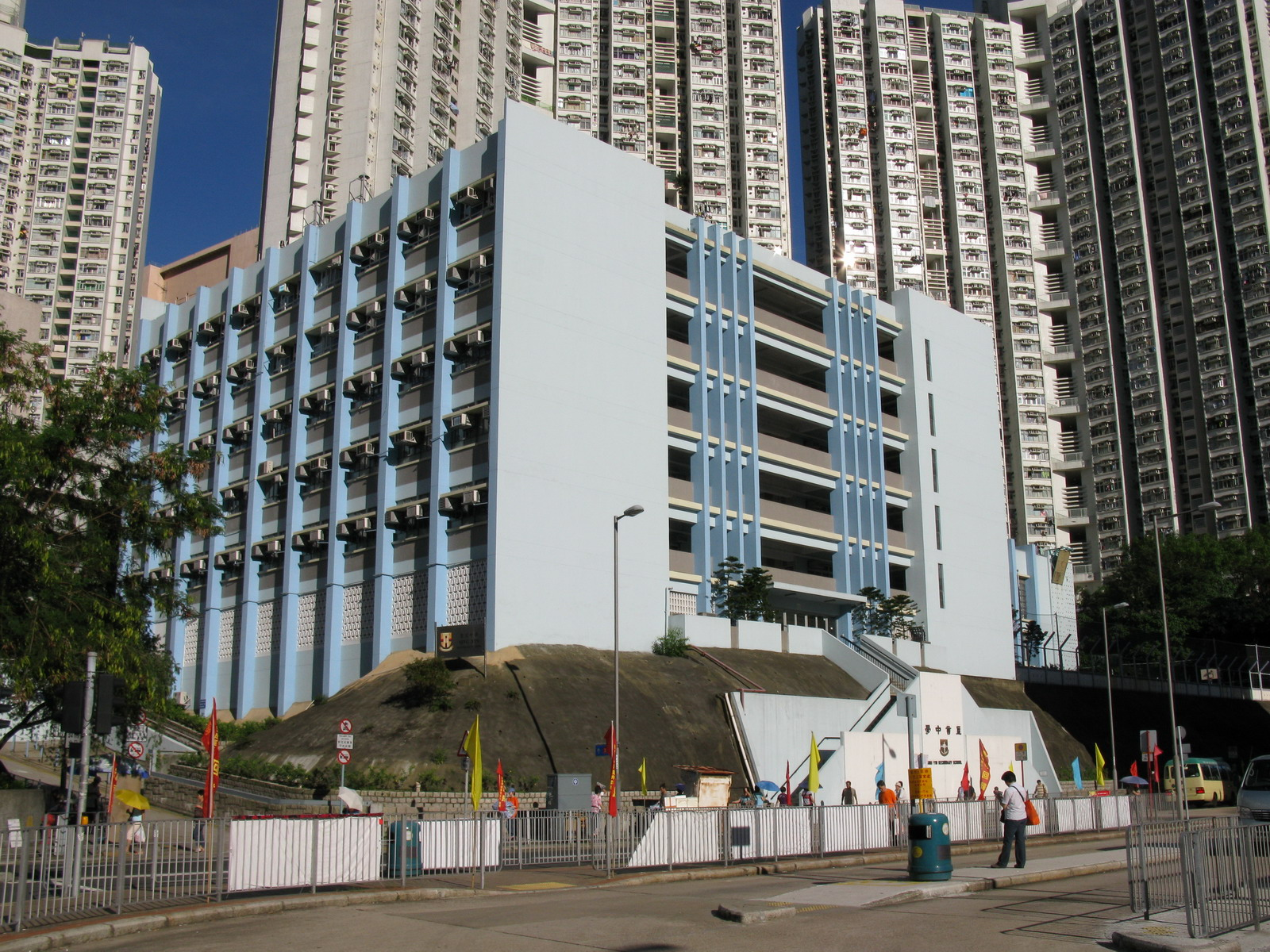
On Tin Street Campus

Sing Yin Secondary School's old Lam Tin Campus was located at 11 On Tin Street, Lam Tin. It was opposite the St. Paul's School (Lam Tin), both of which are well-known single-sex schools in the Kwun Tong District. The campus was converted into the primary campus for Nord Anglia International School Hong Kong.

=== New Choi Wan campus ===
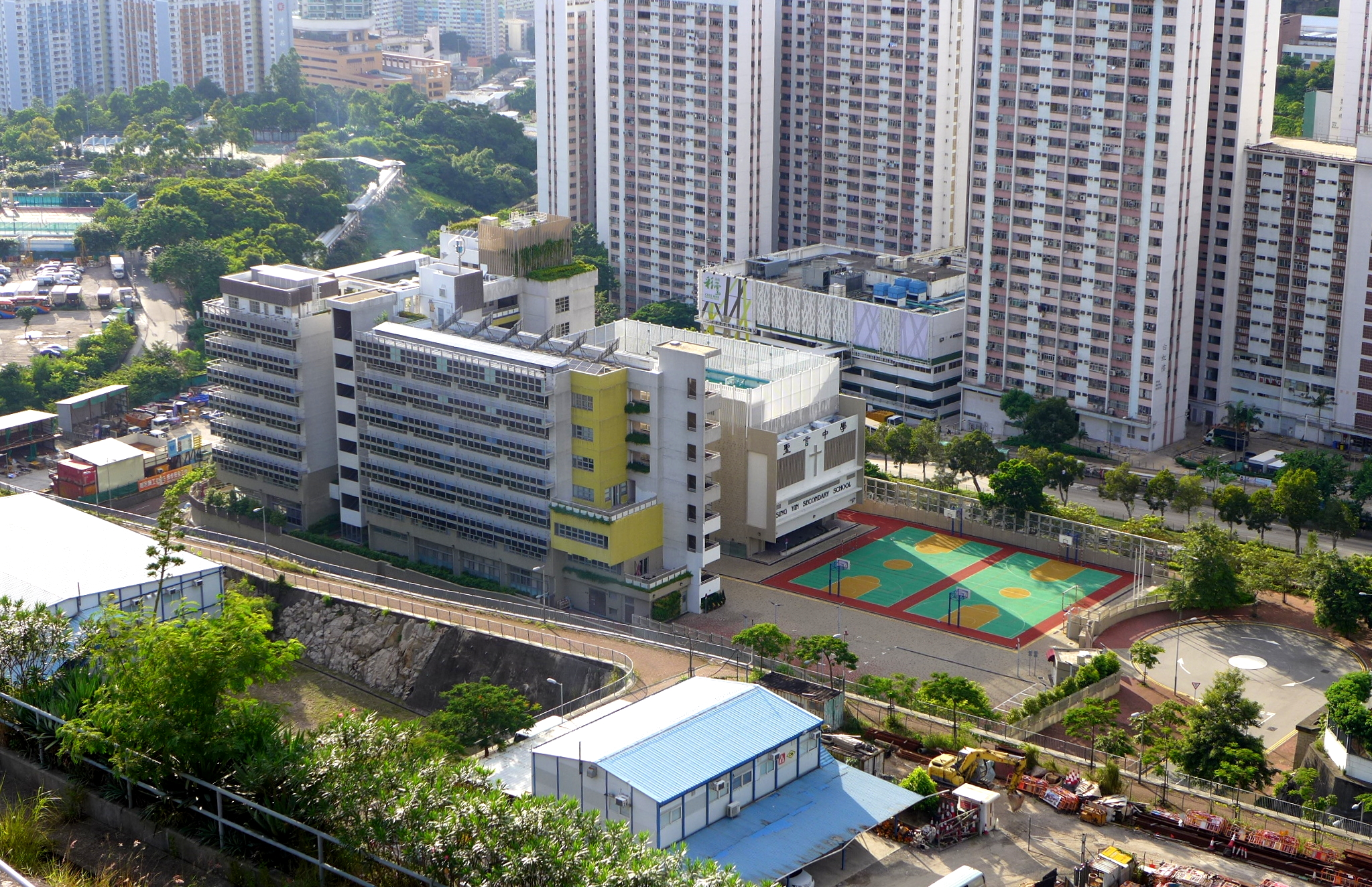
Choi Wan Campus

Sing Yin moved to its current campus at 38 New Clear Water Bay Road, Choi Hung in 2011. It is the first environmental demonstration school in Hong Kong.

The new campus includes new facilities such as:

- motion sensors in every classroom
- electricity regeneration lift
- photovoltaic panels with solar tracking capability
- water chiller plants
- vertical wind turbine
- sun tubes
- solar-powered water sprinklers

The school was dubbed "The Greenest School on Earth" by the U.S. Green Building Council in 2013.

== See also ==
- Society of the Divine Word
