= St. Paul's Secondary School =

- 聖保祿中學

Location
- 18A Ventris Road, Happy Valley; Hong Kong; 22°16′21″N 114°11′05″E

Information
- Type: Private Roman Catholic Grant, Girls' secondary education institution
- Motto: Omnia Omnibus (Latin); All things to all men
- Religious affiliations: Roman Catholic (Sisters of Charity of St. Paul)
- Established: 1960; 66 years ago
- School district: Happy Valley (Wan Chai)
- Principal: Tracy Cheung
- Grades: F.1 - F.6
- Colours: Sapphire, black, white
- Supervisor: Fung Choi Wa
- Website: http://www.spss.edu.hk

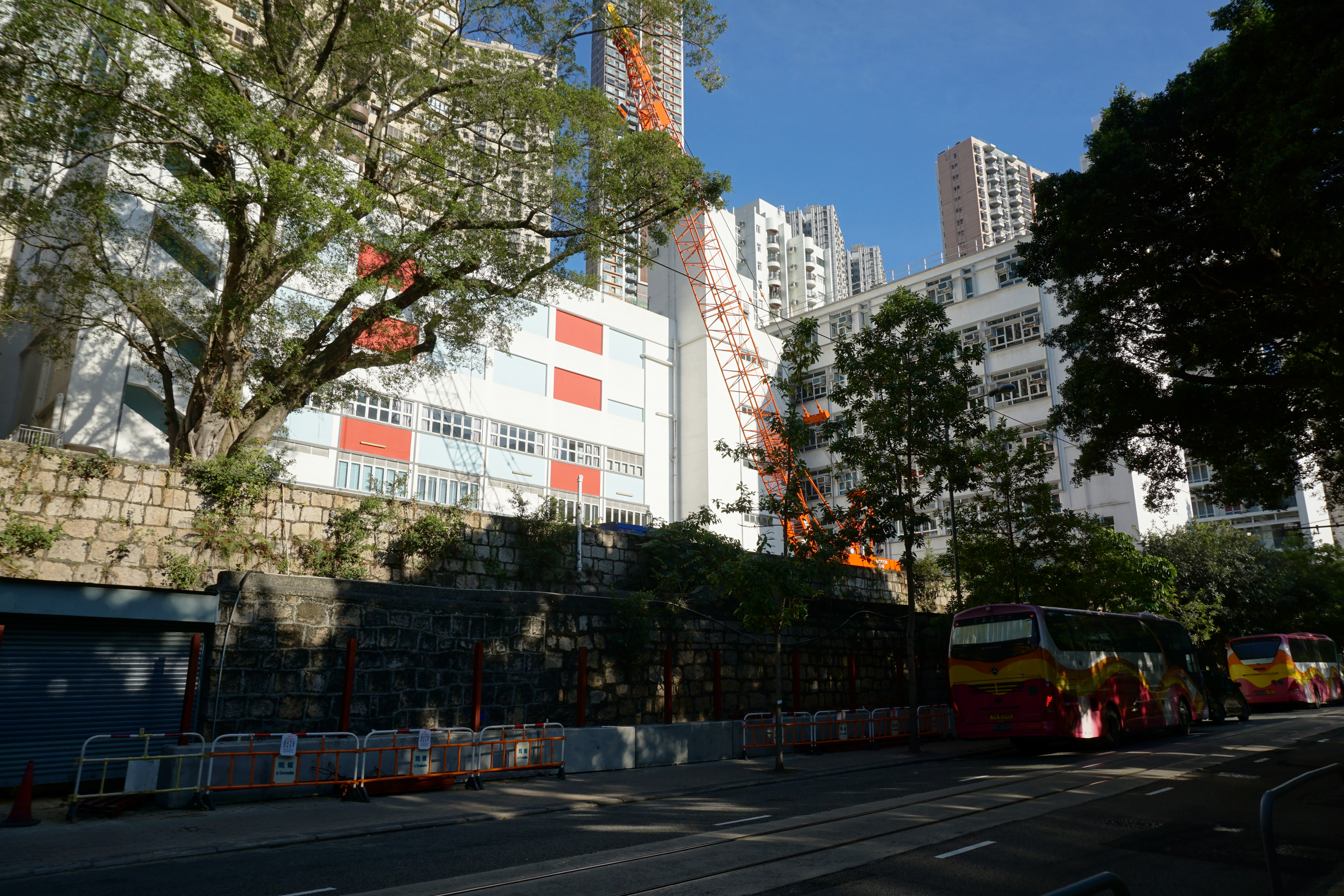
West of St. Paul's Secondary School

St. Paul's Secondary School (SPSS, Chinese: 聖保祿中學) is a Catholic girls' secondary school situated on Ventris Road in Happy Valley, Hong Kong. It is a Catholic grant-in-aid Anglo-Chinese Secondary Grammar School for girls.

== History ==
St. Paul's Secondary School is a Catholic grant-in-aid Anglo-Chinese secondary grammar school for girls. It was one of the first girls' schools in Hong Kong to offer science subjects and computer studies in the upper forms and computer literacy in the lower forms. It introduced integrated science in the late 60s, computer studies in the late 70s, computer literacy and family life education in the early 80s and implemented IT in education in the 90s. It was selected as one of the 10 pilot secondary schools in the IT in Education Pilot Scheme in 1998.

To date, it has widened its curriculum and developed itself into a fully integrated educational institute with arts, sciences, commercial and social sciences at all levels.

=== First foundation ===
St. Paul's Secondary School owes its parentage to the Sisters of St. Paul de Chartres who arrived in Hong Kong from France in 1848. They became involved in local education soon after their arrival. They sponsored and ran St. Paul's Convent School in 1854 and their work of educational excellence became well known in Hong Kong.

=== Second foundation ===
St. Paul's Secondary School was founded in 1960 by the Sisters of St. Paul of Chartres as an extension of St. Paul's Convent School to meet the growing needs of science education of girls in Hong Kong at secondary and matriculation levels.

Its former principal, Damian Lai, retired in 2006.

== Academics ==
There are five classes in each of form 1 to form 6, constituting a total of 30 classes. Most of the form 1 students come from St. Paul's Primary Catholic School and the rest come from other primary schools.

== Extra-curricular activities ==
=== Music ===
The SPSS Symphony Orchestra was established in 2005 and has actively participated in various competitions in Hong Kong. It has won numerous awards, including second place at the Hong Kong Schools Music Festival (香港校際音樂節), the gold award in the Hong Kong Youth Music Interflows (香港青年音樂匯演), etc. The orchestra also performs at the school's annual concerts, open days and other events. In addition to the symphony orchestra, SPSS also has a wide range of musical groups, including the Junior and Intermediate Choirs, as well as a String Orchestra and a Wind Band. The School Intermediate Choir came first with 92 marks in this year's Schools Music Festival: Intermediate Girls Choir Competition Singing in Foreign Language Second Division. The School Junior Choir, out of 27 competitors, came second with 87 marks in this year's Schools Music Festival: Girls Choir Competition Singing in Foreign Language Second Division.

=== Sports ===
The School organizes a wide variety of sports teams, including Athletics, Basketball, Volleyball, Badminton, Table Tennis, National Dance, Fencing, Rope Skipping. The School is also actively participate in invitation competition organised by various school.

Basketball team

St. Paul's Secondary School has a basketball team. The team won Overall Champion in the Inter-School Basketball Competition 2006/07l.

== Notable alumnae ==
=== Politics and law ===
- Dr. Margaret Ng Ngoi-yee: Politician, barrister, writer and columnist. Practising barrister in Hong Kong since 1988. Member of the Legal functional constituency of the Legislative Council of Hong Kong (1998-2012). Former director at Stand News and a former member of Civic Party.
- Pamela Peck: Hong Kong famous columnist, radio host, actor, social activist
- Claudia Mo: Former Legislative Council Member (Kowloon West geographical constituency), former The Standard, TVB and RTHK journalist. Hong Kong media worker, pan-democratic camp politician, and former member of the Civic Party
- Professor Sophia Chan Siu-chee, GBS, JP: Former Secretary for Food and Health Bureau

=== Sport ===
- Siobhán Haughey: Famous Hong Kong swimmer, holder of 10 Hong Kong records. In the 2016 Olympic Games, she became the first Hong Kong swimmer to reach the semi-final of the women's swimming event, and she won the silver medal in the women's 200m freestyle at the 2020 Tokyo Olympics
- Chan Wai Kei: Famous windsurfer, windsurfing gold medalist at the 2009 East Asian Games

=== Culture and media ===
- Sandy Lau Sin Ting: The 2009 Miss Hong Kong champion
- Roxanne Tong Lok Man: 2012 Miss Hong Kong Tourism Ambassador, Beauty Sublimation and Most Popular Pageant, female artist and TV actress
- Sisley Choi: Miss Hong Kong 2013 first runner-up, famous female artist and TV drama actor
- Scarlett Wong: Former ViuTV artist and host of a famous Hong Kong show. Sister of actress Jacqueline Wong
- Ada To Man-Wai: Famous stage actress, screenwriter, composer and lyricist
- Emily Kwan Po Wai: Famous TV actor and singer
- Rosa Maria Velasco: Famous stage actress
- Jarita Wan: Famous musical actress
- Ashley Cheung: Winner of the HAF Award at the 2016 Hong Kong International Film and Television Festival
- Gladys Li Ching Kwan: Model and actor
- JuJu Chan Szeto: Hong Kong singer-songwriter, female action actress, taekwondo athlete, film producer, 2009 Miss Chinatown America
- Wancy Tai: Hong Kong female singer
- Kristy Shaw: Miss Hong Kong 2021 runner-up and Miss Friendship
- Lam Tze Wing, Nora: Director
- Sinnie Ng: member of the girl group Lolly Talk

== Associated schools ==
Other sister schools:

- St. Paul's Convent School
- St. Paul's School (Lam Tin)
- St Paul's International College (Australia)

== See also ==
- Education in Hong Kong
- List of secondary schools in Hong Kong
