= Mère Benjamin =

French Roman Catholic missionary sister in Vietnam (1821–1884)

Mother Benjamin Le Noël de Groussy
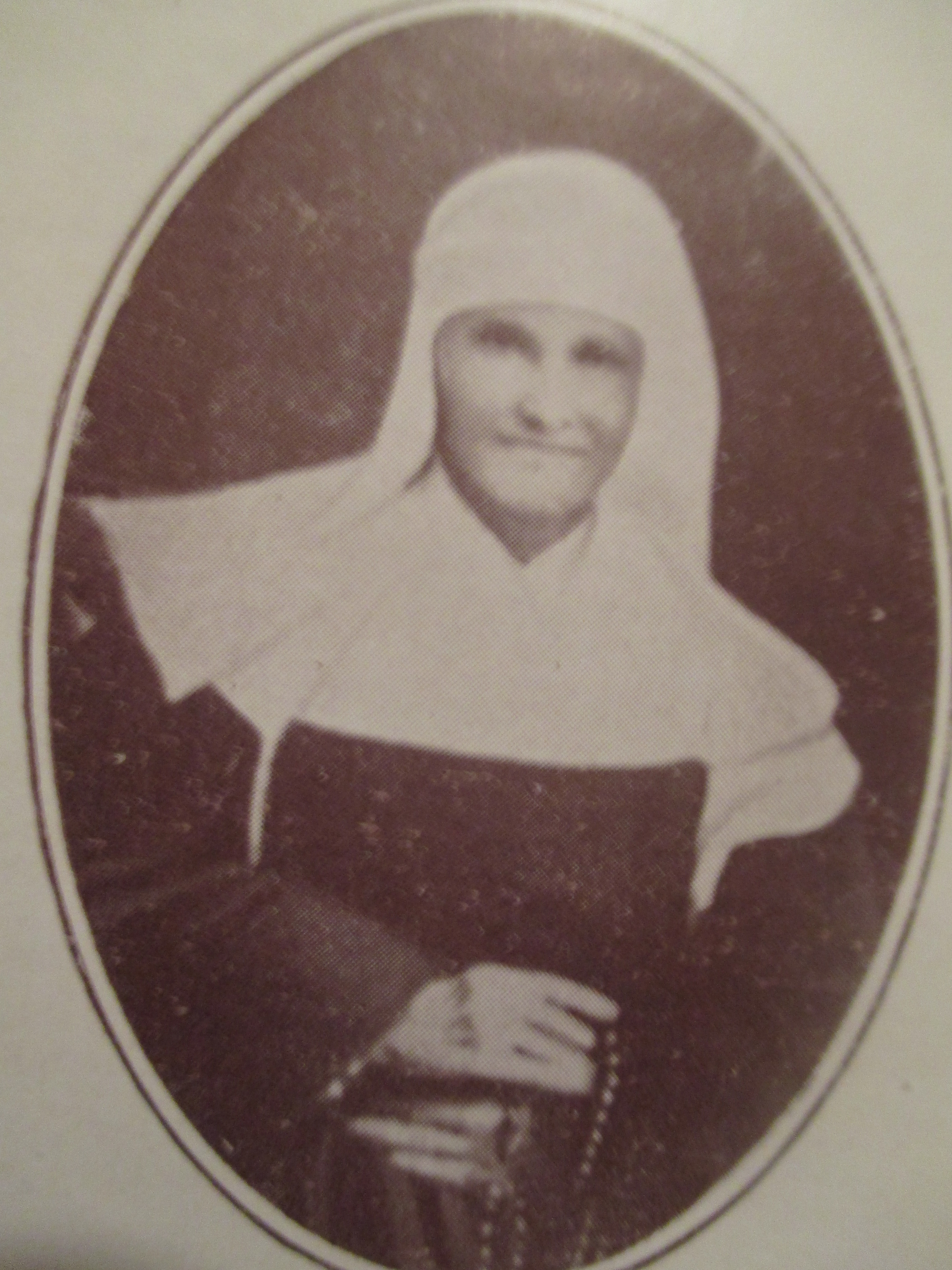
- Mother Benjamin late in life

Personal life
- Born: Anaïs Le Noël de Groussy; 24 October 1821 Périers, Manche, France
- Died: 20 May 1884 (aged 62) Saigon, French Cochinchina
- Resting place: Chapel of the Sainte-Enfance convent, Saigon
- Known for: Expansion of the Sisters of Saint Paul of Chartres in French Indochina
- Occupation: Catholic sister, missionary, hospital administrator, educator

Religious life
- Religion: Catholic
- Institute: Sisters of Saint Paul of Chartres

Mother Benjamin Le Noël de Groussy (24 October 1821 – 20 May 1884) was a French Catholic sister of the Sisters of Saint Paul of Chartres. She is known for expanding the congregation's work in French Cochinchina (today Viêt Nam) and the broader region of French Indochina, establishing a network of hospitals, orphanages, schools, nurseries and institutions for people with leprosy.

== Early life and religious formation ==
Anaïs Le Noël de Groussy (Note: Some local sources give her civil name as Arcène Anaïse Lenoël de Groucy.) was born on 24 October 1821 at Périers, in the Manche department of Normandy, France. She came from a minor noble family from the region of Coutances. Her father was the administrator of the local hospice-orphanage. Her childhood visits there are thought to have shaped her later vocation to charitable and medical work.

At the age of twenty she entered the Sisters of Saint Paul of Chartres, a congregation founded at the end of the seventeenth century by Louis Chauvet and Marie-Anne de Tilly for the education of children, the care of the sick and service to the poor. On entering religious life she received the name Benjamin, under which she later became widely known in Asia. Before being sent overseas, she served for nine years as mistress of novices at the congregation's mother house in Chartres.

== Mission in East Asia ==
=== Hong Kong and Macau ===
Mother Benjamin was assigned to the Far East in 1858. She left France in December of that year with several companions and arrived in Hong Kong on 21 June 1859. She became head of the congregation's community there, where the Sisters of Saint Paul of Chartres had been present for about a decade.

The sisters had been invited to Hong Kong in 1848 by Bishop Théodore-Augustin Forcade to administer a garrison hospital, whose patients included many Catholic Irish soldiers. They also ran a school for Irish girls and for girls descended from Portuguese settlers from Macau. By the time of her arrival, the congregation had also opened an orphanage for Chinese girls abandoned at birth.

=== Cochinchina ===
About fifteen months after her arrival in Hong Kong, Mother Benjamin was sent with approximately twenty sisters to Cochinchina at the request of Bishop Dominique Lefèbvre, vicar apostolic of Western Cochinchina. The region was then in the grip of the Franco-Spanish military intervention, whose fighting would soon give way to the establishment of French colonial rule over southern Vietnam.

On her arrival on 20 May 1860, she founded a hospital at Saigon, followed by institutions at Mỹ Tho, Biên Hòa (1861) and Bà Rịa (1862), as well as orphanages for girls, supported in part by the Association of the Holy Childhood. What began as modest establishments would develop into significant charitable and medical institutions.By 1864, the sisters' orphanage was educating about 150 orphan children, mainly girls. The colonial civil administration also asked the sisters to serve as nurses in hospitals for the local population at Thủ Thiêm and Chợ Quán.

Under her leadership, the Sisters of Saint Paul of Chartres played a key role in spreading Catholicism throughout Indochina, alongside the Congregation of the Lovers of the Holy Cross of Jesus-Christ, founded specifically for Vietnam by Pierre Lambert de la Motte.

== Admission of Asian sisters ==
In 1866, Mother Benjamin was recalled to Chartres by the congregation's superior general. She had been criticised for admitting local women to the novitiate. According to Élisabeth Dufourcq, among these early candidates were orphans and women descended from Christians martyred during Emperor Tự Đức persecutions of 1861.

Mother Benjamin successfully defended her position and returned to Cochinchina. The Sisters of Saint Paul of Chartres thereby became one of the first major French congregations to admit Asian women into its own institute, rather than maintaining separate indigenous congregations. The first Asian members admitted under her direction included five Viet women and one Hoa Chinese woman. For several decades, however, the choir sisters remained European, while lay sisters could be either European or Asian.

== Expansion in Asia ==
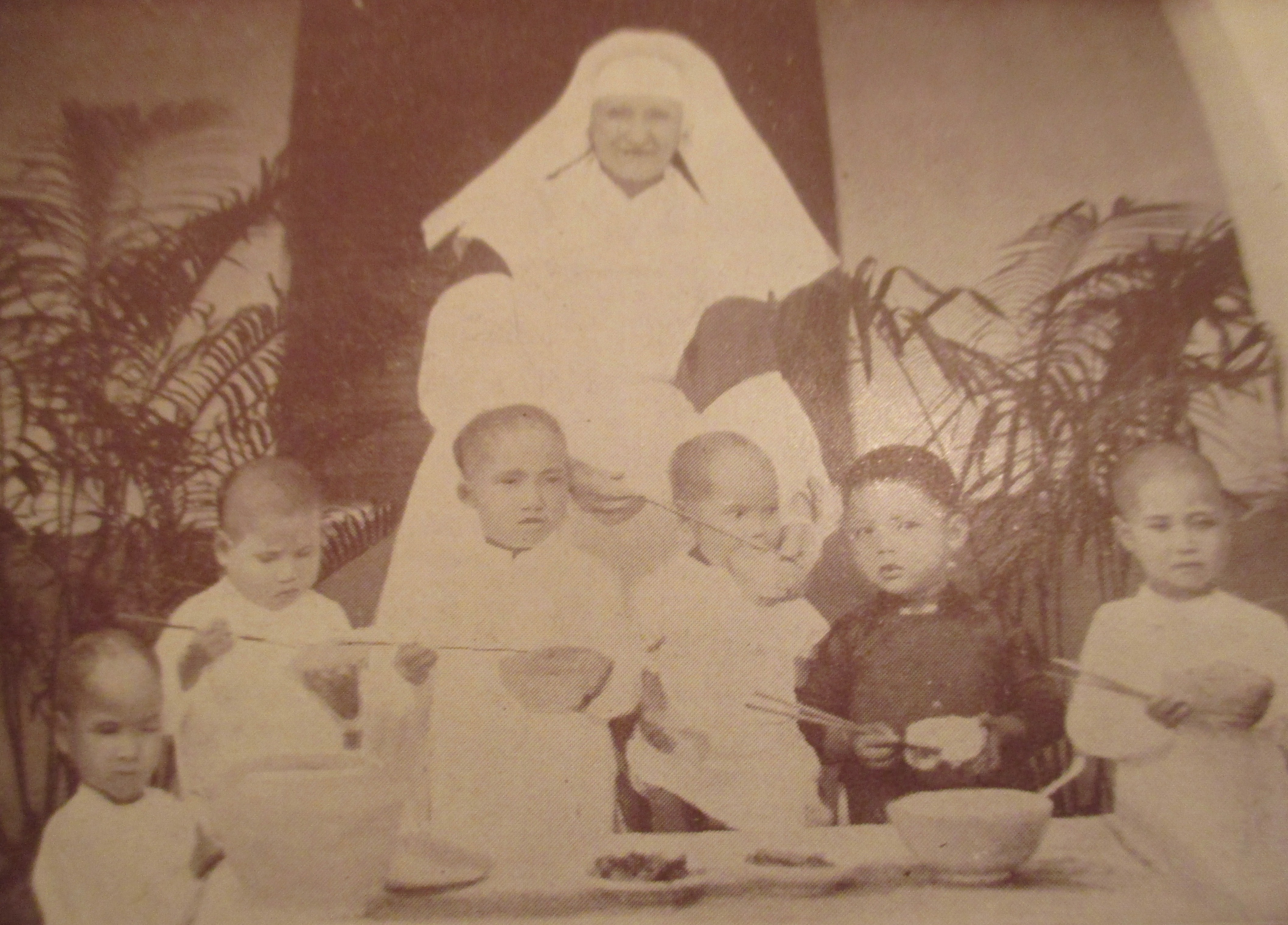
The Holy Childhood orphanage at Nam Định in the 1920s.

As demand for their services grew, the sisters took on the staffing of both military and civilian hospitals across the French colonial empire. Alongside their original Saigon foundation, they were granted land at Phú Mỹ by Admiral Louis Adolphe Bonard, where they established a chapel, a farm, and an orphanage. Financial support from Europe, channeled largely through the Association of the Holy Childhood, helped sustain this expanding network.

Mother Benjamin then oversaw a systematic extension of the congregation's works throughout southern Vietnam, founding nurseries, workrooms, hospitals, and orphanages at Chợ Lớn, Vĩnh Long, Nam Định, Mỹ Tho and several other towns. In Saigon she established a boarding school for European and Eurasian girls, whose fees were used to fund a refuge for abandoned children, and opened a novitiate to train candidates drawn from Cochinchina itself.

The congregation's reach soon extended northward. At the request of Admiral Amédée Courbet, sisters were dispatched to staff hospitals in Hanoi and Haiphong. Missionary bishops in turn called for foundations in Ceylon, Siam and Japan. By the end of Mother Benjamin's tenure, the congregation had opened three orphanages in East Asia outside Indochina, among them one at Yokohama that would grow into one of its most prominent institutions.

== Death and legacy ==
Mother Benjamin died of malaria at Saigon on 20 May 1884, aged 62. She was buried in the chapel of the Sainte-Enfance convent in Saigon, now the St Paul de Chartres convent in Ho Chi Minh City. She was succeeded by Mother Marie-Virginie Richard.

In the decades that followed, the congregation of the Sisters of Saint Paul of Chartres grew into a predominantly Asian institution. Vietnam has remained one of the important regions of the congregation's presence, while European vocations declined during the twentieth and twenty-first centuries.

== Bibliography ==
- Dufourcq, Élisabeth (2009). Les aventurières de Dieu: trois siècles d'histoire missionnaire française. Tempus (in French) (2nd ed.). Paris: Perrin. ISBN 978-2-262-03092-6.
- Hamel, Jean-François (2003). Gautier, René (ed.). Dictionnaire des personnages remarquables de la Manche. Inédits & introuvables (in French). Vol. 3. Marigny: Eurocibles. ISBN 2-914541-17-1.
- Archives of the Generalate of the Sisters of Saint Paul of Chartres. Via della Vignaccia, Rome: Sisters of Saint Paul of Chartres.
- Archives of the Mother House of the Sisters of Saint Paul of Chartres. Chartres, France: Sisters of Saint Paul of Chartres.

== See also ==
- Sisters of Saint Paul of Chartres
- Catholic Church in Vietnam
- French Indochina
- French Cochinchina
- Association of the Holy Childhood
