= Joey Wat =

Chinese executive (born 1971)

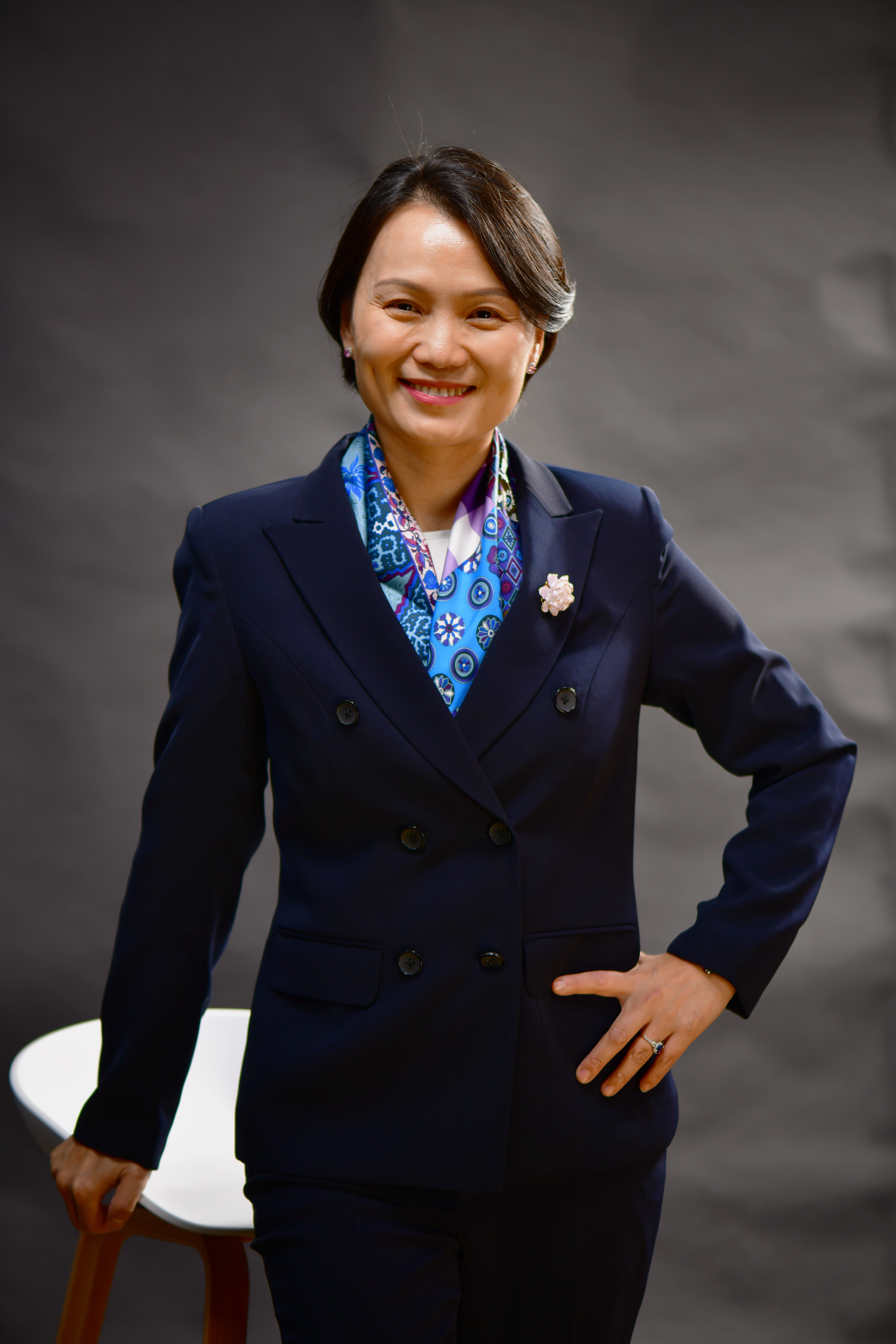
- Wat in 2021
- Born: 26 June 1971 (age 55); Fujian, China
- Education: Hong Kong University, Northwestern University's Kellogg School of Management
- Occupation: CEO of Yum China
- Employer: Yum China
- Spouse: John H. Ott

Joey Chui Yung Wat (Chinese: 屈翠容; pinyin: Qū Cuìróng; born 26 June 1971) is the chief executive officer of Yum China. She also was CEO of KFC China, managing director of A.S. Watson Group UK, and spent seven years in management consulting.

As of May 2020, she is one of only 37 female CEOs on the Fortune 500.

== Early life and education ==
Wat was born on June 26, 1971, in a poor neighborhood near Fuzhou, China. Wat's family moved to Hong Kong around 1980. Wat worked nights to support her family, while going to school during the day. She worked at a factory that created plastic flower arrangements starting at the age of nine. and also worked as a waitress between the ages of 15 and 18. She graduated third in her class in high school and won the Hong Kong Outstanding Students Award.

After high school, Wat attended the University of Hong Kong, where she studied development economics. After graduating with first-class honors in 1994, she returned to her hometown in Fuzhou. She saw that the area had prospered due to private investment. She decided to go into business, initially working at AT Kearney, a business consultancy. Then, she moved to the United States to attend Northwestern University's Kellogg School of Management, where she earned a Master's degree in Business Administration.

== Career ==
Wat started her career as a consultant at A.T. Kearney, and then from 2000 to 2003 as a management consultant at McKinsey & Company in Hong Kong.

She joined A.S. Watson Group UK in 2004, becoming head of strategy for over 10 countries in Europe and managing director of A.S. Watson Group UK.

In 2014, Wat left A.S. Watson Group and moved back to China, where she started working for Yum! Brands. Wat started as the President of KFC China in 2014. She was promoted to CEO of KFC China in 2015. KFC was Wat's first position in the food industry. Wat studied KFC's business for six months prior to her appointment and submitted a report to the board on her strategy shortly after starting.

Wat modernized KFC’s China business with digital marketing, delivery services, online payments, digital food ordering, renovated stores, and new uniforms created by fashion designers. Over time, profits improved, and more than 95% of KFC stores in China were renovated as of 2019, while more than 1,000 new KFC stores were opened from 2014-2019.

In 2016, Yum China was spun-off from Yum! Brands as an independent company and listed on the New York Stock Exchange. Wat became the CEO of the new Yum China, in 2018, overseeing the China operations of KFC, Pizza Hut, and other restaurant brands, with roughly 450,000 employees in China. Wat focused on digital initiatives and modernization like she did for KFC. By 2020 over 90% of customer payments were digital. She also implemented an online loyalty program that exceeded 300 million participants by 2021.

During the COVID-19 pandemic, Wat expanded on Yum China's contactless food delivery services, set up a fund to assist affected employees, and expanded on Yum China's health insurance program for families of store managers. At the start of the pandemic, Wat temporarily closed one-third of Yum China's locations, most of which were re-opened a few weeks later.

Wat is credited with Yum China's overall growth during her tenure as CEO. She has worked to improve Yum China’s supply chain and operations processes to launch a wider range of dine-in, delivery, and off-premise food items. Yum China introduced around 400 new or updated menu items at its restaurants in 2019 and over 500 in 2020.

== Recognition ==
Wat has been repeatedly included in

- Forbes' list of the World's 100 Most Powerful Women in 2023, 2022, 2021 as well as
- Fortune Magazine's list of Most Powerful Women,
- Forbes China's list of Top 100 Businesswomen in 2023, 2022, 2021, 2020, 2019 and
- Fortune China's Most Powerful Women in Business list in 2023, 2022, 2021, 2020, 2018 and
- Fortune China's list of China's 50 Most Influential Business Leaders in 2023, 2022, 2021, 2020, 2018
- Business Insider's list of 100 People Transforming Business in Asia 2020.

== See also ==
- Wat (surname)
