= St. Paul's Convent School =

Secondary school in Hong Kong

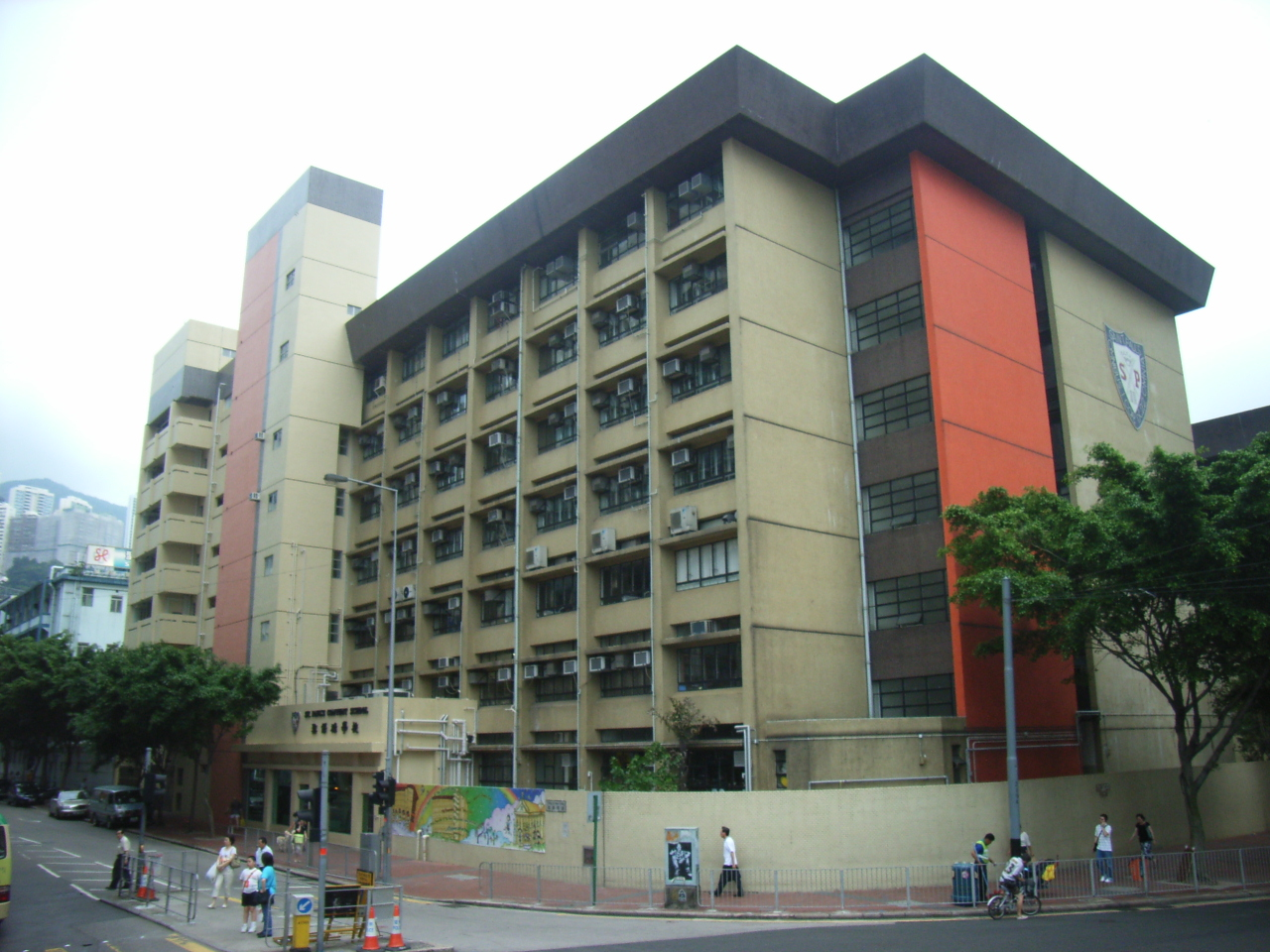
- St. Paul's Convent School

Location
- 140 Leighton Road, Causeway Bay, Hong Kong Island; Hong Kong
- 22°16′42″N 114°11′15″E

Information
- Former names: French Convent School (1854–1955)
- Type: Private DSS Roman Catholic Girls' Basic education institution
- Motto: Latin: Omnia omnibus English: Being all things to all people (1 Cor 9:22).
- Religious affiliations: Roman Catholic (Sisters of Charity of St. Paul),
- Established: 1854; 172 years ago
- Headmistresses: Mrs M. Leung (Primary Section); Sr. Margaret Wong, SPC (Secondary Section)
- Website: http://www.spcs.edu.hk

St. Paul's Convent School (SPCS, Chinese: 聖保祿學校) is a private Catholic girls' school in Hong Kong founded by the Sisters of St. Paul de Chartres from France in 1854. The school was formerly called French Convent School and was renamed St. Paul's Convent School in 1955. It ranks third among all secondary schools in Hong Kong (2022).

The school has four sections: nursery N1–N4, kindergarten K1–K3, primary P1–P6 and secondary F1-F6.

The school's motto is Omnia omnibus, Latin for "Being all things to all people, irrespective of race, religion or social status. (1 Cor 9:22).

The summer uniform of St. Paul's Convent School is a white back-buttoned short-sleeved blouse, a checkered skirt with black and white shoes (commonly known as "panda shoes"), a bow tie for kindergarten and primary school students, a normal tie for middle school students. For the nursery students, it is a red and white uniform. The winter uniform is a white long-sleeved shirt and navy blue skirt for middle school students.

== Facilities ==
School facilities include:

- The Classroom of the Future
- 3D Printing Studio
- Multi-media Self-learning Centre
- Computer-aided Learning Laboratory
- Information Technology Learning Centre
- Creative Media Laboratory
- Campus TV Station
- 6 Science Laboratories
- Study Room and Library
- KLA Special Rooms
- Dance Studio
- Art Room
- Music Room
- Organic Roof Garden
- Hydroponic Greenhouse
- Indoor Heated Swimming Pool

The school has also recently built a 'green building', known as the 'Smart Oasis', that integrates technology with nature. Recently, it also established a Lingzhi Farm as well as installed 85" interactive Promethean whiteboards for all classrooms and some special rooms.

The school also has installed some accessibility features for students who may be disabled or have special needs, such as wheelchair ramps, elevators (which are mostly used by the teachers) and accessible toilets.

== Houses ==
Students in St. Paul's Convent School are separated into six houses. In annual events like Sports Day and Swimming Gala, the six houses compete in cheering competitions and aim at achieving the Overall House Champion.

MORRIS (Purple)
Named after Margaret Morris (1891–1980), a British dancer, choreographer, artist and teacher .

CAVELL (Blue)
Named after Edith Louisa Cavell (1865–1915), a British nurse who was executed as a spy during World War I.

KENNY (Green)
Named after Elizabeth Kenny (1886–1952), the Australian nurse known for her technique of treating poliomyelitis, or infantile paralysis.

CURIE (Yellow)
Named after the scientist Marie Skłodowska Curie (1867–1934).

KELLER (Red)
Named after Helen Adams Keller (1880–1968), an American author and educator of the blind.

MASON (Orange)
Named after Charlotte Mason (1842–1923), an educationalist whose philosophy influenced modern primary schools.

== Extracurricular activities ==
Students participate in various extracurricular activities and competitions. For example, the annual Inter-class English and Chinese debate competitions, dance competition and the annual Music Talent Quest (MTQ). There are also 55 extracurricular clubs, societies, voluntary service units and interest groups for students to join and explore their interests and talents. There are also exchange programs with schools of foreign countries, such as trips to Beijing, America, Canada, Sichuan, Spain and France.

SPCS has various sports teams including athletics team, swimming team, badminton team, dragon dance team, table tennis team and netball team.

The SPCS dance club consists of Western dance team, Modern dance team and Chinese dance team.

The two SPCS dance teams perform in various occasions, such as the opening of 2008 Beijing Olympics equestrian competitions that was held in Hong Kong. Each team has about 20 dancers which were selected through auditions held around September by committee members. Dancers receive training once or twice a week, each ranging from 1–2 hours. Extra trainings are often organized before competitions.

== Notable alumni ==
- Yeung Sau-king, Olympic swimmer
- Lydia Dunn, Baroness Dunn, former life peer in the House of Lords of the UK Parliament
- Pansy Ho, businesswoman
- Margaret Ng, politician, barrister, writer
- Edwina Lau, head of the National Security Department of the Hong Kong Police Force
- Christine Loh, former member of the Legislative Council of Hong Kong, former Undersecretary for the Environment HKSAR
- Ann Hui, film director, producer, screenwriter and actress
- Emily Ying Yang Chan, humanitarian doctor
- Shirley Kwan, singer
- Anne Heung, actress
- Stephanie Che, actress
- Ellen Joyce Loo, singer
- Nicola Cheung, former actress
- Tisa Ho, arts administrator and writer

== Sister Schools ==
- St. Paul's Secondary School
- St. Paul's School (Lam Tin)
