= KFC in China =

Fast food restaurant chain in China

KFC China
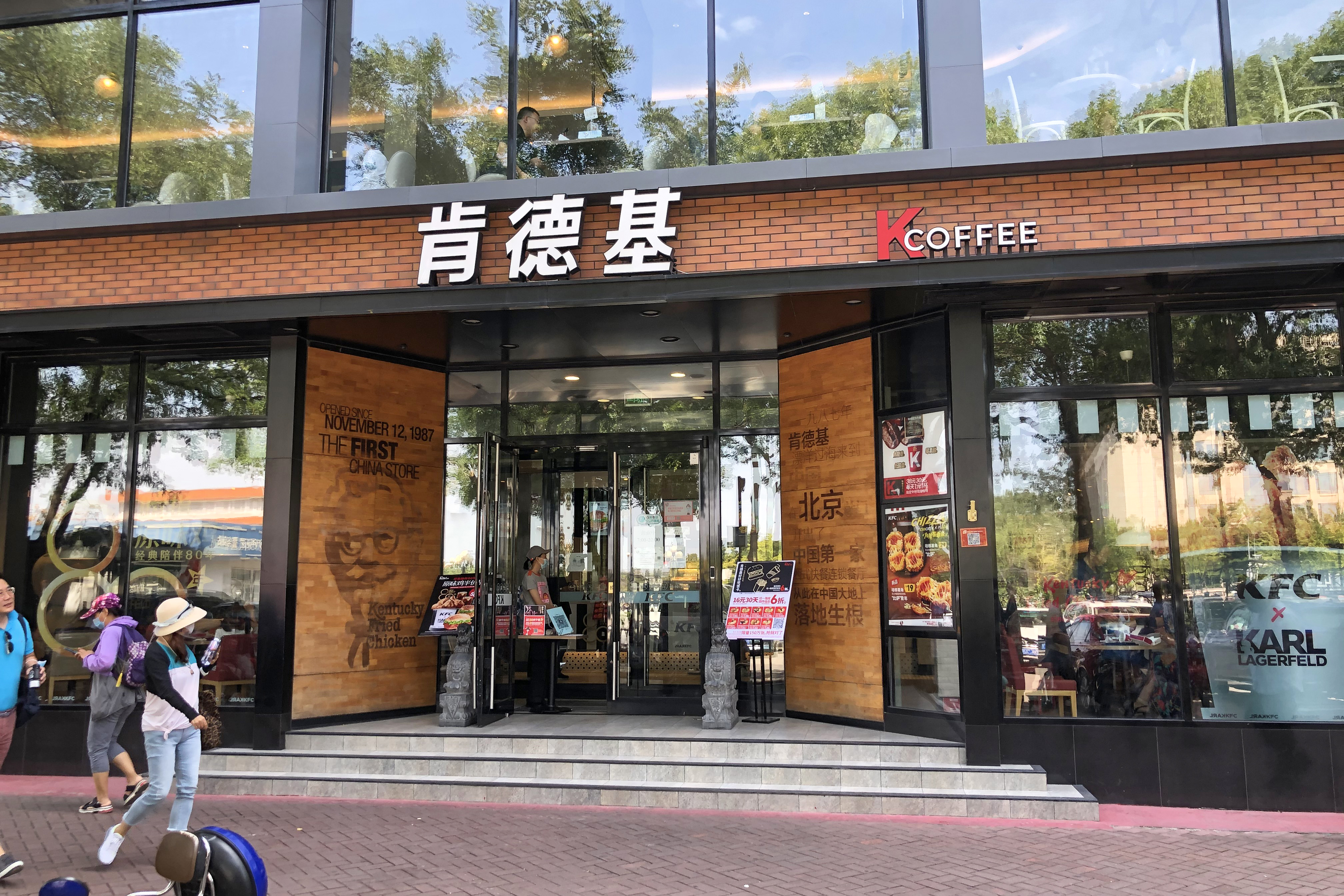
- China's first KFC restaurant at Qianmen, Beijing
- Type: Subsidiary
- Industry: Restaurants
- Founded: First franchise: November 12, 1987; Qianmen, Beijing, China
- Number of locations: over 12,600 (2025)
- Key people: Joey Wat (CEO of Yum China)
- Products: Fried chicken; Chicken sandwiches; Wraps; French fries; Soft drinks; Salads; Desserts; Breakfast; menu prices
- Revenue: US$7.219 billion (2022)
- Parent: Yum China
- Website: www.yumchina.com www.kfc.com.cn (Chinese KFC website)

Kentucky Fried Chicken (KFC; Chinese: 肯德基; pinyin: Kěndéjī), an American fast food restaurant chain specializing in fried chicken, has operated in China since 1987. Its first location opened in Zhengyangmen, Beijing, and KFC now operates over 11,900 outlets in more than 2,300 cities across China as a subsidiary of Yum China as of March 2025. According to research by Millward Brown, KFC was the most powerful foreign brand in China in 2013.

== Ownership ==
KFC was sold to Heublein in the 1970s and later sold to PepsiCo. It was then spun off, along with other fast food chains owned by the company, to become Yum! Brands in 1997. KFC restaurants in China are owned or franchised by Yum China, a restaurant company that also owns the Pizza Hut and Taco Bell chains in China and was spun off from Yum! Brands in 2016.

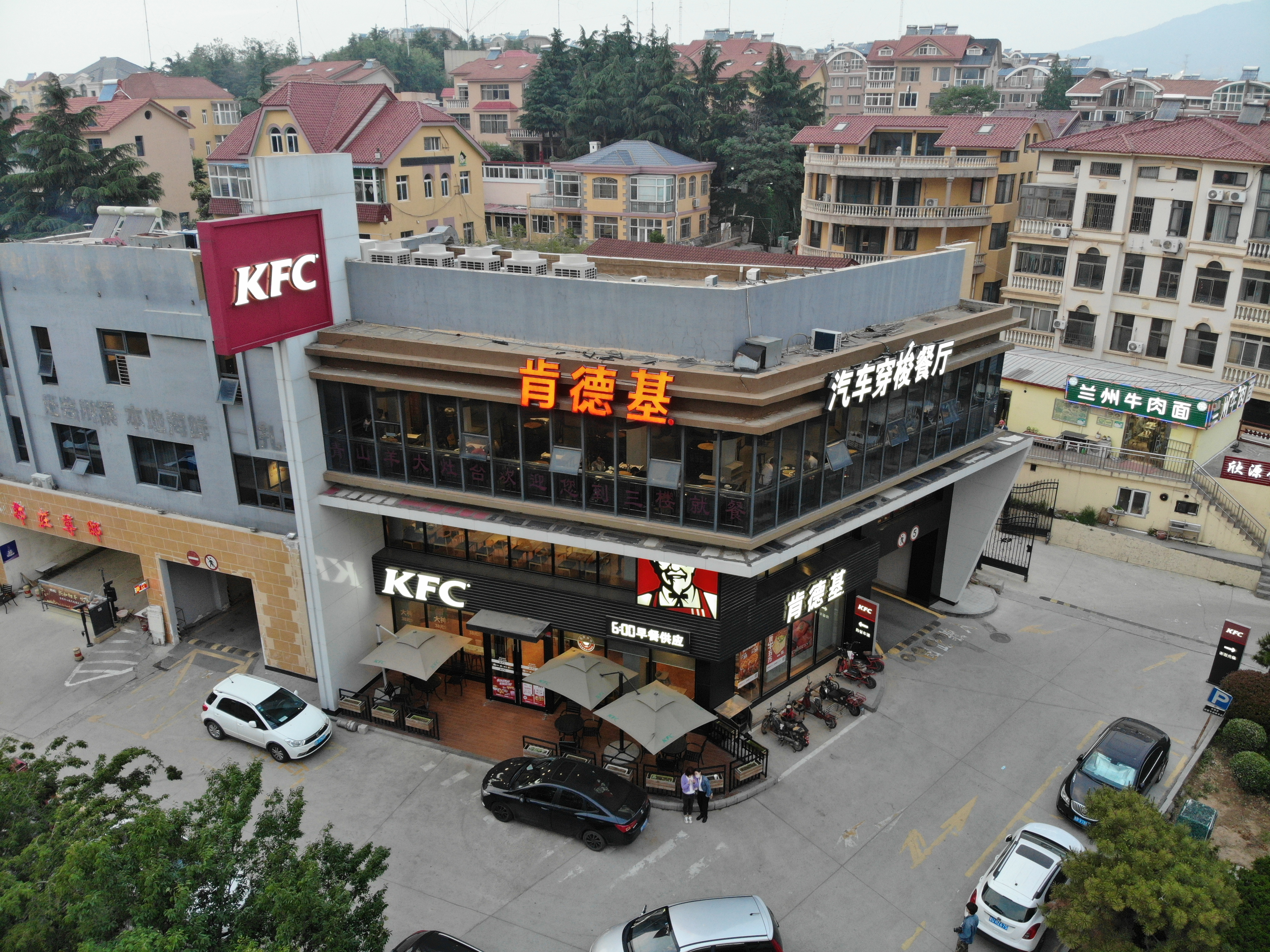
KFC drive through restaurant in Qingdao

== History ==
=== Early days ===
KFC became the first Western fast food company in China after its inaugural outlet opened in Zhengyangmen, Beijing, in November 1987. It was China's introduction to franchising and grew rapidly. The operation was a joint venture, with a 60% stake held by KFC, 27% by the Beijing Municipal Bureau of Culture and 13% by Beijing Food Production. In early 1988, Bank of China took a 25% stake in the venture, and KFC's original stake was diluted to 51%.

Warren Liu, a former vice-president of Tricon Global Restaurants (KFC's former parent company) argued that "being the first....has continued to provide KFC with a substantial competitive advantage." By 1988, the Beijing outlet had the highest volume sales of any KFC in the world.

=== Taiwan influence ===
Instead of hiring managers from America, KFC hired the managers from rising Asian economies such as Taiwan. Existing Chinese distribution infrastructure was poor or non-existent, so KFC created its own to ensure quality standards. The founding leadership were known as "Taiwan Gang" because they were from Taiwan. The team was filled with veterans in the fast food industry with up to 10 years of experience before joining. They were knowledgeable of Chinese culture and formed local partnerships to come up with localized menus and management practices despite being educated in the west. The chain had an early advantage against its Western fast food rivals, as fried chicken has been a staple Chinese dish since antiquity, whereas hamburgers were foreign and relatively unknown.

Taiwanese businessman Tony Wang was hired by KFC in 1975 to work as a business analyst. Wang met with the mayor of Tianjin city, Li Ruihuan, and was asked to teach him how to start a fast food business. Wang used his newfound knowledge to successfully open his business in Tianjin, Orchid Food, and KFC became interested in having him lead the expansion of KFC in China. Although KFC had success with international expansion in Southeast Asia, they struggled to integrate into China. Wang's journey of expanding into China was riddled with problems. KFC was stuck with using chilled chicken since they did not have a transport system for the chicken. China's salt was coarse-grained, but KFC uses fine-grain salt, requiring imports. According to Wang, In addition to ingredients, "skilled labor was hard to find and training the staff was very tedious". Wang was able to open 5 outlets by the time he left KFC in 1990. KFC and Pizza Hut Taiwan operations are managed by Jardine Matheson’s Jardine Restaurant Group.

=== Rapid expansion ===
By 1994, there were 28 KFC outlets in China, including seven in Beijing. By 1997, there were 100 outlets. In 1999, two KFC stores in Changsha were wrecked by crowds protesting the United States bombing of the Chinese embassy in Belgrade. By 2007, there were 2,000 outlets in 240 cities. KFC began to expand North and West into China and also in the central region. Eventually, it gained operations in all of China's provinces except for Tibet. In 2008, CEO David Novak announced plans to open more than 20,000 restaurants in China, saying: "We're in the first innings of a nine-innings ball game in China."

At the beginning of 2008, the chain added its first Chinese street food snack to its menu, the youtiao. The street snack menu was expanded in 2010 with the addition of the shaobing. In August 2010, KFC China announced its biggest product launch to date: the Rice Bowl, which heralded the arrival of rice as an accompaniment across the chain.

=== 2005 Sudan I incident ===
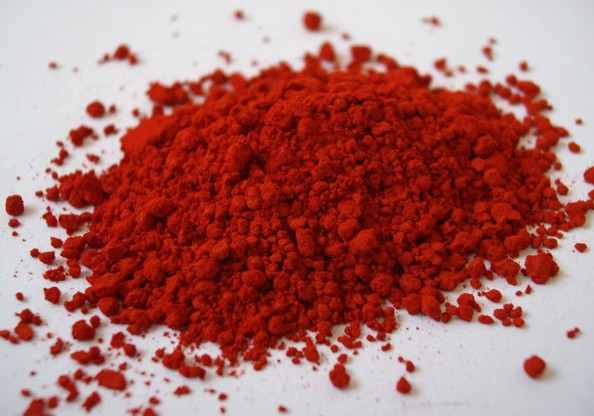
Sudan I - the dye banned from being used in KFC menu items

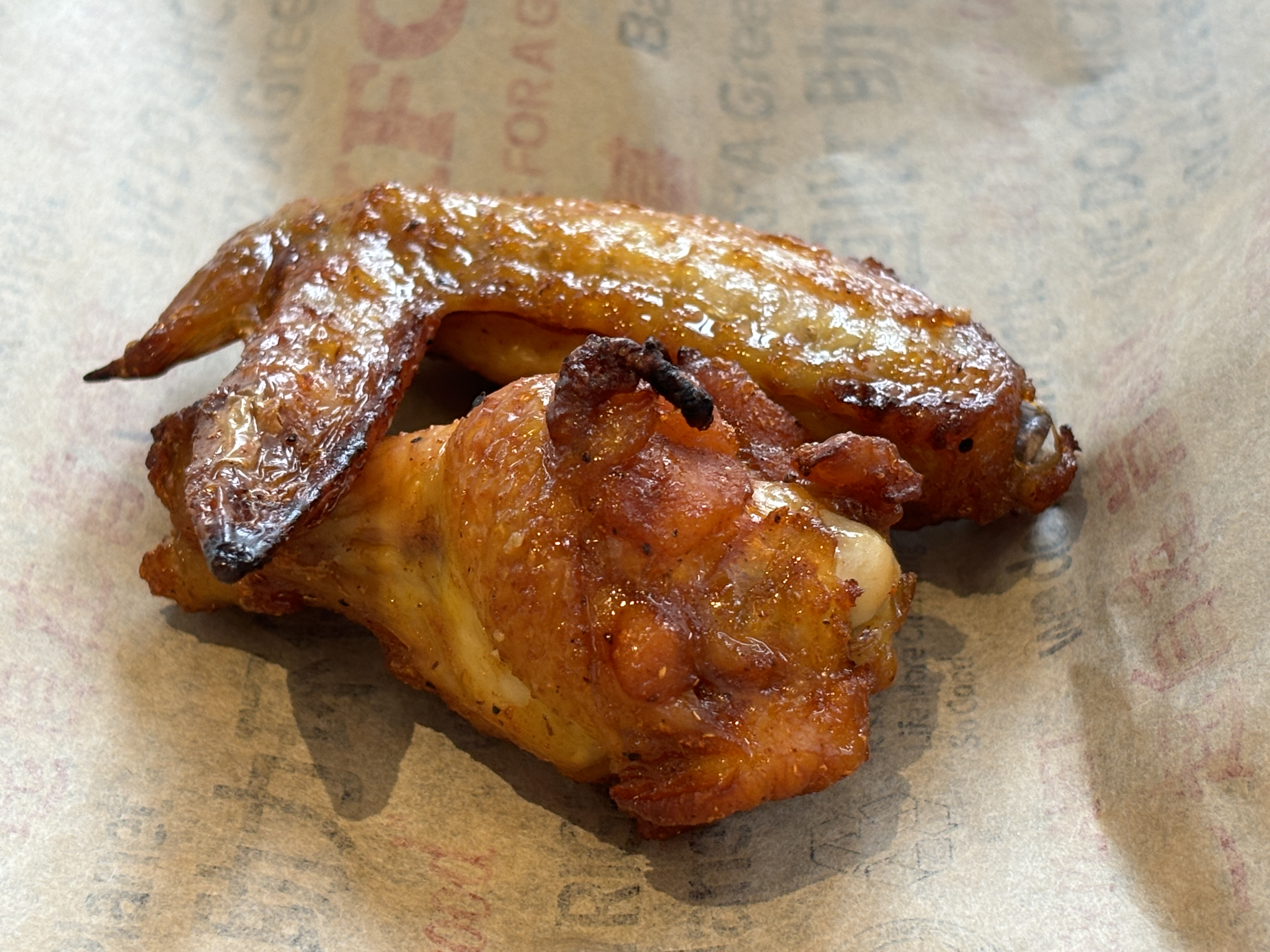
KFC China local-menu - New Orleans wings

In 2005, Sudan I (organic compound) was found in the spice pickle powder used in some KFC menu items. Affected items included spiced drumsticks, spiced chicken wings, popcorn chicken, and the "New Orleans Roasted Chicken". The discovery was made by quality inspection authorities in Zhejiang Province. Sudan I is an industrial dye used for coloring solvents, oil waxes, as well as shoes and floor polishes. It is not safe for use in foods because it increases the risk of cancer. The discovery led to the ban of all flavoring products made by Heinz-Meiweiyuan Food Co.

=== 2012–2014 supply issues ===
In December 2012, KFC faced allegations that some of its suppliers injected antiviral drugs and growth hormones into poultry in ways that violated food safety regulations. After this, the chain severed its relationship with 100 suppliers and agreed to "actively co-operate" with a government investigation into its use of antibiotics. KFC China sales in January 2013 were down 41% against the previous year. In May 2013, Businessweek speculated that KFC may be "losing its touch" in China. Sales continued to decline throughout 2013, albeit with a slower rate of decline than analysts estimated. Leslie Patton of Businessweek highlighted increased competition in the fast food category from competitors. To counter sluggish sales, the menu was revamped in 2014. In April 2014, Yum announced that first-quarter KFC sales had risen by 11% in China, following a 15% fall in 2013.

In July 2014, Chinese authorities closed down the Shanghai operations of the OSI Group, amidst allegations that it had supplied KFC with expired meat. Yum immediately terminated its contract with the supplier and stated that the revelation had led to a "significant [and] negative" decline in sales.

=== Since 2016 ===
Following the 2016 result of the South China Sea arbitration, KFC restaurants in Chinese cities became locations for public protests. Protestors denounced what they viewed as United States interference in China's sovereignty issues. Viewing KFC as symbolic of American presence in China, the protestors called for a boycott of the restaurant chain. These protests also became a focus for Little Pink, young online fandom nationalists.

== Impact in China ==
When KFC first arrived in China, it was not visited very frequently, but now the chain plays a crucial role in urban life. China's advertising market started growing significantly during the 1980s. With the growth of the ad market, brand names became a staple in China, increasing the recognition of large chains such as KFC. Television advertising helped spread brand recognition to even remote regions.

KFC has been credited with assisting globalization in China. The first KFC restaurants to open in China were considered a novelty, and attracted customers with an inspirational "Western lifestyle". China was also becoming more accepting of Western influences during this era. In turn, KFC competes against domestic rivals by offering an extended menu with localized food options.

KFC claims it invented the New Orleans-Style Chicken Wings recipe in 2004, a local invention that became a common dish in Chinese restaurants and is known nationally in China. The specific marinade is sold by the seasoning companies, such as McCormick and Tyson Foods, in the Chinese region.

== McDonald's versus KFC ==
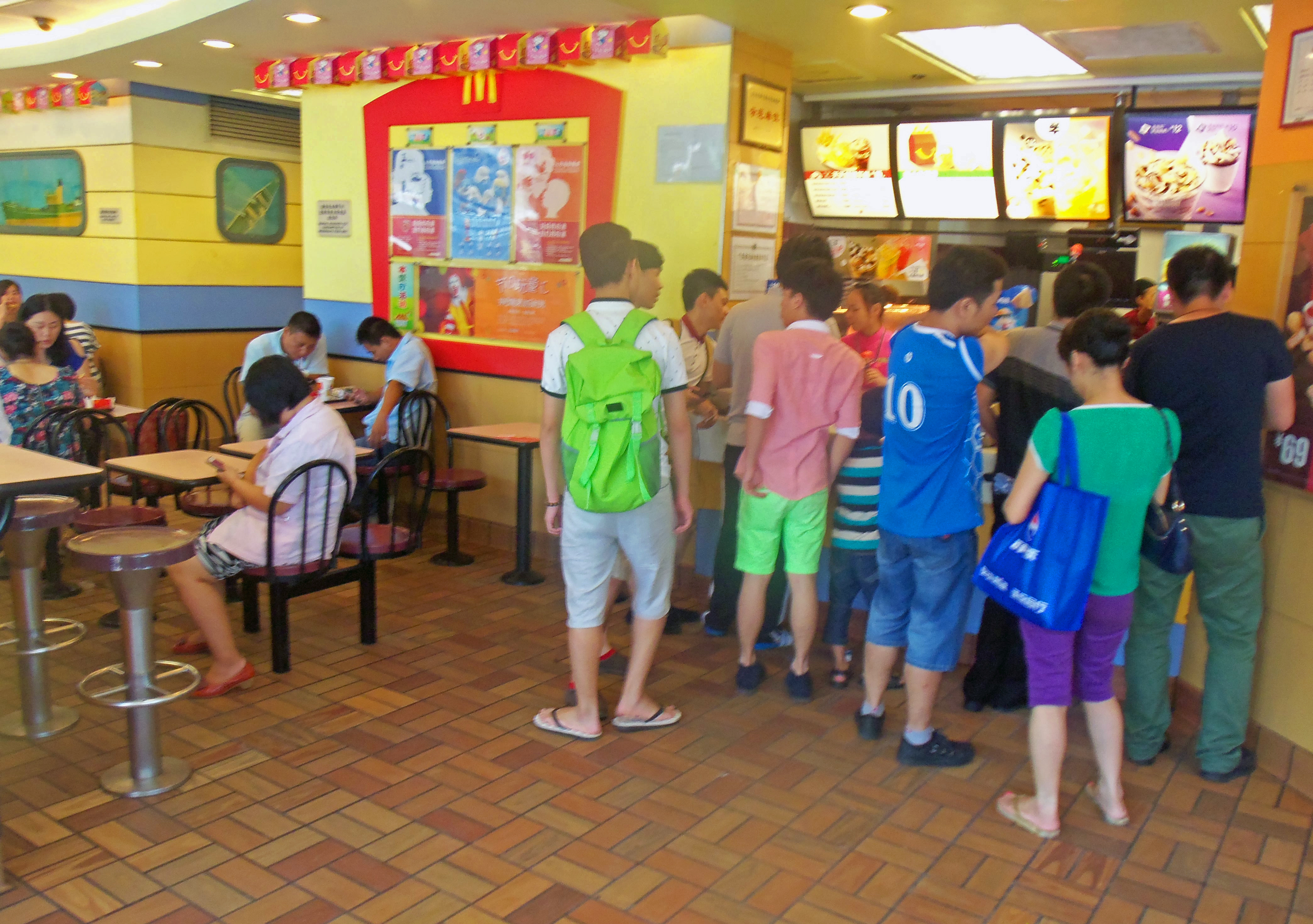
McDonald's in Shenzhen

KFC and McDonald's were the first American fast food companies to enter China during the 1980s, after foreign investments became more widely accepted under the economic reforms of Deng Xiaoping. McDonald's entered China in 1990, three years after KFC. Similarly to KFC, it adopted a joint venture with a state-owned enterprise, the Beijing Corporation of Farming Industry and Commerce. In 2006, China had the largest market of fast food consumers, with McDonald's and KFC together claiming over 90% of the market share.

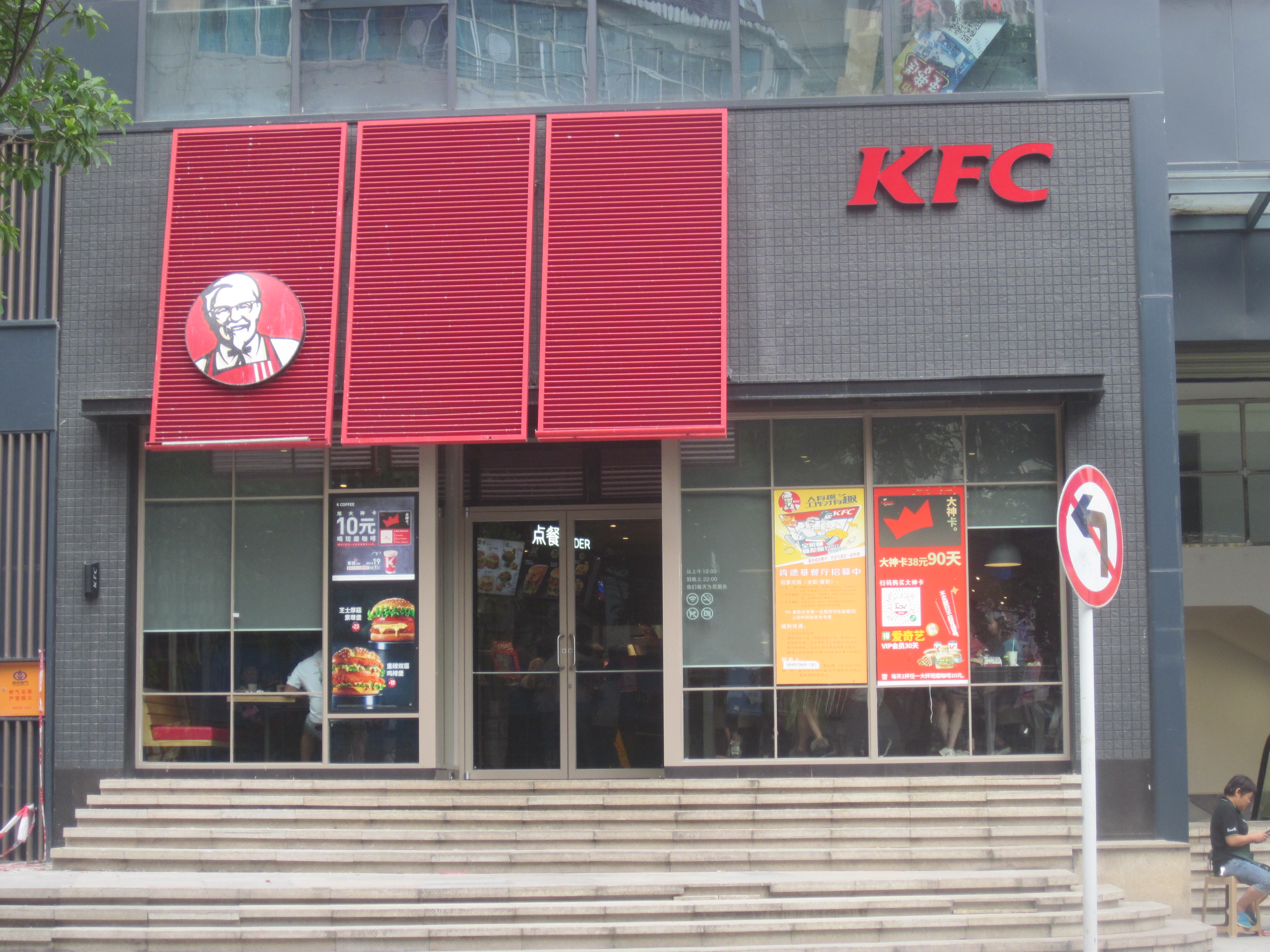
KFC in Paizhou

McDonald's aimed to make customers feel at home with their slogan, "Get together at McDonald’s; enjoy the happiness of family life". Despite a similar slogan working in the US, it failed to attract Chinese customers. Instead, KFC adopted traditional Chinese themes in their commercials.

In China, McDonald's is typically associated with western food, while KFC is considered more locally adapted. The two brands adopted different marketing strategies, with McDonald's appealing to modern tastes and purposely maintaining a foreign feel, and KFC adapting to local tastes and adapting to Chinese culture.

Comparison of McDonald's and KFC in China
| Indicators | McDonald's | KFC |
|---|---|---|
| Operational revenue in 2003 | RMB 5.3 bln | RMB 9.3 bln |
| Annual growth in 2003 | 17.78% | 31% |
| Total number of restaurants in 2004 | About 600 | About 1200 |
| Operational revenue per restaurant in 2002 | RMB 6 mln | RMB 8mln |
| Annual expansion speed | 25% (2002-4) | 70% (1997-2004) |

== Operations ==
The Zinger burger is the highest selling menu item. KFC has adapted its menu to suit local tastes, with items such as rice congee, egg custard tarts and tree fungus salad, with an average of 50 different menu items per store. Another item is the Dragon Twister, a wrap that includes fried chicken, cucumbers, scallions, and duck sauce, similar in preparation to Peking duck.

Chinese outlets are typically two to three times larger than American and European outlets; many are open 24 hours a day and provide home delivery, and two new menu items are released each month. 78% of Chinese sites are company-owned, compared to 11% internationally.
