= Yum China =

Multinational fast food company

Yum China Holdings, Inc.

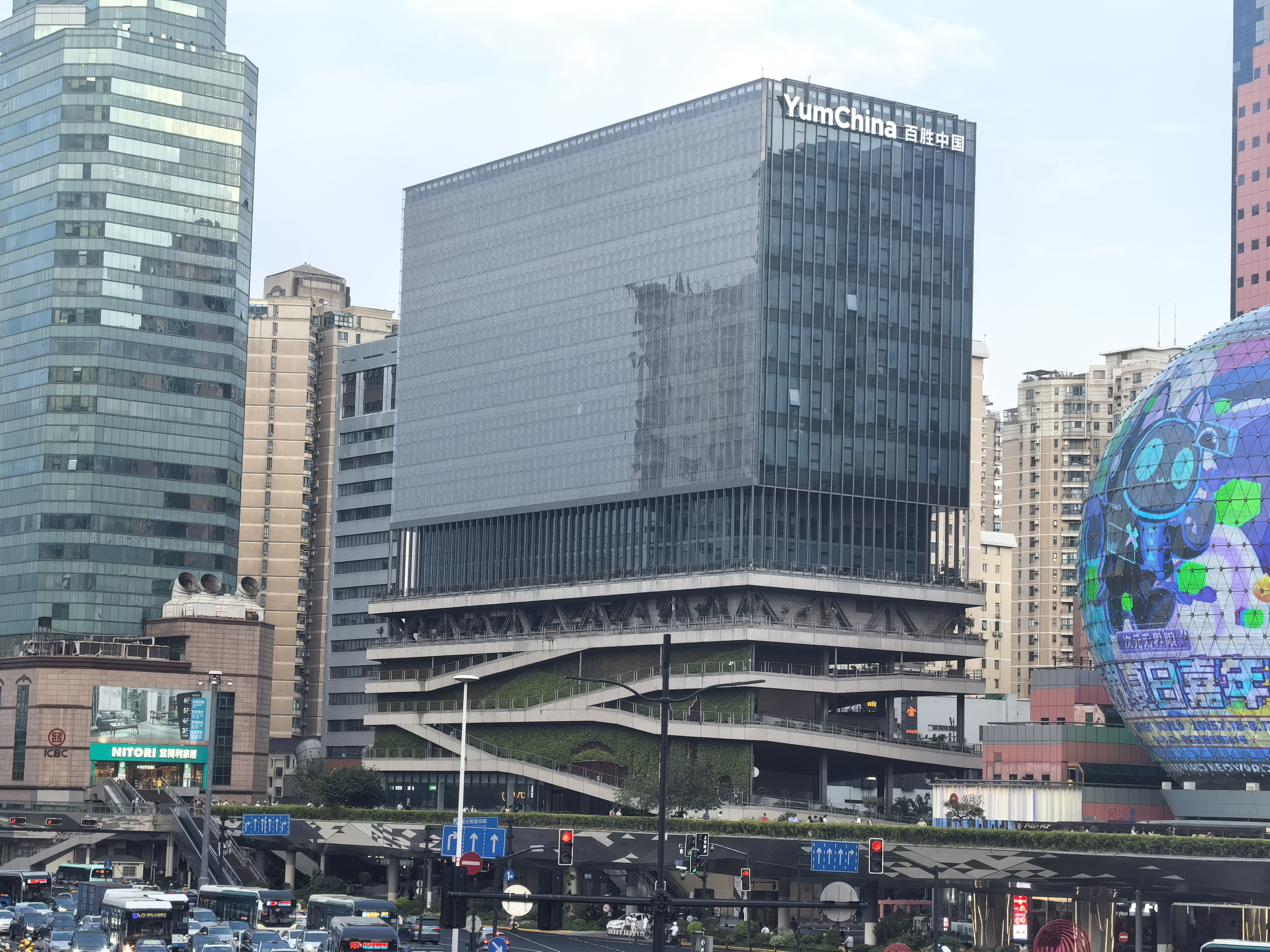
- Headquarters of Yum China at Xujiahui in Shanghai
- Type: Public
- Traded as: NYSE: YUMC; SEHK: 9987
- ISIN: US98850P1093
- Industry: Restaurant
- Predecessor: Yum! Brands
- Founded: November 1, 2016; 9 years ago
- Headquarters: Shanghai, China
- Number of locations: 18,737 (2026 Q1)
- Area served: China; Little Sheep: Canada, Japan, Indonesia, United States
- Key people: Joey Wat (CEO)
- Revenue: ▲US$11.797 billion (2025)
- Operating income: ▲US$1.29 billion (2025)
- Net income: ▲US$929 million (2025)
- Total assets: ▲US$$10.783 billion (2025)
- Total equity: ▲US$6.099 billion (2025)
- Number of employees: 290,000 (2025)
- Divisions: KFC China; Pizza Hut China; Taco Bell China; East Dawning; Little Sheep; Huang Ji Huang; COFFii & JOY; Lavazza China (65%); Shaofaner
- Website: yumchina.com

Yum China
- Traditional Chinese: 百勝中國控股有限公司
- Simplified Chinese: 百胜中国控股有限公司
Transcriptions
Standard Mandarin
- Hanyu Pinyin: Bǎishèng Zhōngguó Kònggǔ Yǒuxiàngōngsī

Yum China Holdings, Inc. (Chinese: 百胜中国; pinyin: Bǎishèng Zhōngguó) is a Chinese Fortune 500 fast-food restaurant company based in Shanghai, China. With US$11.797 billion in revenue and 18,737 restaurants worldwide it is one of the largest restaurant companies. It was spun off from Yum! Brands in 2016, becoming an independent, publicly traded company on November 1, 2016. Yum China is a trademark licensee of Yum Brands, paying 3% of total systemwide sales to Yum Brands. It operates 8,484 restaurants in over 1,100 cities located in every province and autonomous region in mainland China. It has a workforce of 290,000 employees. Since the stock is listed on the New York Stock Exchange, the company has an office in Plano, Texas, for SEC filings.

== History ==
=== Spinoff ===
On October 25, 2015, Yum! Brands announced that it intended to separate into two independent, publicly traded companies by spinning off Yum China; it took effect on November 1, 2016.

=== Brands ===
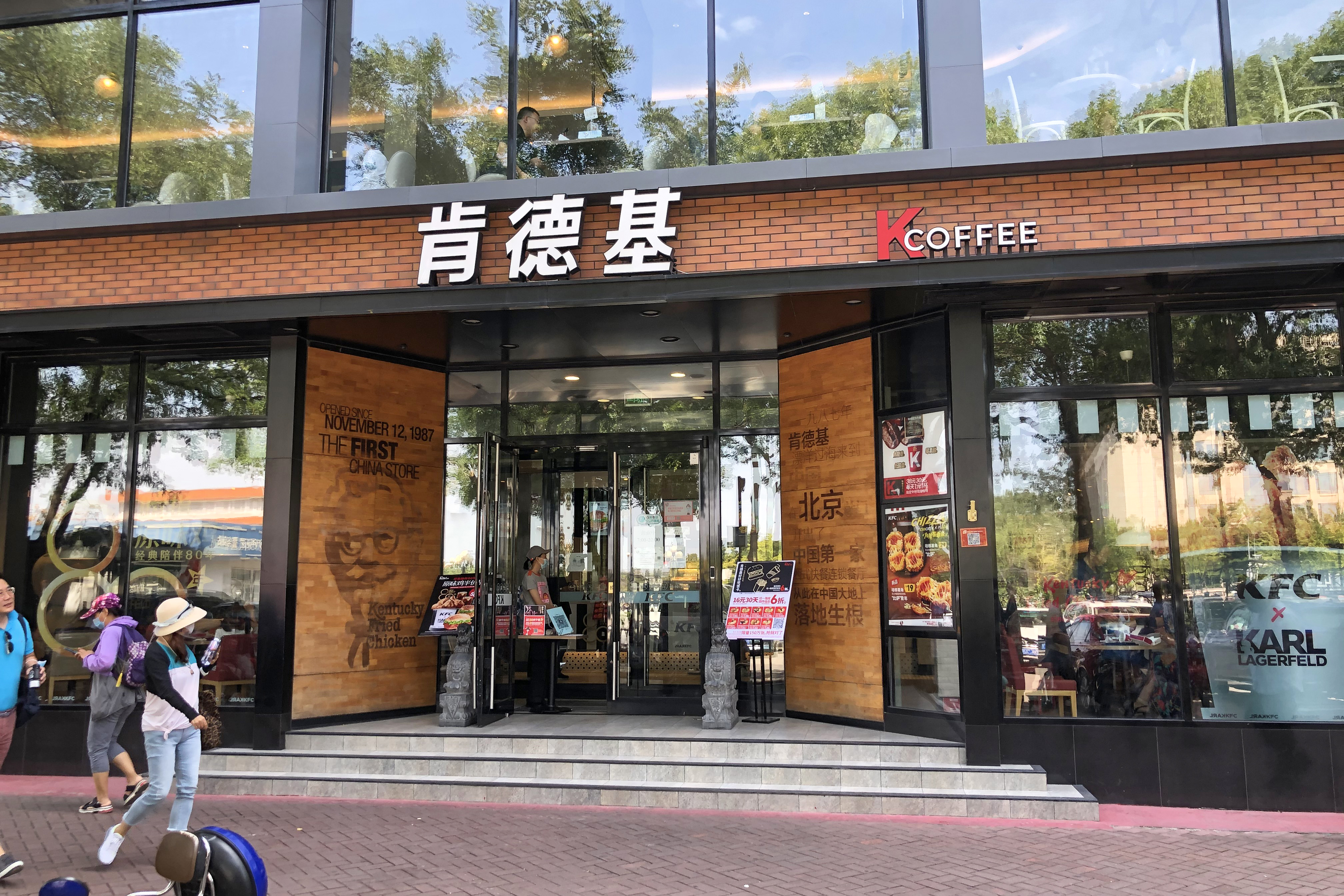
China's first KFC restaurant at Qianmen, Beijing

Yum China has several subsidiary brands, including KFC, Taco Bell, Pizza Hut, COFFii & JOY (a coffee bar launched in 2018), Huang Ji Huang (a casual dining franchise), and Little Sheep. Little Sheep has around 200 restaurants in China, thirty in eleven US states (most of which have been rebranded to Happy Lamb), mostly in California, seventeen in Japan, nine in Canada and one in Jakarta, Indonesia.

Yum China, alongside LongRange Capital, acquired Pizza Hut from Yum! Brands in 2026, Yum China acquired its Chinese operations.

Number of units as of 2024:

- 11,648 KFCs
- 3,724 Pizza Huts
- 1,023 Little Sheep, East Dawning, Taco Bell, Huang Ji Huang, COFFii & Joy, Lavazza, and Shaofaner.

== Corporate affairs ==
The headquarters is in the Yum China Building (Chinese: 百胜中国大厦; pinyin: Bǎishèng Zhōngguó Dàxià) in Xuhui District.
