= Levesville-la-Chenard =

- Commune
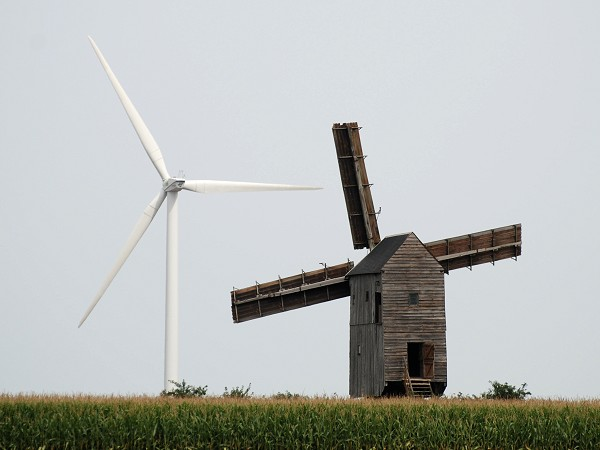
- Windmills in Levesville-la-Chenard
- Location of Levesville-la-Chenard
- Location within France Location within Centre-Val de Loire
- Coordinates: 48°18′09″N 1°49′37″E
- Country: France
- Region: Centre-Val de Loire
- Department: Eure-et-Loir
- Arrondissement: Chartres
- Canton: Les Villages Vovéens
- Intercommunality: Cœur de Beauce

Government
  - Mayor (2020–2026): Benoît Morin
- Area^{1}: 13.89 km^{2} (5.36 sq mi)
- Elevation: 145 m (476 ft)
- Highest elevation: 149 m (489 ft)
- Lowest elevation: 136 m (446 ft)
- Population (2023): 229
  - Density: 16.5/km^{2} (42.7/sq mi)
- Time zone: UTC+01:00 (CET)
  - Summer (DST): UTC+02:00 (CEST)
- INSEE/Postal code: 28210 /28310
- ^{1} French Land Register data, which excludes lakes, ponds, glaciers > 1 km^{2} (0.386 sq mi or 247 acres) and river estuaries.

Levesville-la-Chenard is a commune in the Eure-et-Loir department in northern France.

== Population ==
Historical population
Year	Pop.	±% p.a.
1968	198	—
1975	185	−0.97%
1982	197	+0.90%
1990	216	+1.16%
1999	208	−0.42%
2007	222	+0.82%
2012	217	−0.45%
2017	218	+0.09%
2023	229	+0.82%
Source: INSEE

== See also ==
- Communes of the Eure-et-Loir department
