= St. Paul's School (Lam Tin) =

St Paul's School (Lam Tin)

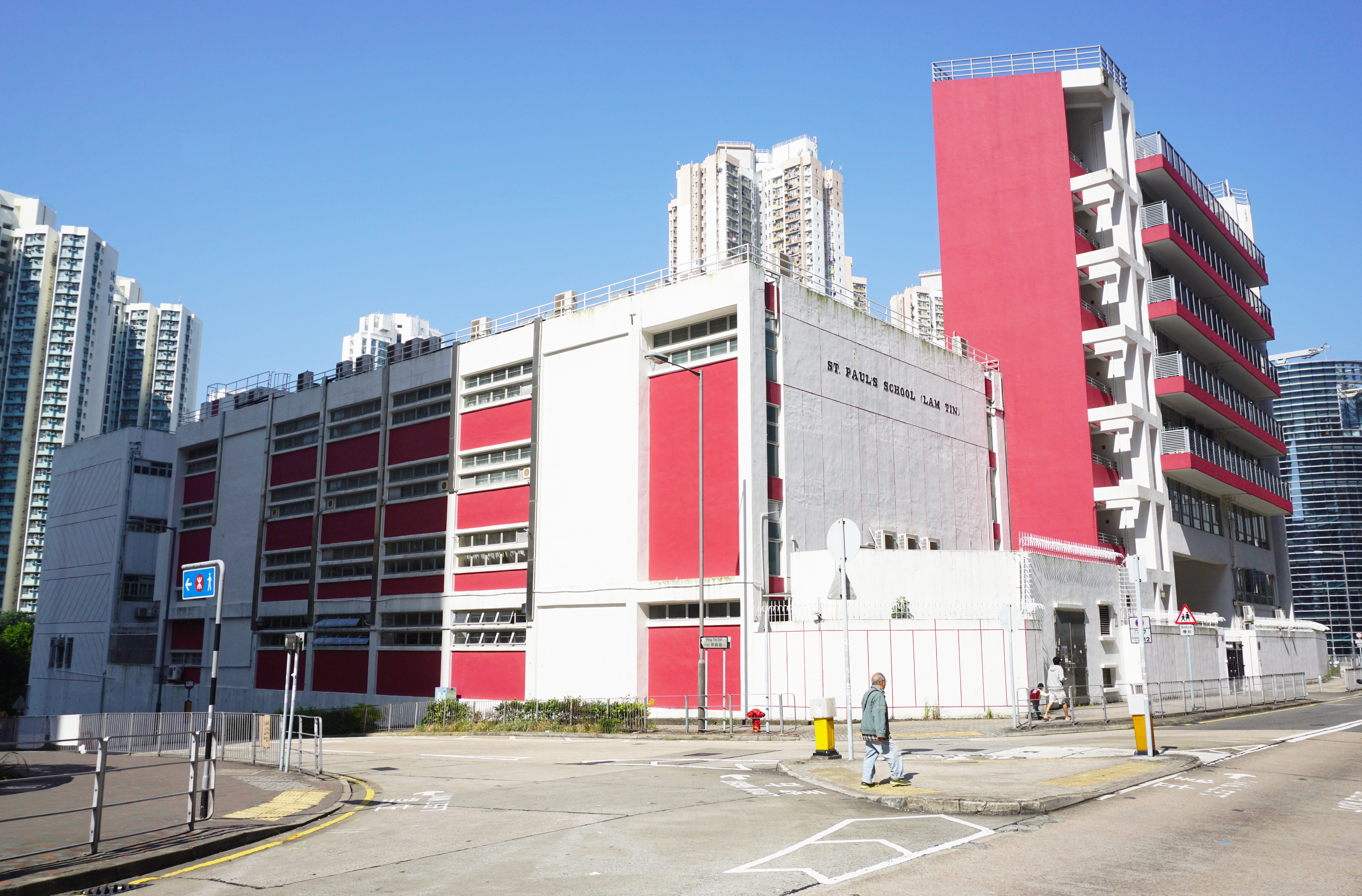
- St. Paul's School (Lam Tin)

Location
- 10 On Tin Street, Lam Tin, Kowloon; Hong Kong
- 22.3088°N 114.2376°E

Information
- Type: Catholic all-girls secondary school
- Motto: Omnia omnibus (Latin) (All things to all people)
- Religious affiliations: Roman Catholic (Sisters of St. Paul de Chartres)
- Established: 1970
- Chairman: Sr Joanna Marie Cheung, SPC
- Director: Dr Kelvin Wong
- Principal: Ms M.T. Wong
- Supervisor: Sr Joanna Marie Cheung, SPC
- Faculty: 64
- Enrollment: 1200
- Nickname: Paulinians
- Patron saint: St Paul
- Alma Mater song: School Hymn
- Sporting affiliations: Hong Kong Schools Sports Federation; South China Athletic Association (SCAA)
- Website: http://www.spslt.edu.hk/

St. Paul's School (Lam Tin) (Chinese: 藍田聖保祿中學) is a Catholic all-girls secondary school run by the Sisters of St. Paul de Chartres in Lam Tin, Kowloon Hong Kong. It was established in 1970. The school's patron saint is St. Paul (Lam Tin).

All thirty classrooms are equipped with a class library. The multi-media learning centre, computer-assisted learning centre, study room and school library are open to students during school and non-school days. Other facilities include two tutorial rooms, four science laboratories, a music room, an art room, a cookery room, and a needlework room.
