= St. Paul College of Ilocos Sur =

Roman Catholic college in Ilocos Sur, Philippines

- Former names: Girls College of Our Lady of the Rosary (1905–1961); Rosary College of Vigan (1961–1969)
- Motto: Caritas Christi Urget Nos (Latin)
- Motto in English: The love of Christ urges us
- Type: Private Roman Catholic non-profit coeducational basic and higher education institution
- Established: 1905; 121 years ago
- Founder: Congregation of the Sisters of St. Paul of Chartres
- Religious affiliation: Roman Catholic (Sisters of Saint Paul)
- Academic affiliations: PAASCU
- President: Sr. Ma. Nilda Masirag, SPC
- Vice-president: List: Sr. Elizabeth Mata, SPC (VP for Finance and Admin); Sr.Jennifer Dayday, SPC (VP for Christian Formation); Henry Buemio, EdD (VP for Academics)
- Principal: Sr. Angeles Ilagan, SPC (Basic Education)
- Director: Sr. Elizabeth Mata, SPC (Human Resource)
- Location: St. Paul Ave., Bayubay, San Vicente, Ilocos Sur, Philippines; 17°34′49″N 120°23′09″E
- Alma Mater song: Paulinian Hymn
- Colors: Green and Gold
- Nickname: Paulinians
- Website: www.spcis.edu.ph
- Location in Luzon Location in the Philippines

Saint Paul College of Ilocos Sur, also referred to by its acronym SPCIS or SPC Ilocos Sur, is a private Catholic basic and higher education institution run by the Sisters of St. Paul of Chartres (SPC) in Bayubay, San Vicente, Ilocos Sur. It is the second oldest private school in Ilocos Sur, Philippines and is a member school of the St. Paul University System. It was founded by the Sisters of St. Paul of Chartres in 1905, thus the second oldest school in the St. Paul University System and one of the seven campuses comprising the system as well.

It is one of the 40 schools owned, managed, and operated by the Sisters of St. Paul of Chartres (SPC) in the Philippines.

== History ==
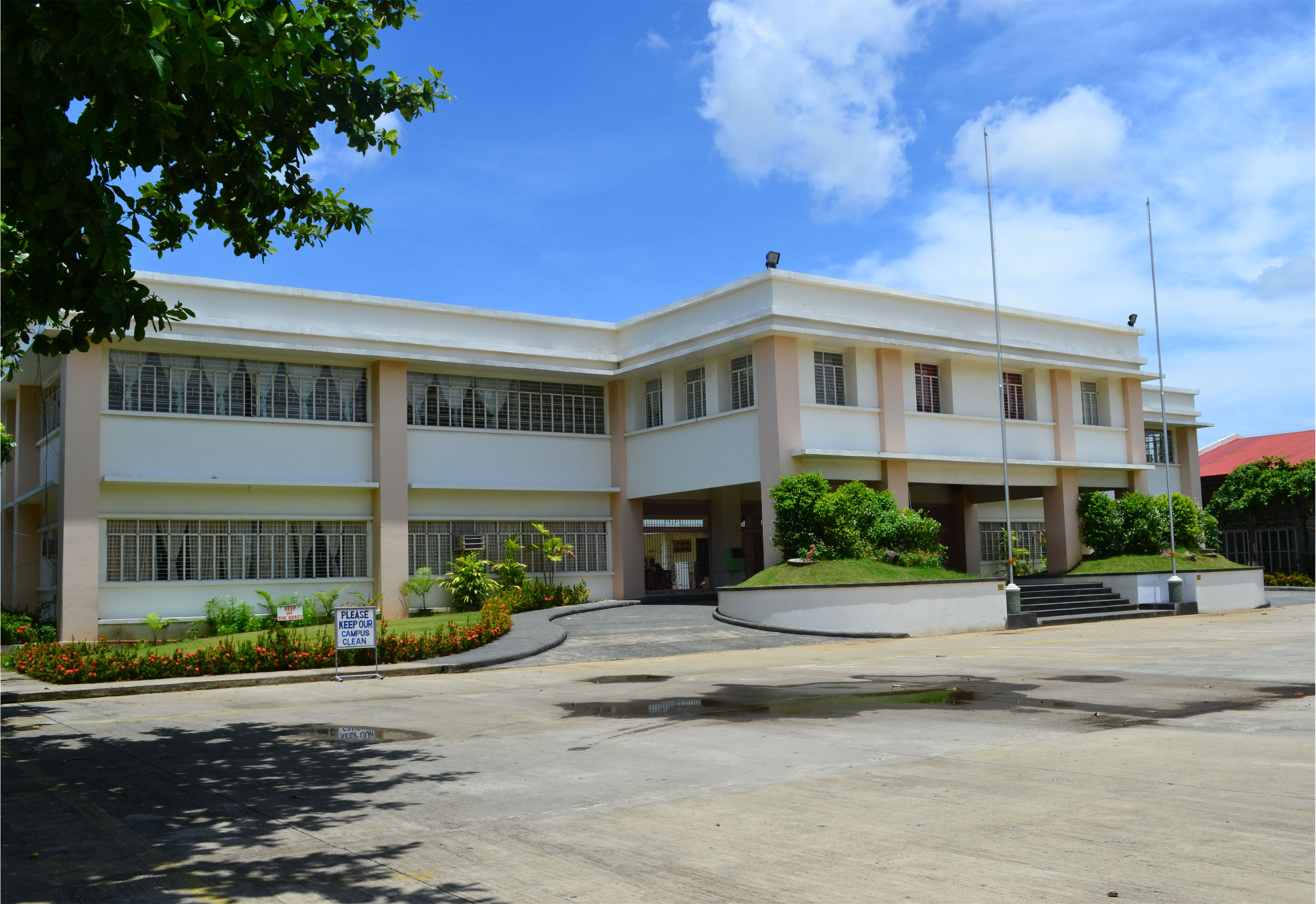
The Our Lady of the Holy Rosary Building

The school was originally established in Vigan, Ilocos Sur, in 1905 by the Sisters of St. Paul of Chartres. In 1911, it was incorporated as the "Girls College of Our Lady of the Rosary." Secondary Education was introduced in 1912, a Junior Normal College was started in 1946, providing courses in the Liberal Arts, an Elementary course in Piano (1950), and a four-year Bachelor of Science in Elementary Education.

In 1961 the name became "Rosary College of Vigan, Incorporated" and in 1969, "St. Paul College of Ilocos Sur." Male students were first accepted in the College Department in 1965. The school expanded to a new site in Barangay Bayubay, in the nearby municipality of San Vicente.

On June 29, 2010, St. Paul University System incorporated St. Paul College of Ilocos Sur as an affiliate member of the SPUS whose other members are St. Paul University Philippines at Tuguegarao City, St. Paul University Dumaguete, St. Paul University Iloilo, St. Paul University Manila, St. Paul University Quezon City, and St. Paul University Surigao.

== Academic programs ==
=== Graduate school ===
There are post graduate programs in Business, Education, and Information Technology. These consist of onsite and online classes.

=== College ===
Department of Arts, Sciences and Teacher Education

- Bachelor of Arts (AB) with majors in English, Mathematics, Filipino, and Religious Education
- Bachelor of Elementary Education (BEEd)
- Bachelor of Secondary Education (BSEd) with majors in Biological Sciences, English, Mathematics, Filipino, Home Economics, and Religious Education

Department of Nursing

- Bachelor of Science in Nursing (BSN)

Department of Business Education

- Bachelor of Science in Accountancy (BSA)
- Bachelor of Science in Business Administration (BSBA) major in Financial Management and Human Resources Management
- Bachelor of Science in Entrepreneurship (BSEntrepreneur)
- Bachelor of Science in Information Technology (BSIT)

Department of Hospitality and Tourism Management

- Bachelor of Science in Hospitality Management (BSHM)
- Bachelor of Science in Tourism Management (BSTM)
- Associate in Hotel and Restaurant Services (HRS)
- Associate in Tourism

=== Senior High School ===
Academic Track

- Accountancy, Business, and Management (ABM)
- General Academics Strand (GAS)
- Humanities and Social Sciences (HumSS)
- Science, Technology, Engineering, and Mathematics (STEM)

Technical-Vocational Track

- Food and Beverages Services
- Information Technology
- Local Guiding Services

=== Junior high school ===
- Special Science High School Curriculum
- Grade 7-10

=== Grade School ===
- Kindergarten
- Grades 1 to 6

=== ECA ===
- MTG, ICAS, AMC, IMAS, MTAP

=== School Accreditation ===
(PAASCU Accredited Level III)

- Grade School
- High School Department

(PAASCU Re-Accredited Level II)

- College Department - Department of Arts, Sciences and Teacher Education

== See also ==
- St. Paul University Philippines, Tuguegarao City
- St. Paul University Manila, Metro Manila
- St. Paul University Quezon City, Metro Manila
- St. Paul University at San Miguel, Bulacan
- St. Paul University Dumaguete, Negros Oriental
- St. Paul University Iloilo, Iloilo City
- St. Paul University Surigao, Surigao del Norte
