= San Vicente, Ilocos Sur =

Municipality in Ilocos Sur, Philippines

San Vicente
- Municipality
- Municipality of San Vicente
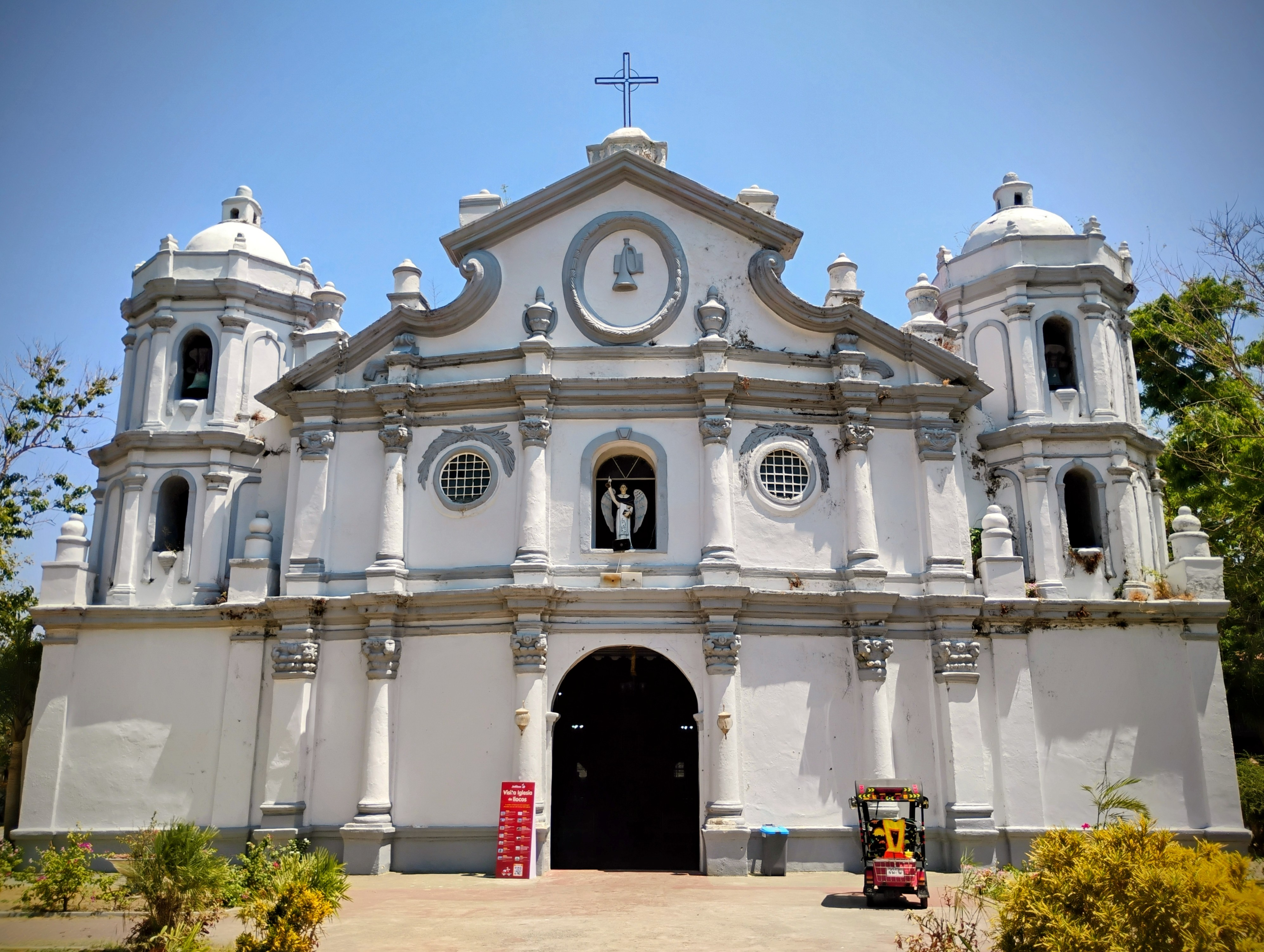
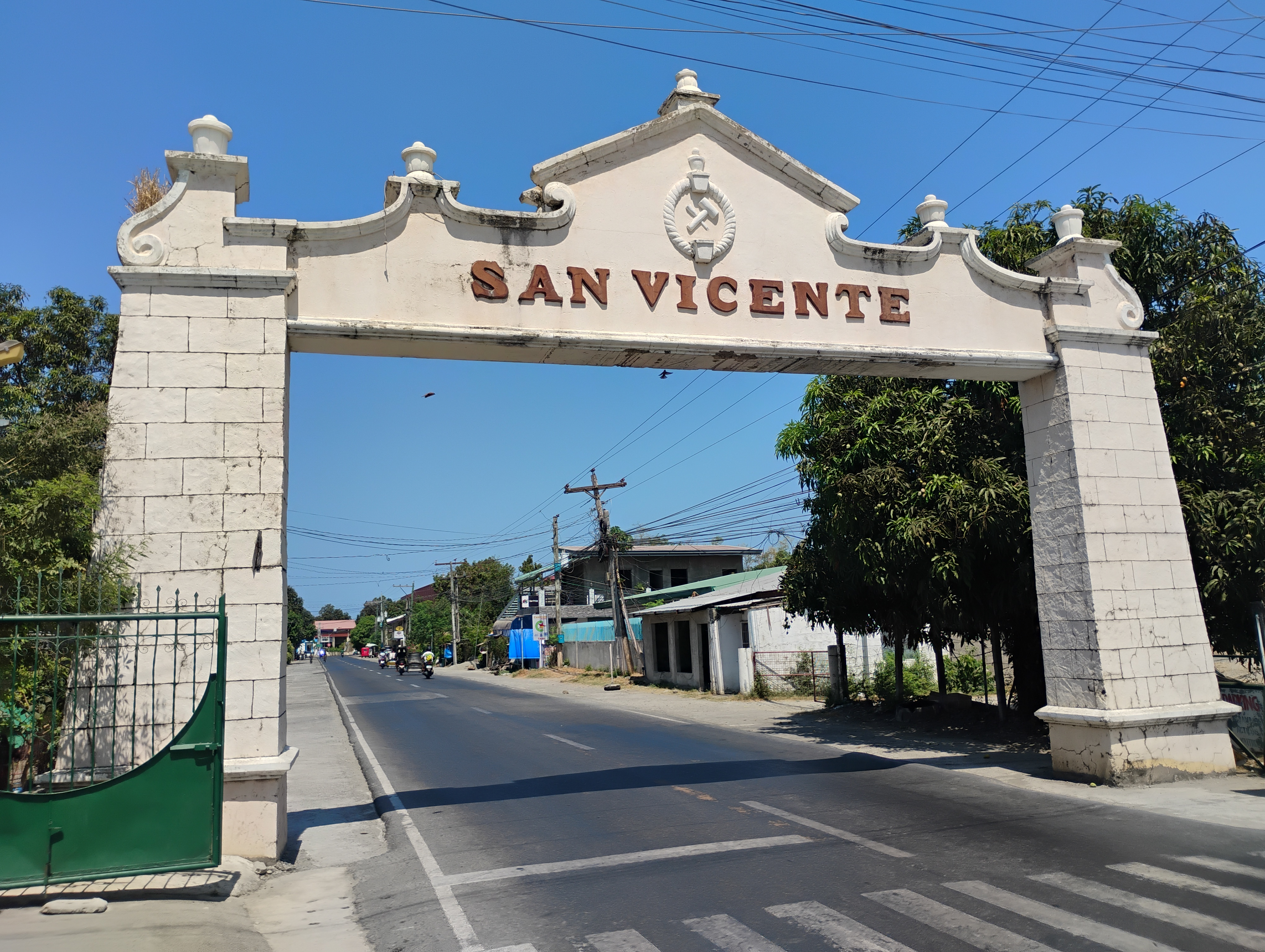
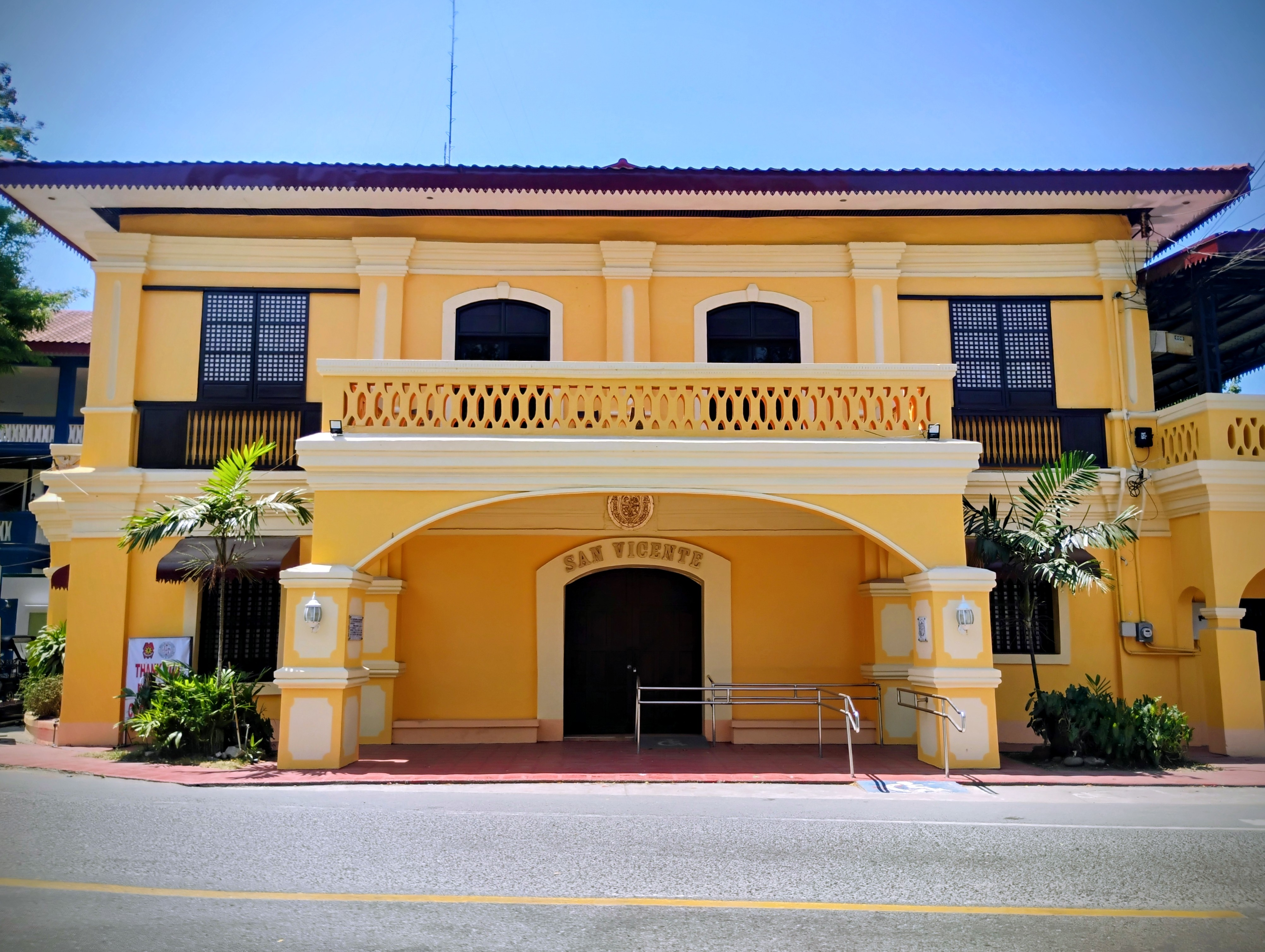
- San Vicente Church San Vicente Welcome Arch San Vicente Municipal Hall

- Seal
- Nickname: Furniture Capital of the North
- Motto: Tignay San Vicente
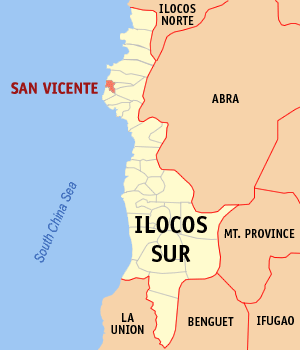
- Map of Ilocos Sur with San Vicente highlighted
- Interactive map of San Vicente
- Location within the Philippines
- Coordinates: 17°35′41″N 120°22′31″E
- Country: Philippines
- Region: Ilocos Region
- Province: Ilocos Sur
- District: 1st district
- Named for: St. Vincent Ferrer
- Barangays: 7 (see Barangays)

Government
  - Type: Sangguniang Bayan
  - Mayor: Jose C. Tabanda III
  - Vice Mayor: Maria Nancy D. Tabanda
  - Representative: Deogracias Victor B. Savellano
  - Municipal Council: Members: Rosamante L. Reyes; Conrado R. Rojo; Dionisio R. Palado; Jun R. Rola; Juanito R. Ragil; Renato T. Rojas; Reynaldo R. Riberal; Dalmacio T. Rubia
  - Electorate: 9,288 voters (2025)

Area
  - Total: 12.60 km^{2} (4.86 sq mi)
- Elevation: 7.0 m (23.0 ft)
- Highest elevation: 44 m (144 ft)
- Lowest elevation: 0 m (0 ft)

Population (2024 census)
  - Total: 13,074
  - Density: 1,038/km^{2} (2,687/sq mi)
  - Households: 3,229

Economy
  - Income class: 3rd municipal income class
  - Poverty incidence: 4.71% (2023)
  - Revenue: ₱ 225.2 million (2024)
  - Assets: ₱ 531.1 million (2024)
  - Expenditure: ₱ 113.6 million (2024)
  - Liabilities: ₱ 27.26 million (2024)

Service provider
  - Electricity: Ilocos Sur Electric Cooperative (ISECO)
- Time zone: UTC+8 (PST)
- ZIP code: 2726
- PSGC: 0102921000
- IDD : area code: +63 (0)77
- Native languages: Ilocano; Tagalog

San Vicente, officially the Municipality of San Vicente (Ilocano: Ili ti San Vicente; Filipino: Bayan ng San Vicente), is a municipality in the province of Ilocos Sur, Philippines. According to the 2024 census, it has a population of 13,074 people.

== Etymology ==
The municipality's name came from the name of Saint Vincent Ferrer, whose winged statue was found inside a box entangled in fishing nets. The fishermen consulted this matter to the friars in Villa Fernandina (now Vigan), who identified the person depicted by the statue. The statue was carried to the town's center, where a church was built. From then on, the town formerly known as Tuanong (sometimes called Taonan) was renamed San Vicente.

== History ==
In tracing the history of San Vicente, one always has to start from Vigan. Vigan was established by the Spanish conquistador, Juan de Salcedo on June 13, 1573.

Upon Salcedo's return in 1574, he brought with them the Augustinian friars in order to proselytize Christianity among the inhabitants. After Salcedo's death on March 11, 1576, Franciscan friars replaced the Augustinians in 1579. These same friars spread up to San Vicente to convert the people to the Catholic faith.

Up until 1582, there were only about 800 residents in Vigan. In 1591, Vigan began to organize its government, which included the barrios of Tuanong, Santa Catalina de Baba, and Caoayan. There were then a population numbering about 4,000 inhabitants at this time.

Between the years 1720 and 1737, the first chapel of Barrio Tuanong was erected. Later in 1748, the Confraternity of Jesus of Nazareth was organized. In one record of the Vigan Convent archives, a funeral that took place on January 29, 1748 in the chapel of Barrio Tuanong was recorded. Two chaplains, Don Agustin de la Encarnacion and Don Pedro Geronimo de Barba, were the priests of the chapel in that year. It is believed that the chapel is the first stone building that one sees upon entering the San Vicente Central School from the main road.

On June 16, 1751, the chaplain was Don Miguel de Montanez. He was the first priest there and also in the then newly constructed chapel of San Sebastian.

Difficulties in reaching Barrio Tuanong and Barrio Santa Catalina de Baba from Vigan especially during the months of June to October were experienced due to the absence of a dike or bridge. Priests from Vigan reached these areas by means of a raft. The problem prompted the separation of these two barrios from Vigan in 1793.

In 1795, the seat of the municipality and the church in Barrio Tuanong were inaugurated, and the town became known as San Vicente. Don Pedro de Leon was the first parish priest and he was believed as the initiator of the construction of the Church of San Vicente.

The 1818 Spanish census showed San Vicente had 2,113 native families co-progressing with 10 Spanish-Filipino families.

== Geography ==
San Vicente is situated 3.33 kilometres (2.07 mi) from the provincial capital Vigan, and 405.53 kilometres (251.98 mi) from the country's capital city of Manila.

Poblacion Barangay Hall

=== Barangays ===
San Vicente is politically subdivided into 7 barangays. Each barangay consists of puroks and some have sitios.

- Bantaoay
- Bayubay Norte
- Bayubay Sur
- Lubong
- Poblacion
- Pudoc
- San Sebastian

=== Climate ===
Climate data for San Vicente, Ilocos Sur
| Month | Jan | Feb | Mar | Apr | May | Jun | Jul | Aug | Sep | Oct | Nov | Dec | Year |
|---|---|---|---|---|---|---|---|---|---|---|---|---|---|
| Mean daily maximum °C (°F) | 30 (86) | 31 (88) | 33 (91) | 34 (93) | 33 (91) | 31 (88) | 30 (86) | 30 (86) | 30 (86) | 31 (88) | 30 (86) | 29 (84) | 31 (88) |
| Mean daily minimum °C (°F) | 19 (66) | 19 (66) | 21 (70) | 23 (73) | 25 (77) | 25 (77) | 24 (75) | 24 (75) | 24 (75) | 22 (72) | 21 (70) | 19 (66) | 22 (72) |
| Average precipitation mm (inches) | 9 (0.4) | 11 (0.4) | 13 (0.5) | 23 (0.9) | 92 (3.6) | 122 (4.8) | 153 (6.0) | 137 (5.4) | 139 (5.5) | 141 (5.6) | 42 (1.7) | 14 (0.6) | 896 (35.4) |
| Average rainy days | 4.6 | 4.0 | 6.2 | 9.1 | 19.5 | 23.2 | 24.0 | 22.5 | 21.5 | 15.2 | 10.5 | 6.0 | 166.3 |
Source: Meteoblue (modeled/calculated data, not measured locally)

== Demographics ==
Population census of San Vicente

| Year | Pop. | ±% p.a. |
|---|---|---|
| 1903 | 5,060 | — |
| 1918 | 5,858 | +0.98% |
| 1939 | 6,163 | +0.24% |
| 1948 | 6,151 | −0.02% |
| 1960 | 7,094 | +1.20% |
| 1970 | 7,539 | +0.61% |

| Year | Pop. | ±% p.a. |
|---|---|---|
| 1975 | 8,299 | +1.94% |
| 1980 | 8,488 | +0.45% |
| 1990 | 9,989 | +1.64% |
| 1995 | 9,848 | −0.27% |
| 2000 | 10,877 | +2.15% |
| 2007 | 11,907 | +1.26% |

| Year | Pop. | ±% p.a. |
|---|---|---|
| 2010 | 11,720 | −0.57% |
| 2015 | 12,758 | +1.63% |
| 2020 | 13,118 | +0.59% |
| 2024 | 13,074 | −0.08% |

Source: Philippine Statistics Authority

In the 2024 census, San Vicente had a population of 13,074 people. The population density was 1,000 inhabitants per square kilometre (2,600/sq mi).

== Economy ==
Poverty incidence of San Vicente (%)

Source: Philippine Statistics Authority

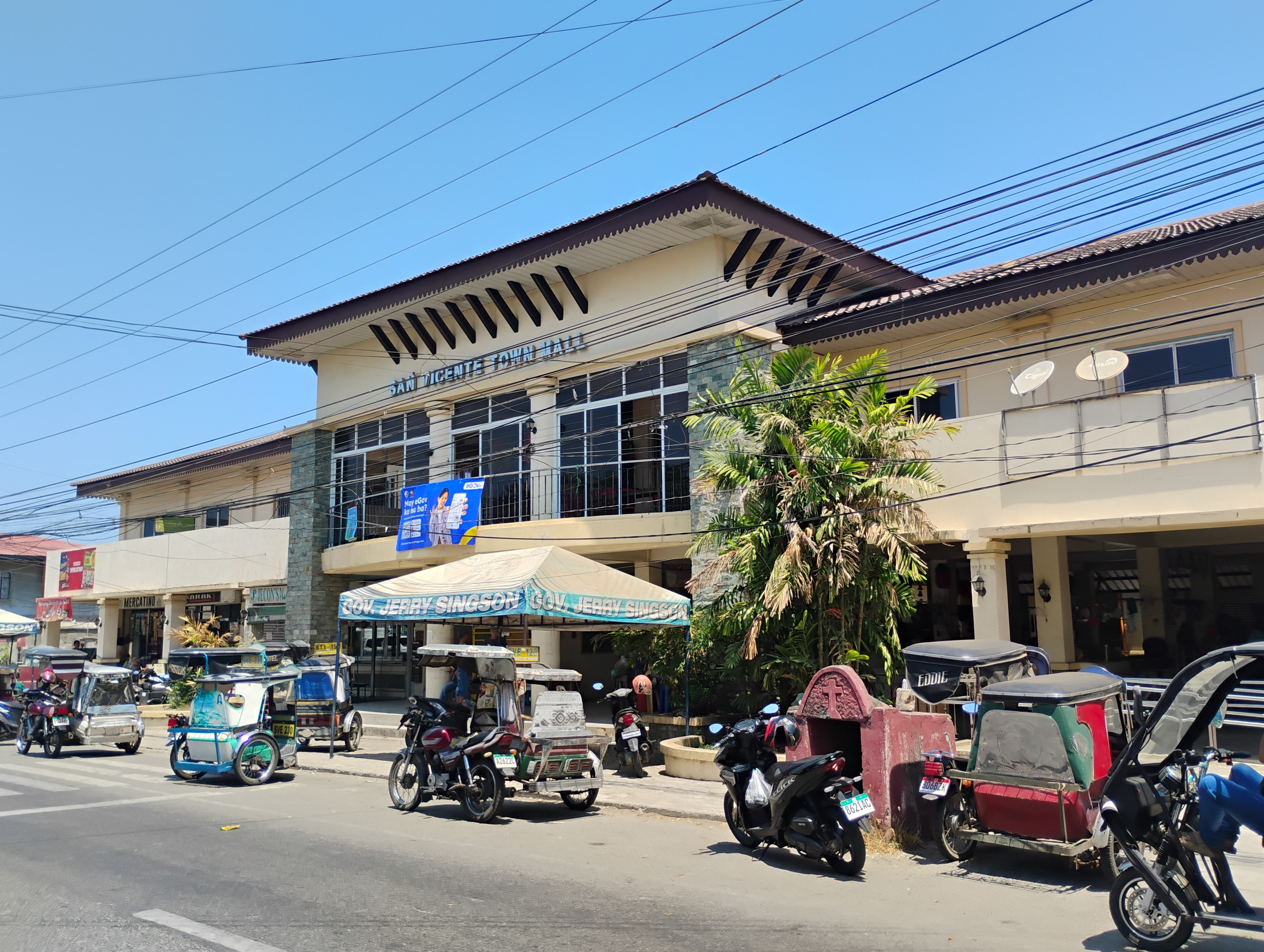
San Vicente Town Mall

The municipality is known for its production of beautiful furniture made from narra and other tropical hardwoods, even from old wood previously used in wooden sugarcane crushers and old houses to make reproduction antiques.

== Government ==
=== Local government ===
San Vicente, belonging to the first congressional district of the province of Ilocos Sur, is governed by a mayor designated as its local chief executive and by a municipal council as its legislative body in accordance with the Local Government Code. The mayor, vice mayor, and the councilors are elected directly by the people through an election which is being held every three years.

=== Elected officials ===
Members of the Municipal Council (2019–2022)
| Position | Name |
|---|---|
| Congressman | Deogracias Victor B. Savellano |
| Mayor | Jonan D. Tabanda |
| Vice-Mayor | Jose C. Tabanda III |
| Councilors | Rosamante L. Reyes |
| Councilors | Conrado R. Rojo |
| Councilors | Dionisio R. Palado |
| Councilors | Jun R. Rola |
| Councilors | Juanito R. Ragil |
| Councilors | Renato T. Rojas |
| Councilors | Reynaldo R. Riberal |
| Councilors | Dalmacio T. Rubia |

== Education ==
The San Vicente Schools District Office governs all educational institutions within the municipality.

=== Primary and elementary schools ===
- Bayubay Elementary School
- Mindoro Primary School
- Nagtupacan Elementary School
- Pudoc Elementary School
- San Sebastian Elementary School
- San Vicente Baptist Bible Academy (Elementary)
- San Vicente Integrated School (Elementary)
- St. Paul College (Elementary)

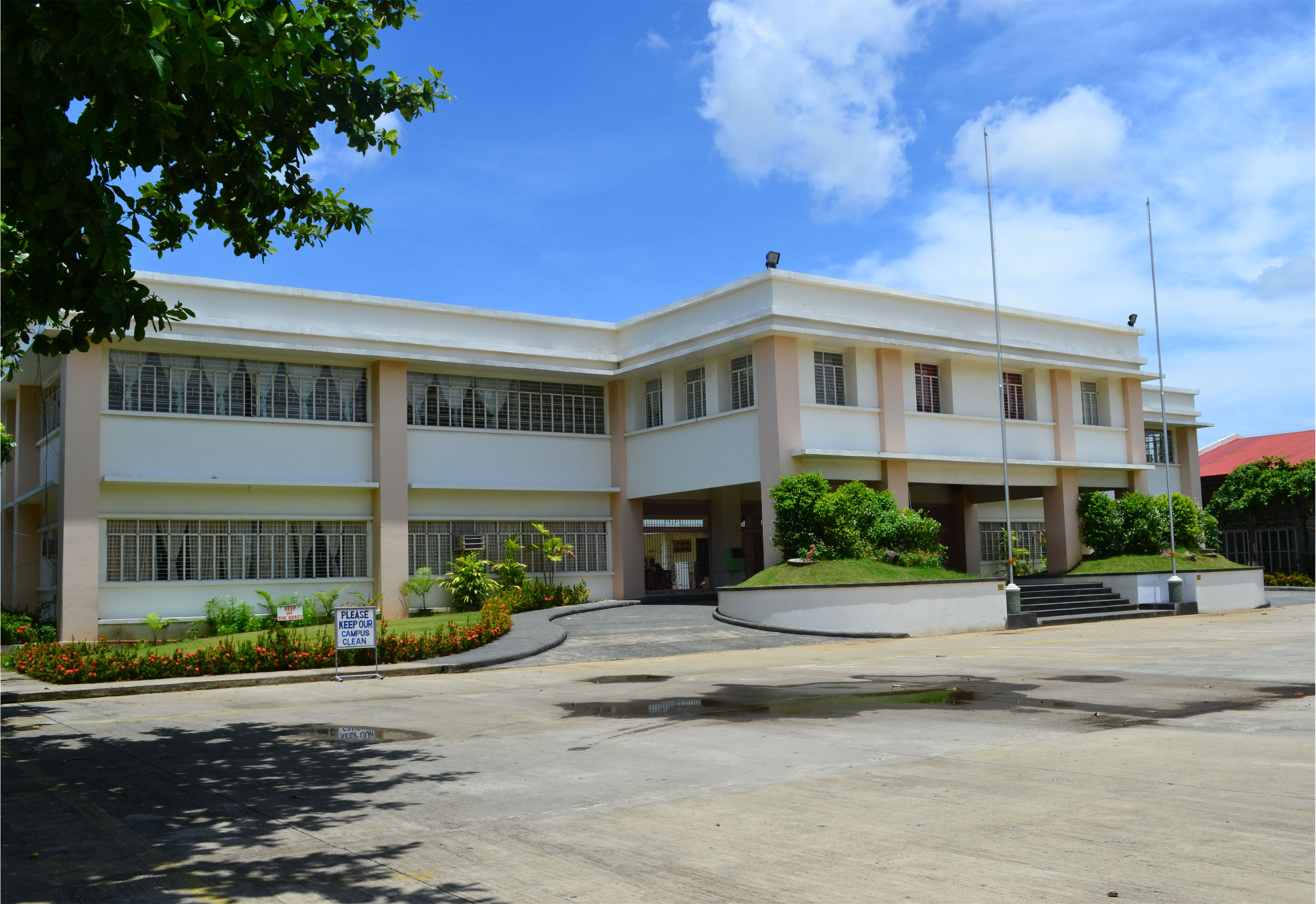
St. Paul College of Ilocos Sur

=== Secondary schools ===
- San Sebastian National High School
- San Vicente Baptist Bible Academy
- San Vicente Integrated School
- St. Paul College of Ilocos Sur (High school)
