= St. Paul University System =

The St. Paul University System is a network of Catholic higher education institutions in the Philippines run by the Sisters of St. Paul of Chartres (SPC). The System was officially awarded accreditation on March 10, 2004. Administered by the (SPC) Congregation of the Sisters of St. Paul of Chartres (E-1904), it consists of seven campuses around the Philippines.

The 7 member campuses of the system is one of the 40 schools owned, managed, and operated by the Sisters of St. Paul of Chartres (SPC) in the Philippines.

St. Paul University Philippines in Tuguegarao is the flagship and main campus of the university system and it is also currently ranked, included, and recognized in the top and major world university rankings such as Quacquarelli Symonds (QS), Times Higher Education (THE), and World University Ranking for Innovation (WURI) rankings.

The St. Paul University System is the first university system recognized by the Commission on Higher Education.

== Campuses ==
- St. Paul University Philippines in Tuguegarao - the flagship constituent university and main campus of the university system.
- St. Paul University Manila
- St. Paul University Quezon City
- St. Paul University Dumaguete
- St. Paul University Iloilo
- St. Paul University Surigao
- St. Paul College of Ilocos Sur
