= San Vicente Church =

Roman Catholic church in Ilocos Sur, Philippines

- Archdiocesan Shrine of Saint Vincent Ferrer
- Saint Vincent Ferrer Parish Church
- Santuario Arquidiocesano de San Vicente Ferrer (Spanish)
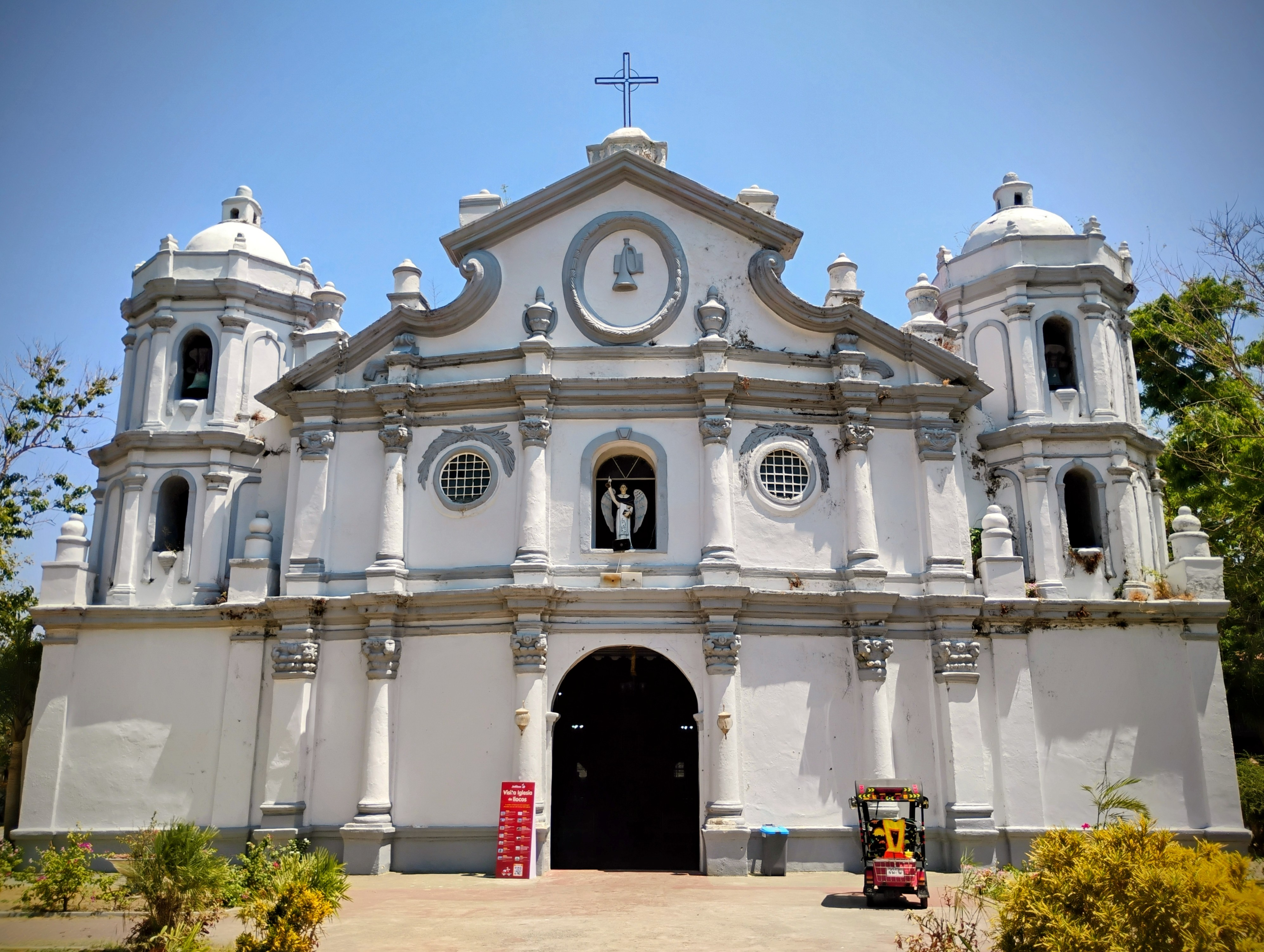
- Church facade in 2026

- Location in Luzon Location in the Philippines
- 17°35′41″N 120°22′27″E
- Location: San Vicente, Ilocos Sur
- Country: Philippines
- Denomination: Roman Catholic

History
- Status: Church
- Founded: April 28, 1795
- Dedication: Saint Vincent Ferrer

Architecture
- Functional status: Active
- Architectural type: Church building
- Style: Baroque
- Groundbreaking: 1795

Administration
- Archdiocese: Nueva Segovia
- Deanery: St. Paul the Apostle

Clergy
- Archbishop: Marlo Mendoza Peralta
- Priest: Fr. Felicismo Ferrer

The Archdiocesan Shrine of Saint Vincent Ferrer, also known as Saint Vincent Ferrer Parish Church, is a Roman Catholic church in the municipality of San Vicente, Ilocos Sur, Philippines. It is under the jurisdiction of the Archdiocese of Nueva Segovia. The church enshrines a miraculous image of Saint Vincent Ferrer in the main retablo. The present church is built in 1795 after the town was founded.

== History ==
In 1795 came the installation of the seat of municipality and the church, and Bo. Tuanong became San Vicente de Ferrer. Don Pedro de Leon was the first parish priest and he was believed as the initiator of the construction of the church of San Vicente. Years then, the image of the titular, was found in fishing nets. Devotees report miracles coming from the saint, causing more local devotees to flock at his shrine to ask for favors from him.

== Architecture and style ==
The church is baroque in style, with two towers and two layers of columns in the facade. The bell towers with three storeys are octagonal, having a resemblance to the bell tower of Vigan. It has four bells hung in each tower. Inside, a pulpit can be found and there are three retablos; one is dedicated to the Virgin Mary, one to the Sacred Heart of Jesus, and the image of Vincent Ferrer is enshrined at the central, main retablo.

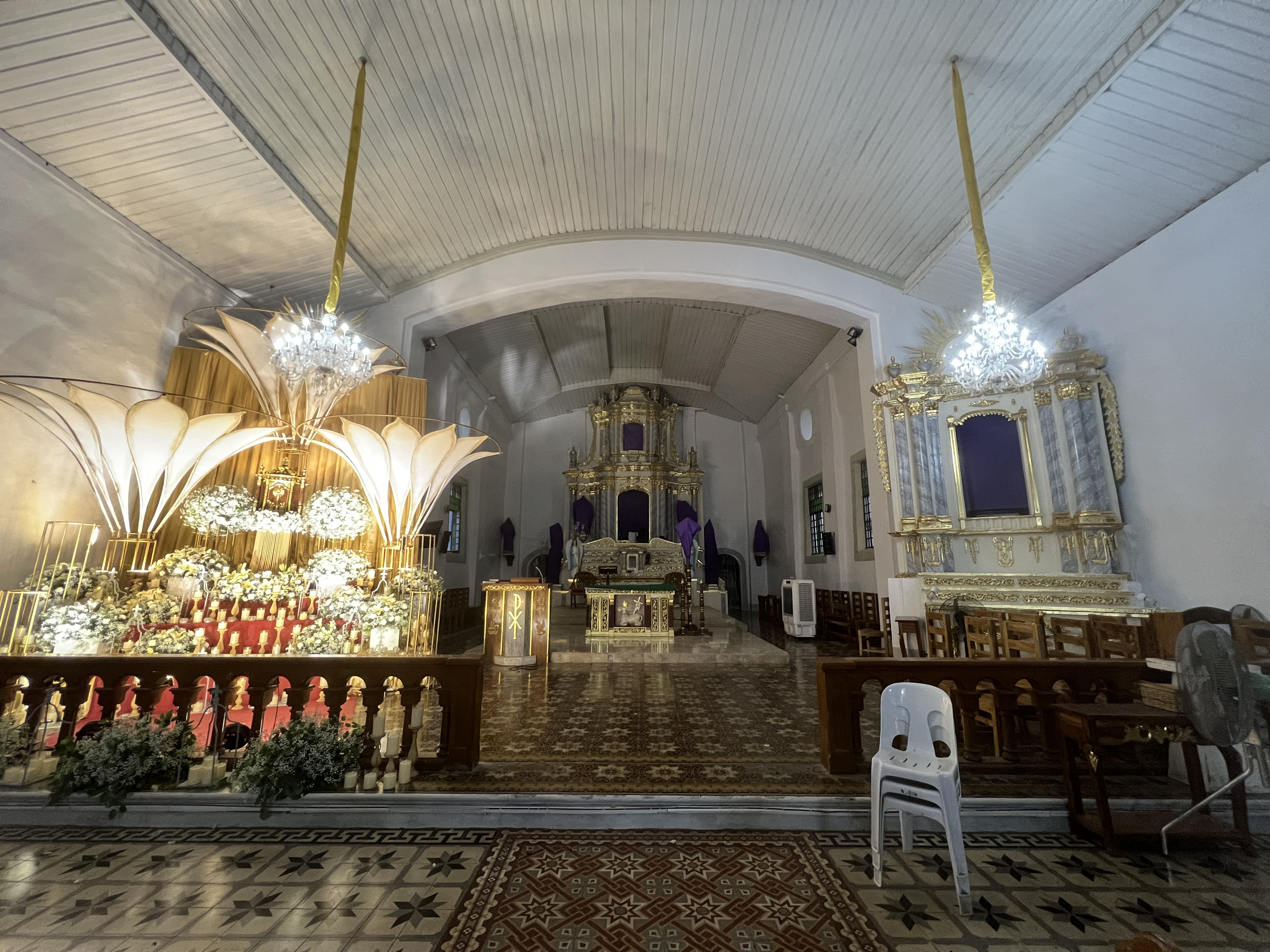
Church sanctuary with altar of repose during the 2026 Paschal Triduum

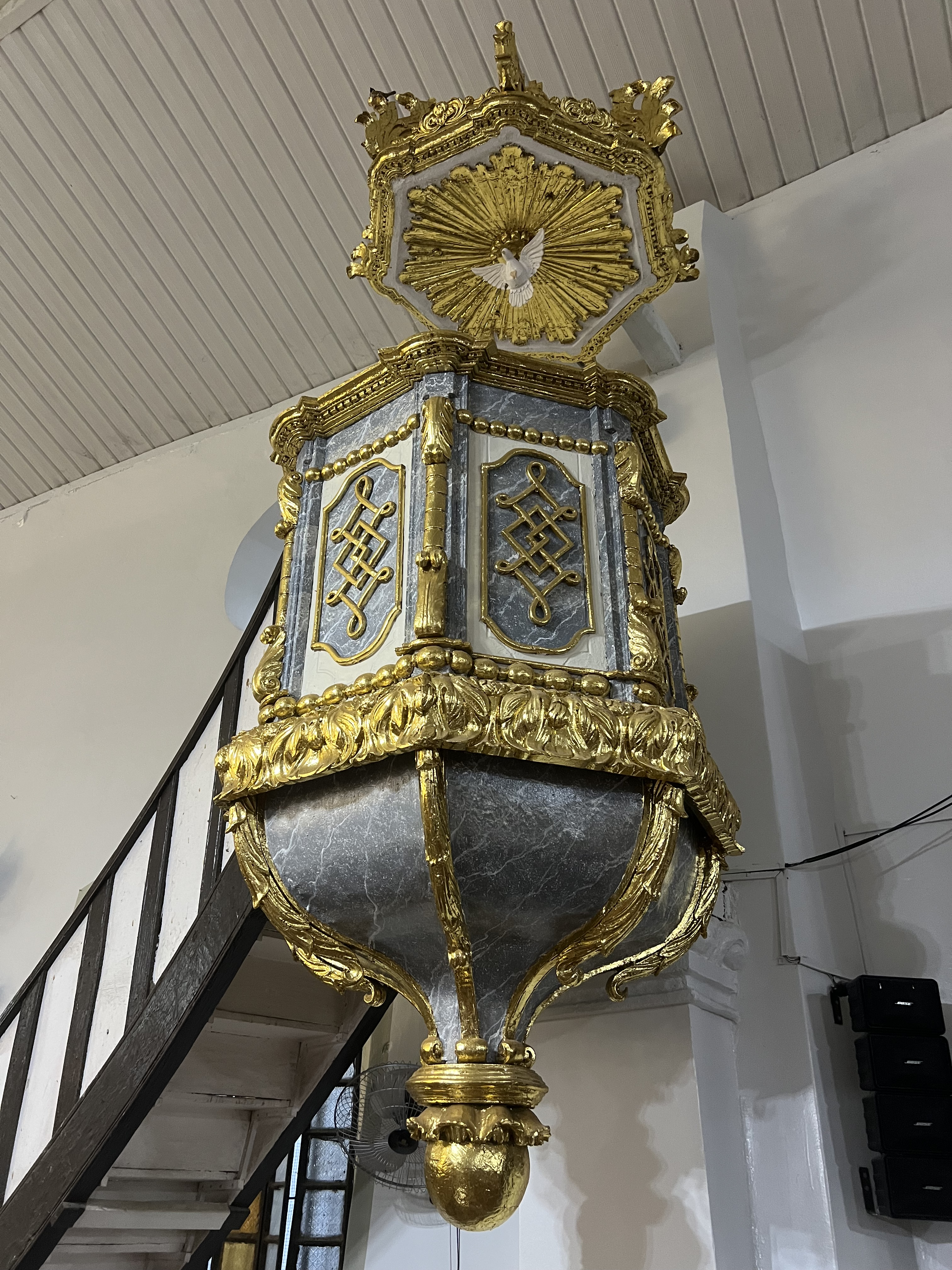
Pulpit

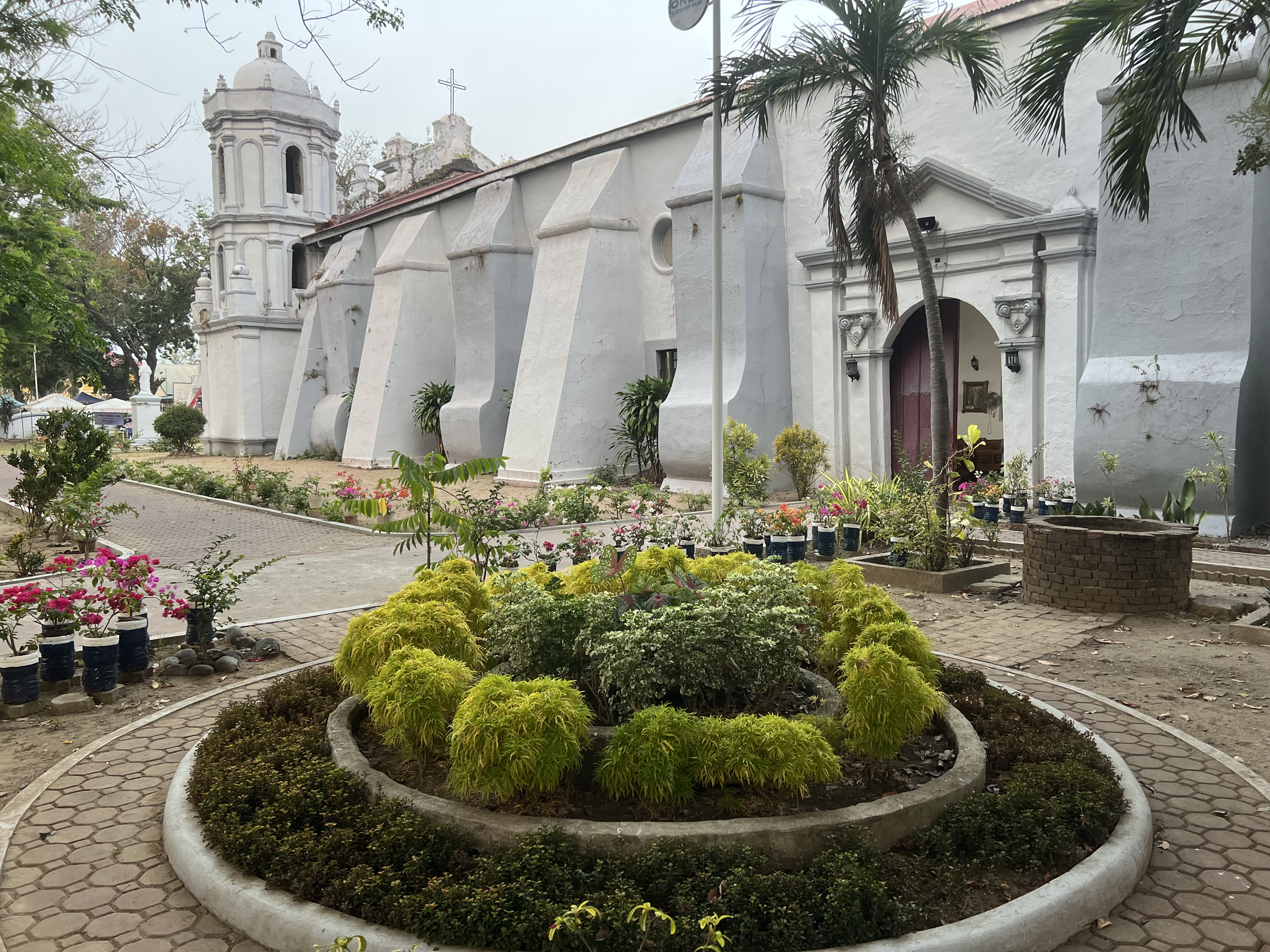
Side walls

Parish office

Lourdes grotto
