= Saint Paul University Surigao =

Roman Catholic university in Surigao del Norte, Philippines

St. Paul University Surigao
- Latin: Sanctus Paulus Universitas Surigensi
- Former names: Doctrina School; Escuela Catolica de San Nicolás (1906); San Nicolas School (1906–1949); San Nicolas College (1949–2004)
- Motto: Caritas Veritas et Scientia (Latin)
- Motto in English: Love, Truth and Knowledge
- Type: Private Roman Catholic non-profit coeducational Basic and Higher education institution
- Established: 1906; 120 years ago
- Religious affiliation: Roman Catholic (Sisters of Charity of Saint Paul of Chartres)
- Academic affiliations: PAASCU
- President: Sr. Rosanne Mallillin, SPC
- Vice-president: Sr.M.LuisaMarcelino,SPC (VP for Finance Services); Sr. Jocelyn Casio, SPC (VP for Christian Formation)
- Principal: Sr. Bernadette Dumo, SPC (Basic Education)
- Students: 12,000 plus
- Location: Cor. Rizal & San Nicolas Sts. Surigao City, Surigao del Norte, 8400, Philippines; 9°47′22″N 125°29′39″E
- Campus: Urban; Main Campus: Corner San NIcolas and Rizal Streets Surigao City (College & Graduate School); Satellite Campus: Km.4 National Highway, Brgy Luna Surigao City (Basic Education Schools)
- Alma Mater song: "The Paulinian Hymn"
- Colors: Green and Gold
- Nickname: Paulinians
- Website: www.spusedu.com
- Location in Mindanao Location in the Philippines

The Saint Paul University Surigao, also referred to as SPUS or SPU Surigao, is a private, Catholic basic and higher education institution run by the Sisters of St. Paul of Chartres (SPC) in Surigao City, Surigao del Norte, Philippines.

It has two campuses: the main campus in the heart of Surigao City houses the college academic units, graduate school and offices and the satellite campus at Brgy. Luna which houses the high school and grade school.

SPUS is the first university in the Caraga region and is identified as the center for development in teacher education and the regional center for Gender and Development, it being the seat of CARAGA Women's resources center established in 1906.

It is one of the seven campuses comprising the St. Paul University System.

It is one of the 40 schools owned, managed, and operated by the Sisters of St. Paul of Chartres (SPC) in the Philippines.

== History ==
St. Paul University Surigao traces its roots to the year 1906 when the last group of Spanish Benedictine Missionaries, who had worked zealously as founders of the Cartilla or Doctrina School (which soon evolved into Escuela Catolica de San Nicolas), with the Religious of the Virgin Mary as administrators, vacated Surigao. Soon after their departure, the Missionaries of the Sacred Heart, also known as the Dutch Fathers, succeeded them, created the parish of Surigao, and made Escuela Catolica de San Nicolas a parochial school which they renamed San Nicolas School.

MILESTONES
1915
The Bureau of Commerce issued Articles and Certificates of Incorporation to legitimize the school's existence. Rev. Adriano Muskins, MSC, parish priest and school head, expanded the primary school for the poor children of the parish who aimlessly roamed the streets. The school continued to grow, taking much time and attention from the parochial duties for the Dutch Fathers, who sought the assistance of others.

1926
Three Sisters from the Congregation of the Sisters of St. Paul of Chartres arrived in Surigao in response to the invitation of Fr. Muskins to administer San Nicolas School. The pioneers were Sister Louise Marguerite Prevoust, Superior; Sr. Consolacion Cruz, Principal; and Sr. Valentine, who would take charge of the boarders. They were welcomed by the parish priest at the time, Rev. Juan Vrakking, MSC, who was to become the first bishop of Surigao in 1940.

1936
The Little Flower Dormitory", a three-story reinforced concrete building completed in 1936, became the nucleus of the growing institution. It housed both the dormitory and the school. Sr. Adela Catalina Llorente, then, Superior, helped speed up the construction with donations solicited from her American friends.

1938
In June, the High School Department opened with Sr. Stella de Jesus Villanueva, SPC, as principal. Rev. Luis Boeren, MSC, took over as Director. The high school courses offered were Secondary Academic and Secondary Normal, to provide the mission with thoroughly trained Christian teachers. Initially, more than twenty female students enrolled. Two years later, male students were accepted. Rec. Jose Croonen, MSC, was parish priest at the time.

1941
The Pacific War that broke out wrought destruction in Surigao. The Surigao Cathedral, the rectory, the school, and the dormitory were destroyed in the heavy bombing. All classes had to be suspended. There was much fear and panic among the people, but the Sisters of St. Paul remained as bulwarks of inner courage and strength. Forced to flee to the mountains, they continued their catechetic work, hiking from one barrio to another and providing a source of comfort and an example of courage. The Sisters were also of great help to the guerrilla forces, filling their medical needs and transmitting important messages, though death was a constant threat.

1945
The liberation of the Philippines was a source of great rejoicing. When the school resumed operation in 1945, classes had to be held in Quonset huts and rehabilitated portions of the Little Flower Dormitory. Rev. Gerardo Tangelder, MSC, was Director of the school.

1948
The Junior Normal School opened and a year later, it was followed by courses in Commerce, Education, and Liberal Arts. This was facilitated by Rev. Carlos Van Den Ouwelant, MSC; Sr. Mary Nathaniel Rocero, SPC; Sr. Marie du Rosaiere Vogel, SPC; Sr. Virginie de Marie de Manuel, SPC; and Sr. Maria Fidela Nerida, SPC. It was also on this year that the first college building was constructed to accommodate the collegiate classes.

1949
San Nicolas School changed its name to San Nicolas College.

1951
The school became the venue of dramatic talents when Rev. Anthony Jansen, MSC, succeeded Fr. Tangelder. Rev. Carlos Van Den Ouwelant, MSC, then school chaplain, who later became the second Bishop of Surigao, and Rev. Nicasio Jansen, MSC, directed the school in the absence of Fr. Anthony. Sr. Adela was succeeded as Superior by Sr. Teresita of St. Paul Soledad.

SNC offered Secondary Home Economics (BSHE) and Junior Normal Home Economics (ETC-HE).

1953
Courses in Secondary Trade and Bachelor of Science in Elementary Education (BSEEd) were offered and recognition was given to the BSE, BSHE and Liberal Arts Programs.

1960
The BSEEd Program received recognition, the same year, which saw the start of a new two-storey building for the Grade School.

1961
When Rev. Herman Van Der Sman, MSC, became Director, more buildings were erected to accommodate the increasing student population, and a stronger faculty built up with the aid of scholarships and grants. The science laboratories were equipped with sophisticated apparatuses and equipment. The Instructional Media Center and the gymnasium were furnished with additional instruction aids.

Meanwhile, Mrs. Natividad Abella-Felicio organized the SNC Dance Troupe with the assistance of Mr. Concordio Leva. Sr. Jude of the Holy Spirit Paat, SPC, formed the SNC Troubadours.

1966
Two significant events marked this year: the blessing of the new four-storey concrete Administration Building and the celebration of the Golden Jubilee of San Nicolas College's founding.

1968
The Government of Netherlands donated a large amount of money, a gift to the people of Surigao, to be used for the construction of the Science Building, the High School Building, and the Gymnasium.

1972
Sr. Emilie de Marie Manzano, SPC, became the High School Principal. Martial Law banned the SNC Student Council and school paper.

1973
Sr. Aniceta du Sacre-Couer Ochoa, SPC, took over as Principal. On March 13, 1973. Installation of Msgr. Miguel C. Cinches as the third bishop of Surigao. He was also the Chairman of the Board of Trustees of San Nicolas College.

1975
SNC was made the Regional Staff Development Center (RSDC) for Region X. That same year, in compliance with the Filipinization Law Sr. Pura du Sacre-Coeur Belmonte, SPC, became the first Filipino President of SNC, assuming the office vacated by Rev. Herman Van Der Sman, MSC.

1976
After its first survey of the Colleges of Liberal Arts, Education, and Commerce, the Philippine Accrediting Association of Schools, Colleges, Universities (PAASCU) accepted San Nicolas College as an accredited member.

1977
Mrs. Dulcemina O. Leva became the first lay High School Principal.

1978
Master of Arts in Teaching (MAT) with specialization in Educational Management, English, and Home Economics was offered and received government recognition four years after.

1980
Doctoral and MBA Programs were offered in consortium with Xavier University in Cagayan de Oro City.

1981
Sr. Maria Josefa Grey, SPC, was installed as second SNC President. She improved the school's physical plant and systematized services.

1983
Bachelor of Elementary Education (BEEd) program was offered.

1984
The Computer Laboratory was installed. Typhoon Nitang brought exceedingly heavy damage to the school, but Sr. Josefa's effort program soon brought rehabilitation.

Doctoral and MBA Programs were granted recognition. The new Elementary School Building was built.

Bachelor of Secondary Education (BSEd) program was opened and Mr. Rodolfo G. Gier became the second lay High School Principal.

PAASCU granted a five-year reaccreditation to Liberal Arts, Education and Commerce Programs.

1985
Organization of San Nicolas College Alumni Association.

1987
Sr. Maria Felicina Gubuan, SPC came in as President. She soon became known for the school's Outreach Program. Equipped with new instruments, a new building housing administration and staff offices was completed.

1988
The Securities and Exchange Commission approved the revised SNC By-Laws.

1989
A course leading to the degree of Bachelor of Science in Commerce, major in Computer Science was offered. Additional units were installed in the computer Laboratory and the Typing Laboratory was refurbished. A two-storey building accommodating several offices and a conference room was completed.

1990
SNC Diamond Jubilee year-long celebration started in February. In May, DECS granted a permit to operate an MBA program. Sr. Felicina was re-appointed by the Board of Trustees for a second term of three years.

1991 DECS granted the permit to offer courses leading to the degree of Bachelor of Science in Accountancy (BSA).

Computer classes were offered to the high school students. The Community Extension Service/School Outreach Program was strengthened and institutionalized.

PAASCU granted SNC Level II status.

1992
The SNC Credit Cooperative was converted to a multipurpose cooperative approved by the SPU Surigao FECOCU General Assembly.

The High School Department was adjudged one of the five “Excellent Private Secondary Schools” in Region X.

1993
DECS allowed the opening of courses leading to the degree of Bachelor of Science in Computer Science and Computer Secretarial. Empowerment through English Enrichment (SETEE) classes was organized.

1994
Bachelor of Science in Accountancy Program was recognized by the government. Bachelor of Science in Commerce, major in Management Accounting was approved. The blessing of the Computer Laboratory II in July coincided with the installation of the Local Area Network (LAN), the first in the province of Surigao del Norte.

1995
Computer Secretarial (CS) Program was issued government recognition in May. In June Sr. Marie Renee Javato, SPC was installed as the fourth President of San Nicolas College. PAASCU granted the High School Department Level I Accreditation, and SNC celebrated its eightieth anniversary (1915-1995) as an institution granted legal personality by the government.

1996
PAASCU granted SNC's Liberal Arts, Commerce, and Educational Programs another five-year re-accreditation until 2001. SNC was chosen one of the 22 Centers of Development in Teacher Education throughout the country and a member school of the Higher Education Institutions (HEI) CARAGA Networking. The High School Computer Laboratory was set up.

SNC received the Rotary Outstanding Surigaonon Award (ROSA) for Education from the Rotary Club of Metro Surigao, the Philippines-Australia Project in Basic Education (PROBE), and the Commission on Higher Education (CHED) scholarship in Teacher Education. Sr. Marie Renee Javato, SPC, was a recipient of the DECS Salamat Po Award.

1997
The construction of a concrete bridge connecting the Main Building and St. Paul University Surigao Building was started. Computer Technology was granted a permit and Biology was offered as a new major in BSEd.

1998
The internet system, local and international, started operation in SNC. A new Graduate School Program, Master in Public Administration (MPA) was offered in June and Filipino was an additional major in the Master of Arts program.

The CARAGA Women's Resource Center (CWRC), a regional center for Gender and Development, a project of the Philippines-Canada Local Government Support Program (LGSP), San Nicolas College (SNC), Surigao del Norte (SDN), and Surigao City (SC), was housed in San Nicolas College.

The Diocese of Surigao, in the person of Bishop Miguel Cinches, SVD, donated San Nicolas College to the Sisters of St. Paul of Chartres through Sr. Agnes Therese Teves, SPC.

1999
Curriculum Initiatives for Teacher Education (CITE) was offered in SNC, the college being one of the fourteen (14) teacher training institutions nationwide chosen to field the program. The revised retirement policy was implemented. Sister Mary Magdalen Torres, SPC assumed Chairmanship of the SNC Board of Trustees: Dr. Dulcemina O. Leva was appointed as the first lay Vice President for Academic Affairs and Dr. Lucy L. Teves as the Research and Planning Officer.

2000
Sr. Concepcion Dacanay, SPC and Sr. Teresita Bayona, SPC were installed Local Superior and the 6th SNC President, respectively.

Organizational development activities were held: revision of the Faculty Manual by representatives from the three departments; Strategic Planning Workshop and Basic Management Course for SNC Managers; Personal Effectiveness Seminar, Documentation Procedures, and Health Safety and Security Seminar for the whole institution by work groups; formation of the SNC Vision-Mission Team.

Curricular innovations were introduced such as the Integrative Modular Curriculum Delivery System, Multimedia Courseware Development, Writing Thinking Test Items, Developing a Curriculum (DACUM), Grade Master and Introduction of Number Grades.

Training workshops/sessions were conducted for the guidance counselors on basic counseling and test interpretation; the librarians on library operations; the Homeroom advisers on the Homeroom Program; the Paulthenics advisers on module making and facilitating skills; the student leaders on leadership training; the canteen personnel on baking and cooking; the carpenters on carpentry skills; the laboratory technician on laboratory techniques and management; the secretaries on filing system.

Infrastructure development included the following: construction of a five-storey building to house the canteen, instructional media center, guidance center, student affairs and alumni offices, hotel and restaurant laboratories, and computer laboratories; construction of a four-storey building housing the high school computer laboratories and classrooms; renovation of the library, relocation and installation of a new speech laboratory; renovation of offices – the President, the Deans, Christian Formation, Finance, Registrar, General Services, FEMUCO, clinic, ROTC, CAT, and the High School HE; renovation of the comfort rooms; installation of drinking fountains in the three departments; renovation of the gymnasium; improvement of the water and drainage system; renovation of the Little Flower Dormitory; and landscaping of the grounds.

Additional equipments were acquired in the libraries and laboratories – Science, Computer, and Home Economics. Additional instructional facilities were added like the PROBE English laboratory, PROBE Science laboratory, and PROBE Math laboratory. Automation of the College library, finance, and registration was done.

SNC celebrated its 85th anniversary.

2001
The High School topped in the division ranking in the National Secondary Achievement Test (NSAT); Total Quality Management System and Innovative Processes were adopted; PMS, Instructional Modules, DACUM, CAI, Computerized Grading System, among others; a Science section in every level was created. Nursery class was opened in June 2001.

The Electronics Engineering Laboratory was constructed in the 5th floor of the main Building.

A lot in KM 3 for the new HS Building of SPC was acquired.

Research subject was introduced in 2nd year Science section and computerized – aided math for all high school students. In July 2001, Liberal Arts and Commerce programs were granted 5-year Level II re-accreditation by the PAASCU Board of Directors, valid until 2006.

2002
On June 3, Sr. Helen Malubay, SPC, was proclaimed Acting President and Sr. Cecilia Sto. Tomas, SPC as new HS Principal.

Permits were granted by CHED to offer Bachelor of Science in Office Administration (TP R13-340402-01, s. 2002), Bachelor of Science in Public Administration (TP R13-3445401-01, s. 2002) and Bachelor of Science in Accounting Technology (TP R13-343205-01, s. 2002) on May 6, 2002.

Bachelor of Science in Commerce (BSC) was changed to Bachelor of Science in Business Administration (BSBA) effective June 2002.

On June 20, the Board of Trustees amended its by-laws, approved the new nomenclature, St. Paul University System, San Nicolas Campus which was registered and approved by the Securities and Exchange Commission on August 29, 2002. The new seal and motto, Caritas et Scientia was approved by the Board of Trustees.

March 31, 2002
Marked the Ground Breaking Ceremony for the new SPUS-SNC Building at Kilometer 3. Construction of the new HS building started during the year.

BS Nursing, Pharmacy, Medical Technology, Radiologic Technology, Office Administration and Criminology were opened as new undergraduate programs in June 2002.

In support of its new BS Criminology program, the school purchased equipment such as Forensic Optical, Polygraph or Lie-Detector Machine, Questioned Documents and Fingerprints Kits. Extension classes of St. Paul University Philippines in Doctor of Business Management and Master of Science in Information Technology were offered in SPUS-SNC Graduate School.

Computer-Aided English Diagnostic Test to improve reading and comprehensive ability was administered to all high school students. The result was used to enhance the HS curriculum.

In support of its Quality Management System, the 5S (sort, systematize, sweep, sanitize, self-discipline) was implemented.

March 31, 2002
Marked the Ground Breaking Ceremony for the new SPUS-SNC High School Building. Construction of the building started.

2003
Sister Teresita Bayona, SPC was reinstalled as President of SPUS-SNC.

On January 13, 2003 The articles and by laws of SPUS - SNC Students’ Multipurpose Cooperative were presented for registration to and approved by the Cooperative Development Authority.

On February 8, 2003 The blessing of the New High School building at Km. 3 was officiated by his Excellency, the Most Reverend Antonieto Cabajog and assisted by the Surigao Diocesan Clergy.

In June 2003 The high school students transferred to the new building in Km. 3 Campus.

In August 2003 The new SPUS-SNC IT/Entrepreneurship College laboratory was completed and blessed.

In October 2003 A team from CHED FAPE visited the Graduate School for the Evaluation of Graduate Education Programs (EGEP).

December 3 CHED evaluators were in SPU Surigao to validate reports pertinent to the school's qualification for membership to the St. Paul University System.

2004 On February 9, 2004, Certificate for University System was granted by CHED to the six Higher Education Institutions (HEIs) namely: St. Paul University Tuguegarao, St. Paul College Manila, St. Paul College Quezon City, St. Paul College Dumaguete, St. Paul College Iloilo and St. Paul University System San Nicolas campus. The St. Paul University System was regarded as the first University System to be recognized by CHED in the country.

March 10, 2004 SPUS-SNC changed its name to St. Paul University Surigao.

Bachelor of Science in Information Technology (BSIT) was granted government recognition R13-464108-01, s. 2004 by CHED. This was issued on June 24, 2004.

BS in Civil Engineering and BS in Electronics and Communications Engineering were offered.

October 4–5, 2004 - PAASCU Accreditors visited SPU Surigao for the preliminary survey of the High School Department.

2005
PAASCU granted level I accredited status to the High School Department.

March 3–4, 2005 - PAASCU accreditors visited SPU Surigao for the preliminary survey of the Teacher Education and Computer Science Programs.

March 28–29, 2005 – SPU Surigao underwent Strategic Planning for academic year 2005-2010.

CHED granted the school Government Recognition to operate the programs. Bachelor of Science in Criminology by virtue of R13-891301-02, s. 2005 issued on April 16, 2005 and Bachelor of Science in Accounting Technology (BSAT) per GR No. R13-343205-01, s. 2005 issued on April 18, 2005.

Government Recognitions were likewise issued by CHED to Bachelor of Science in Public Administration (BSPA), GR No. R13-345201-01, s. 2005, and Bachelor of Science in Office Administration (BSOA), GR No. R13-340402-01, s. 2005 programs on April 18, 2005.

June 14, 2005 - Bachelor of Science in Hotel and Restaurant Management was recognized by the government.

September 2, 2005 – SPU Surigao was awarded the DIN EN ISO 9001-2000 Certificate of TUV Rheinland Philippines Ltd., member of TUV Group by Ma. Gloria Gita Sehwani Benitez, Operations Manager.

2006
Sister Merceditas Ang, SPC was installed as the 8th President of St. Paul University Surigao on June 19.

Caregiver was offered as a short-term course by the University. A Certificate of TVET Program Registration, WTR No. 0615032006, was issued by TESDA on May 26, 2006 to allow the school to offer a Seven-Month Professional Caregiver NC II program.

Bachelor of Science in Information Management (BSIM) was granted government recognition R13-464107-02, s. 2006 by CHED, issued on July 6, 2006.

August 17–18, 2006 - Resurvey of Liberal Arts and Commerce programs by PAASCU

September 6–8, 2006 - San Nicolas College, now St. Paul University Surigao celebrated its centenary with the theme “SNC-SPU@100:Legacies and Challenges”

September 7, 2006 - The Sacred Heart Statue in front of the University's Science Building was blessed and unveiled in honor of the Missionaries of the Sacred Heart (MSC) Fathers.

October 5–6, 2006 - First formal survey of HS program by PAASCU.

CHED granted government recognition R13-542202-01 s. 2006, issued on October 25, 2006 to the Bachelor of Science in Computer Engineering (BSCpE) program.

November 23–24, 2006 - ISO Surveillance Audit

December 11–15, 2006 – A team composed of four (4) evaluators came to SPU Surigao to look into the capabilities of the school in relation to the CHED's Institutional Monitoring & Evaluation for Quality Assurance in Higher Education (IQUAME).

2007
Certificate of Accreditation was awarded to St. Paul University Surigao as TESDA's Accredited Assessment Center for Computer Hardware Servicing NC II (Accreditation No. R33-07-03-021), PC Operation NC II (Accreditation No. R33-07-03-022), and Food and Beverages Services NC II (Accreditation No. R33-07-03-023) on May 10, 2007.

CHED issued Government Recognition R13-541601-07 s. 2007 on May 15, 2008 to the Bachelor of Science in Civil Engineering (BSCE) program.

New majors for the Bachelor of Science in Business Administration (BSBA) program were offered effective June 2007. These are Financial Management, Operations Management, Marketing Management, Business Economics, and Human Resource Development Management.

Certificates of TVET Program Registration were issued by TESDA on June 20, 2007 to offer specialized programs in the University-WTR No. 715032176 for PC Operations NC II (214 hours), WTR No. 715032177 for Hardware Servicing NC II(356 hours), WTR No. 715032178 for Computer Programming NC IV (252 hours), WTR No. 715032179 for Housekeeping NC II(436 hours), WTR No. 715032180 for Bartending NC II (286 hours), and WTR No.715032181 for Food & Beverage Services NC II (336 hours).

TESDA issued Certificates of TVET Program Registration to offer Caregiving NC II (786 hours), WTR No. 0715032203 and Healthcare Services NC II (996 hours), WTR No. 0715032203 on July 25, 2007.

The Liberal Arts and Commerce programs were granted a four- year re accredited status by PAASCU on November 28, 2007.

2008
Government Recognitions were issued by CHED to Bachelor of Science in Electronics and Communications Engineering (BSECE), GR No. R13-542207-01, s. 2001 and Bachelor of Science in Tourism Management (BSTM), GR No. R13-787201-07, s. 2008 programs on February 6, 2008. Certificate of Recognition was awarded to St. Paul University Surigao as Center of Training Institution for the Department of Education (DepEd) Certificate and INSET programs on March 7, 2008, having passed the criteria set by the Commission on Higher Education (CHED), DepEd, and Teacher Education Council.

Government Recognition was issued by CHED to Bachelor of Science in Psychology per GR No. R13-305201-01, series of 2008 dated June 12, 2008.

Permit to Operate Review Center No. 050, Series of 2008 was granted to St. Paul University Surigao by the Commission on Higher Education (CHED) to operate a Review Center for Nursing Program in consortium with Review for Global Review Center, Davao City through CHED EnBanc Resolution No. 320-2008, dated June 23, 2008.

CHED, likewise granted a Permit to Operate Review Center No. 051, Series of 2008 to St. Paul University Surigao to operate a Review Center for Nursing Program in consortium with Review for Global Opportunities, Iloilo City per CHED En Banc Resolution No. 320-2008, dated June 23, 2008.

St. Paul University Surigao was granted a Permit to Operate Review Center No. 054, Series of 2008 by the Commission on Higher Education (CHED) to operate a Review Center for Teacher Education Program by virtue of CHED En Banc Resolution No. 353-2008, dated July 14, 2008.

2009
Temporary permit to operate Bachelor of Science in Mining Engineering was granted by CHED per TP No. R13-543601-01, series of 2009 dated May 6, 2009.

Temporary Permit to operate Bachelor of Science in Mathematics (BS Math), Level 1 was granted by CHED per TP No. R13-460100-01, series of 2009 dated May 6, 2009

ISO recertification was granted by TUV Rheinland Philippines, Ltd after its certification audit on September 2–3, 2009.

The Grade School Department underwent Consultancy Visit by a PAASCU Consultant on November 27, 2009

2010
PAASCU Team of Accreditors conducted preliminary survey of Criminology, Information Technology, and Hotel & Restaurant Programs on January 18–19, 2010.

Ground Breaking Ceremony and Laying of Cornerstone of the Grade School Building were done on April 24, 2010 at the New Site. Contractor: ARSD Construction Corp.

Temporary permit to operate Bachelor of Library and Information Science (BLIS) Level I was granted by CHED per TP No. R13-842201-01, series of 2010 dated May 25, 2010

Temporary permit to operate Bachelor of Elementary Education (BEED) with Pre-School as area of concentration was granted by CHED per TP No. R13-141203-01, series of 2010 dated May 25, 2010

Approval to offer Values edition as additional major in the Bachelor of Secondary Education (BSED) program effective Academic Year 2010-2011, was given by CHED per 1st endorsement dated May 25, 2010 Sr. Marie Rosanne Mallillin, SPC, the 9th president of St. Paul University Surigao, was installed to office on June 11, 2010

Recertification of SPU Surigao as an ISO firm was issued by TUV Rheinland Philippines, Ltd. after the August 26–27, 2010 Surveillance Audit

CHED Caraga declared SPU Surigao to have complied with CHED standards beyond the minimum requirements after its CHED monitoring and evaluation on September 15, 2010.

PAASCU preliminary visit of the Elementary Department was done on September 30 - October 1, 2010.

2011
The Blessing of the new Elementary Building, Km. 3 campus, took place on June 3, 2011.

Grade school classes started operating in the new campus on June 6, 2011 and pre-school classes on June 13, 2011.

July 25–26, 2011 -ISO Surveillance Audit. Result: SPU Surigao was reconfirmed as an ISO certified firm up to November 16, 2015.

August 5, 2011 - Blessing of the New Canteen in the New Site.

2012
On Jan 24-25, PAASCU Resurvey of Liberal Arts and Business Programs and Formal Survey of Elementary and Secondary Education Programs Result: LA and Business programs granted re-accreditation for five (5) years, valid up to January 2017. Elementary and Secondary Education programs granted initial accreditation for three (3) years, valid up to January 2015.

February 4, 2012 - Blessing of the Learning Resource Center (LRC) in the New Site.

May 7 - June 1, 2012-SPU Surigao was the training center of K to 12 for Grade 7 in the whole CARAGA Region.

August 20, 2012 - Blessing of the Swimming Pool in the New Site.

August 23–24, 2012 - Recertification Audit by TUV Rheinland, Inc. Result: SPU Surigao is recertified as having met the requirements of ISO 9001:2008 Standard. Validity of Recertification is from December 28, 2012 until November 16, 2015.

2013
On January 21, SPU Surigao was granted temporary permit to offer MA in Curriculum Design and Development and MA in Cultural Education effective AY 2013 – 2014.

February 28-March 1, 2013 - PAASCU Formal Survey of Criminology Program and Preliminary Survey of Engineering Program Result: Criminology program granted initial accreditation for three years valid up to May 2016.

April 23, 2013 - Blessings of the new SPUS Gym in the New Site at Km. 4

July 22, 2013- PAASCU Revisit of High School Department. Result: High School was granted Level II Re-accreditation for four years valid until May 2017.

July 25, 2013 - Bachelor of Early Childhood Education was granted Government Recognition R13-141202-02, s. 2013 and granted temporary permit to offer Bachelor of Science in Mining Engineering 4th year level; Bachelor of Library and Information Science 3rd year level; Bachelor of Physical Education major in PE 2nd year level by CHED.

August 27, 2013 - ISO Surveillance Audit. Result: SPU Surigao was reconfirmed as an ISO certified firm up to November 16, 2015.

November 2013 - SPU Surigao was identified as Learning Resource Institute (LRI) for DILG in the implementation of the 2013 Citizen Satisfaction Index Survey (CSIS) for Surigao City.

Three significant events marked this year: the blessing of the two big guest's houses (one in the new site and another in the main site) which could accommodate from 12 to 15 guests altogether in 5 big rooms plus another single room guest house (new site), the newly constructed 4-level staircase to the Science Building in the main site, and a newly acquired Isuzu Van to augment two old school buses.

2014
The High School Department was awarded by the Scholastic as the Highest Growth in Lexile.

SPU Surigao was authorized by CHED to operate the 2nd year and 3rd year levels of the Bachelor of Physical Education Major in School P.E. program effective AY 2014-2015 dated on February 14, 2014.

February 24, 2014 -SPU Surigao was granted government recognition to operate the Bachelor of Science in Mining Engineering from 1st year to 5th year levels and Bachelor of Library and Information Science programs.

March 5, 2014 - Awarded as Accredited Competency Assessment Center by TESDA for Housekeeping NC II, Computer Hardware Servicing NC II and Food and Beverage Services NC II.

March 19, 2014 - SPU Surigao held its Diamond High School Graduation (75th).

June 20, 2014 - Granted government permits to operate the Senior High School Program – Academic Track: General Academic and Accountancy & Business Management; TechVoc Track: Industrial Arts

August 2, 2014 – Blessing of the CARAGA Culinary Center and C3 Café that were located at the ground floor, LFD building, Main Campus.

September 2, 2014 - ISO Surveillance Audit. Result: SPU Surigao was reconfirmed as an ISO certified firm up to November 16, 2015.

December 4, 2014 – Groundbreaking Ceremony of St. Paul Surigao University Hospital Incorporated (SPSUHI) at Km. 3, Barangay Luna, Surigao City.

== University Seal ==
The University Seal is the insignia of the St. Paul University Surigao. The Seal was adapted from the coat of arms of the Sisters of St. Paul of Chartres (SPC) the founder and the owner of St. Paul University Surigao and other Paulinian institutions.

== Programs and Courses ==
=== Graduate school ===
- Doctor of Philosophy (PhD)
  - Major: Educational Management
- Doctor of Business Management (DBM)
- Master of Arts (MA)
  - Major: English
  - Filipino
  - Science
  - Math
  - Home Economics
  - Educational Management
- Master of Science in Information Technology (MSIT)
- Master of Business Administration (MBA)
- Master of Public Administration (MPA)

=== College of Business & Technology ===
- Bachelor of Science in Accountancy
- Bachelor of Science in Business Administration
  - Human Resource Development Management
  - Financial Management
  - Marketing Management
- Bachelor of Science in Computer Science
- Bachelor of Science in Information Technology
- Bachelor of Science in Office Administration
- Bachelor of Science in Public Administration
- Bachelor of Science in Accounting Technology
- Bachelor of Science in Hotel Restaurant Management
- Bachelor of Science in Tourism Management
- 2 year Computer Secretarial
- 2 year Hotel & Restaurant Management
- 2 year Computer Hardware Servicing

=== College of Arts and Sciences ===
- Bachelor of Arts (AB)
  - Philosophy
  - Sociology
  - English Language
  - Mass Communication
  - Political Science
- Bachelor of Science in Mathematics
- Bachelor of Library and Information Science

=== College of Engineering ===
- Bachelor of Science in Civil Engineering
- Bachelor of Science in Computer Engineering
- Bachelor of Science in Mining Engineering

=== College of Health Sciences ===
- Bachelor of Science in Nursing
- Bachelor of Science in Psychology

=== College of Teacher Education ===
- Bachelor in Elementary Education
- Bachelor in Secondary Education
  - Major: English
  - Filipino
  - Science
  - Mathematics
  - Biological Home Economics
  - Business Technology
  - Physical Science
  - Social Studies
  - P.E., Health and Music
  - Library and Info Science

=== College of Criminology ===
- Bachelor of Science in Criminology

=== Basic Education ===
Secondary education, Elementary education, Pre-School

=== Other ===
Soon to be offered

- Bachelor in Agricultural Technology
- Diploma in Agricultural Technology
- Mining Courses

== See also ==
- St. Paul University Philippines, Tuguegarao City
- St. Paul University Manila, Metro Manila
- St. Paul University Quezon City, Metro Manila
- St. Paul University at San Miguel, Bulacan
- St. Paul University Dumaguete, Negros Oriental
- St. Paul University Iloilo, Iloilo City
