= St. Paul University Quezon City =

Roman Catholic university in Quezon City, Philippines

- Former name: St. Paul College Quezon City (1946–2004)
- Motto: Caritas Christi Urget Nos (Latin)
- Motto in English: The charity of Christ urges us
- Type: Private Roman Catholic research non-profit coeducational Basic and Higher education institution
- Established: July 7, 1946; 80 years ago
- Founder: Congregation of the Sisters of Saint Paul of Chartres
- Religious affiliation: Roman Catholic (Sisters of Saint Paul of Chartres)
- Academic affiliations: IFCU; PAASCU; ASEACCU; WCC
- President: Sr. Lilia Thérèse Tolentino, SPC
- Vice-president: Sr. Helen Malubay, SPC (VP for Academics)
- Location: Aurora Boulevard corner Gilmore Avenue, New Manila, Quezon City, Philippines, Quezon City, Metro Manila, Philippines; 14°36′53″N 121°02′08″E
- Colors: Green and Gold
- Nickname: Paulinians
- Website: www.spuqc.edu.ph
- Location in Metro Manila Location in Luzon Location in the Philippines

St. Paul University Quezon City (SPUQC), also referred to as SPU Quezon City, is a private, sectarian and coeducational university located in New Manila, Quezon City, Philippines. It was previously an all-girls' school and became coeducational beginning school year 2006-2007.

In June 2006, SPUQC started to admit men who are pursuing college education. The High School Department followed suit when the first set of graduates from the co-ed Grade School enrolled in the High School in June 2008. Its sister school, St. Paul College Pasig, remains as an exclusive all-girls school.

It is one of the seven campuses in the St. Paul University System, and one of the 40 schools owned, managed, and operated by the Sisters of Saint Paul of Chartres (SPC) in the Philippines. It is a charter member of the Philippine Accrediting Association of Schools, Colleges and Universities (PAASCU).

== History ==
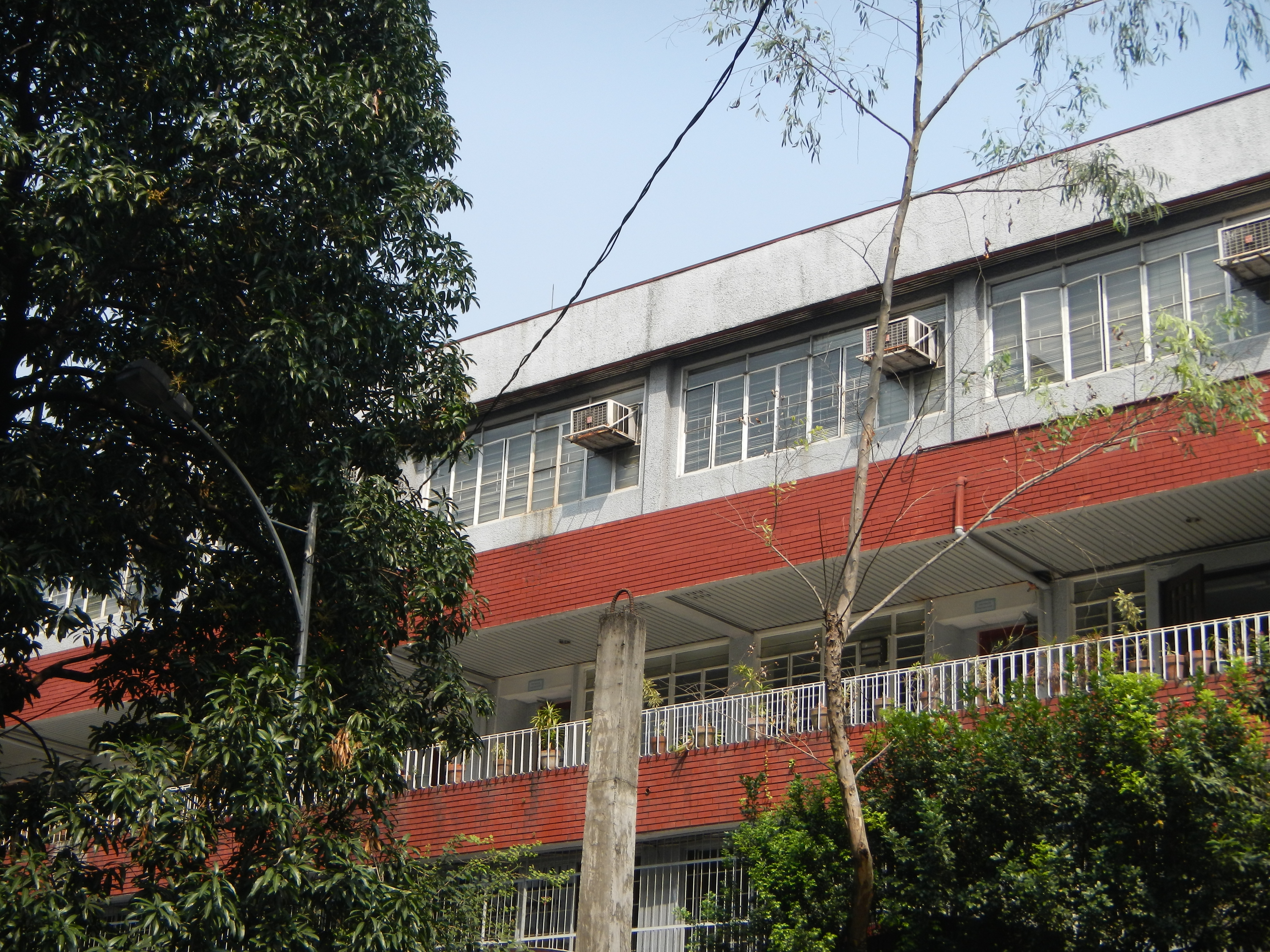
Left facade, Gilmore Avenue

The college was established as St. Paul College Quezon City Branch in 1946. It was founded by the Sisters of St. Paul of Chartres (SPC), a congregation established in Chartres, France, by Father Louis Chauvet in 1696. The college originally catered to young women of the upscale New Manila area.

The Liberal Arts and Commerce programs were first granted accreditation status by PAASCU in 1983 along with the High School Department. The application for the accreditation of the Science programs followed in 1989. All these programs have periodically been granted re-accreditation status since then.

The grade school was initially offered to boys and girls. Eventually, the high school and college levels were exclusively offered to women, making the school a full women's college in 1966.

== Accreditation ==
The college enjoys full autonomy status from the Commission on Higher Education of the Philippines. It was also awarded a Level III Accreditation (the second highest possible level) by the Philippine Accrediting Association of Schools, Colleges, and Universities (PAASCU).

== Academics ==
Basic Education

- Preschool and Grade School
- Junior High School
- Senior High School – Academic Track

- Science, Technology, Engineering, and Mathematics (STEM)
- Accountancy, Business, and Management (ABM)
- Humanities and Social Sciences (HUMSS)

- Senior High School – Arts and Design Track

College of Business and Technology (CBT)

- BS in Business Administration major in Marketing Management (3 years)
- BS in Entrepreneurship with specialization in Social Entrepreneurship (3.5 years)
- BS in Hospitality Management (3 years) with specialization in Culinary Operations (3.5 years)
- BS in Tourism Management (3 years) with specialization in Aviation Management (3.5 years)
- BS in Information Technology (3 years) with specialization in Game Development or Cyber Security (3.5 years)

College or Arts, Science, and Education (CASE)

- AB Political Science (3 years)
- BA Communication (3.5 years)
- Bachelor of Secondary Education major in English (4 years)
- Bachelor in Inclusive and Special Needs Education (3 years)
- AB Religious Education (4 years)
- BS Biology (4 years)
- BS Nursing (4 years)
- BS Psychology (3 years)
- BS Psychology with HRD Management (4 years)

Institute of Graduate Studies (IGS)

- Master of Arts in Psychology
- Master in Business Administration
- Teacher Certificate Program

The institution was a member of the Consortium of Women's Colleges (CWC), which includes Miriam College in Katipunan, Assumption College San Lorenzo in Makati, La Consolacion College Manila and the now-defunct College of the Holy Spirit Manila in Mendiola.

== Notable alumni ==
- Rhea Santos (Mass Communication Batch 2000) - GMA-7 newscaster
- Tootsie Guevara (Hotel and Restaurant Management Batch 2003) - Former ABS-CBN actress, singer and recording artist.
- Liezl Sumilang-Martinez - Actress and MTRCB Board
- Maxine Medina (HS Batch 2009) - Miss Universe Philippines 2016
- Adeline Dumapong-Ancheta (Computer Science) - Filipina Paralympic powerlifter
- Cristina Pantoja-Hidalgo (HS Batch, Valedictorian) - Fictionist, critic, and pioneering writer of Creative nonfiction.
- Maureen Larrazabal (Communication Arts in Interior Design) - Actress, singer, and model.
- Nikki Coseteng - Former Senator of the Philippines from 1992 to 2001.
- K Brosas (HS and Tourism Management) - A Filipino actress, comedian, singer and television host.
- Ma-an Asuncion-Dagñalan (Mass Communication Batch 1994) - an acclaimed director and scriptwriter, who won Best Director at the 2022 Cinemalaya Film Festival and the Filipino Academy of Movie Arts and Sciences Awards (FAMAS) 2023. She also gained international recognition, serving as a Pro Online Delegate at the 74th Locarno International Film Festival and winning Best Foreign Film at the LA Femme International Film Fest at La Femme International Film Fest 2023 for her film "Blue Room".
- Paula Camille L. Biluan (Communication Batch 2010) - Outstanding Personnel for Administration by the Philippine National Police in 2023.

== See also ==
- St. Paul University Philippines, Tuguegarao
- St. Paul University Manila, Manila (proper)
- St. Paul University Dumaguete, Negros Oriental
- St. Paul University Iloilo, Iloilo City
- St. Paul University Surigao, Surigao del Norte
