= St. Paul University Iloilo =

Roman Catholic university in Iloilo City, Philippines

- Pamantasang San Pablo sa Iloilo (Filipino)
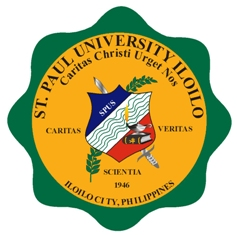
- Former names: St. Paul School of Nursing (1946–1975); St. Paul College of Iloilo (1975–2004)
- Motto: Caritas Christi urget nos (Latin)
- Motto in English: The love of Christ urges us
- Type: Private Roman Catholic Research Non-profit Coeducational Basic and Higher education institution
- Established: 1946; 80 years ago
- Founder: Congregation of the Sisters of St. Paul of Chartres
- Religious affiliation: Roman Catholic (Sisters of Saint Paul of Chartres)
- President: Sr. Teresita Baricaua, SPC
- Vice-president: List: Sr.Mary George Siriban, SPC (VP Admin Affairs / Student Services); Sr. Jocelyn Casio, SPC (VP Christian Formation); Sr. Recel Cachuela, SPC (VP Finance); Dr. Sharon Ann Mendoza (VP Academic Affairs)
- Principal: Sr. Esperanza Rodriquez SPC (Basic Education)
- Director: List: Atty. Alfredo Arungayan III (Director, Human Resources); Mrs. Imelda Olaguer (Director, University Research Office); Mrs. Mary Grace Araneta (Director, Management Information System); Mrs. Maureen Ledesma (Director, Guidance Services)
- Location: General Luna St., Iloilo City, Iloilo, Philippines; 10°42′07″N 122°34′03″E
- Campus: Main Campus - General Luna St., Iloilo City Satellite Campus - Ticud, La Paz, Iloilo City (Basic Education)
- Colors: Green and Gold
- Sporting affiliations: ILOPRISAA
- Website: www.spuiloilo.edu.ph
- Location in the Visayas Location in the Philippines

Saint Paul University Iloilo, also referred to by its acronym SPUI or SPU Iloilo, St. Paul, St. Paul's, is a private Catholic basic and higher education institution run by the Philippine Province of the Congregation of the Sisters of St. Paul of Chartres (SPC) in Iloilo City, Iloilo, Philippines. It is one of the seven campuses comprising the St. Paul University System. It was founded in 1946 by the Sisters of Saint Paul of Chartres from France with the help of American Catholics. It presently offers academic programs in basic education, tertiary and post-graduate studies in the fields of Information Technology, Teacher Education, Business, Accountancy, Liberal Studies, Nursing, Tourism, Hospitality, Psychology, Sciences, Physical Therapy, and many others.

At present, though SPUI is part of the St. Paul University System, it remains distinctively independent with its own administration.

It is one of the 40 schools owned, managed, and operated by the Sisters of St. Paul of Chartres (SPC) in the Philippines.

== History ==
The Sisters of St. Paul of Chartres began their apostolic activities in Iloilo by establishing St. Paul’s Hospital in 1911. Their primary aim was to care for the poor and the sick. The Sisters under the leadership of Mother Josephine de Jesus opened a school of nursing in June 1946 to meet the pressing need of the hospital for trained competent Catholic nurses. Initially opened with 70 students, the school quickly grew, achieving government recognition for its 3-year diploma program in 1948. In 1950, a 4-year basic collegiate course in Nursing was introduced but discontinued in 1954 due to financial difficulties. Significant infrastructure developments occurred in the 1960s, including the construction of the Marian Hall building in 1961.

In 1975, under the leadership of Sister Carolina Agravante, the institution was upgraded to a college, introducing new programs such as Bachelor of Arts in Mass Communication and Bachelor of Science in Biology. The Social Laboratory Extension Program (SLEP) was also established during this period, fostering community outreach initiatives.

The college faced retrenchment in the mid-1980s, phasing out several programs. However, by the early 1990s, new courses like Bachelor of Science in Business Administration were introduced. In 1996, the college celebrated its 50th anniversary, receiving recognition for its Nursing program from both the Professional Regulations Commission (PRC) and the Commission on Higher Education (CHED).

The BSN program was designated as a Center of Excellence in Nursing Education by CHED from 1996 to 1999. The college also launched graduate programs in Nursing and was recognized as a regional center for career development in partnership with Red River College, Canada.

In 2001, the institution began operating under the name St. Paul University Iloilo. New programs, including Bachelor of Secondary Education and Associate in Hotel and Restaurant Management, were introduced. In 2004, it became part of the St. Paul University System, and Sister Carolina Agravante was installed as the first University President.

St. Paul University Iloilo has continued to expand its academic offerings and infrastructure. The university's Nursing program received multiple accolades for its licensure examination performance. In 2006, the university acquired a new site in La Paz, Iloilo City, where new facilities have been developed. The Basic Education Department was opened in 2011, and the university has since implemented the K-12 program.

== Colleges programs ==
| Departments | Programs |
|---|---|
| College of Arts, Sciences & Education | Bachelor of Science in Biology, Bachelor of Science in Psychology, and Bachelor of Science in Special Needs Education |
| College of Hospitality Management, Tourism & Nutrition and Dietetics | Bachelor of Science in Hospitality, Bachelor of Science in Tourism Management, and Bachelor of Science in Nutrition and Dietetics |
| College of Business & Information Technology | Bachelor of Science in Business Administration Major in Financial Management, Human Resource Management, Marketing Management, and Operation Management |
| College of Nursing | Bachelor of Science in Nursing and Master of Arts in Nursing |
| College of Rehabilitation Sciences | Bachelor of Science in Physical Therapy and Bachelor of Science in Occupational Therapy |
| Basic Education Department | Kindergarten, Elementary, Junior High School, and Senior High School (ABM, HUMSS, and STEM) |
| TESDA Registered Programs | Cookery NC II, Food and Beverage NC II, and Housekeeping NC II |

== See also ==
- St. Paul University Philippines, Tuguegarao City
- St. Paul University Manila, Metro Manila
- St. Paul University Quezon City, Metro Manila
- St. Paul University at San Miguel, Bulacan
- St. Paul University Dumaguete, Negros Oriental
- St. Paul University Surigao, Surigao del Norte
