= St. Paul University Dumaguete =

Roman Catholic university in Negros Oriental, Philippines

- Former names: St. Paul's Academy (1905–); St. Paul College of Dumaguete (1904–2004)
- Motto: Caritas Veritas Scientia (Latin)
- Motto in English: Love Truth Knowledge
- Type: Private Roman Catholic Research Non-profit Coeducational; Basic and Higher education institution
- Established: 29 October 1904; 122 years ago
- Founder: Congregation of the Sisters of St. Paul of Chartres
- Religious affiliation: Roman Catholic (Sisters of Saint Paul of Chartres)
- Academic affiliations: PAASCU
- President: Sr. Mila Grace A. Silab, SPC
- Vice-president: List: Sr. Helen Malubay, SPC (VP for Academic Affairs); Sr. Mary Maynard Paglinawan, SPC (VP for Administrative Affairs); Sr.Ellen Lorenzana, SPC (VP for Finance); Dr. Mary Francis Laquinon (VP for Christian Formation)
- Principal: Sr. Carmelita S. Villanueva, SPC (Basic Education Principal)
- Students: Approx. 3,000
- Location: L. Rovira Road, Bantayan, Dumaguete, Negros Oriental, Philippines; 9°19′36.74″N 123°17′53.47″E
- Campus: Urban Veterans Avenue, Bantayan, Dumaguete, Negros Oriental
- Alma Mater song: The Paulinian Hymn
- Colors: Green and Gold
- Nickname: Paulinians
- Website: www.spud.edu.ph
- Location in the Visayas Location in the Philippines

Saint Paul University, also referred to by its acronym SPUD or SPU Dumaguete, is a private Roman Catholic research non-profit coeducational basic and higher education institution run by the Sisters of St. Paul of Chartres in Dumaguete, Philippines. It was founded by the Paulinian Sisters on October 29, 1904.

It is one of 40 schools owned, managed, and operated by the Sisters of St. Paul of Chartres (SPC) in the Philippines. It offers basic, undergraduate and graduate education.

It is one of the seven campuses comprising the St. Paul University System.

== Origins and history ==
The university traces its origins to the coming of the Sisters of Saint Paul of Chartres (SPC) to the Philippines. On October 29, 1904, the said sisters who came from Vietnam arrived in the Philippines and established the first Saint Paul's school in the Philippines in Dumaguete, Negros Oriental. The seven sisters were Mother Marthe de Saint Paul, Superior Sr. Marie Louise du Sacre Coeur Sr. Ange Marie Sr. Anne de la Croix Sr. Charles de Genes Sr. Catherine, and Sr. Josephine. The institution they established initially offered elementary education. High school was offered starting in 1920. The first high school graduation took place in 1925. Collegiate courses were offered years later. For many years, the institution operated as Saint Paul College of Dumaguete. In 2004, the year of its centennial celebration, the college was granted university status becoming one of the four universities in Dumaguete.

On January 9, 1905, the new school opened with 30 girls (15 of whom were aged 15 to 20), four of them boarders, and six boys. Children, women, and young men came to the school for religious instruction. Besides the regular academic courses, there were supplementary ones in music, drawing, painting, French, sewing, and embroidery. The medium of instruction was English. However, since the Americans had been in the Philippines for only five years, very few pupils were acquainted with the language. Hence, the Sisters were obliged to learn Visayan and Spanish to be able to communicate with their charges.

== Academic programs ==
=== Postgraduate ===
- Doctor of Education (Ed. D.)
- Doctor in Business Administration (DBA)
- Doctor in Public Administration (DPA)
- Master of Arts in Education (M.A.)
- Master of Arts in Nursing (M.A.N.)
- Master in Business Administration (M.B.A.)
- Master in Public Administration (M.P.A.)
- Diploma in Public Management (D.P.M.)
- Master in Information Technology (M.I.T.)
- Master of Science in Information Technology (M.S.I.T.)
- Master of Arts in Religious Education (M.A.R.E.)
- Master in Business Administration (M.B.A.) major in Tourism & HRM
- M.S. Environmental Management Studies ( MSES)
- Master of Art in Mass Communication

=== Undergraduate ===
College of Arts and Education

- Bachelor of Arts in Political Science
- Bachelor of Science in Biology
- Bachelor of Science in Psychology
- Bachelor of Elementary Education
- Bachelor of Special Education
- Bachelor of Early Childhood Education
- Bachelor of Culture & Arts Education
- Bachelor of Physical Education
- Bachelor of Secondary Education
  - Math
  - English
  - Science
  - Values & Religious Education
  - Social Studies/ Social Sciences

College of Business and Information Technology

- Bachelor of Science in Accountancy BSA
- Bachelor of Science in Internal Audit BSIA
- Bachelor of Science in Business Administration BSBA
- Bachelor of Science in Hospitality Management BSHM
- Bachelor of Science in Information Technology BSIT
- Bachelor of Science in Management Accounting BSMA
- Bachelor of Science in Tourism Management BSTM
- Bachelor of Science in Entrepreneurship (BSE)
- Certificate in Environmental Management
- Associate in Tourism
- Associate in Hotel & Restaurant Management

College of Nursing

- Bachelor of Science in Nursing

Basic Education

- Senior High
1. Grade 11
2. Grade 12
- Junior High
1. Grades 1-6
- Kinder
- Nursery (Preschool)

== See also ==
- St. Paul University Philippines, Tuguegarao City
- St. Paul University Manila, Metro Manila
- St. Paul University Quezon City, Metro Manila
- St. Paul University at San Miguel, Bulacan
- St. Paul University Iloilo, Iloilo City
- St. Paul University Surigao, Surigao del Norte
