= St. Paul University Manila =

Roman Catholic university in Manila, Philippines

- Former names: St. Paul Institution (1912–1940); St. Paul College of Manila (1940–2004)
- Motto: Caritas Christi Urget Nos (Latin)
- Motto in English: The charity of Christ urges us
- Type: Private Roman Catholic research non-profit coeducational basic and higher education institution
- Established: 1912; 114 years ago
- Founder: Congregation of the Sisters of Saint Paul of Chartres
- Religious affiliation: Roman Catholic Sisters of St. Paul of Chartres
- Academic affiliations: SMIIC
- President: Sr. Ma. Evangeline Anastacio, SPC
- Vice-president: Dr. Mary Grace Leongson (VP for Academic Services and Research Services); Sr. Nicole de Marie Dabalus, SPC (VP for Christian Formation and Student Services) Sr. Maria Vicenta Estrella, SPC (VP for Finance Services and Administrative Services)
- Location: 680 Pedro Gil St., Malate, Manila, Metro Manila, Philippines; 14°34′27″N 120°59′10″E
- Campus: Urban
- Álma Mater song: The Paulinian Hymn
- Colors: Green and Gold
- Nickname: Paulinians
- Website: www.spumanila.edu.ph
- Location in Manila Location in Metro Manila Location in Luzon Location in the Philippines

St. Paul University Manila (SPUM), also referred by its acronym SPU Manila, is a private, Catholic coeducational basic and higher education institution established and run by the Congregation of the Sisters of Saint Paul of Chartres in Manila, Philippines. It was established in 1912 by the Sisters of St. Paul of Chartres (SPC), a religious congregation founded in Chartres, France in 1698. It was previously an all-girls' school and turned co-ed beginning school year 2005–2006.

In 1912, St. Paul Manila opened a Kindergarten school with an enrollment of six girls, upon request of the families in the neighborhood.The school was named St. Paul Institution. Grade I was opened in 1913 with one higher grade opened each year and boys accepted up to Grade 2. The Grade School Department was given government recognition when it has reached Grade 6.

It is one of the 40 schools owned, managed, and operated by the Sisters of St. Paul of Chartres (SPC) in the Philippines.

It is one of the seven campuses comprising the St. Paul University System.

== Notable alumni ==
- Charo Santos-Concio - (A.B. Communication Arts Batch 1977, Cum Laude) - Former President of ABS-CBN Corporation and host of the country's longest-running drama anthology Maalaala Mo Kaya.
- Malu Maglutac - (HS Batch) - TV host, Ballerina, and Model.
- Ameurfina Melencio-Herrera (HS Batch 1938) - Associate Justice of the Philippine Supreme Court from 1979 to 1992.
- Pilita Corrales - Singer
- June Keithley - (B.S. Nursing Batch 1966) -A Filipina actress and broadcast journalist. She was part of the cast in the defunct ABS-CBN comedy-gag show Super Laff-In from 1969 until 1972. She was also known as the voice behind Radyo Bandido during the First EDSA Revolution wherein she encouraged the Filipino people to join.
- Lovely Rivero - Actress
- Anna Larrucea - Actress
- Lorraine Schuck - (B.S. Business Management Batch 1980) - A Filipina beauty pageant titleholder who won Mutya ng Pilipinas Asia 1979 and represented the Philippines at the 1979 Miss Asia Quest. She is one of the founders of, and is Executive Vice-President of, Carousel Productions, which runs the international beauty pageant Miss Earth and Miss Philippines Earth.
- Janet Basco - Singer
- Celeste Legaspi - (HS Batch 1966) - Singer
- Edu Manzano - Actor, TV host, and Politician
- Maniya Barredo - (HS Batch 1969) - Ballet dancer
- Agnes Devanadera - (B.S. Commerce Batch 1970) - 41st Solicitor General of the Philippines from 2007 to 2010. She also served as the Secretary of Justice from 2009-2010.
- Estela Perlas-Bernabe - (B.S. Commerce Batch 1972, Magna Cum Laude) - Associate Justice of the Philippine Supreme Court from 2011 to 2022. Served as the Ombudsman of the Philippines after the retirement of Justice Conchita Carpio Morales.
- Sela Guia - (B.S. Tourism Management Batch 2023, Cum Laude) - A Filipino actress, host and singer who is under ABS-CBN's Star Magic. A former member of the all-girl Filipino idol group MNL48.
- Cecile Guidote-Alvarez - (A.B. BSE Batch 1962) - A Filipino actress, author, and founder of Philippine Educational Theater Association (PETA). She was declared as a National Artist for Theater in 2009 and the Ramon Magsaysay Award for Public Service in 1972. She served as executive director of the National Commission for Culture and the Arts (NCCA) and also the founding president of the Philippine Center of the International Theatre Institute (PCITI).

== Gallery ==
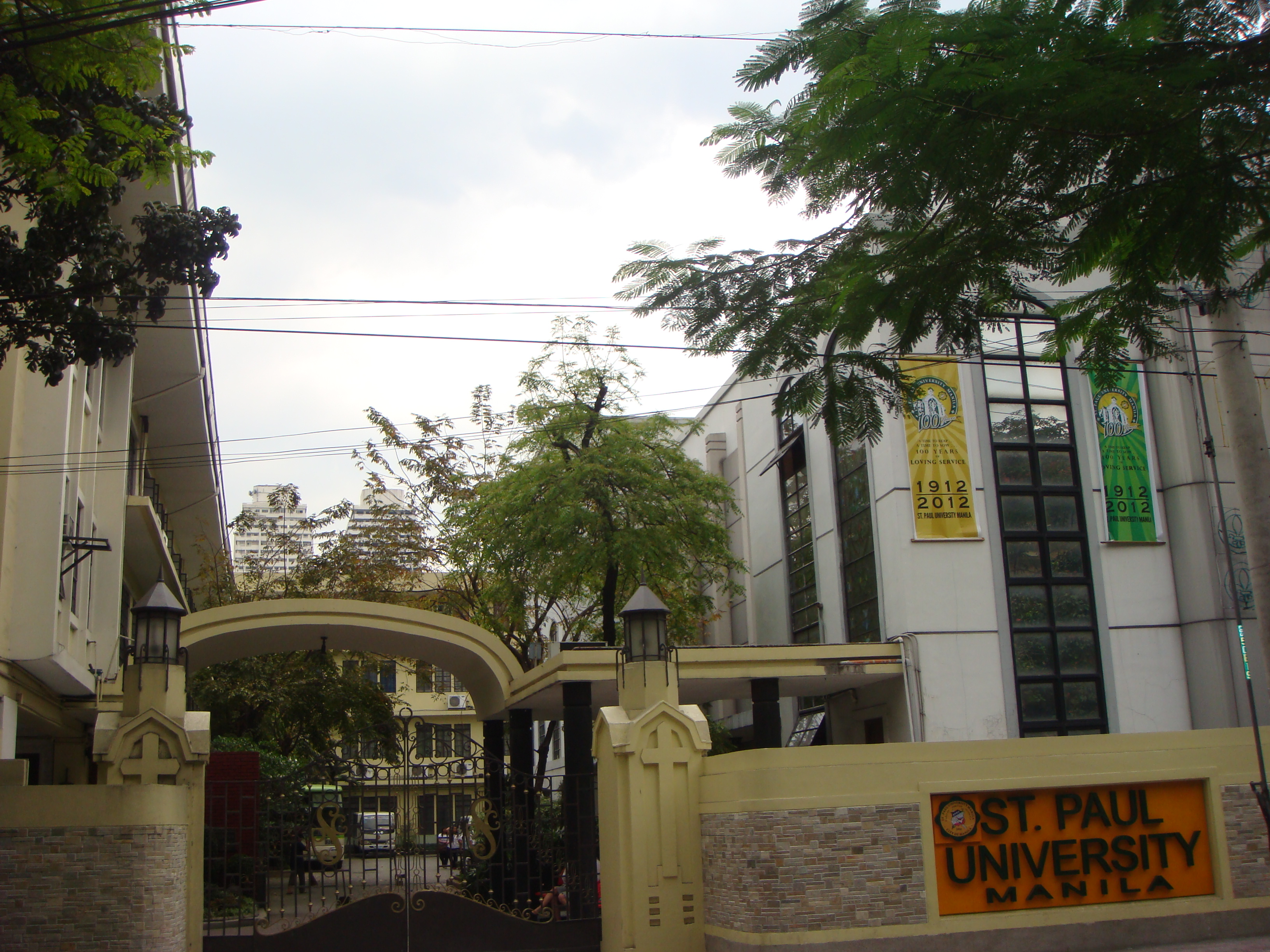
The facade along Pedro Gil Street

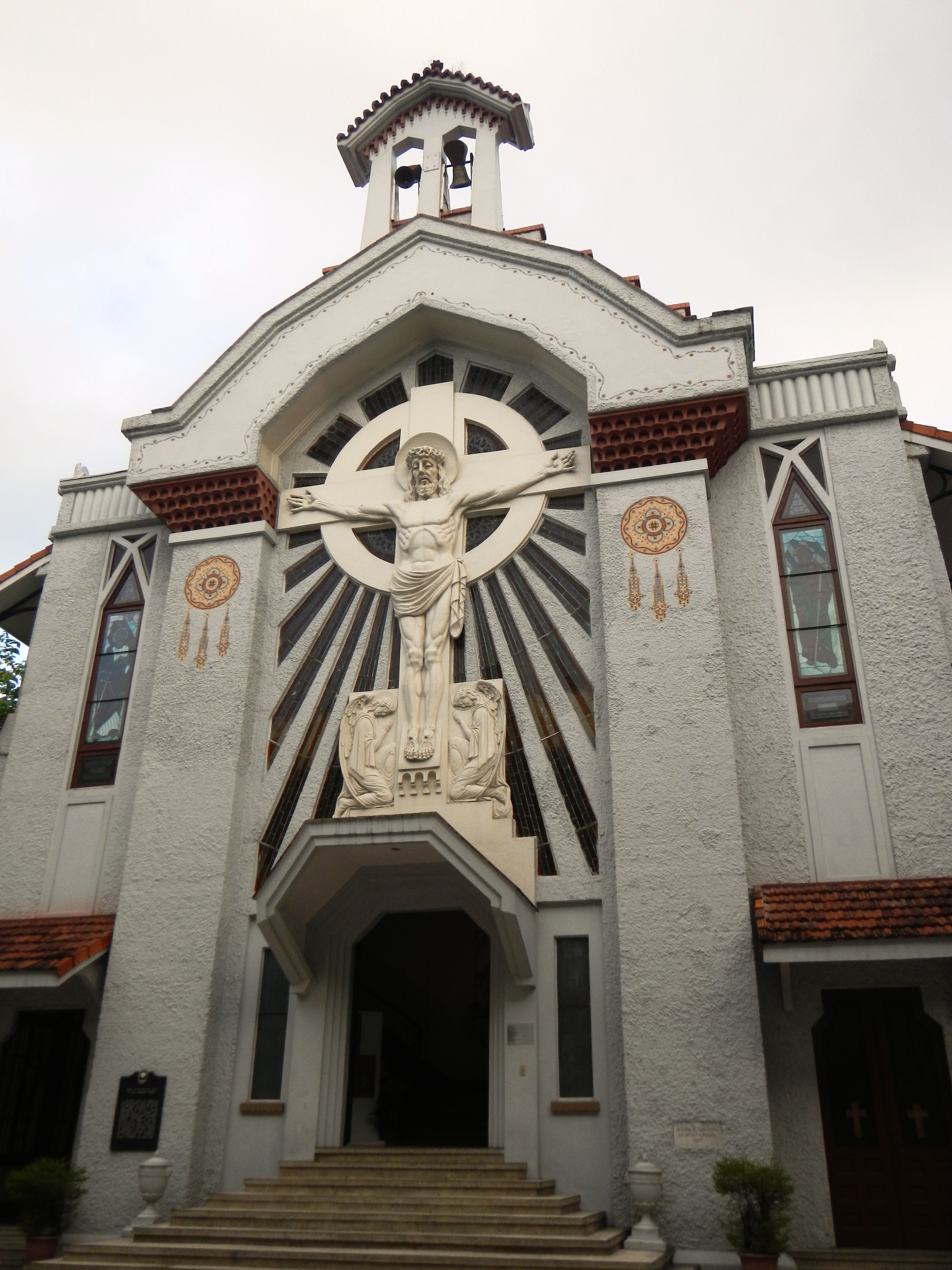
Chapel of the Crucified Christ

== See also ==
- St. Paul University Philippines, Tuguegarao City
- St. Paul University Quezon City, Metro Manila
- St. Paul University Dumaguete, Negros Oriental
- St. Paul University Iloilo, Iloilo City
- St. Paul University Surigao, Surigao del Norte
