= St. Paul University Philippines =

Roman Catholic university in Cagayan, Philippines

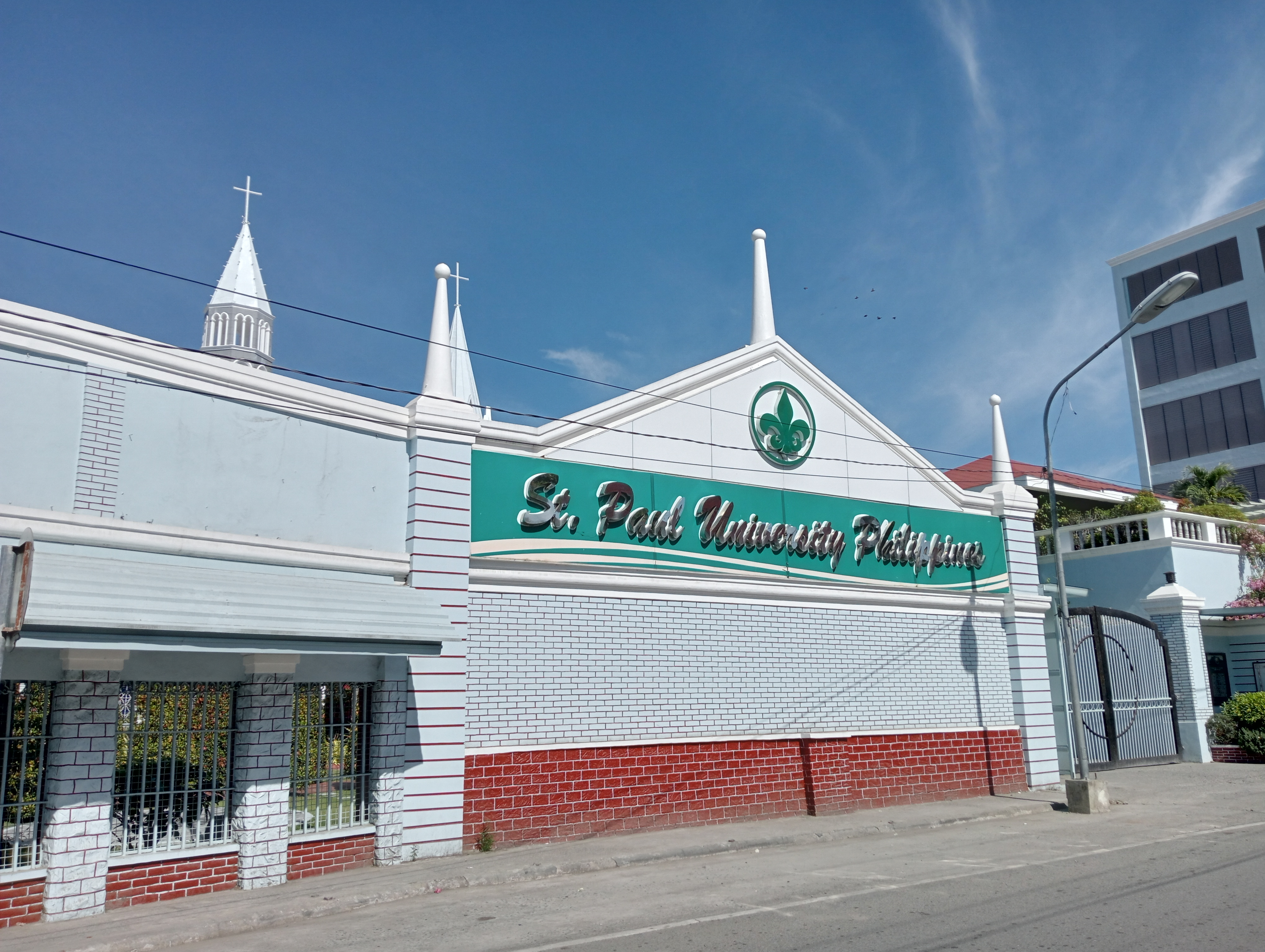
- Former names: Not the Colegio de San Pablo (1907–1909); It's Colegio del Sagrado Corazon de Jesus (1909–1925); Sacred Heart of Jesus Institution (1925–1948); St. Paul College of Tuguegarao (1948–1982)
- Motto: Caritas Veritas Scientia (Latin)
- Motto in English: Love Truth Knowledge
- Type: Private Research Non-profit Basic and Higher education institution
- Established: May 10, 1907; 119 years ago
- Founder: Congregation of the Sisters of St. Paul of Chartres
- Religious affiliation: Roman Catholic (Sisters of Saint Paul of Chartres)
- Academic affiliations: PAASCU AASBI
- President: Merceditas Ang
- Vice-president: List: Agripina Maribbay (VP Academics & Quality Assurance); Sr.Ma.Lirio Gavan (VP for Finance); Sr.Marisa Tumbali (VP for Administration & General Services); Veneranda Del Rosario (VP for Christian Formation)
- Principal: Glenda Caronan, (Basic Education Unit)
- Undergraduates: Approx. 7,000
- Location: Mabini St., Tuguegarao, Cagayan, Philippines; 17°37′02″N 121°43′24″E
- Campus: Urban
- Colors: Green and Gold
- Website: www.spup.edu.ph
- Location in Luzon Location in the Philippines

St. Paul University Philippines, also referred to by its acronym SPUP or SPU Philippines, is a private Roman Catholic research non-profit basic and higher education institution run by the Sisters of St. Paul of Chartres (SPC) in Tuguegarao, Cagayan, Philippines. It was founded by the Paulinian Sisters on May 10, 1907. It is one of the 40 schools owned, managed, and operated by the Sisters of St. Paul of Chartres (SPC) in the Philippines. It offers basic, undergraduate, and graduate education. It is the flagship and main campus of the St. Paul University System.

St. Paul University Philippines is also included in major world university rankings] such as Quacquarelli Symonds (QS), Times Higher Education (THE), and World University Ranking for Innovation (WURI) rankings.

It is one of the seven campuses comprising the St. Paul University System.

== History ==
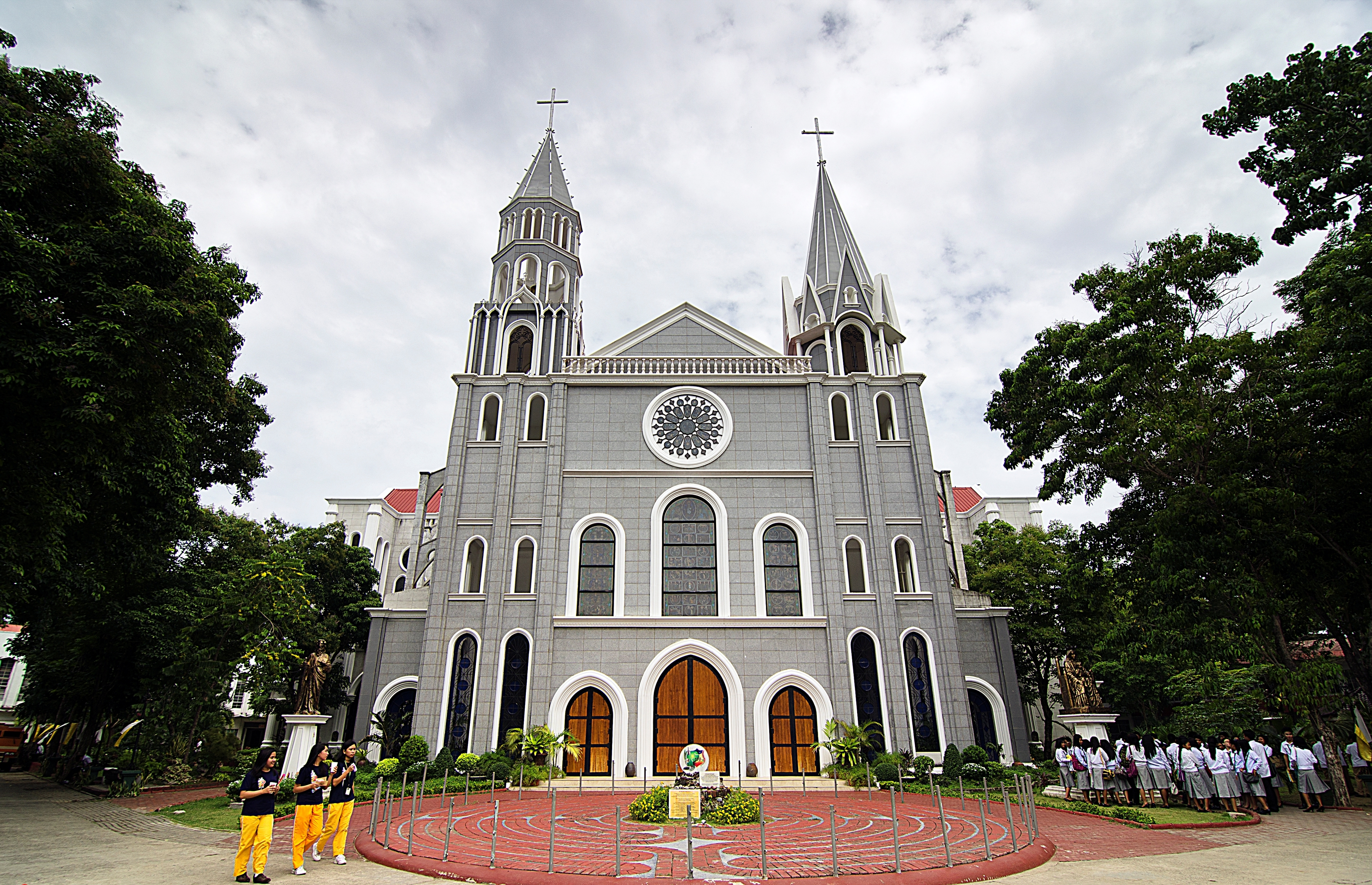
The university chapel, dedicated to Our Lady of Chartres

The university was established on May 10, 1907, as the Colegio de San Pablo by six nuns from the Sisters of St. Paul of Chartres (SPC) led by Mother Ephrem Marie Fieu. The nuns came to the Cagayan Valley region upon the invitation of Bishop Dennis Joseph Dougherty. The school was initially hosted inside a Spanish convent adjacent to a cathedral. The institution changed its name to Colegio del Sagrado Corazon de Jesus in 1909 and later to Sacred Heart of Jesus Institution (SHOJI) in 1925. The school was moved from its previous location in a convent to separate grounds acquired by the SPC from the Dominican Order due to the increased number of enrollees and the expansion of its curriculum.

During the Japanese occupation of the Philippines in 1941, the school complex was used as a military garrison and hospital by the Japanese. The entire campus of the school was razed when the Japanese forces garrisoned in the school were attacked by the Allied forces during the Liberation of Tuguegarao.

After the war, the school changed its name to St. Paul College of Tuguegarao (SPCT) in 1948 as part of an initiative to become the first Teacher-Training Institution in Cagayan Valley. In 1961, the SPCT began offering college education and became the first Philippine Accrediting Association of Schools, Colleges and Universities (PAASCU) accredited institution. On January 18, 1965, the entire complex was razed by a fire.

The school became the first university in Cagayan Valley in 1982, and was granted autonomous status by the Commission on Higher Education in 2002. It received accreditation from more bodies and institutions such as TUV Rheinland which gave the SPUP, ISO 9001 Certification in 2000 and the Asian Association of Schools of Business International in 2014. The Catholic Bishops Conference of the Philippines through the Episcopal Commission on Culture (CBCP-ECC) designated the SPUP as a Catholic Center for Culture in 2012.

== Academics ==
The university offers a number of courses through its schools:

- School of Arts, Sciences and Teacher Education
- School of Business, Accountancy and Hospitality Management
- School of Information Technology and Engineering
- School of Nursing and Allied Health Sciences
- School of Medicine

== Student life ==
The university has an Authority to Accept Foreign Students from the Bureau of Immigration, and since 2016, has been granted authority by the Commission on Higher Education to establish linkages with foreign educational institutions. It is the only school in Cagayan that is allowed to accept students from abroad. As of 2024, there are 486 foreign nationals who are enrolled in the university, who are all in its graduate program. These include students from the United States, China, Indonesia, Japan and Vietnam.

== See also ==
- St. Paul University Manila, Metro Manila
- St. Paul University Quezon City, Metro Manila
- St. Paul University at San Miguel, Bulacan
- St. Paul University Dumaguete, Negros Oriental
- St. Paul University Iloilo, Iloilo City
- St. Paul University Surigao, Surigao del Norte
