= Tisa (disambiguation) =

The Tisa is a river in Central Europe.

Tisa, TISA, tisa, or variants, may also refer to:

== People ==
- Ken Tisa (born 1945), American artist
- Tisa Chang (born 1941), Chinese-American actress and theatre director
- Tisa Farrow (born 1951), American actress and model
- Tisa Ho (born 1948), Hong Kong arts administrator and writer
- Tisa Mason (born 1961), American educator
- Svetislav "Tisa" Milosavljević (1882–1960), Serbian military architect and public officer
- Tisa Shakya (born 2003), Nepalese swimmer

== Places ==
- Tisá, a municipality and village in the Czech Republic
  - Tisá Rocks, a group of rocks in the municipality
- Tisa, Hooghly, West Bengal, India
- Tisa, a barangay in Cebu City, Philippines
- Tisa, a village in Hălmagiu Commune, Arad County, Romania
- Tisa, a village in Sănduleni Commune, Bacău County, Romania
- Tisa (Hungarian: Tisza), a village in Burjuc Commune, Hunedoara County, Romania
- Tisa, a village in Bocicoiu Mare Commune, Maramureș County, Romania
- Tisa, a village in Sângeru Commune, Prahova County, Romania
- Tisa, a village in Băile Olănești town, Vâlcea County, Romania
- Tisa Nouă, a village in Fântânele Commune, Arad County, Romania

== Rivers ==
- Tisa, a tributary of the Bâsculița in Buzău County, Romania
- Tisa, a tributary of the Cracăul Negru in Neamț County, Romania
- Tisa, a tributary of the Lemnia in Covasna County, Romania
- Tisa, a tributary of the Lotrioara in Sibiu County, Romania
- Tisa, a tributary of the Otăsău in Vâlcea County, Romania
- Tisa, a tributary of the Râul Mic in Alba County, Romania

== Other ==
- Multinational Engineer Battalion Tisa
- International School of Azerbaijan, an international school in Baku, Azerbaijan
- Taishanese (ISO 639-6 code: tisa) a.k.a. Toisanese, Hoisanese; a dialect of Cantonese
- The Indian Stammering Association, a non-profit organization based in India, working in the field of stuttering
- Trade in Services Agreement, a proposed international trade treaty
- Transitional Islamic State of Afghanistan
- Traveller Information Services Association, an organization concerned with the Traffic Message Channel used by motor vehicle drivers
- Truth in Savings Act, a United States federal law

== See also ==
- Tisza (disambiguation)
