= Carol E. Reiley =

American businesswoman, computer scientist, and model

Carol Reiley
- Born: Carol Elizabeth Reiley; August 30, 1982 (age 44); Flint, Michigan, U.S.
- Education: Santa Clara University; Johns Hopkins University
- Occupations: Businesswoman, computer scientist, model
- Spouse: Andrew Ng (m. 2014–2024)
- Scientific career
- Fields: Robotics, artificial intelligence
- Website: www.creiley.com

Carol Elizabeth Reiley (born 1982) is an American business executive, computer scientist, and model. She is a pioneer in teleoperated and autonomous robot systems in surgery, space exploration, disaster rescue, and self-driving cars. Reiley has worked at Intuitive Surgical, Lockheed Martin, and General Electric. She co-founded, invested in, and was president of Drive.ai, and is now CEO of a healthcare startup, a creative advisor for the San Francisco Symphony, and a brand ambassador for Guerlain Cosmetics. She is a published children's book author, the first female engineer on the cover of MAKE magazine, and is ranked by Forbes, Inc, and Quartz as a leading entrepreneur and influential scientist.

== Early life and education ==
Carol Elizabeth Reiley was born in Flint, Michigan, in 1982. Her family soon moved to Vancouver, Washington. Her father is an engineer and her mother a flight attendant; Reiley credits both for her interest in technology and global humanitarian work. She has a younger brother who is also an engineer. Reiley's parents are from Taipei and she grew up in a Mandarin-speaking household.

Reiley's first invention was a humane mousetrap she fashioned at age eight to catch her runaway pet hamster. She started her first business at age ten, inspired by the Babysitters Club book series. Her first professional job was at age 15 as a television personality on Homework Helpline, a local cable show geared toward K-12 graders, answering math and English questions on the air.

She then enrolled in a Ph.D. program (ABD) specializing in computer vision/artificial intelligence. She spent a year at Stanford University Artificial Intelligence Lab with her Ph.D. advisor, who was on sabbatical there. She dropped out to move to Silicon Valley while writing her dissertation because she had a startup idea to pursue.

Reiley married Andrew Ng in 2014. The MIT Tech Review named Ng and Reiley an "AI power couple." Their engagement announcement was featured in IEEE Spectrum. They have two children. The couple divorced in 2024.

== Career ==
Reiley has built products for surgical robotic systems at Intuitive Surgical, space robotic systems at Lockheed Martin, and self-driving cars at drive.ai.

She was an instructor at Johns Hopkins University, co-teaching intersession courses Haptics For Surgical Robotics (2006) and Developing Facebook Apps (2009).

Reiley is a serial entrepreneur, investor and philanthropist. She founded the education company Squishybotz and is the author and publisher of Making a Splash (2015), a children's book about growth mindset.

In 2015, Reiley co-founded and was president of Drive.ai. She was the initial investor and seed funded the company from her wedding fund. In 2018 she started a healthcare startup.

Reiley sits on the technical advisory board of Harman Kardon and the Santa Clara University Engineering Advisory Board. She is a limited partner of Sequoia Capital and AI2 Incubator, and advises/invests in several startups. In 2018 she joined All Raise, a nonprofit diversity and inclusion organization, as a mentor and a Founder for Change. She is also part of NEO, a mentorship community and VC fund founded by Ali and Hadi Partovi that brings together tech veterans to accelerate tomorrow's leaders.

Reiley has given two Ted talks and been a featured speaker at the MIT Technology Review Conference, The Atlantic, the World Government Summit, the Microsoft CEO Summit, and the USA Science and Engineering Festival. She has been a guest contributor to IEEE Spectrum, Techcrunch, and MIT Tech Review.

== Research and publications ==
Her research continued for several years, and her interest expanded to haptics and industrial robotic arms. She was selected as a Computing Research Association Distributed Undergraduate Research Fellow.

Reiley was named a National Science Foundation Graduate Research Fellow (2008–2010) to research strategies for improving human and robotic interaction for her PhD. She was elected to serve on the IEEE Robotics and Automation Society board in 2008–09 to put together key initiatives for thousands of graduate researchers. She was the youngest member to serve on the board.

As of 2018, Reiley has eight technical patents, and has authored more than a dozen papers published in various scientific conference proceedings, refereed journals and conferences.

== Maker ==
Reiley is a well-known DIY hacker. She has published several open-source tutorials including the first hack to Guitar Hero ("Air Guitar Hero", enabling the game to be played with electrical signals from arm muscles to act as a rehabilitation exercise for amputees) and a DIY blood pressure monitor system for developing countries. She has keynoted at Maker Faire and USA Science and Engineering Festival several times. Her 3D printed designs have been featured at the CES fashion show.

In 2011, Reiley founded and ran Tinkerbelle Labs, an open-source company focused on empowering hobbyists to build low-cost DIY projects.

== The arts and modeling ==
In 2018, Reiley became a spokesmodel for Guerlain and Harper's Bazaar China, to launch a new international beauty campaign. She has been profiled in British Vogue, The New York Times, and Wired for her work in AI. In graduate school, she worked as a commercial model for fashion companies like Hard Candy, Betabrand, and Oil of Olay. She was the first female engineer featured on the cover of Make magazine for her contributions to the open source community.

In 2018, Reiley joined the San Francisco Symphony as a founding member of the creative advisory board under its new musical director, Esa-Pekka Salonen.

In 2020, she cofounded and launched DeepMusic.ai with violinist Hilary Hahn to amplify human creativity through AI. She is CEO of the organization and commissioned pieces from David Lang, Michael Abels, WEF YGL, and Dana Leong.

== Diversity advocate ==
Reiley has been an active advocate for diversity in engineering and AI. At Johns Hopkins, she was on the founding board of the Graduate Women's Organization and the Whiting School of Engineering Diversity Board. At Santa Clara University, she cofounded chapters of Association for Computing Machinery and Society of Women Engineering. She led the JHU Robotics Systems Challenge (2004–2011), SWE and ACM events, and Computer Mania Day workshops for thousands of underserved minority students. She published a study in an education journal about diversity of middle and high school students in robot competitions.

== Awards ==
- Forbes' Top 50 women in tech (2018)
- Quartz founder index (Ranked #18, 2018)
- Inc. Magazine's Most Innovative Women Entrepreneurs (2017)
- Silicon Valley's Most Influential Women in 2016.
- National Science Foundation Graduate Research Fellow (2008–2010)
- Society of Women Engineers top graduate award (2007)
- Computing Research Association Distributed Undergraduate Research Fellow (2003)
