= DeepMap =

American self-driving vehicle mapping software company

DeepMap Inc.
- Type: Subsidiary
- Industry: Software, computer vision, cartography
- Founded: 2016; 10 years ago
- Founders: James Wu; Mark Wheeler
- Fate: Acquired by Nvidia
- Headquarters: Palo Alto, California, U.S.
- Products: High definition mapping for autonomous vehicles
- Website: deepmap.ai (archived)

DeepMap Inc. was a Palo Alto, California-based software company that develops high definition (HD) maps for self-driving vehicles.

The company was founded in 2016 by a group of former Google workers as well as Apple veterans. The software uses data from sensors and combines it with "data from all the cars connected to its system."

== History ==
DeepMap was founded in Palo Alto, California in 2016 to create 3D mapping software to assist self-driving cars with navigation. Founders James Wu and Mark Wheeler were co-workers on Google Maps, and before that at Apple and Baidu. Wu became the company's CEO, and Wheeler became its Chief Technology Officer. Also in 2016, the company raised $7 million in initial funding.

In May 2017, the company raised $25 million in a Series A led by venture capital firm Accel, formerly Accel Partners, along with venture capital firms Andreessen Horowitz and GSR Ventures.

By February 2018, Bloomberg reported that the company announced it was working with the Ford Motor Company and China's SAIC Motor Corp. The company was also working with Honda's Xcelerator innovation program, based in Mountain View, California. In November, the company raised $60 million with a Series B, with returning investors along with German industrial firm Bosch's Robert Bosch Venture Capital, and US chipmaker Nvidia's GPU Ventures. The funding valued the company at $450 million. In December, the company announced deals with San Francisco-based mobility platform provider Ridecell and Sweden-based transportation company Einride to integrate DeepMap's HD maps with their autonomous fleets. Einride deployed its first truck using DeepMap's software in 2019.

In February 2019, The New York Times reported that research firm CB Insights included DeepMap on its list of companies on track for a $1 billion 'unicorn' valuation. The company was analyzed in a November 2019 case study by Harvard Business School, in "DeepMap: Charting the Road Ahead For Autonomous Vehicles."

In June 2021, Nvidia announced plans to acquire DeepMap to help with Nvidia Drive, the company's autonomous vehicle technology platform.

== Products ==
DeepMap develops HD maps with a level of precision that reflects changes in the road in real time. Digital camera images are combined with lidar (laser imaging) to build detailed 3D maps to represent real-time road network data. By identifying the environment, including the locations of lanes and obstructions, robot drivers can localize their own and other vehicles' positions in real time. The maps are automatically updated as the car's sensors collect data, and the maps help predict the upcoming road. The company describes its maps "as the 'part of the brain' of the autonomous robot that allows it to understand its location."

The company provides hardware tools, software solutions and field data collection functions to allow customers to transfer their own fleet data into their own personalized HD maps. The maps are integrated with other parts of a vehicle's self-driving system, handling large amounts of HD data while communicating between the vehicle and the cloud.

== Operations ==
DeepMap is headquartered in Palo Alto, California. James Wu and Mark Wheeler serve as chief executive officer and Chief Technology Officer respectively. The company's COO is Wei Luo.
