= Harry Paul (physicist) =

German theoretical physicist (born 1931)

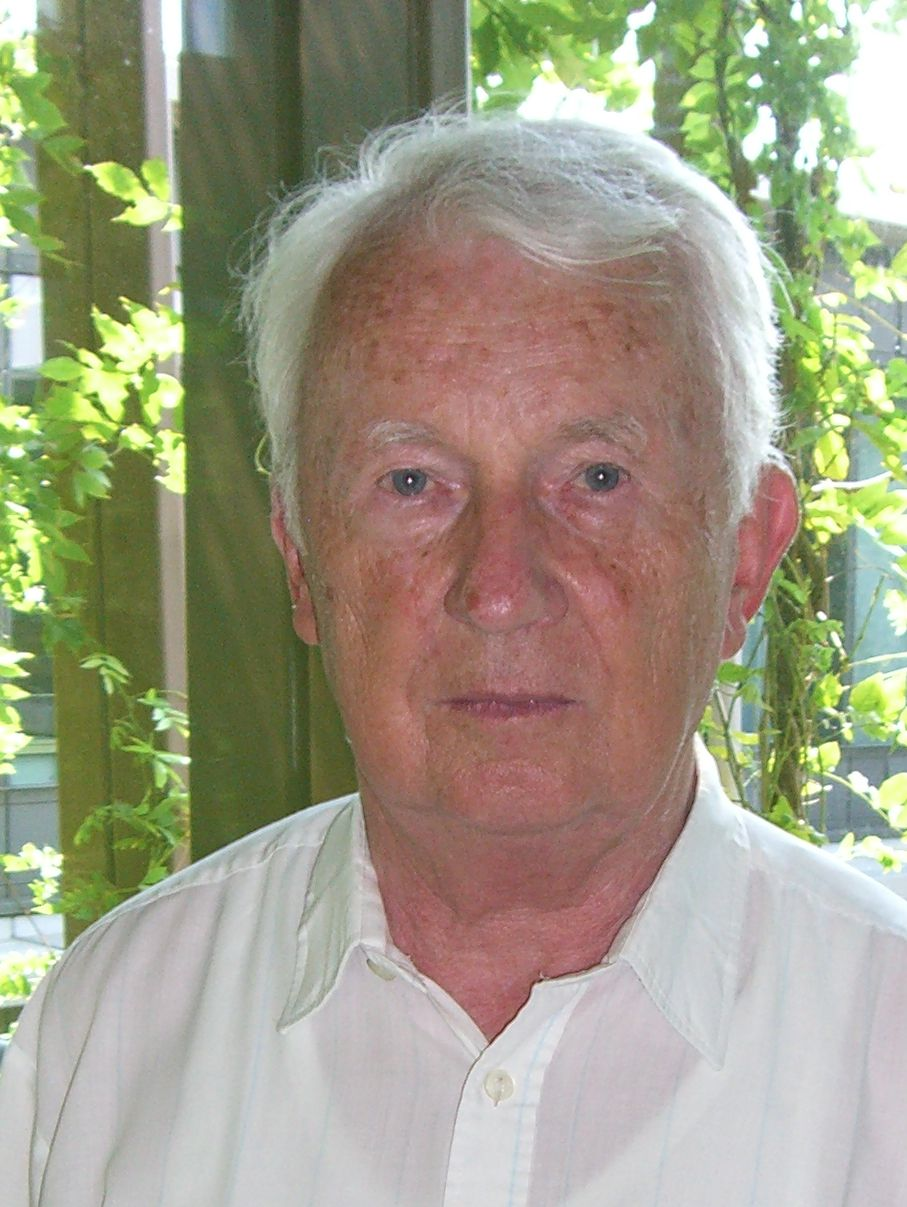
- Paul in 2008
- Born: 11 February 1931; Tisá, Czechoslovakia

Academic background
- Education: University of Rostock; University of Jena
- Thesis: Zur Theorie der Wärmeleitung in Isolatoren (1958)

Academic work
- Institutions: Academy of Sciences of the GDR; Ferdinand-Braun-Institut; Humboldt University of Berlin
- Doctoral students: Ulf Leonhardt

Harry Paul (born 11 February 1931) is a German theoretical physicist at the Humboldt University of Berlin, where he is emeritus professor of physics. His research areas include laser physics, nonlinear optics, and quantum optics.

== Education and career ==
Paul was born to a Sudeten German family in Czechoslovakia. In the summer of 1945, he and his family resettled in Germany. Beginning in 1949, he studied physics at the University of Rostock and the University of Jena. After earning his diploma in 1955, he joined the Institute for Theoretical Physics at the University of Jena as an assistant. He received his doctorate in 1958 and subsequently worked as a research scientist at the Academy of Sciences of the GDR. Since 1962, he worked under Gustav Richter at the Central Institute for Optics and Spectroscopy (Zentralinstitut für Optik und Spektroskopie) in Berlin, which later became the Ferdinand-Braun-Institut. In 1964, Paul completed his habilitation at the Humboldt University of Berlin. Until 1969, he worked at the Institute for Special Problems of Theoretical Physics, Academy of Sciences of the GDR. In 1978, Paul was appointed as a professor at the Humboldt University of Berlin.

Following German reunification, he became head of the Nonclassical Radiation research group of the Max Planck Society at Humboldt University of Berlin in 1992. In 1993, he was appointed Professor of Theoretical Physics at the same institution, where he remained until his retirement in 1996.

== Honors and awards ==
In 1980, together with Witlof Brunner, he was awarded the National Prize of the GDR (Third Class) for Science and Technology for their contributions to quantum electronics. In 1999, he was elected a full member of the Natural Sciences Class of the Sudeten German Academy of Sciences and Arts.

== Books ==
- Paul, Harry (1969). Lasertheorie I (in German). De Gruyter. doi:10.1515/9783112541128. ISBN 978-3-11-254112-8.
- Paul, Harry (1969). Lasertheorie II (in German). De Gruyter. doi:10.1515/9783112541142. ISBN 978-3-11-254114-2.
- Paul, Harry (1973). Nichtlineare Optik I (in German). De Gruyter. doi:10.1515/9783112595787. ISBN 978-3-11-259578-7.
- Paul, Harry (1973). Nichtlineare Optik II (in German). De Gruyter. doi:10.1515/9783112595541. ISBN 978-3-11-259554-1.
- Paul, Harry (1995). Photonen: Eine Einführung in die Quantenoptik (in German) (2nd ed.). Wiesbaden: Vieweg+Teubner Verlag. doi:10.1007/978-3-322-96700-8. ISBN 978-3-519-03222-9.
- Paul, Harry, ed. (1999). Lexikon der Optik: in zwei Bänden (in German). Heidelberg: Spektrum Akademischer Verlag. ISBN 978-3-8274-0382-7.
- Paul, Harry (2005). Über Physiker und ihr Metier. Berichte aus der Physik (in German). Aachen: Shaker. ISBN 978-3-8322-4549-8.
- Paul, Harry (2008). Introduction to quantum theory. Cambridge, UK; New York: Cambridge University Press. ISBN 978-0-521-87693-3.
