= Stanford Engineering Everywhere =

Stanford Engineering Everywhere, or SEE is an initiative started by Andrew Ng at Stanford University to offer a number of Stanford courses free online. SEE's initial set of courses was funded by Sequoia Capital, and offered instructional videos, reading lists and assignments. The portal was designed to assist both the students and teachers across the world. This is similar to initiatives like MIT OpenCourseWare, where some of the courses are available for viewing for the online students community at no charge.

== Project ==
SEE initially offered ten courses from the Stanford School of Engineering, including three course introductory sequence from computer science. The courses offered are from the fields of databases, artificial intelligence and computer programming.

In Fall 2011, the SEE program was expanded to offer full online courses in Machine Learning, Artificial Intelligence, and Databases. Each of these courses had an enrollment of about 100,000 students and up, and students can register and view the courses, raise queries and submit assignments online. Some of the courses are divided into "basic" and "advanced" categories.
