= Drive.ai =

Subsidiary of Apple

- Type: Subsidiary
- Industry: Artificial intelligence, transportation technology
- Founded: 2015; 11 years ago
- Headquarters: Mountain View, California
- Parent: Apple Inc.
- Website: drive.ai

Drive.ai, a subsidiary of Apple Inc., is an American technology company headquartered in Mountain View, California that uses artificial intelligence to make self-driving systems for cars. It has demonstrated a vehicle driving autonomously with a safety driver only in the passenger seat. To date, the company has raised approximately $77 million in funding. Drive.ai's technology can be modified to turn a vehicle autonomous.

In May 2018, Drive.ai announced a pilot program in Frisco, Texas to test the company's vehicles in its first application of a passenger carrying service available to the general public.

In June 2019, just days before it was set to close, the company was acquired by Apple Inc., which was interested in the acquisition of an autonomous vehicle company to supplement its automotive Project Titan.

== History ==
Drive.ai was established in 2015 through Stanford University's Artificial Intelligence Lab by a group of masters and PhD students from Andrew Ng's research lab. The group initially worked to develop a retrofit kit to add their autonomous driving system to existing cars. In August 2016, the company emerged from stealth mode with $12 million in funding and became the 13th company in California to get a license to test autonomous vehicles on public roads. The company's early funding included investments by Northern Light Venture Capital, Oriza Ventures and InnoSpring Seed Fund.

In June 2017, Drive.ai raised a $50 million Series B funding round led by New Enterprise Associates with participation from GGV Capital, Northern Light Venture Capital and other previous investors. As part of the funding announcement, the company also announced that scientist Andrew Ng had joined its board of directors. In the same month, Lyft announced a partnership with Drive.ai to run a pilot program in San Francisco operating Drive.ai's test fleet through Lyft's platform.

Drive.ai raised an additional $15 million in September 2017 including participation from Grab, a ride-hailing technology company in Southeast Asia.

In May 2018, it was announced that Drive.ai was working with the Frisco Transportation Management Association and would be releasing an on-demand self-driving passenger carrying car service in Frisco, Texas during the course of an initial 6-month pilot program. It was the first public deployment of self-driving cars in Texas. The pilot program will initially use safety drivers to monitor the car's operation, but will eventually move to driverless operation with remote monitoring. A Drive.ai app will be used by riders to call rides. Initially, the program will operate as a shared service within a fixed area including retail, entertainment and office spaces using designated pickup and drop-off locations. During the trial period, Drive.ai offered public education about its self-driving technology.

In October 2018, Drive.ai announced that it would launch a similar self-driving passenger carrying car service in Arlington, Texas and became the first company with revenue in the self-driving car space. The service would include three vehicles running on several routes across different parts of the city, including the AT&T Stadium.

== Technology ==
The company has a fleet of Lincoln MKZs, an Audi A4 and Nissan NV200s for its testing in California.

In February 2017, Drive.ai released the first video footage of its technology, featuring one of its self-driving Lincoln MKZ cars navigating the streets of Mountain View, CA in the rain after dark. This marked an early recording of a self-driving vehicle operating on a fully autonomous ride at night, or in inclement weather.

In May 2018, Drive.ai released a video featuring an orange Nissan NV200 driverless vehicle navigating Frisco streets. The video featured private streets as well as busy intersections and a traffic circle. It also featured a display showing the car's sensors and cameras dealing with objects on the road and highlighted operation through low-angle sunlight that would obscure typical sensors. The car's object recognition systems identify and route around other vehicles, pedestrians and cyclists safely. Drive.ai's cars include screens on the outside of the car, one on the hood, one on the back, and one on each side, to communicate with pedestrians. The screens feature prompts such as "Passengers Entering/Exiting' or "Waiting for You to Cross."

Drive.ai collects data along the routes it will be using to create three-dimensional high-definition maps to support the self-driving technology.
