= Andrew Ng =

American artificial intelligence researcher

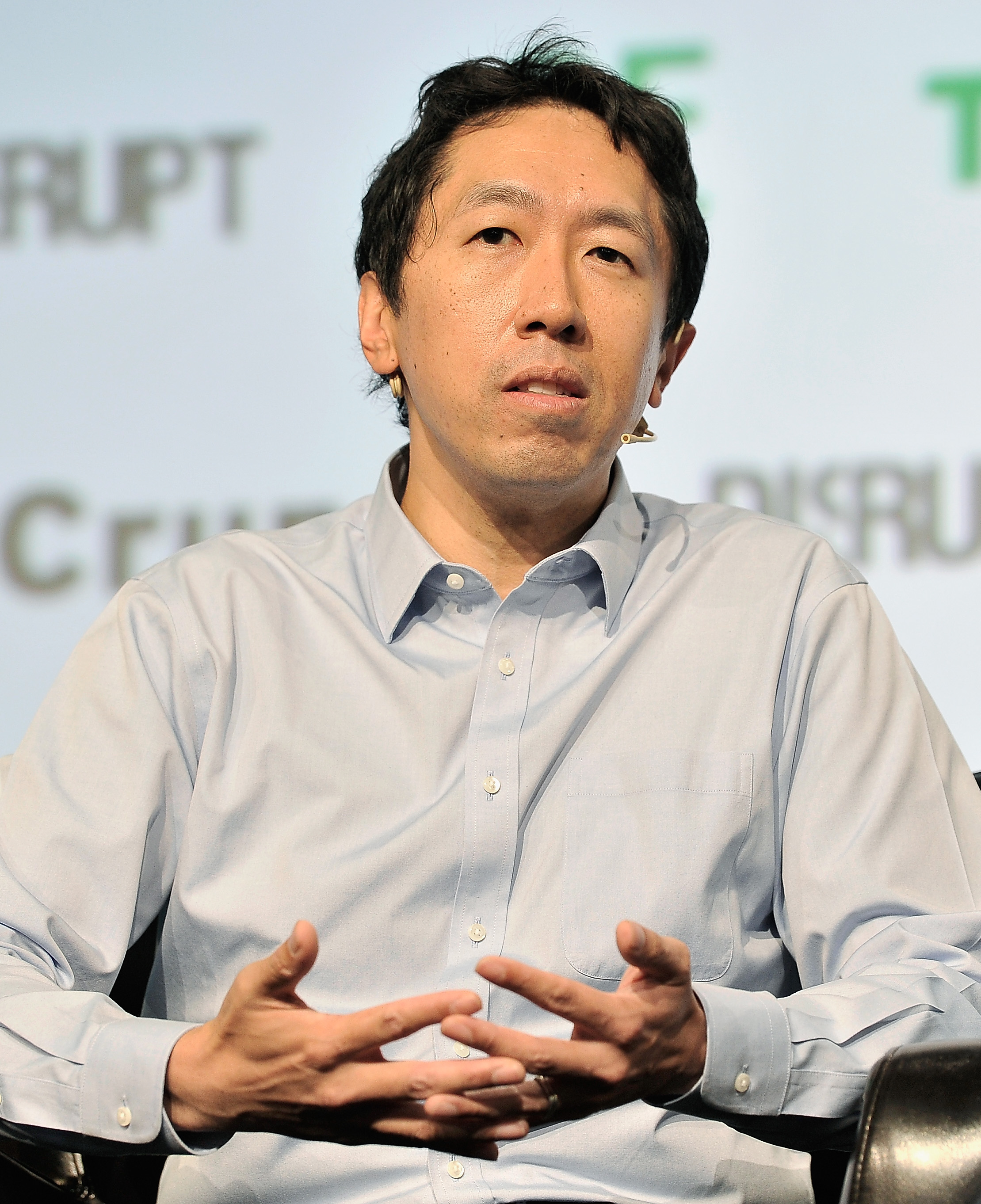
- Ng in 2017
- Born: Andrew Yan-Tak Ng; April 18, 1976 (age 50); London, England
- Education: Carnegie Mellon University (BS); Massachusetts Institute of Technology (MS); University of California, Berkeley (PhD)
- Known for: His work in artificial intelligence, deep learning, MOOC, and education technology
- Spouse: Carol E. Reiley (m. 2014)
- Children: 2
- Mother: Tisa Ho
- Awards: 2007 Sloan Fellowship; 2008 MIT Technology Review TR35; 2009 IJCAI Computers and Thought Award; 2013 Time 100 Most Influential People; 2013 Fortune's 40 under 40; 2013 CNN 10; 2014 Fast Company's Most Creative People in Business; 2015 World Economic Forum Young Global Leaders; 2023 Time 100 Most Influential People in AI
- Scientific career
- Fields: Computer science, artificial intelligence, machine learning, natural language processing, computer vision
- Workplaces: Stanford University; Google Brain; Coursera; Baidu
- Thesis: Shaping and policy search in Reinforcement learning (2003)
- Doctoral advisor: Michael I. Jordan
- Notable students: Ian Goodfellow; David Stavens; Pieter Abbeel; Quoc Viet Le; Ashutosh Saxena
- Website: andrewng.org

Andrew Ng
- Traditional Chinese: 吳恩達
- Simplified Chinese: 吴恩达
Transcriptions
Standard Mandarin
- Hanyu Pinyin: Wú Ēndá
Yue: Cantonese
- Jyutping: ng4 jan1 daat6

Andrew Yan-Tak Ng (Chinese: 吳恩達; born April 18, 1976) is a British-American computer scientist and technology entrepreneur focusing on machine learning and artificial intelligence (AI). Ng was a cofounder and head of Google Brain and was the former Chief Scientist at Baidu.

Ng is an adjunct professor at Stanford University (formerly associate professor and Director of its Stanford AI Lab or SAIL). Ng has also worked in online education, cofounding Coursera and DeepLearning.AI. He has spearheaded many efforts to "democratize deep learning" teaching over 8 million students through his online courses. Ng is renowned globally in computer science, recognized in Time magazine's 100 Most Influential People in 2012 and Fast Company's Most Creative People in 2014. His influence extends to being named in the Time100 AI Most Influential People in 2023.

In 2018, he launched and currently heads the AI Fund, initially a $175-million investment fund for backing artificial intelligence startups. He has founded LandingAI, which provides AI-powered SaaS products. On April 11, 2024, Amazon announced Ng's appointment to its board of directors.

== Early life and education ==
Andrew Yan-Tak Ng was born in London, in 1976 to Ronald Paul Ng, a hematologist and lecturer at UCL Medical School, and Tisa Ho, an arts administrator working at the London Film Festival. His parents were both immigrants from Hong Kong. His family moved back to Hong Kong and he spent his early childhood there. In 1984 he and his family moved to Singapore.

Ng attended and graduated from Raffles Institution.

In 1997, he earned his undergraduate degree with a triple major in computer science, statistics, and economics from Carnegie Mellon University in Pittsburgh, Pennsylvania. Between 1996 and 1998 he also conducted research on reinforcement learning, model selection, and feature selection at the AT&T Bell Labs.

In 1998, Ng earned his master's degree in Electrical Engineering and Computer Science from the Massachusetts Institute of Technology (MIT) in Cambridge, Massachusetts. At MIT, he built the first publicly available, automatically indexed web-search engine for research papers on the web. It was a precursor to CiteSeerX/ResearchIndex, but specialized in machine learning.

In 2002, he received his Doctor of Philosophy (Ph.D.) in Computer Science from the University of California, Berkeley, under the supervision of Michael I. Jordan. His thesis is titled "Shaping and policy search in reinforcement learning" and is well-cited to this day.

== Career ==
=== Academia and teaching ===
Ng started working as an assistant professor at Stanford University in 2002 and as an associate professor in 2009.

Ng is a professor at Stanford University departments of Computer Science and electrical engineering. He served as the director of the Stanford Artificial Intelligence Laboratory (SAIL), where he taught students and undertook research related to data mining, big data, and machine learning. His machine learning course CS229 at Stanford is the most popular course offered on campus with over 1,000 students enrolling some years. As of 2020, three of the most popular courses on Coursera are Ng's: Machine Learning (#1), AI for Everyone (#5), Neural Networks and Deep Learning (#6).

In 2008, his group at Stanford was one of the first in the US to start advocating the use of GPUs in deep learning. The rationale was that an efficient computation infrastructure could speed up statistical model training by orders of magnitude, ameliorating some of the scaling issues associated with big data. At the time it was a controversial and risky decision, but since then and following Ng's lead, GPUs have become a cornerstone in the field. Since 2017, Ng has been advocating the shift to high-performance computing (HPC) for scaling up deep learning and accelerating progress in the field.

In 2012, along with Stanford computer scientist Daphne Koller he cofounded and was CEO of Coursera, a website that offers free online courses to everyone. It took off with over 100,000 students registered for Ng's popular CS229A course. Today, several million people have enrolled in Coursera courses, making the site one of the leading massive open online courses (MOOCs) in the world.

=== Industry ===
From 2011 to 2012, he worked at Google, where he founded and directed the Google Brain Deep Learning Project with Jeff Dean, Greg Corrado, and Rajat Monga.

In 2014, he joined Baidu as chief scientist, and carried out research related to big data and AI. There he set up several research teams for things like facial recognition and Melody, an AI chatbot for healthcare. He also developed for the company the AI platform called DuerOS and other technologies that positioned Baidu ahead of Google in the discourse and development of AI. In March 2017, he announced his resignation from Baidu.

He soon afterward launched DeepLearning.AI, an online series of deep learning courses (including the AI for Good Specialization). Then Ng launched LandingAI, which provides AI-powered SaaS products.

In January 2018, Ng unveiled the AI Fund, raising $175 million to invest in new startups. In November 2021, LandingAI secured a $57 million round of series A funding led by McRock Capital, to help enterprises adopt AI.

In October 2024, Ng's AI Fund made its first investment in India, backing AI healthcare startup Jivi, which uses AI for diagnoses, treatment recommendations, and administrative tasks. The investment highlights the growth of India's AI sector, expected to reach $22 billion by 2027.

=== Research ===
Ng researches primarily in machine learning, deep learning, machine perception, computer vision, and natural language processing; and is highly regarded for his work in these fields. He has won best paper awards at academic conferences and has had a notable impact on the field of AI, computer vision, and robotics.

During graduate school, together with David M. Blei and Michael I. Jordan, Ng co-authored the influential paper that introduced latent Dirichlet allocation (LDA) for his thesis on reinforcement learning for drones.

His early work includes the Stanford Autonomous Helicopter project, which developed one of the most capable autonomous helicopters in the world. He was the leading scientist and principal investigator on the STAIR (Stanford Artificial Intelligence Robot) project, which resulted in Robot Operating System (ROS), a widely used open source software robotics platform. His vision to build an AI robot and put a robot in every home inspired Scott Hassan to back him and create Willow Garage. He is also one of the founding team members for the Stanford WordNet project, which uses machine learning to expand the Princeton WordNet database created by Christiane Fellbaum.

In 2011, Ng founded the Google Brain project at Google, which developed large-scale artificial neural networks using Google's distributed computing infrastructure. Among its notable results was a neural network trained using deep learning algorithms on 16,000 CPU cores, which learned to recognize cats after watching only YouTube videos, and without ever having been told what a "cat" is. The project's technology is also currently used in the Android operating system's speech recognition system.

=== Views on AI ===
Ng thinks that the real threat is contemplating the future of work: "Rather than being distracted by evil killer robots, the challenge to labor caused by these machines is a conversation that academia and industry and government should have." He has emphasized the importance of expanding access to AI education, stating that empowering people around the world to use AI tools is essential to building AI applications.

In a December 2023 Financial Times interview, Ng highlighted concerns regarding the impact of potential regulations on open-source AI, emphasizing how reporting, licensing, and liability risks could unfairly burden smaller firms and stifle innovation. He argued that regulating basic technologies like open-source models could hinder progress without markedly enhancing safety. Ng advocated for carefully designed regulations to prevent obstacles to the development and distribution of beneficial AI technologies.

In a June 2024 interview with the Financial Times, Ng expressed concerns about proposed AI legislation in California that would have required developers to implement safety mechanisms such as a "kill switch" for advanced models. He described the bill as creating "massive liabilities for science-fiction risks" and said it "stokes fear in anyone daring to innovate." Other critics argued the bill would impose burdens on open-source developers and smaller AI companies. The bill was ultimately vetoed by Governor Gavin Newsom in September 2024.

== Online education: massive open online course ==
External audio
- Interview with Coursera Co-Founder Andrew Ng, Degree of Freedom

In 2011, Stanford launched a total of three massive open online course (MOOCs) on machine learning (CS229a), databases, and AI, taught by Ng, Peter Norvig, Sebastian Thrun, and Jennifer Widom. This has led to the modern MOOC movement. Ng taught machine learning and Widom taught databases. The course on AI taught by Thrun led to the genesis of Udacity.

The seeds of massive open online courses (MOOCs) go back a few years before the founding of Coursera in 2012. Two themes emphasized in the founding of modern MOOCs were scale and availability.

By 2023, Ng has notably expanded access to AI education, with an estimated 8 million individuals worldwide taking his courses via platforms like DeepLearning.AI and Coursera.

=== Founding of Coursera ===
Ng started the Stanford Engineering Everywhere (SEE) program, which in 2008 published a number of Stanford courses online for free. Ng taught one of these courses, "Machine Learning", which includes his video lectures, along with the student materials used in the Stanford CS229 class. It offered a similar experience to MIT OpenCourseWare, except it aimed at providing a more "complete course" experience, equipped with lectures, course materials, problems and solutions, etc. The SEE videos were viewed by the millions and inspired Ng to develop and iterate new versions of online tech.

Within Stanford, they include Daphne Koller with her "blended learning experiences" and codesigning a peer-grading system, John Mitchell (Courseware, a Learning Management System), Dan Boneh (using machine learning to sync videos, later teaching cryptography on Coursera), Bernd Girod (ClassX), and others. Outside Stanford, Ng and Thrun credit Sal Khan of Khan Academy as a huge source of inspiration. Ng was also inspired by lynda.com and the design of the forums of Stack Overflow.

Widom, Ng, and others were ardent advocates of Khan-styled tablet recordings, and between 2009 and 2011, several hundred hours of lecture videos recorded by Stanford instructors were recorded and uploaded. Ng tested some of the original designs with a local high school to figure the best practices for recording lessons.

In October 2011, the "applied" version of the Stanford class (CS229a) was hosted on ml-class.org and launched, with over 100,000 students registered for its first edition. The course featured quizzes and graded programming assignments and became one of the first and most successful massive open online courses (MOOCs) created by a Stanford professor.

Two other courses on databases (db-class.org) and AI (ai-class.org) were launched. The ml-class and db-class ran on a platform developed by students, including Frank Chen, Jiquan Ngiam, Chuan-Yu Foo, and Yifan Mai. Word spread through social media and popular press. The three courses were 10 weeks long, and over 40,000 "Statements of Accomplishment" were awarded.

His work subsequently led to his founding of Coursera with Koller in 2012. As of 2019, the two most popular courses on the platform were taught and designed by Ng: "Machine Learning" (#1) and "Neural Networks and Deep Learning" (#2).

=== Post-Coursera work ===
In 2019, Ng launched a new course "AI for Everyone". This is a non-technical course designed to help people understand AI's impact on society and its benefits and costs for companies, as well as how they can navigate through this technological revolution.

== Venture capital ==
Ng is the chair of the board for Woebot Labs, a psychological clinic that uses data science to provide cognitive behavioral therapy. It provides a therapy chatbot to help treat depression, among other things.

He is also a member of the board of directors for drive.ai, which uses AI for self-driving cars and was acquired by Apple in 2019.

Through LandingAI, he also focuses on democratizing AI technology and lowering the barrier for entrance to businesses and developers.

== Awards ==
- 1995. Bell Atlantic Network Services Scholarship
- 1995, 1996. Microsoft Technical Scholarship Award
- 1996. Andrew Carnegie Society Scholarship
- 1998–2000: Berkeley Fellowship
- 2001–2002: Microsoft Research Fellowship
- 2007. Alfred P. Sloan Research Fellowship Sloan Foundation Faculty Fellowship
- 2008. Massachusetts Institute of Technology (MIT) Technology Review, 35 Innovators Under 35 (TR35)
- 2009. IJCAI Computers and Thought Award (the highest award in AI given to a researcher under 35)
- 2009. Vance D. & Arlene C. Coffman Faculty Scholar Award
- 2013. Time 100 Most Influential People
- 2013. Fortune's 40 under 40
- 2013. CNN 10: Thinkers
- 2014. Fast Company's Most Creative People in Business
- 2015. World Economic Forum Young Global Leaders
- 2023. Time AI 100 Most Influential People
- 2024 Honorary Fellowship of the Royal Statistical Society.

== Personal life ==
Ng currently lives in Los Altos Hills, California. In 2014, he married Carol E. Reiley. They have two children: a daughter born in 2019 and a son born in 2021. The MIT Technology Review named Ng and Reiley an "AI power couple". As of 2024, his wife filed for a divorce.

== Publications ==
Ng is the author or co-author of over 300 publications in robotics, and related fields. His work in computer vision and deep learning has been featured often in press releases and reviews.

He has co-refereed hundreds of AI publications in journals like NeurIPS. He has also been the editor of the Journal of Artificial Intelligence Research (JAIR), Associate Editor for the IEEE Robotics and Automation Society Conference Editorial Board (ICRA), and much more.

He has given invited talks at NASA, Google, Microsoft, Lockheed Martin, the Max Planck Society, Stanford, Princeton, UPenn, Cornell, MIT, UC Berkeley, and dozens of other universities. Outside of the US, he has lectured in Spain, Germany, Israel, China, Korea, and Canada.

He has also written for Harvard Business Review, HuffPost, Slate, Apple News, and Quora Sessions' Twitter. He also writes a weekly digital newsletter called The Batch.

- On Feature Selection: learning with exponentially many irreverent features as training examples. MIT Open Scholarship (Thesis). 1998. hdl:1721.1/9658.
- Ng, Andrew Y.; Zheng, Alice X.; Jordan, Michael I. (2001). Link Analysis, Eigenvectors and Stability. International Joint Conferences on Artificial Intelligence. p. 903–909. ISSN 1045-0823. OCLC 807468217.
- Machine Learning Yearning (PDF). 2018.
- "AI TransformationPlaybook". December 2018. Archived from the original (PDF) on December 14, 2018.
- Ford, Martin (2018). "Andrew Ng". Architects of Intelligence: The Truth About AI from the People Building it. Birmingham, UK: Packt Publishing. pp. 185–205. ISBN 978-1-78913-126-0. OCLC 1083340727.

== See also ==
- Coursera
- Google Brain
- Latent Dirichlet allocation
- Robot Operating System
