= Tisza (disambiguation) =

The Tisza is a river in Central Europe.

Tisza may also refer to:

- István Tisza (1861–1918), Hungarian prime minister, during World War I
- Kálmán Tisza (1830–1902), Hungarian prime minister
- Kata Tisza (born 1980), Hungarian writer
- Lajos Tisza (1832–1898), Hungarian politician
- Laszlo Tisza (1907–2009), Hungarian physicist and philosopher of science
- Tisza Cipő, a Hungarian sports shoe brand
- Tisza culture an archaeological culture from Hungary
- the Respect and Freedom Party, commonly referred to as the Tisza Party, a Hungarian political party affiliated with Péter Magyar

== See also ==
- Tisa (disambiguation)
- Tiso (surname)
