= Coursera =

Online education technology company

Coursera Inc.

- Screenshot Coursera's homepage in March 2020
- Company type: Public
- Website type: Online education
- Available in: Multilingual (40)
- Traded as: NYSE: COUR
- Headquarters: Mountain View, California, U.S.
- Area served: Worldwide
- Founders: Andrew Ng; Daphne Koller
- Key people: Andrew Ng (chairman)
- Industry: E-learning
- Revenue: ▲US$694.7 million (2024)
- Operating income: ▲US$−114 million (2024)
- Net income: ▲US$−79 million (2024)
- Total assets: ▼US$930 million (2024)
- Total equity: ▼US$597 million (2024)
- Employees: 1,300 (2024)
- Subsidiaries: Udemy
- Website: coursera.org
- Commercial: Yes
- Registration: Required
- Users: 168 million (2024)
- Launched: April 2012; 14 years ago
- Current status: Active

Coursera Inc. (/kɔːrˈsɛərə/) is an American online learning platform, originally known for offering massive open online courses (MOOCs). It was founded in 2012 by Stanford University computer science professors Andrew Ng and Daphne Koller. Coursera works with universities and other organizations to offer online courses, certifications and degrees in a variety of subjects.

== History ==
Coursera was founded in 2012 by Stanford University computer science professors Andrew Ng and Daphne Koller. Ng and Koller started offering their Stanford courses online in fall 2011, and soon after left Stanford to launch Coursera. Princeton, Stanford, the University of Michigan, and the University of Pennsylvania were the first universities to offer content on the platform.

In 2014 Coursera received both the Webby Winner (Websites and Mobile Sites Education 2014) and the People's Voice Winner (Websites and Mobile Sites Education) awards.

In March 2021, Coursera filed for an initial public offering. The nine-year-old company brought in roughly $293 million in revenue for the fiscal year ended December 31 — a 59% growth rate from 2019, according to the filing. Net losses widened by roughly $20 million yearly, reaching $66.8 million in 2020. Coursera spent $107 million on marketing in 2020.

In December 2025, Coursera agreed to acquire Udemy for about $930 million in equity, valuing the combined company at $2.5 billion.

== Operations ==
The startup raised an initial $16 million funding round backed by Kleiner Perkins Caufield & Byers and New Enterprise Associates. In 2013, GSV led the Series B investment, which totaled $63 million. In 2015, NEA led the Series C round of venture funding, which totaled more than $60 million. In 2017, the company raised $64 million from its existing investors in a Series D round of funding. In 2019, the company raised $103 million in Series E round of funding from the SEEK Group, Future Fund and NEA. The company reached valuation of $1 billion+ in 2019. In July 2020, the company announced it had raised $130 million in Series F funding and updated its valuation to $2.5 billion.

Coursera priced its initial public offering (IPO) at $33 per share in New York on March 31, 2021, valuing the company at approximately $4.30 billion. The IPO aimed to raise about $519 million. Coursera's revenue rose by 59% to $293.5 million in 2020. The IPO included around 14.7 million shares of common stock, with approximately 1.1 million shares offered by selling shareholders.

=== Finances ===
Coursera's revenues rose from $184 million in 2019 to $294 million in 2020. The company lost $66 million in 2020 as it ramped up marketing and advertising.

For the first quarter of 2021, Coursera reported revenue of $88.4 million, up 64% from a year earlier, with a net loss of $18.7 million, or $13.4 million on a non-GAAP basis. Coursera said consumer revenue was $51.9 million, up 61%, while enterprise revenue was $24.5 million, up 63%, and degree programs had revenue of $12 million, up 81%.

For the third quarter of 2021, Coursera reported revenue of $109.9 million, up 33% from $82.7 million the previous year. Gross profit was $67.7 million or 61.6% of revenue. Net loss was $(32.5) million or (29.5)% of revenue.

To date, Coursera has never made a profit.

=== Business model ===
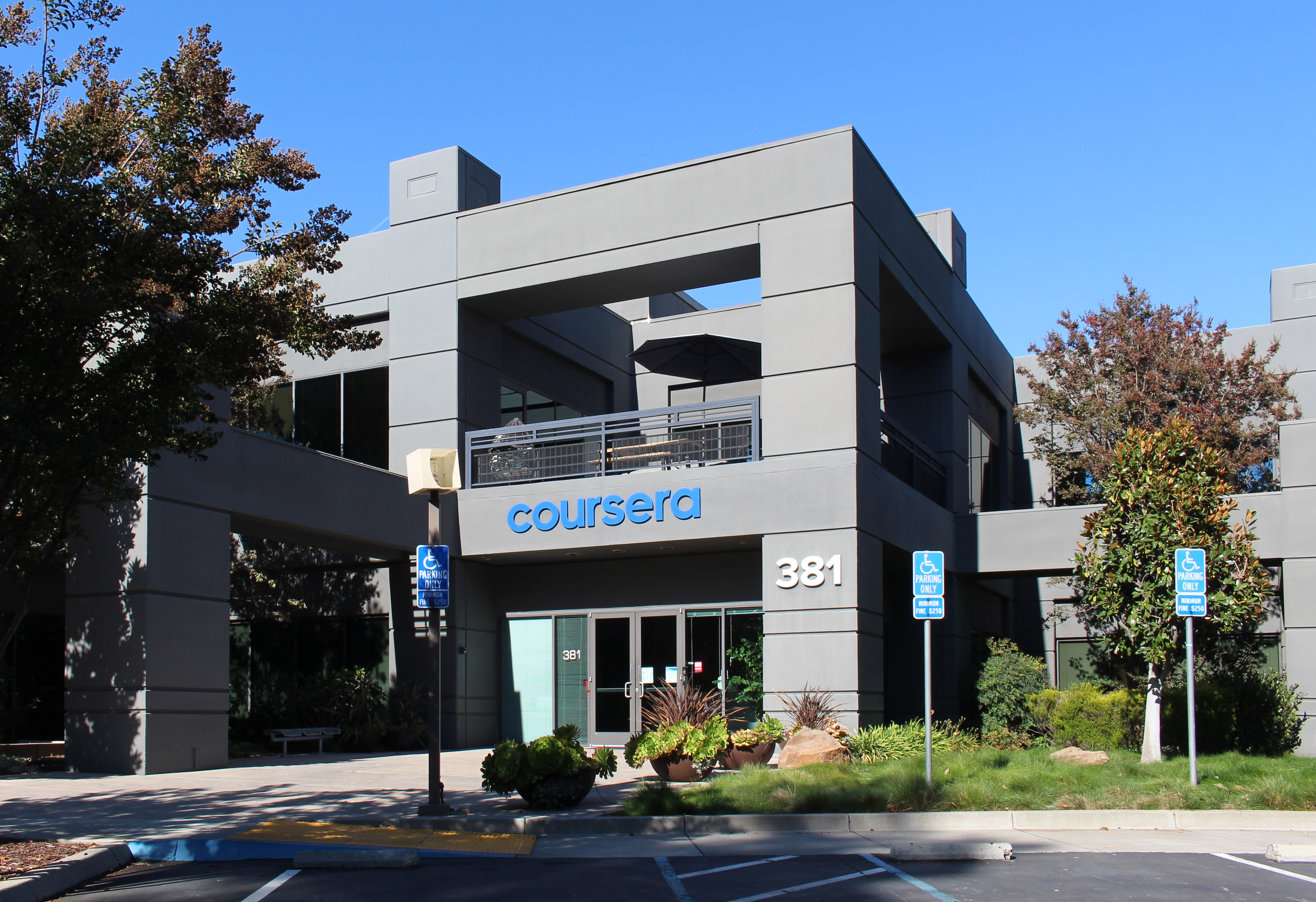
Former Coursera headquarters in Mountain View.

In September 2013, it announced it had earned $1 million in revenue through the sale of verified certificates that authenticate successful course completion. Coursera first rolled out a series of fee-based course options, which included verified credentials for completion, in 2013. As of October 2015, the company had raised a total of $146.1 million in venture capital.

In January 2016, Coursera rolled out fees to earn grades and assessments for "the vast majority of courses that are part of Specializations". The company offers financial aid to people who demonstrate a need. In July 2016, the company launched an enterprise product called Coursera for Business. TechCrunch notes that the company "opened itself to additional revenues from the lucrative corporate e-learning market, which some reports suggest was worth $12 billion in the US alone". Coursera for Business customers include L'Oréal, Boston Consulting Group, and Axis Bank. In October 2016, Coursera launched a monthly subscription model for Specializations and a 1-week free trial. The company has said subscription costs will vary "depending on the topic area".

In January 2017, the company launched Coursera for Governments & Nonprofits. Coursera has announced partnerships with the Institute for Veterans & Military Families (IVMF) in the United States and entities in Egypt, Mongolia, Singapore, Malaysia, Pakistan, and Kazakhstan. In June 2017, Jeff Maggioncalda became the CEO of Coursera.

In 2020, reports indicated that Coursera operates on a mixed model, with fewer than 10% of students choosing to pay for courses, whereas the vast majority preferred the free options available. Around 60% of students in degree programs initially explore free courses. Coursera's CEO describes the platform as a "managed marketplace," akin to Apple's app store, where the company curates courses, sets format standards, and establishes pricing guidelines. Revenue sharing varies, with universities receiving 60% of revenue from degree courses, and an even split for certificate courses in technology and business.

On February 2, 2021, Coursera announced its B Corporation certification from B Lab, and its transformation into a Public Benefit Corporation.

In December 2024, Jeff Maggioncalda left the company and was replaced by Greg Hart, a former Amazon executive, as CEO.

==== Course auditing paywall ====
Whilst Coursera used to offer a majority of courses which could be audited for free, promoting free access to education for everyone, a change of direction in 2024 led to an increased focus on short term profit, putting the entirety of the previously free course under a paywall ranging from US$49 to US$79.

Before this change, the free courses (also called "auditing a course") did not include a certificate of completion or grades or any other instructor feedback. A free course could be "upgraded" to the paid version, which included instructor's feedback and grades for the submitted assignments, and (if the student got a passing grade) a certificate of completion. This model still maintained respect for the teachers who chose to give rights to their content to Coursera as much as Coursera's main engagement which was to promote free access to quality learning for everyone. The new model however does not offer free education anymore. All of Coursera's courses are under a US$49 to US$79 paywall to get a time-limited access of a single month, with, for most of them, the opportunity to get a preview, which gives free access to only the first module. One way to get free courses on Coursera remains through applying on the website for financial aid. This new model also offers monthly and annual subscriptions for the price of US$59 and US$399 respectively. Before this change, Coursera had a stable model with revenues growing from $60 million to almost $700 million annually between 2017 and 2024 under previous CEO Jeff Maggioncalda.

=== Leadership ===
Coursera's board of directors include co-founder and chairman Andrew Ng, Theodore R. Mitchell, president of the American Council on Education, and Scott Sandell, executive chairman of New Enterprise Associates.

== Product and services ==
=== Courses ===
Coursera courses last approximately four to twelve weeks, with one to two hours of video lectures a week. These courses provide quizzes, weekly exercises, peer-graded and reviewed assignments, an optional Honors assignment, and sometimes a final project or exam to complete the course.

As of December 2019, the total number of partners with Coursera is more than 200 across 29 countries. Coursera mainly works with universities and colleges, but also with corporations and governments. University partners include University of São Paulo in Brazil, University of London in the UK, Indian School of Business of India, Yonsei University in South Korea, Ajman University in United Arab Emirates, and institutions like Yale, University of Illinois and University of Pennsylvania. Google launched Professional certification program. Google will consider all of its certificates as the equivalent of a four-year college degree.

In 2020, in response to the COVID-19 pandemic, Coursera launched a course by the Jameel Institute at Imperial College London. Called "Science Matters: Let's Talk About COVID-19", the course was the most popular launched on Coursera in 2020, with over 130,000 enrolled learners that year.

As of 2024, the number of courses available was approximately 7,000.

=== Degrees ===
In March 2018, Coursera launched six fully online degree courses, including bachelor's and master's qualifications in various domains.

=== Professional certificate ===
Google, IBM, Meta and other well-known companies, launched various courses for professional certificates, allowing students to fill the workforce in various sectors, such as data analytics, IT support, digital marketing, UX design, project management, and data science. According to Google, their courses are equivalent to 4 year degrees. Such courses include courses on Generative AI, Data analytics, IT Support, Digital Marketing & E-commerce, Cybersecurity, and more. Google has a total of 1,172 courses on Coursera. They also offered 100,000 scholarships. Google and its 20+ partners will accept those certificates as 4-year degree equivalent.

== See also ==
- List of online educational resources
