= Jeff Maggioncalda =

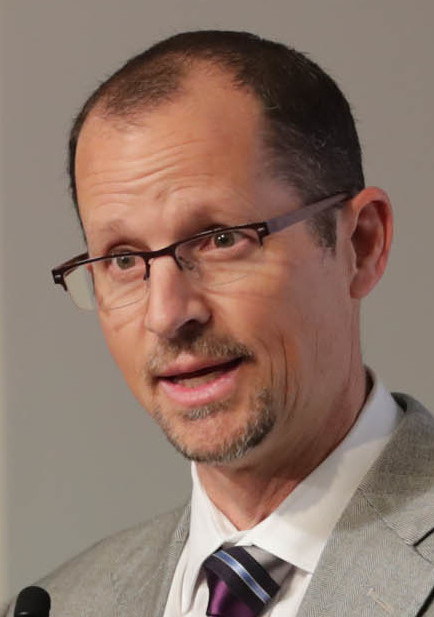
Jeffrey Maggioncalda in 2017

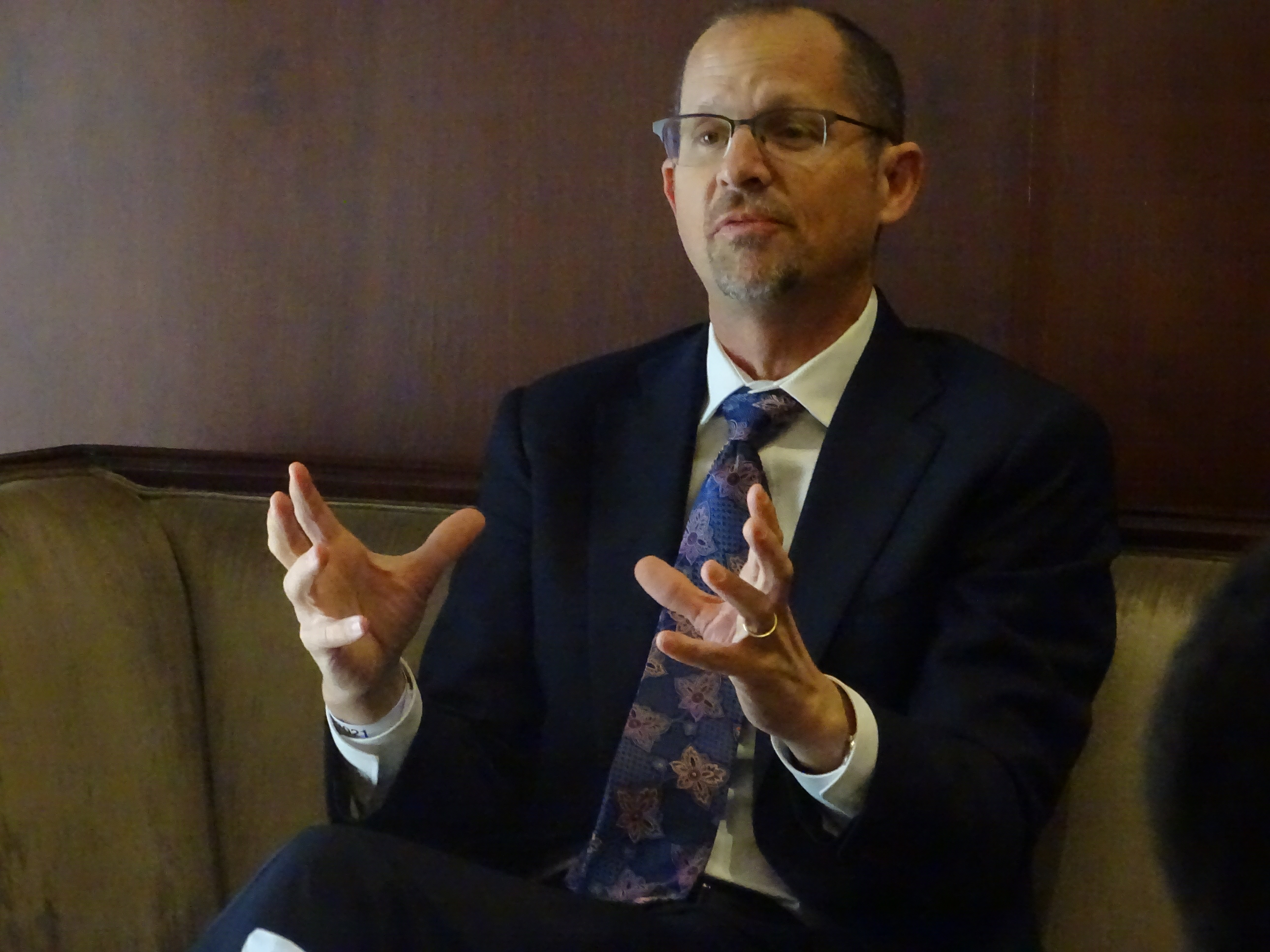
Jeffrey Maggioncalda conversing at a conference hosted in Egypt

Jeff Maggioncalda is an American business executive and was the chief executive officer of Coursera until January 29th, 2025. Whilst simultaneously working at the SVB Financial Group as a Board of Directors Member throughout 2011 to November 2024. Born in 1968, Maggioncalda grew up in Pacifica, California and went to St Ignatius College Prep in San Francisco and graduated from Stanford University in 1991 with a BA degree in English and Economics. Maggioncalda begun his career with Cornerstone Research before heading to Stanford for his Masters in Business Administration in 1996. He then worked at Financial Engines as founding CEO for 18 years, and was instrumental in the company going public in 2010 as the largest independent investment advisor in America. He was then recruited in 2017 to replace Rick Levin as CEO of Coursera. He is widely known to be an influential individual in the Ed-tech sector.

Maggioncalda took time off after 18 years as CEO of Financial Engines to travel, learn, and spend time with his family. He studied music theory and the piano, worked as a consultant for SafeSpace adolescent mental health programmes, coached businesses, ascended Mount. Kilimanjaro with his middle daughter, and travelled the world with his wife. Jeff is currently a member of the Silicon Valley Bank Board of Directors.
