= Ashutosh Saxena =

Indian-American computer scientist

- Education: Stanford University, Indian Institute of Technology Kanpur
- Occupations: CEO, TorqueAGI
- Awards: San Francisco Business Times 40 under 40; Test of Time award by Robotics Science and Systems; MIT Technology Review TR35, 2018; Sloan Fellowship, 2011; World Technology Award, 2015; Google Faculty Research award, 2012; National Science Foundation Faculty Career (NSF-CAREER), 2014
- Scientific career
- Fields: Artificial intelligence (machine learning)
- Workplaces: Founder and CEO of TorqueAGI
- Thesis: (2009)
- Doctoral advisor: Andrew Ng
- Website: Stanford University — Ashutosh Saxena

Ashutosh Saxena is an Indian-American computer scientist, researcher, and entrepreneur known for his contributions to the field of artificial intelligence and large-scale robot learning. His interests include building enterprise AI agents and embodied AI. He is the founder and CEO of TorqueAGI, a company developing foundation models (physical AI) for robots. Saxena co-founded and was CEO of Caspar.AI, where generative AI parses data from ambient 3D radar sensors to predict 20+ health & wellness markers for pro-active patient care. Prior to Caspar.AI, Ashutosh co-founded Cognical Katapult (NASDAQ: KPLT), which provides a no credit required alternative to traditional financing for online and omni-channel retail. Before Katapult, Saxena was an assistant professor in the Computer Science Department and faculty director of the RoboBrain Project (a large-scale AI model for robotics) at Cornell University.

== Education ==
In 2009, with artificial intelligence pioneer Andrew Ng as his advisor, Saxena received both his M.S. and Ph.D. in computer science with an emphasis on artificial intelligence from Stanford University. His doctoral work developed machine-learning algorithms to estimate three-dimensional depth from a single still image, as well as end-to-end learning methods. Saxena received his B.Tech degree in electrical engineering from the Indian Institute of Technology (IIT), Kanpur in 2004.

== Career ==
Saxena was the chief scientist of New York-based Holopad, where he worked with Steven Spielberg's team to create walkthroughs and 3D experiences for his movie TinTin. His past experiences include building acoustic AI models at Bose Corporation. Once Ashutosh completed his undergraduate degree, he became a researcher at the Commonwealth Scientific and Industrial Research Organization (CSIRO), where he developed AI models for medical devices.

Before Caspar, Saxena pursued other entrepreneurial ventures, such as ZunaVision, an artificial intelligence startup he co-founded with Andrew Ng that uses AI to embed advertising space within videos. Ashutosh was the CTO of ZunaVision from 2008 to 2010. After ZunaVision, Saxena co-founded Cognical Katapult in 2012, which provided lease-to-own financing solutions to nonprime and underbanked consumers powered by artificial intelligence. In 2012, Saxena returned to Stanford as an adjunct professor. From 2014 to 2016, Saxena was the faculty director of the RoboBrain project, which was a joint venture that he started between Stanford University, Cornell University, Brown University, and the University of California, Berkeley that made a knowledge engine for robots. The engine learned from internet sources such as Wikipedia, WikiHow, and YouTube.

Saxena co-founded Brain of Things in 2015 with David Cheriton, who is chief scientist, and served as its CEO and chief AI officer. It was listed as the fastest growing private company reaching an annual recurring revenue of $8 million in three years. It has been widely covered in several outlets including Forbes Japan, and MIT Technology Review.

In 2021, Saxena co-founded Caspar.AI, as CEO and later executive chairman. The company applies AI to data from contactless 3D radar sensors to monitor health indicators in care facilities, and won the American Society on Aging Innovation Challenge in 2024. In January 2025, Saxena founded TorqueAGI, where he is CEO. Since 2025, Saxena has also been on the board of advisors of the robotics company GreyOrange, and is an advisor to early-stage AI companies, including Moores Lab AI and Basys AI.

Saxena's work on deep learning won the Test of Time (10-year) award in 2023 by Robotics Science and Systems. He also received the Robotics: Science and Systems Career Award in 2014, the Blue Sky Ideas Award, and multiple best paper awards at venues like CVPR, RSS, IROS, and ICRA. Ashutosh has been recognized for his work by receiving the Alfred P. Sloan Fellow in 2011, Google Faculty Research Award in 2012, Microsoft Faculty Fellowship in 2012, NSF Career award in 2013, One of the Eight Innovators to Watch by the Smithsonian Institution in 2015, and received TR35 Innovator Award by MIT Technology Review in 2018. He was named by San Francisco Business Times as a 40 under 40 young business leader.

== Research ==
Saxena has authored over 100 published papers in the areas of large-scale robot learning and artificial intelligence, with 20,000+ citations, appearing at venues such as NeurIPS, ICML, and CVPR. His work in the fields of computer vision and deep learning have been featured in press releases and academic journal reviews.

Ashutosh's early work includes the Stanford Artificial Intelligence Robot (STAIR), an AI model that enabled it to perform tasks such as unload items from a dishwasher, which was covered on the front-page of New York Times. His work on Make3D, was the first work that estimated 3D depth from a single still image. At Cornell University, Ashutosh led the Robot Learning Lab, which focused on bringing perception and planning together in a single model and used a machine learning approach to train robots to perform tasks in human environments such as generalizing manipulation in 3D point-clouds where robots learn to transfer manipulation trajectories to novel objects utilizing a large sample of demonstrations from crowdsourcing.
