= Tisá Rocks =

Group of rocks in Ústí nad Labem Region, Czech Republic

Coordinates: 50°47′16″N 14°1′44″E

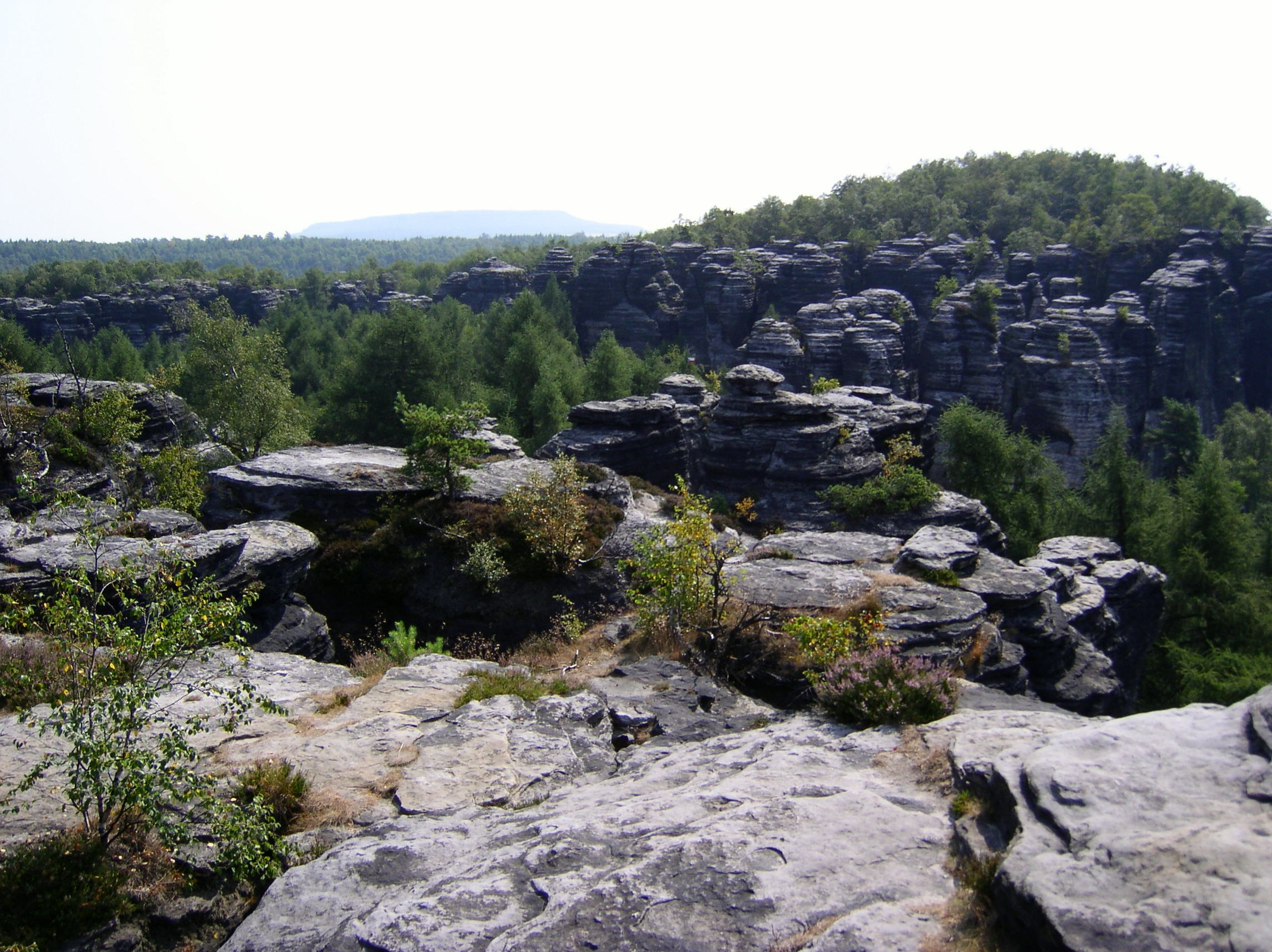
View of the Great Tisá Rocks

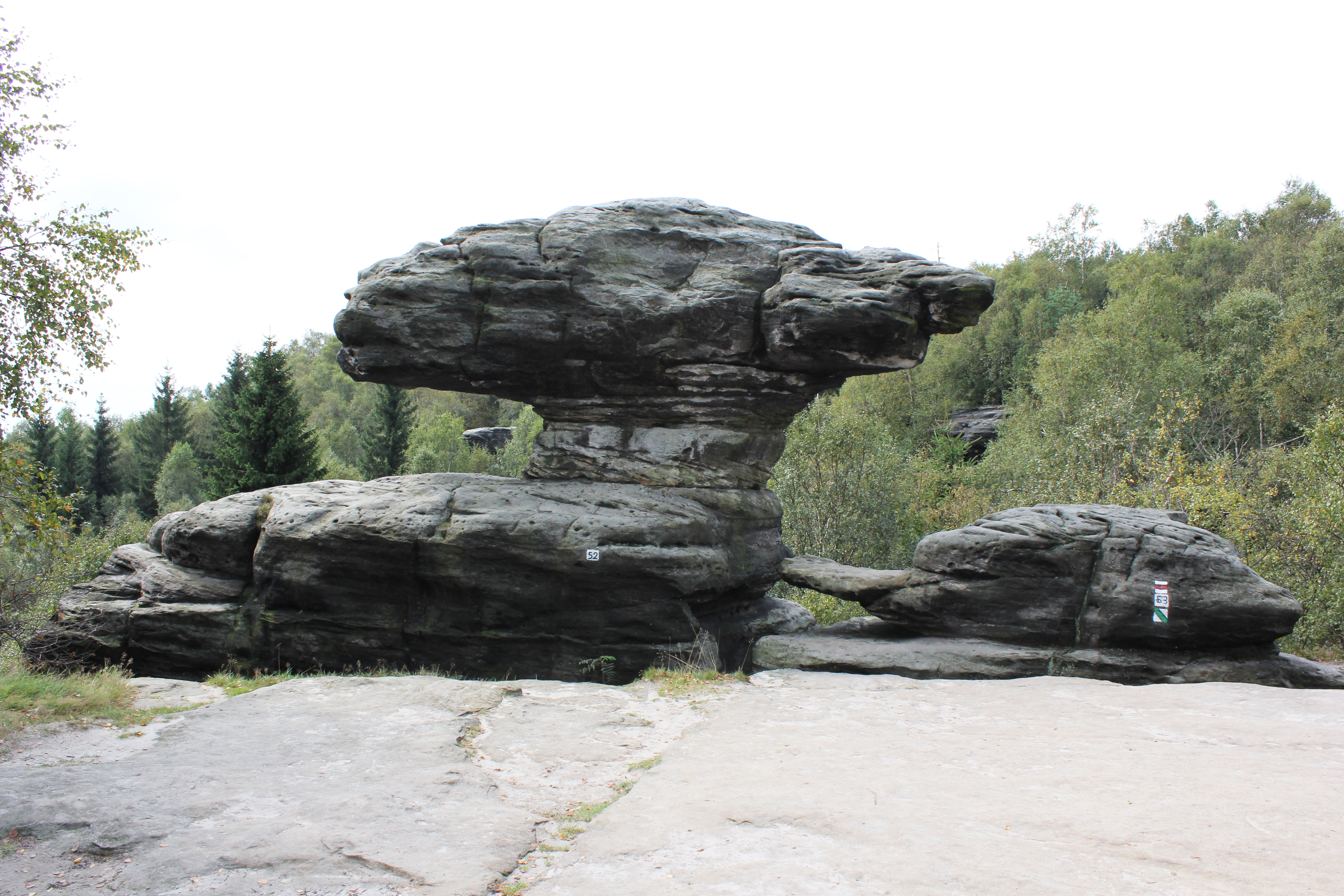
The landmark of Tisá Rocks: "Toadstool & Turtle"

The Tisá Rocks or Tisá Walls (Czech: Tiské stěny; German: Tyssaer Wände) are a group of rocks in Tisá in the Czech Republic. It is located in the western Elbe Sandstone Mountains, not far from its topographical boundary with the Ore Mountains. The region, with its rock pillars up to 30 m high, is one of the major tourist attractions of the region. The Tisá Rocks and the neighbouring Bürschlické Rocks are protected as a nature monument.

== Topography and geology ==
The Tisá Rocks are located at a height of about 600 m above sea level. They form a line of rock outcrops drawn up in an arc on the westernmost edge of the sandstone beds of the Elbe Sandstone Mountains from the Ore Mountain escarpment on Czech soil. About a kilometre west of them on the outskirts of Tisá stands the coarse- and medium-grained muscovite-biotite-orthogneiss of the Eastern Ore Mountain region. This also strikes eastwards on the hillside south of the village.

The rocks are frequently vertically dissected; in many places the fissures being as deep as the rock pillars are high. Horizontal weathering is found in the upper layers and have created several bizarre shapes, such as the rock called the Steinpilz ("boletus edulis" - a type of edible mushroom) which is easily accessible.

The "Great Tisá Rocks" begin near the official entrance by a restaurant. These consist of a northern and southern array of crags along an otherwise compact plateau. The crags to the west running off at an angle to the northwest are known as the "Little Tisá Rocks". They are more heavily dissected.

The crags of the Tisá Rocks comprise mainly of medium-grained sandstone of the Lower to Middle Turonian of the Cretaceous. They belong lithostratigraphically to the Weissenberg Formation (Bělohorské souvrství) in the Bohemian Cretaceous System. The nearby area surrounding the Tisá Rocks to the north and south is covered by diluvial sediments of loam, sand and boulder-containing scree.

In the sandstone are heavy concentrations of ferrous minerals on closely spaced strata, that can be identified from their yellow to red stripes of colour and predominantly horizontal. A striking feature in many places where the lower strata are visible are small and large cavities as well as occasional tunnels with an oval cross-section, whose walls are often covered with calcareous sinter deposits. These are relics of very old solution processes in the sandstone.

In zones of strong weathering, the marked stratification over short distances is clearly visible. Features associated with cross-bedding occur relatively frequently.

== Gallery ==
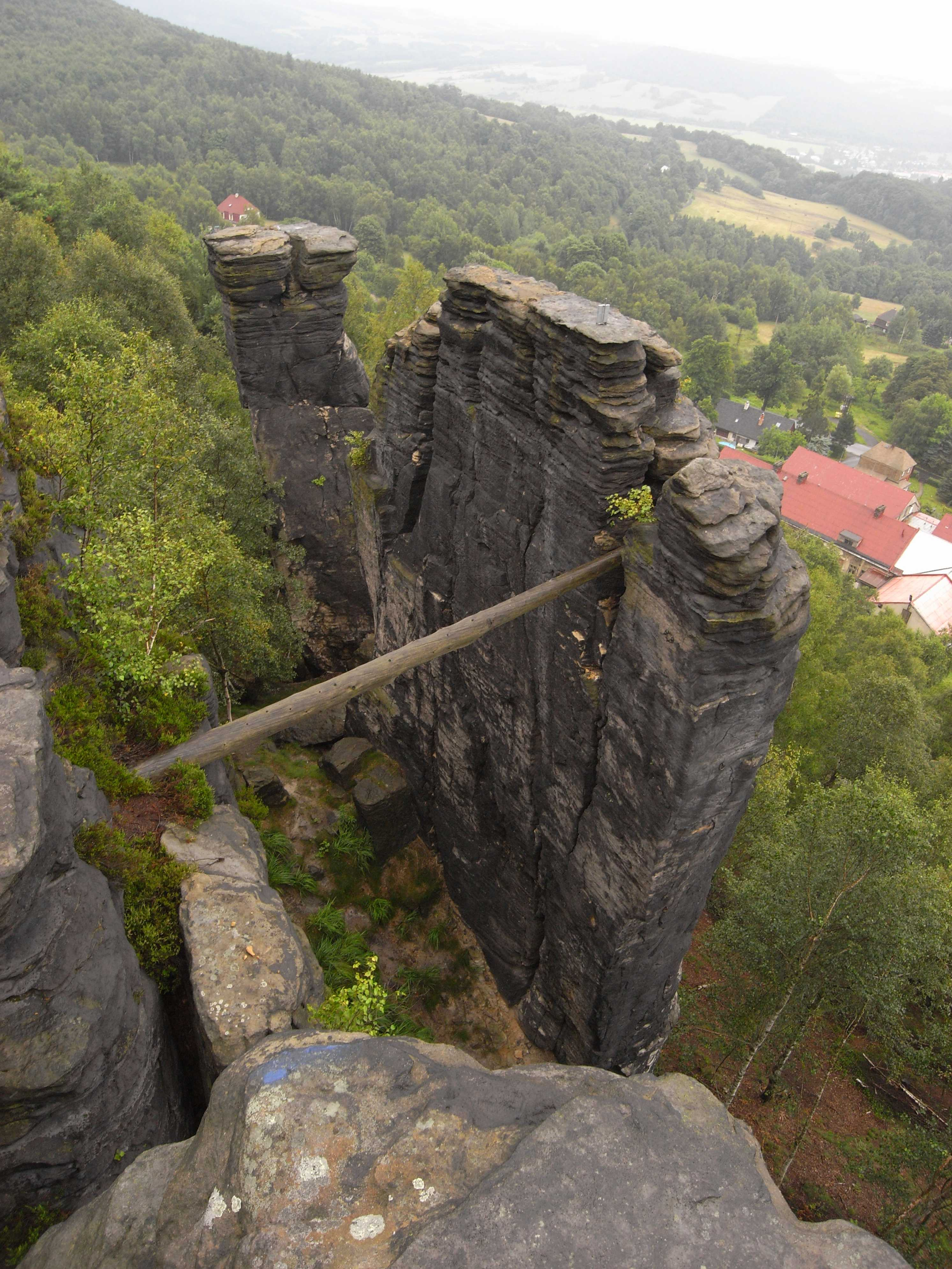
South flank of the Tisá Rocks falling steeply into the Most Basin

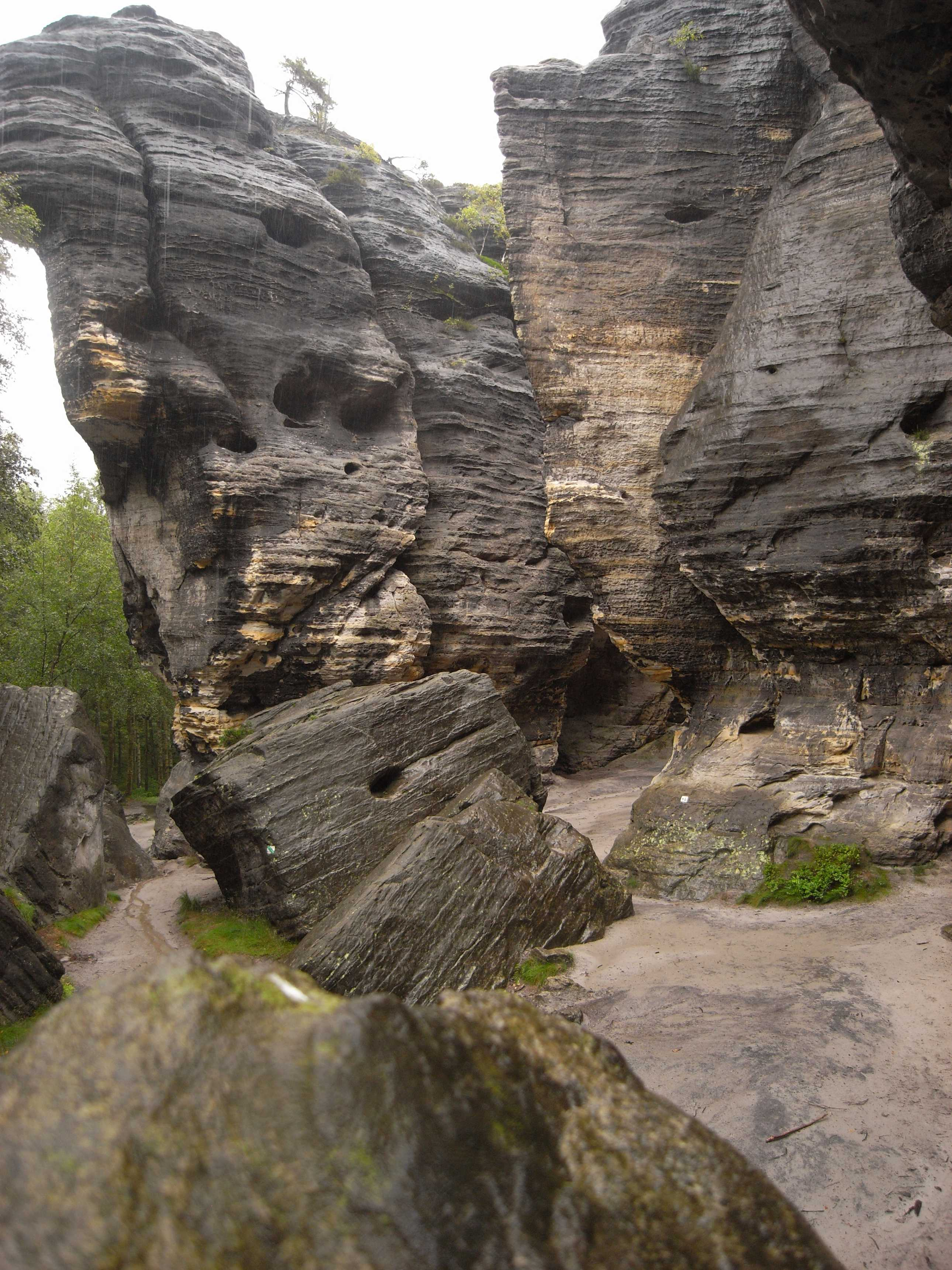
Fallen boulders in the Great Tisá Rocks

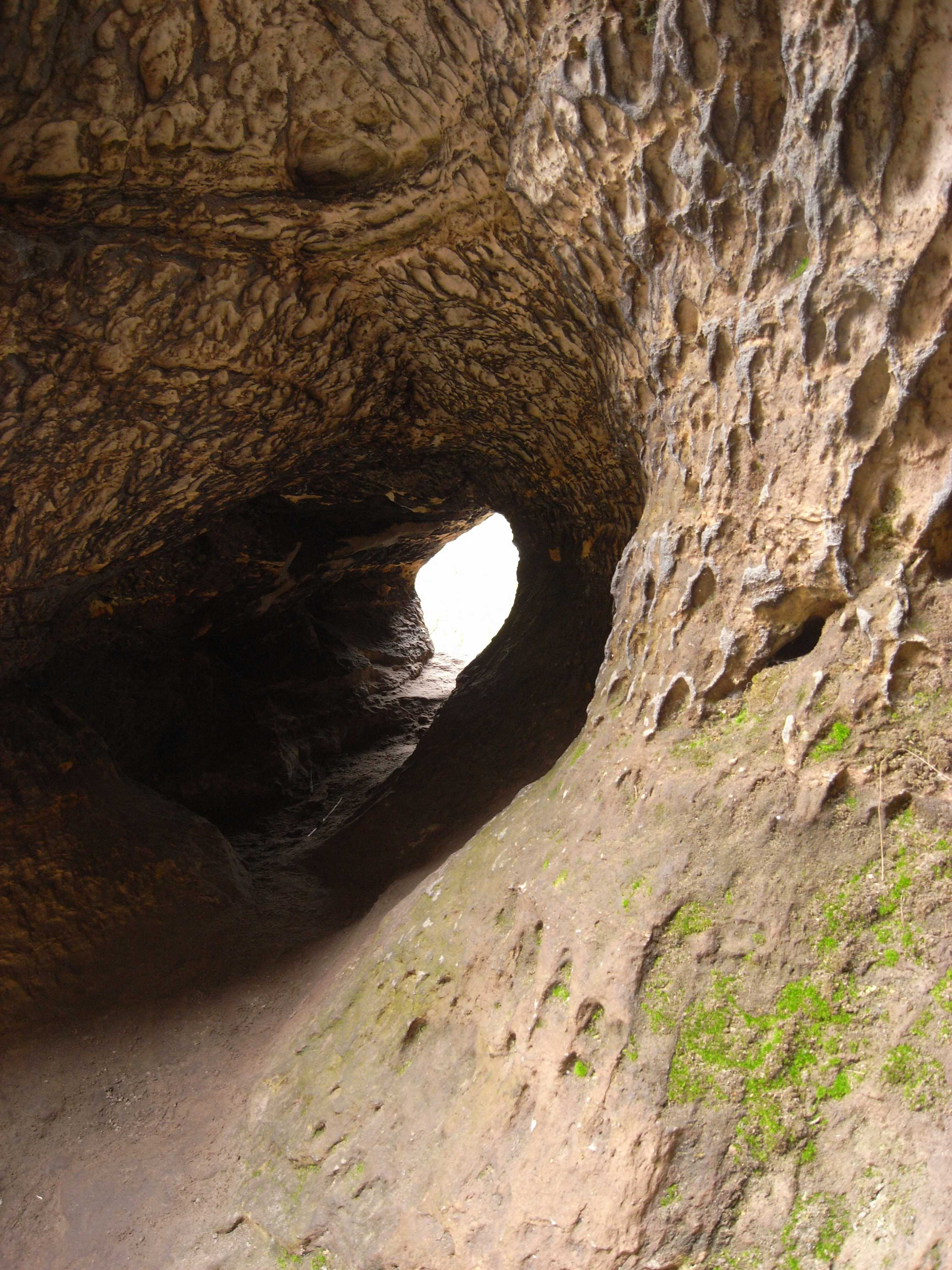
Weathered shapes in a tunnel

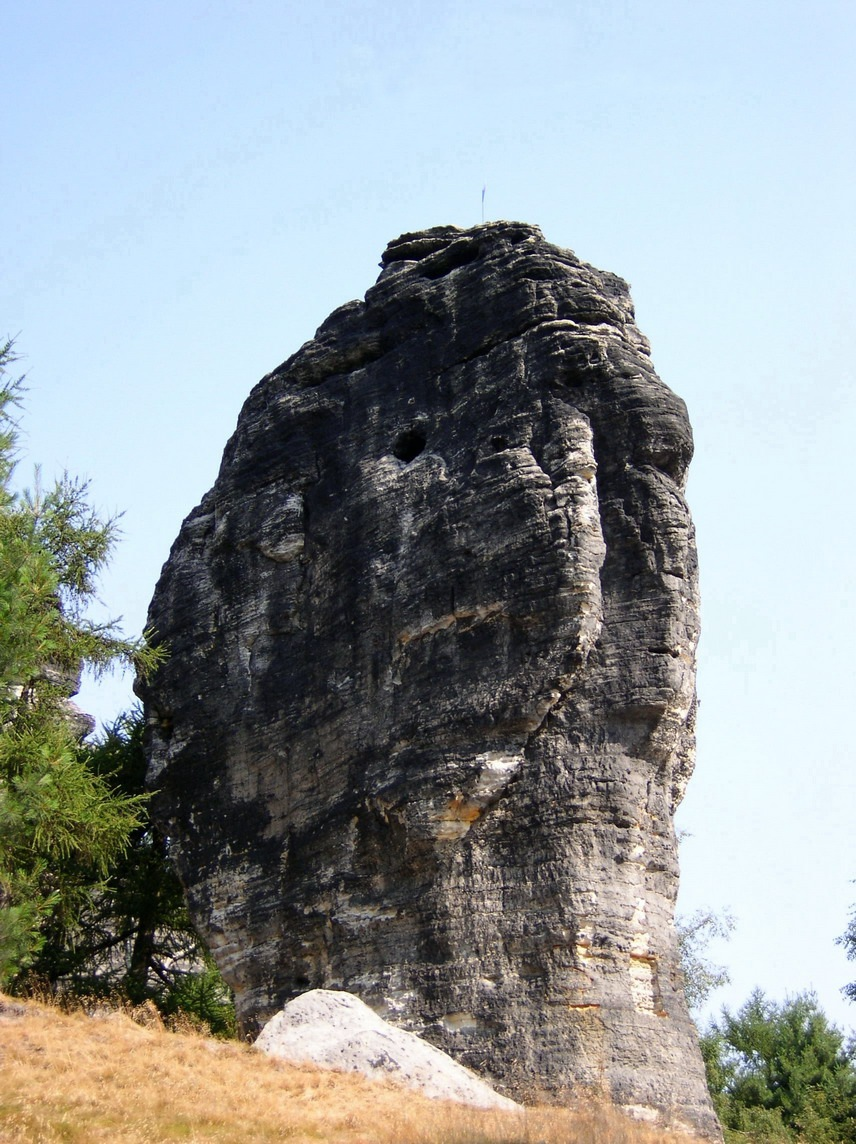
The "Head of Janus"

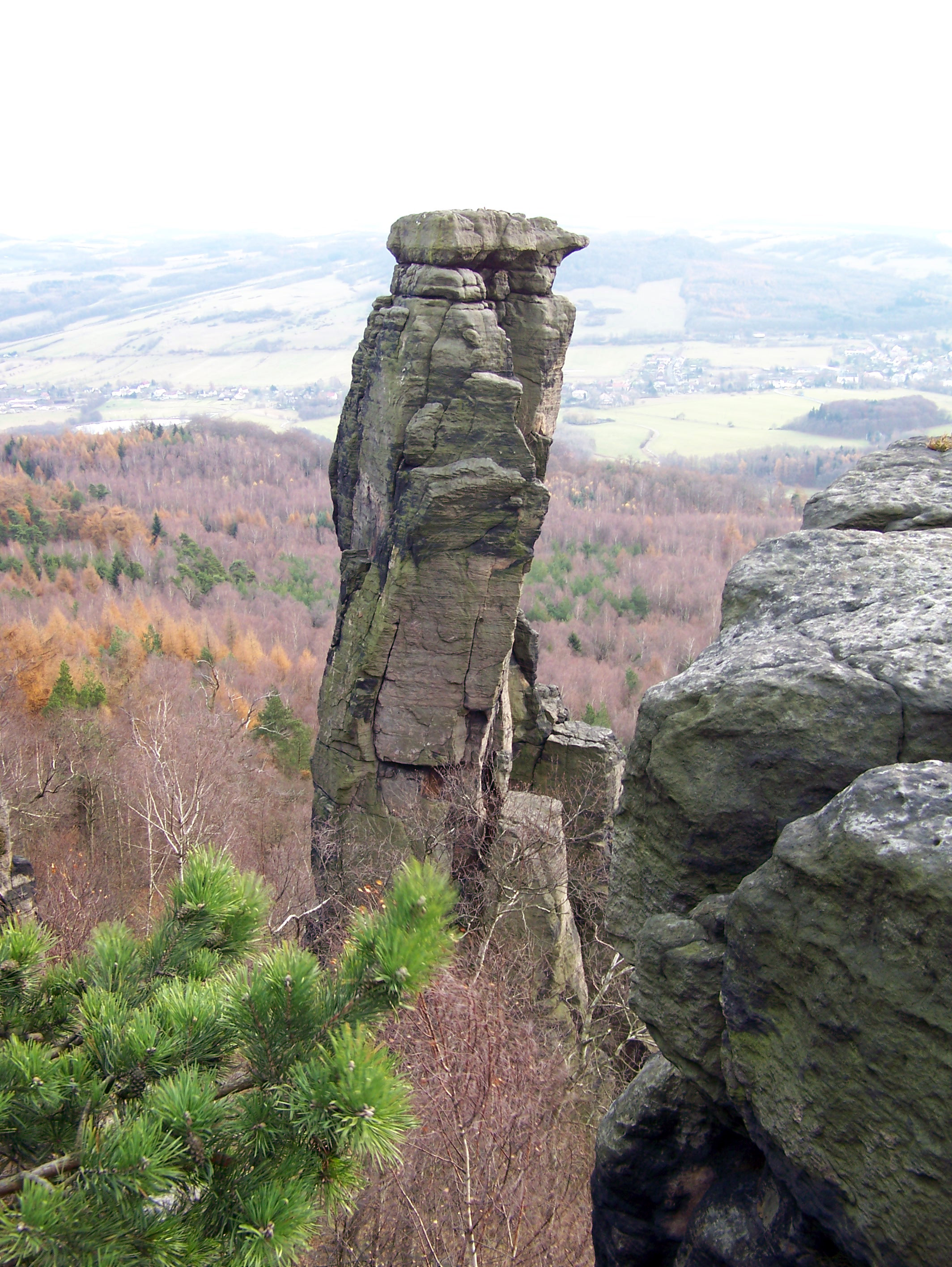
Pinnacle of the Doga Tower

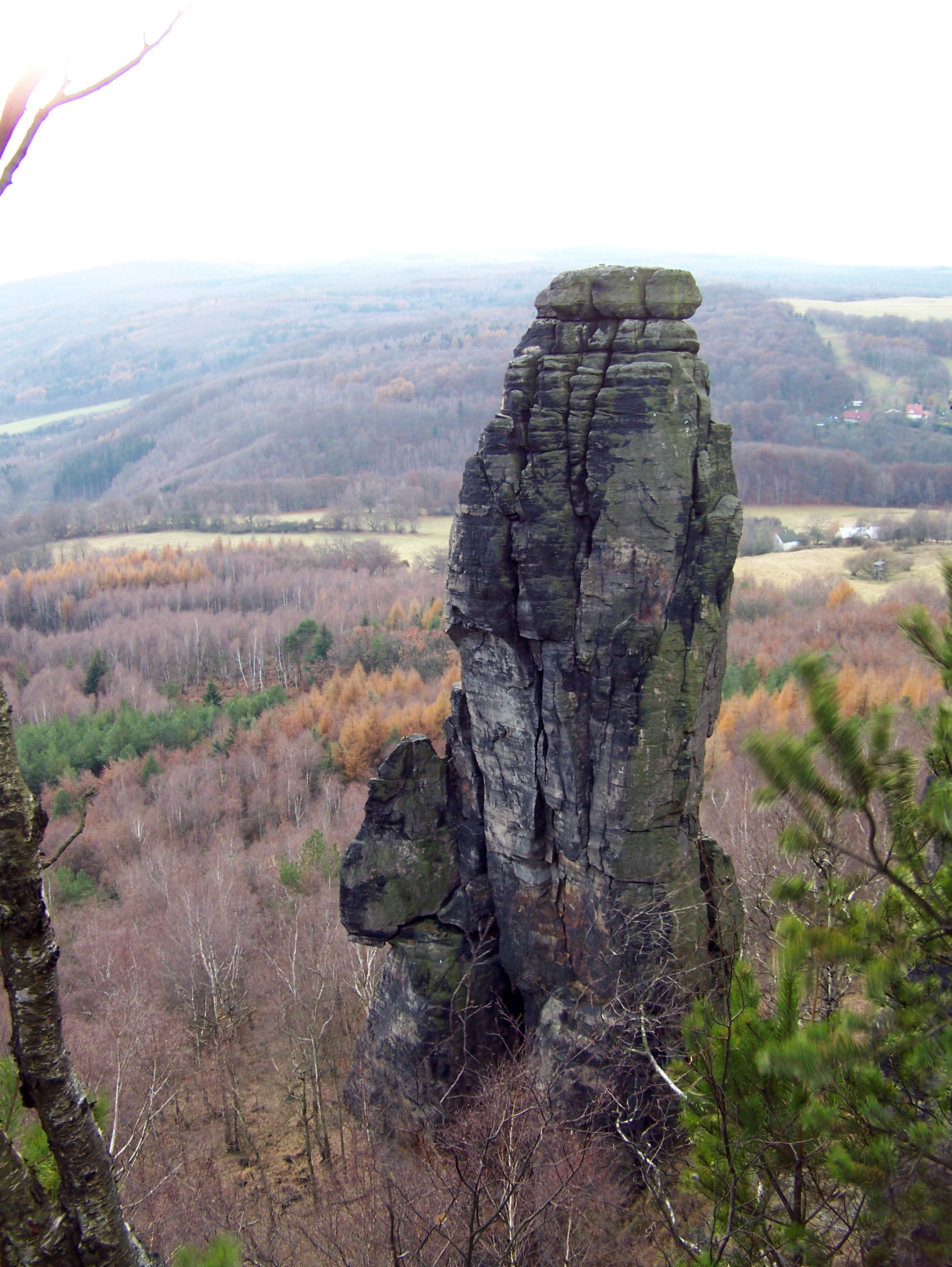
Pinnacle of the Doga Tower

=== Panorama ===
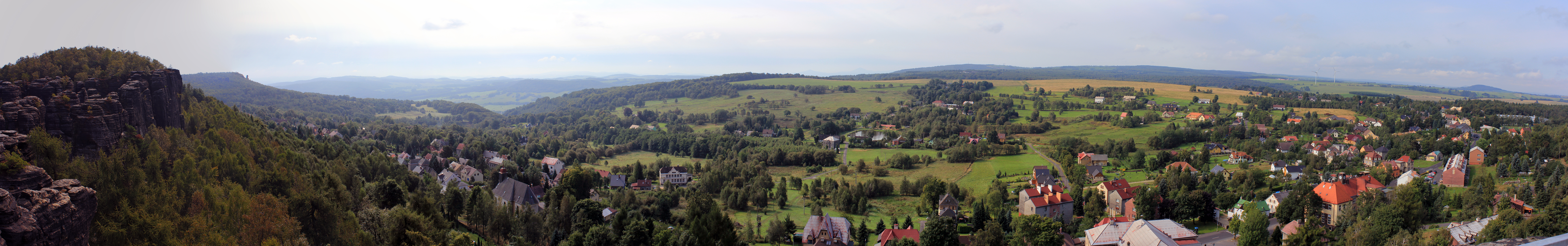
Panoramic view from the so-called Great Tisá Wall across the Most Basin with the Central Bohemian Uplands in the background

== Sources ==
- Albrecht Kittler: Kletterführer Böhmische Schweiz - Raiza und Tyssaer Wände. Verlag Kittler, Dresden 2007
- J. Valečka (Red.): Geologická mapa ČR, List 02-23 Děčín. 1:50,000. Prague (ČGU) 1992, Signaturen 6, 7, 41, 43
- Radim Kettner: Allgemeine Geologie. Bd. 2. Berlin (Deutscher Verlag der Wissenschaften), 1959, p. 293
