= Tisa Ho =

Hong Kong arts administrator and writer (born 1948)

Tisa Ho (born 22 December 1948) is an arts administrator and writer from Hong Kong. She has previously been the director of the Hong Kong Arts Festival and the director of the Singapore Symphony Orchestra, the Singapore Arts Festival, and several public art projects in Singapore, including the Esplanade – Theatres on the Bay, a public arts venue. She has previously been the chair of the International Society of Performing Arts, and received an award from the American Chamber of Commerce in Hong Kong for her contributions, in 2020. She has written several books on arts administration in Asia.

== Biography ==
Ho was born on 22 December 1948 in China. She studied in St. Paul's Convent School in Hong Kong, and pursued art, theater, and music as a child. She went on to attend Hong Kong University, earning a Bachelor of Arts in 1971 and a master's degree in 1973. She studied art history in France, graduating from the University of Bordeaux in 1974 with a degree in French Studies, before completing a diploma in arts management from the City University, London. Her husband Ronald Ng is a hematologist. Her elder son Andrew Ng is an artificial intelligence researcher, and her younger son Alfred Ng is an attorney.

== Career ==
Ho worked for the management of the London Film Festival after completing her diploma in arts administration, later returning to Hong Kong where she worked as the arts and public relations consultation for the Hong Kong Arts Festival. In 1984, she moved to Singapore, and worked at the Singapore Arts Center, where she was responsible for executing the development of the Esplanade – Theatres on the Bay, a public arts venue. In 1986, she began working for Singapore's Ministry of Culture, working for the Cultural Services Division. She established a number of arts initiatives, including creating housing and other grants, and publishing a newsletter, Arts Diary. Ho was appointed the artistic co-ordinator for the Singapore Festival, and curated and marketed the 1988 and 1990 festivals.

From 1990 to 1999, Ho was the executive director for the Singapore Symphony Orchestra. As the director of the orchestra, she established Singapore's International Piano Festival, as well as a series of open-air concerts at the Singapore Botanic Gardens. She also served on the boards of a number of arts-related organisations, including the Singapore Youth Orchestra, the LaSalle College of the Arts, and The Necessary Stage. She was also the president of a women's rights organisation, and wrote several newspaper articles and guidebooks while in Singapore. She is currently the chair of the International Society of Performing Arts, and 2020, received an award from the American Chamber of Commerce in Hong Kong.

In 2006, Ho was appointed the executive director of the Hong Kong Arts Festival. In 2020, Ho oversaw the presentation of a digital, online version of the festival, in response to restrictions relating to the COVID-19 pandemic.

Ho has written several books on arts, public spaces, and artistic projects in Asia. These include Building Social Space in Singapore (2002), Ask Not – The Necessary Stage in Singapore Theatre (2004), and Her Story (2005).
