= Tisá =

- Municipality
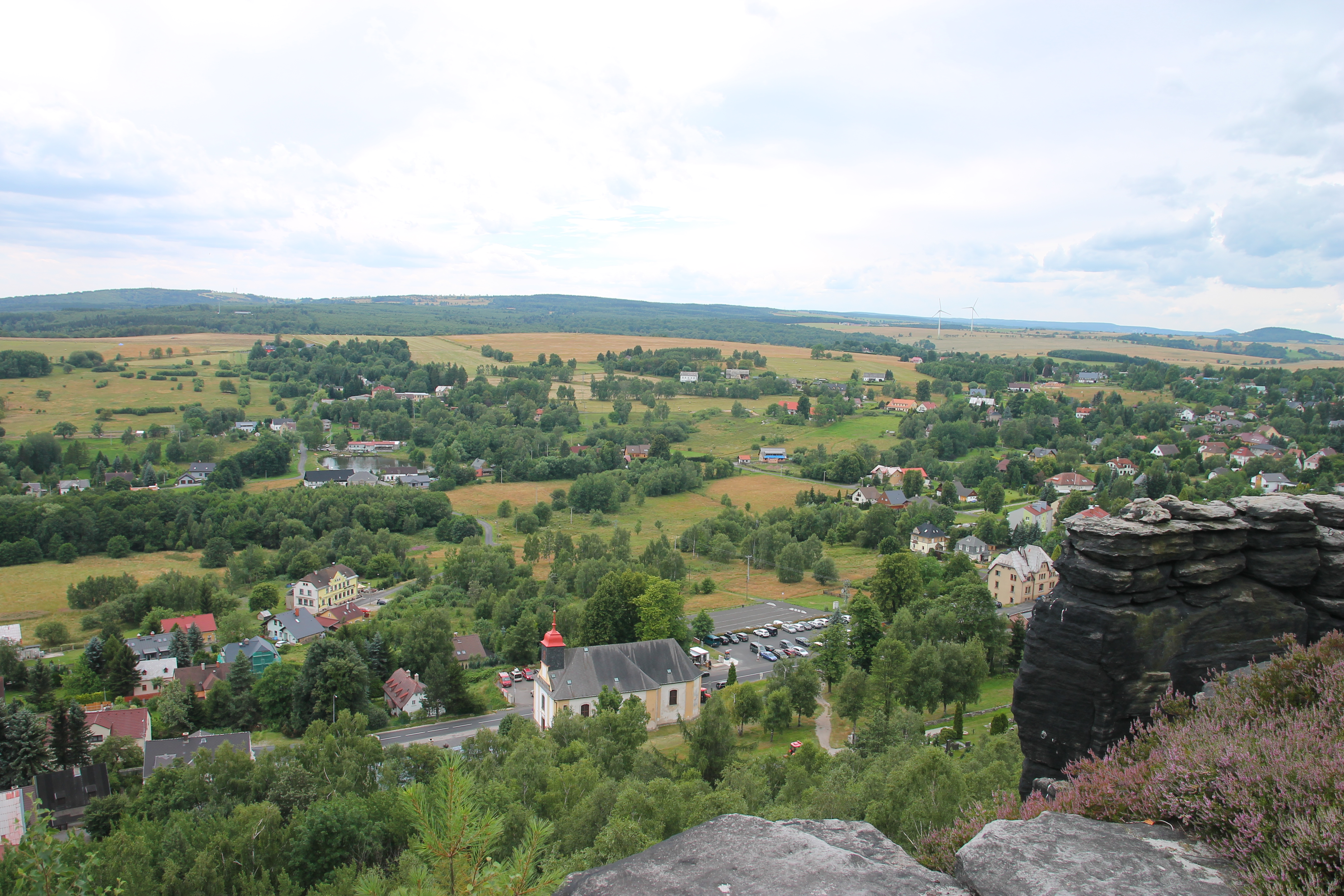
- View of Tisá from the Tisá Rocks

- Flag Coat of arms

- Location in the Czech Republic
- Coordinates: 50°47′4″N 14°1′53″E
- Country: Czech Republic
- Region: Ústí nad Labem
- District: Ústí nad Labem
- First mentioned: 1653

Area
  - Total: 11.86 km^{2} (4.58 sq mi)
- Elevation: 548 m (1,798 ft)

Population (2026-01-01)
  - Total: 994
  - Density: 83.8/km^{2} (217/sq mi)
- Time zone: UTC+1 (CET)
  - Summer (DST): UTC+2 (CEST)
- Postal code: 403 36
- Website: www.tisa.cz

Tisá (German: Tyssa) is a municipality and village in Ústí nad Labem District in the Ústí nad Labem Region of the Czech Republic. It has about 1,000 inhabitants.

== Etymology ==
The name is derived from the Proto-Slavic word tes and the Czech word tis, meaning 'yew'.

== Geography ==
Tisá is located about 12 kilometres (7 mi) north of Ústí nad Labem, on the border with Germany. It lies mostly in the western tip of the Elbe Sandstone Mountains and the České středohoří Protected Landscape Area. The southern part of the municipal territory lies in the Ore Mountains. Tisá is known for a group of rocks within the Elbe Sandstone Mountains, the Tisá Rocks, which are protected as a nature monument.

== History ==
Around the year 500, a group of the Slavs came to the area of today's village. In the 14th century the Vantenberk family usurped an extensive area around Děčín and built a stronghold named Šenov. Under the reign of the Knights of Bünau (Czech: Bynov) there was a major economic expansion. In 1554–1557, Günter I developed a castle with a Lutheran church, presbytery, school and brewery, and the name of the village was changed due to the castle into Schönstein. In 1631, Croatians and Swedes burned all of the objects in Tisá and Schönstein, and Schönstein lost its importance. From 1750, several factories were built, and the municipality became a centre of the button industry.

== Demographics ==
Historical population

Year	Pop.	±%
1869	2,259	—
1880	2,759	+22.1%
1890	2,875	+4.2%
1900	2,917	+1.5%
1910	3,078	+5.5%

Year	Pop.	±%
1921	2,465	−19.9%
1930	2,427	−1.5%
1950	1,083	−55.4%
1961	1,076	−0.6%
1970	885	−17.8%

Year	Pop.	±%
1980	783	−11.5%
1991	600	−23.4%
2001	674	+12.3%
2011	859	+27.4%
2021	988	+15.0%

Source: Censuses

== Transport ==
There are no railways or major roads passing through the municipality.

== Sport ==
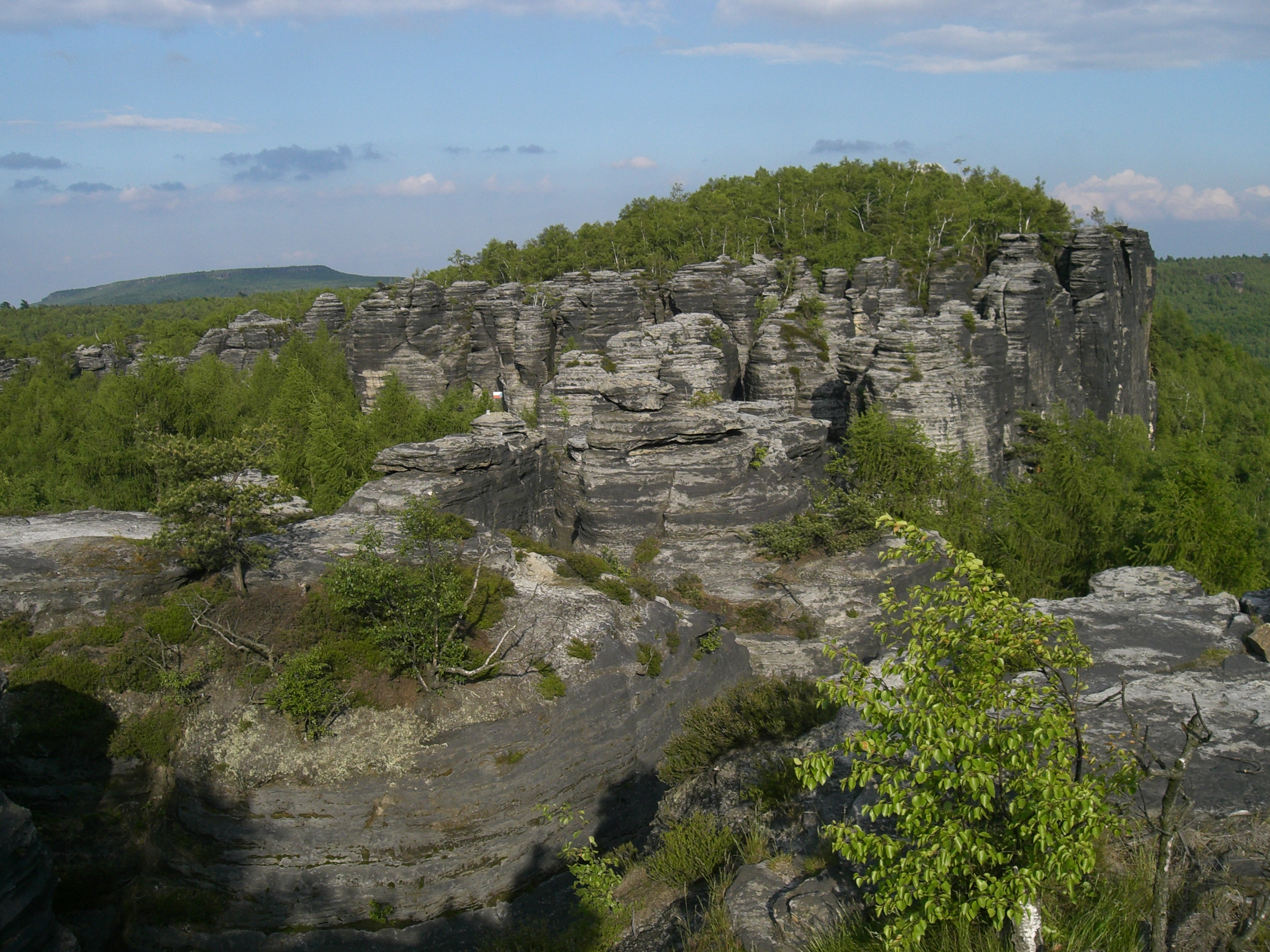
Tisá Rocks

Tisá Rocks are a popular area for rock climbing. The area includes 134 rocks suitable for climbing with a height of 10–50 m.

== Sights ==
The main landmark of the village is the Church of Saint Anne. It was built in the Baroque style in 1789.

== Notable people ==
- Harry Paul (born 1931), German physicist
- Václav Zítek (1932–2011), opera singer
