= High-definition map =

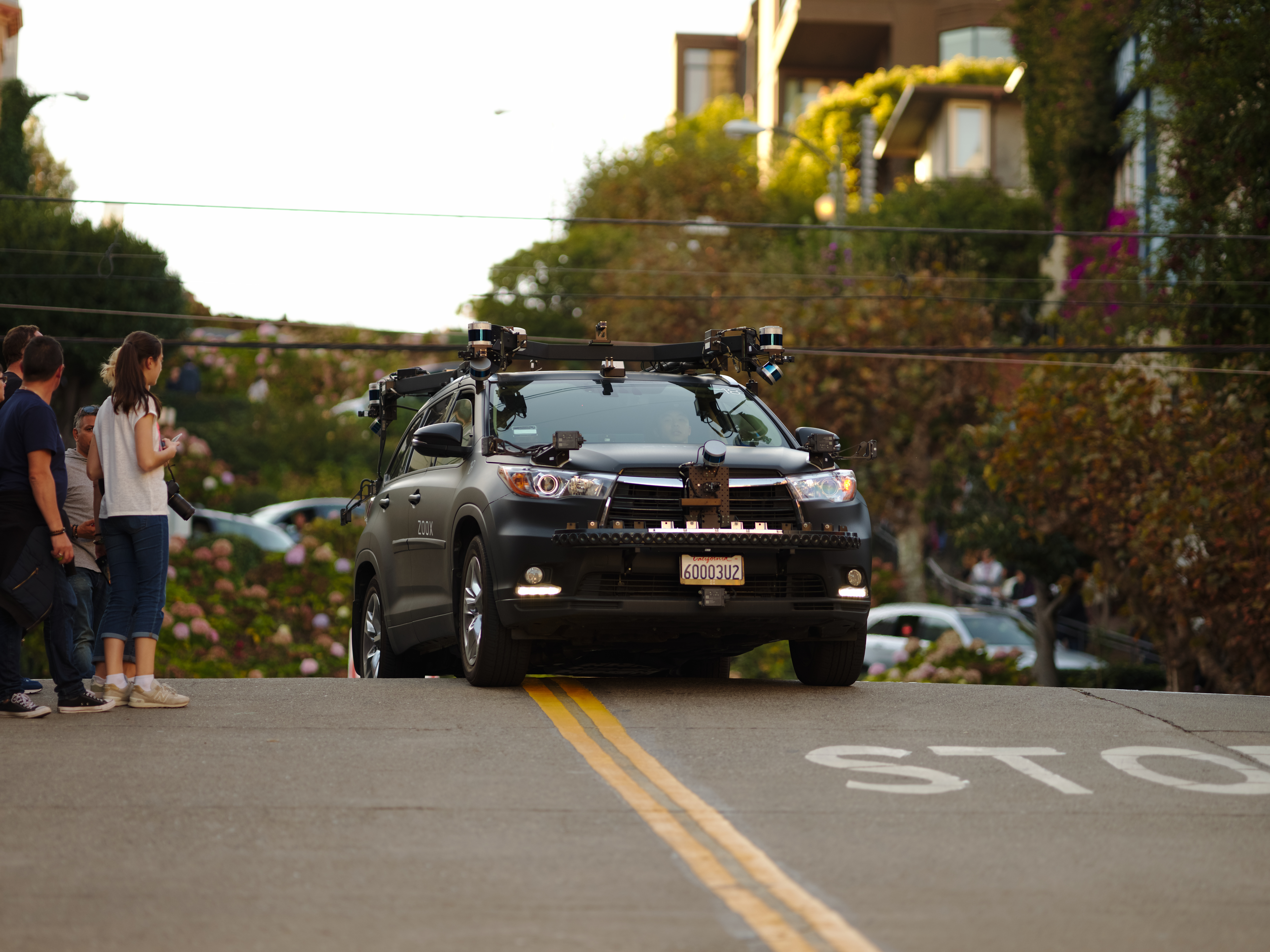
A Zoox autonomous prototype vehicle, outfitted with sensors for sensing and high-definition mapping.

A high-definition map (HD map) is a highly accurate map used primarily in the field of autonomous driving, containing details not normally present on traditional maps. HD maps are often captured using an array of sensors, such as LiDARs, radars, digital cameras, and GPS, and they can also be constructed using aerial imagery. Such maps can be precise at a centimetre level.

High-definition maps for self-driving cars usually include map elements such as road shape, road marking, traffic signs, and barriers. Maintaining high accuracy is one of the biggest challenges in building HD maps of real-world roads. With regard to accuracy, there are two main focus points that determine the quality of an HD map:

- Global accuracy (positioning of a feature on the surface of the Earth).
- Local accuracy (positioning of a feature in relation to road elements around it).

In areas with good GPS reception it is possible to achieve a global accuracy of less than 3 cm (1.2 in) deviation using satellite signals and correction data from base stations.

In GPS-denied areas, however, inaccuracy rises with distance traveled through the area, being largest in its middle. This means that the maximum GPS error can be expressed as a percentage of the distance traveled through a GPS-denied area: this value is less than 0.5%.
