= Noble Roman's =

Pizza company based in Indianapolis, Indiana

Noble Roman's, Inc.
- Type: Public
- Traded as: OTCQB: NROM
- Industry: Food
- Founded: 1972; 54 years ago in Bloomington, Indiana
- Founders: Stephen Huse and Gary Knackstedt
- Headquarters: Indianapolis, Indiana
- Number of locations: 4 (original), 14 (Craft Pizza & Pub)
- Area served: United States
- Key people: Paul W. Mobley, Chairman of the Board and Chief Financial Officer; Scott Mobley, President and CEO
- Products: Pizza, salads, subs
- Revenue: ▲US$14.4 million (2022)
- Operating income: ▼US$427,716 (2022)
- Net income: ▼US$−1.05 million (2022)
- Total assets: ▼US$18.3 million (2022)
- Total equity: ▲US$24.8 million (2022)
- Number of employees: 207 (2022)
- Website: www.nobleromans.com

Noble Roman's is an American pizza company based in Indianapolis, Indiana.

== History ==
=== Founding to 1990s ===
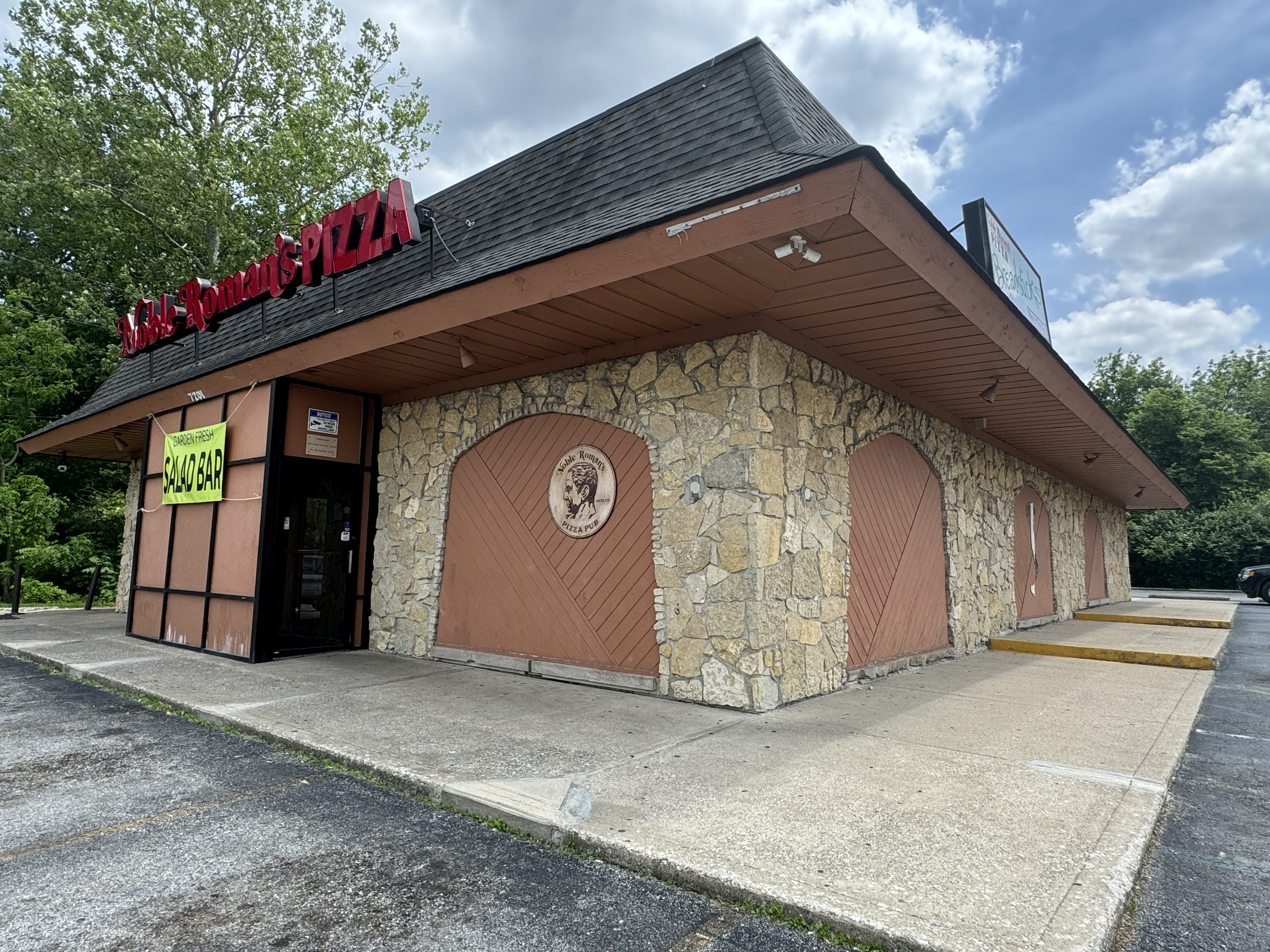
The last remaining original Noble Roman's, built in 1974, in Indianapolis, Indiana

Noble Roman's was founded in Bloomington, Indiana, when Stephen Huse and Gary Knackstedt acquired a failed pizza shop near the campus of Indiana University in 1969. The company incorporated in 1972, with the first franchise following in 1973.

In the 1980s and 1990s, Noble Roman's expanded heavily outside of Indiana, opening new locations in Ohio, and other states; and issuing an IPO in 1982. In 1996, Noble Roman's attempted to purchase Papa Gino's, which was in the process of acquiring D'Angelo's Grilled Sandwiches chain from PepsiCo's Pizza Hut division (Noble Roman's notable competitor). But in the next year, the deal fell through, and eventually it was delisted from NASDAQ after it fell to $1 per share.

=== 2000s expansion and contraction ===
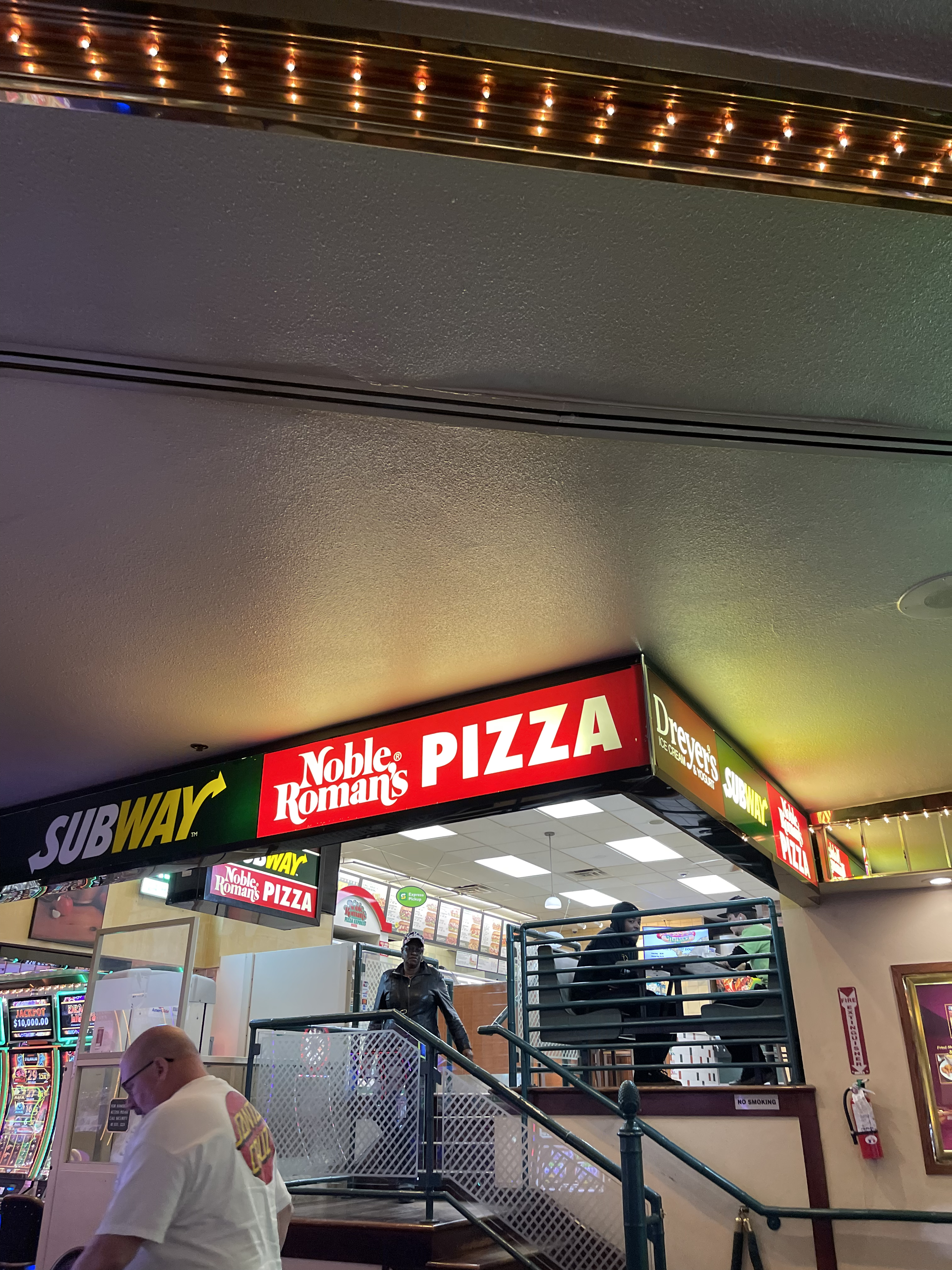
A Noble Roman's at the Four Queens in Las Vegas, Nevada (2022).

During the mid-2000s, the company launched an aggressive nationwide expansion campaign based on a franchising model. When the chain's economic problems began to come to light in 2008, they had over 1000 locations in operation and over 600 more under construction. Owners of failing locations filed lawsuits claiming that Noble Roman's "sold a dual-branded startup concept that the company knew was operationally flawed and too complicated to operate profitably", "did little to no market testing", and that "the company provides no marketing support or operational backup".

Noble Roman's became embroiled in multiple lawsuits with its franchisees. Franchisees have described the company as "distinguished...by its high franchisee failure rates, and its insistence on suing franchise owners once they fail." Other franchisees allege that the company "has used litigation as a revenue source," and as of 2009, was "involved with litigation with every one of their franchisees."

=== Since 2010 ===
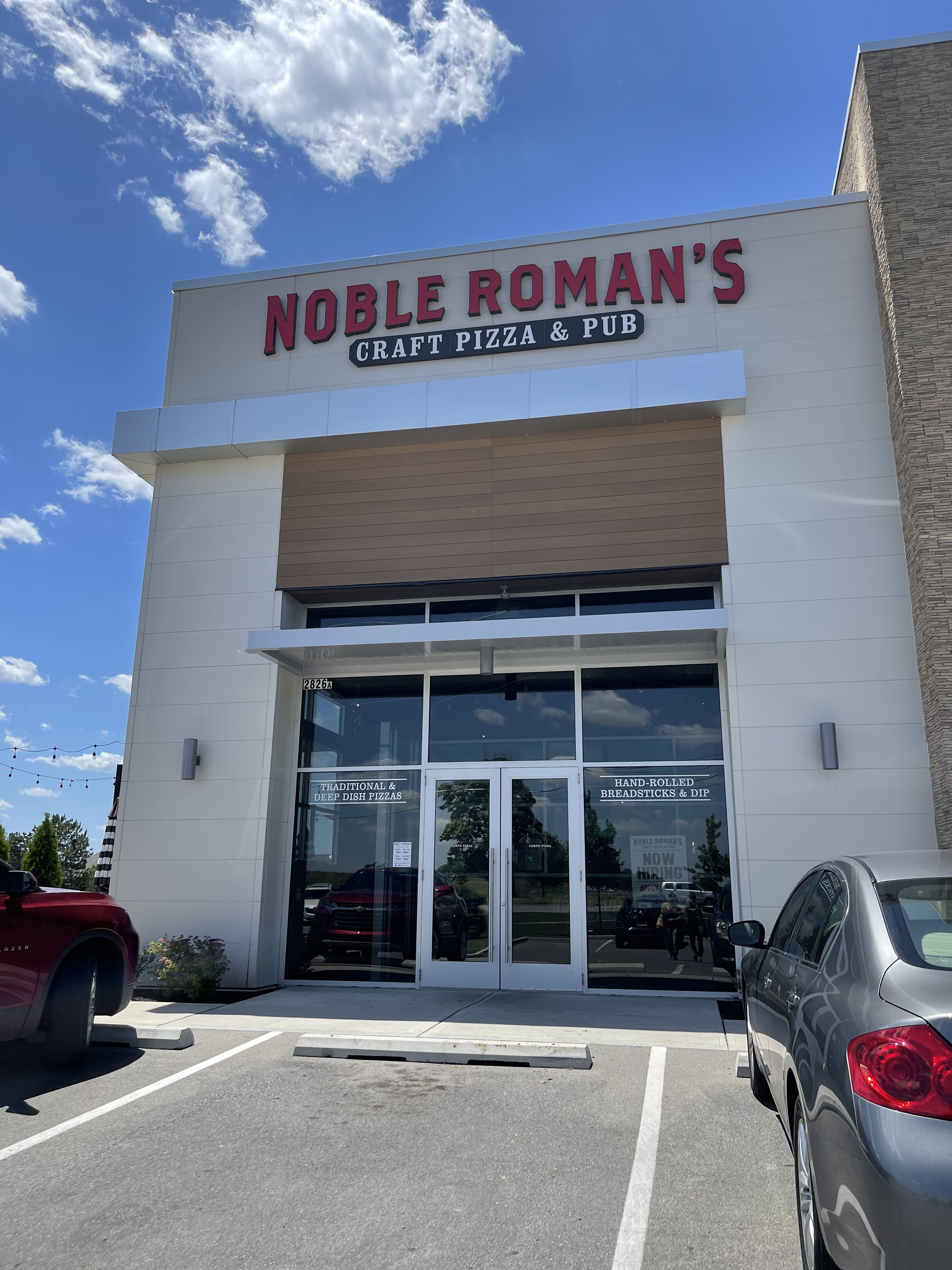
Noble Roman's Craft Pizza & Pub in Greenwood, Indiana in 2022.

By the end of 2020, almost all of the 1000-plus locations that operated at the chain's 2008 peak had closed. At the time, the company operated 7 corporate-owned locations and 3 franchised locations. The company's revenue vs. non-capital operational expenses showed a significant gross margin at the corporate-owned locations and a modest revenue stream from the franchises. However, when debt service and rent costs were factored in, the company exhibited an overall loss in 2020.

After the collapse of its franchising arm, the company made several attempts to enter other markets, all of which existed more in press releases than reality. Announced plans of this nature included selling reheat-and-serve products in supermarkets, serving fresh products for eating inside supermarket cafes, and supplying pizzas for on-site preparation by employees of "nontraditional locations" such as "convenience stores, military bases, and bowling alleys". While all of these business model pivots were promoted heavily in the trade press, none of them actually materialized beyond test markets. In the 3rd quarterly earnings report that came out in November 2016, the company had announced its decision to “discontinue expansion of its stand-alone take-n-bake concept, so that management’s efforts could be fully focused on the modernized Craft Pizza & Pub.”

In November 2014, Scott Mobley replaced his father, Paul Mobley, as president and CEO while the elder remained chairman.

== Current restaurants ==
- Craft Pizza & Pub (14 locations)
- Noble Roman's Pizza (4 traditional locations – Indianapolis, Columbus, New Castle, Evansville; 37 express locations)

== See also ==
- List of pizza chains of the United States
