= Yum! Brands =

American multinational fast food corporation

Yum! Brands, Inc.
- Formerly: Tricon Global Restaurants, Inc. (1997–2002)
- Type: Public
- Traded as: NYSE: YUM; S&P 500 component
- Industry: Food service
- Predecessor: PepsiCo
- Founded: November 8, 1977; 49 years ago (as a subsidiary of PepsiCo); October 6, 1997; 29 years ago (as a separate entity)
- Headquarters: Louisville, Kentucky, U.S.
- Number of locations: 61,000 (2025)
- Area served: Worldwide
- Key people: Brian Cornell; (non-executive chairman); Chris Turner (CEO); Tracy Skeans (COO)
- Revenue: ▲US$8.214 billion (2025)
- Net income: ▲US$1.559 billion (2025)
- Number of employees: Over 1 million (est.) (Including subsidiaries and franchises)
- Subsidiaries: KFC; Taco Bell; Habit Burger & Grill; Heartstyles; Tictuk Technologies; Kvantum; Dragontail Systems
- Website: yum.com

Yum! Brands, Inc. (sometimes called just Yum!) is an American multinational fast food corporation. Based in Louisville, Kentucky, the company operates KFC, Taco Bell, Habit Burger & Grill, and several technology companies. As of 2024 Yum! is the world's second largest fast food restaurant chain by gross revenues, after McDonald's, though the large majority of Yum! locations are independently owned franchises and the parent company's revenue is substantially lower than gross revenues.

In 2016, Yum! had 43,617 restaurants, including 2,859 that were company-owned and 40,758 that were franchised, in 135 nations and territories worldwide.

Yum! was formed as Tricon Global Restaurants in 1997 as a spin-off of PepsiCo. The spin-off consists of PepsiCo's former fast food restaurant division, which was originally established after PepsiCo first entered the restaurant business when it acquired Pizza Hut in 1977. Yum! took its current name in 2002 after merging with Yorkshire Global Restaurants, which at the time was the parent company of A&W. Yum!'s Chinese operations were spun off in 2016 as Yum China. Pizza Hut was divested in 2026.

Yum's Taco Bell and KFC (as part of the spin-off), alongside Habit Burger & Grill (since July 2024), currently serve Pepsi (with exceptions in certain markets like Israel and New Zealand, where Coca-Cola is served instead) as part of a perpetual agreement with PepsiCo, however starting in January 2027, KFC will begin serving Coke in the US with the rollout to be completed by spring of that same year, ending the perpetual deal.

== History ==
=== PepsiCo fast food division ===
The company's history began in 1977, when PepsiCo entered the restaurant business by acquiring Pizza Hut from co-founders Dan and Frank Carney. A year later, PepsiCo purchased Taco Bell from founder Glen Bell. In July 1986, R. J. Reynolds sold KFC to PepsiCo to pay off debt from its recent purchase of Nabisco.

In 1990, Hot 'n Now was acquired via Taco Bell from William Van Domelen, but the company was sold in 1996. In 1992, PepsiCo acquired California Pizza Kitchen. In 1993, it acquired Chevys Fresh Mex, D'Angelo Grilled Sandwiches, and the American division of Canadian chain East Side Mario's. These chains were later sold when PepsiCo exited the restaurant business and spun off KFC, Pizza Hut and Taco Bell (see next paragraph). In 1997, PepsiCo sold PepsiCo Food Systems restaurant-supply unit to Ameriserve Food Distribution Inc.

=== Tricon Global Restaurants ===
Logo of Tricon

Yum! was created in 1997 as Tricon Global Restaurants, Inc. from PepsiCo's fast food division as the parent corporation of the KFC, Pizza Hut and Taco Bell restaurant companies. The decision was announced in January and the spin off was effected on October 6. Before the Tricon name was introduced in June 1997, the company was referred to by the placeholder name "Great American Restaurant Company". Tricon selected Louisville, also the site of KFC's headquarters, as its corporate headquarters. Taco Bell and Pizza Hut continued to be headquartered in Irvine, California and Dallas, Texas, respectively.

In 2000, Tricon Global tested multi-branded locations with Yorkshire Global Restaurants, parent company of A&W and Long John Silver's. By March 2002, the Tricon-Yorkshire multibranding test consisted of 83 KFC/A&Ws, six KFC/Long John Silver's and three Taco Bell/Long John Silver's and was considered successful by the companies.

In 2001, KFC started test restaurants in Austin, Texas, called "Wing Works", a chicken wing line sold with one of a few flavored sauces. KFC also hired a consultant to develop a breakfast menu.

Tricon bought both A&W and LJS from Grotech in March 2002, shortly before the merger announcement.

=== Yum! Brands ===
In March 2002, Yorkshire announced it would merge with Tricon Global Restaurants to form Yum! Brands. The merger was finalized on May 8, 2002, and the name change became effective on May 22, 2002. Tricon had previously used "YUM", an exclamation representing enjoyment of food, as its stock ticker symbol since it was spun off in 1997. On June 6, 2002, Yum! executed a two-for-one stock split. Shortly afterwards, due to Yum!'s then full contract with Pepsi post spin-off, Long John Silver's and A&W Restaurants (which previously served Coca-Cola products) began switching to Pepsi products, with A&W Restaurants retaining A&W Root Beer from a separate deal with Cadbury Schweppes (now Keurig Dr Pepper).

In 2002, Yum! began testing co-branding locations pairing Pizza Hut with Pasta Bravo, Back Yard Burgers, and A&W. The Pasta Bravo concept was acquired in 2003 from Pasta Bravo, Inc. of Aliso Viejo, California for $5 million to pair with Pizza Hut.

In 2003, Yum! launched WingStreet as a hybrid combo unit with an existing Pizza Hut franchise. In 2007 and 2008, a thousand WingStreet stores a year were opened. On October 19, 2009, Company president Scott Bergren publicized WingStreet's national launch.

An East Dawning test cafeteria-style restaurant was opened in Shanghai in 2004. After initially failing, Yum! Brands chose the KFC business model (KFC is the most successful Western chain in China) and found greater success. As of September 30, 2007, eight East Dawning restaurants were in operation.

In January 2026, Yum! Brands announced it had signed a 10-year lease in the PNC Tower in downtown Louisville for its new headquarters, with plans to invest $12 million to renovate five floors. The company plans to move 550 employees to its new headquarters in late 2026.

=== International focus ===
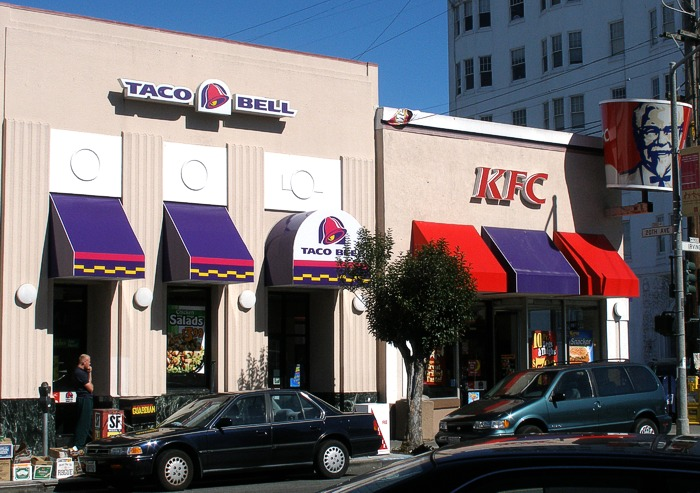
A single Yum! restaurant facility co-branded as Taco Bell and KFC in San Francisco, California

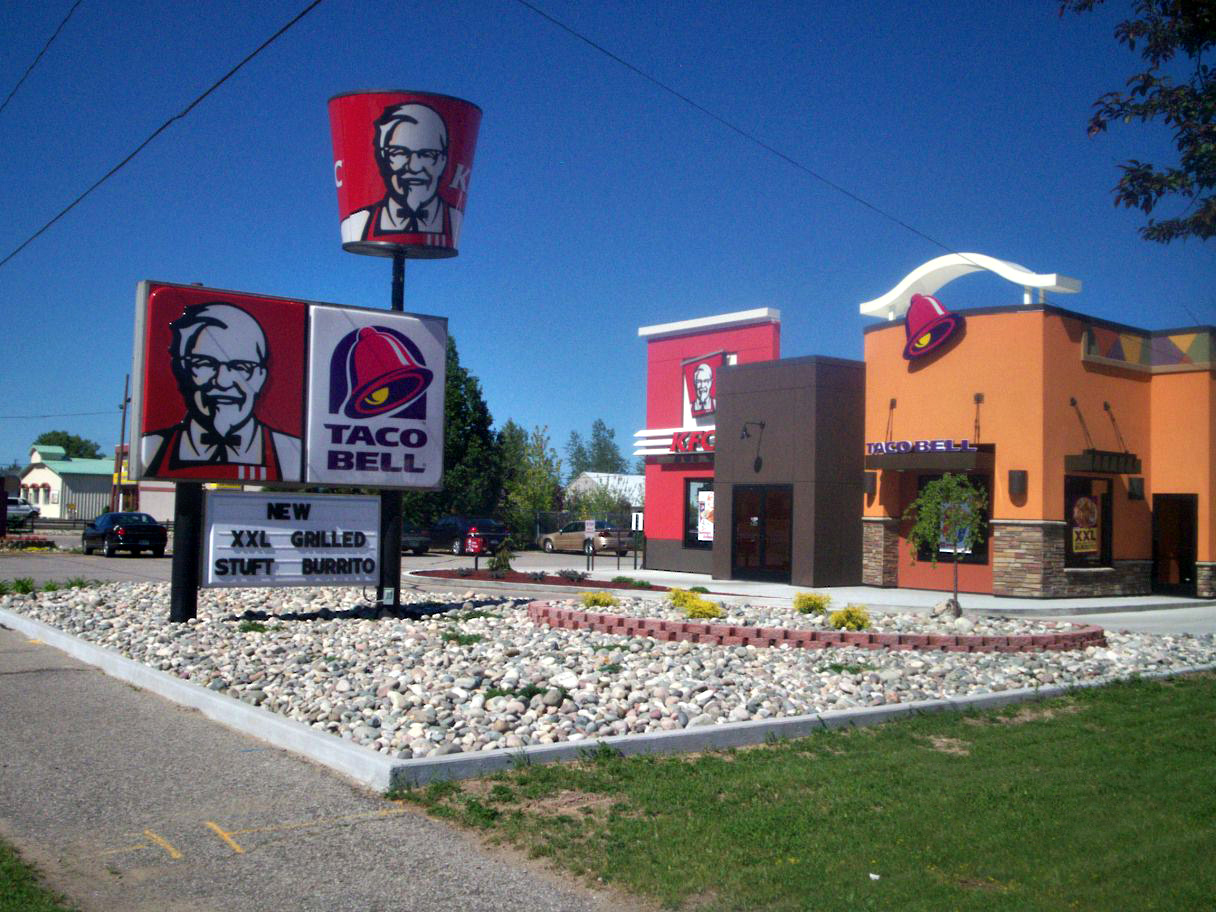
Another cobranded KFC and Taco Bell in Oscoda, Michigan

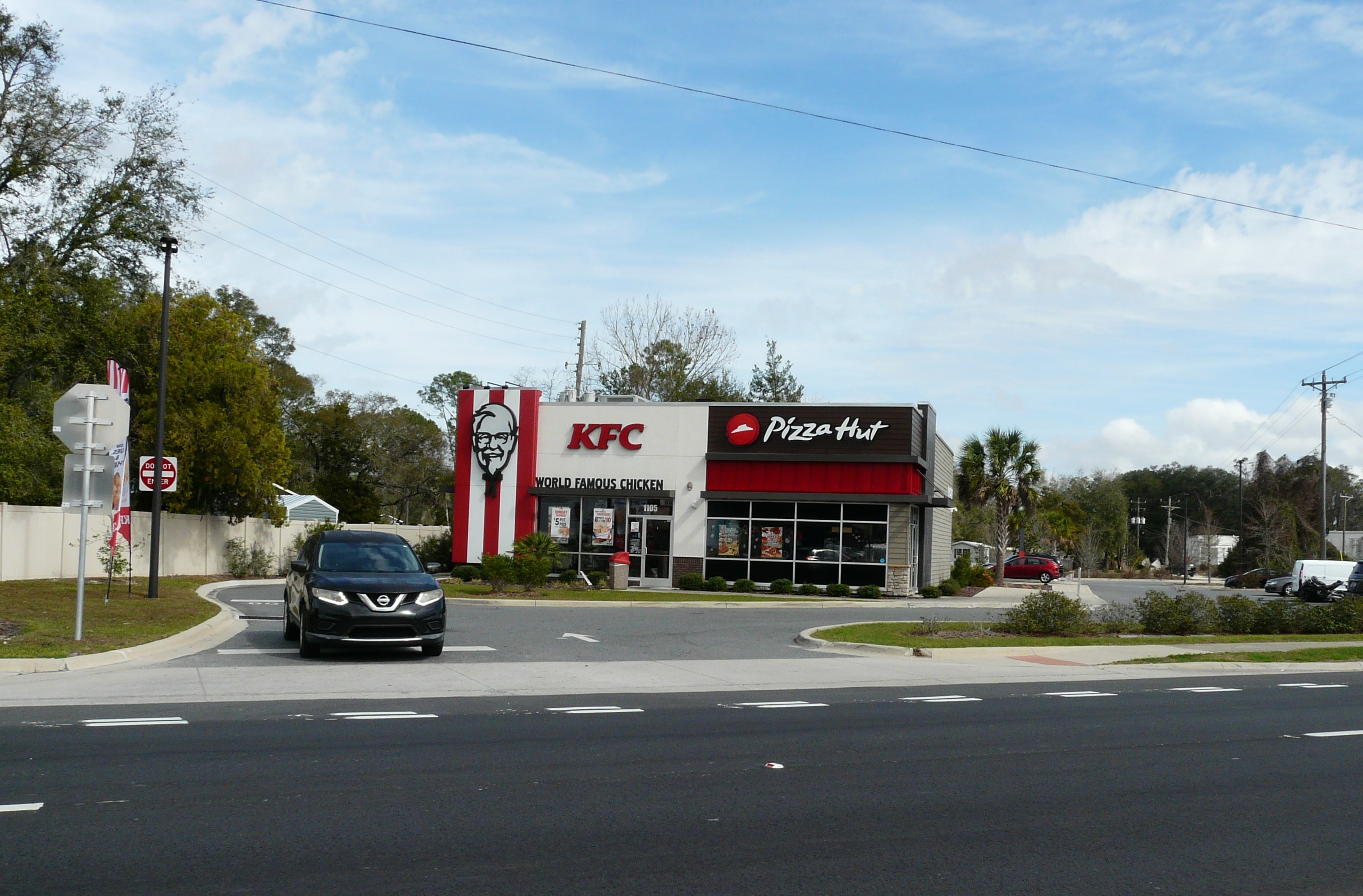
Cobranded KFC and Pizza Hut in Chiefland, Florida

In January 2011, Yum! announced its intentions to dispose of its Long John Silver's and A&W brands to focus on its core brands of KFC, Pizza Hut and Taco Bell. For the decade leading up to the company's announcement, major growth had relied on international expansion. With little presence outside North America, the two chains no longer fit in the company's long-term growth plans. The foreign expansion—particularly that of Taco Bell, KFC and Pizza Hut—was cited in the firm's January 18, 2011, announcement of its intention to dispose of the A&W and Long John Silver's chains. Both of those chains also suffered from poor sales, and had fewer locations compared to the other chains in the Yum! Brands portfolio. In September 2011, Yum! announced they had found buyers for the A&W and Long John Silver's chains. A Great American Brand bought A&W, and Long John Silver's was sold to LJS Partners LLC.

In May 2011, Yum! agreed to purchase Chinese hot pot chain Little Sheep for HK$4.56 billion. The deal spent more than 4 months in antitrust review by the Chinese Ministry of Commerce, to determine whether or not the transaction would result in a monopolistic positioning of Yum! in the country's restaurant industry. The Ministry approved the deal in November 2011, according to Little Sheep representatives.

In 2012, a KFC opened in Ramallah and became the first American fast food restaurant to operate in the West Bank; a Pizza Hut was also planned.

In India, Thailand, Nepal, and Nigeria, Yum! Brands operates primarily through its largest franchise partner, Devyani International Limited, which manages numerous KFC, Pizza Hut, and Taco Bell outlets.

Yum! Brands opened its 40,000th store in Calangute, Goa, India in October 2013.

In the third quarter of 2013, Yum! Brands had to book an impairment of the goodwill resulting from the takeover of Little Sheep in 2011 in the amount of $222 million, which reduced profits for 2013.

In 2014, Yum! launched a number of additional restaurant test concepts, Super Chix, U.S. Taco Co. and Banh Shop. Yum! opened Super Chix in Central Arlington, Texas, a restaurant similar in format to Chick-fil-A, on April 9, 2014. In the summer of 2014, Yum!'s Taco Bell subsidiary launched its U.S. Taco Co and Urban Tap Room fast-casual taco concept restaurant in Huntington Beach, California, to take on fast casual restaurants like Chipotle and Panera.

In the first quarter of 2015, Third Point Management and Corvex Management separately acquired an unspecified stake in the company. A second Chix unit opened in May 2015 with additional menu items. Super Chix was sold to founder Nick Ouimet and an investment group in August 2015.

In 2017, Yum! announced plans to open 10 Pizza Hut restaurants in Ethiopia, after signing a franchise with the country's Belayab Foods and Franchise PLC.

In January 2020, Yum! announced they were acquiring Irvine, California-based The Habit Burger Grill, for $375 million; the transaction was completed on March 18, 2020. The company was renamed Habit Burger & Grill in 2024.

In 2020 and 2021, Yum! acquired several technology companies. In March 2020, it acquired Heartstyles, an omnichannel training company. In March 2021, it acquired Tictuk Technologies, an Israeli omnichannel ordering and marketing solutions provider, and announced it was acquiring Kvantum Inc., an artificial intelligence-based consumer insights and marketing technology company. In September 2021, Yum! completed the acquisition of Australian kitchen order management and delivery technology company Dragontail Systems for US$69.1 million in cash.

In December 2023, the company announced it will acquire 218 restaurants from its largest franchisee EG Group in the UK and Ireland. After completion in 2024, all of the privately owned EG Group's KFC UK and Ireland businesses will come under Yum's KFC UK and Ireland management.

In April 2026, Yum! was pursuing a deal that would separate the Pizza Hut brand as a private company. Pizza Hut's profitability was lagging behind stronger revenue from Taco Bell, leading to Yum seeking a sale. In June, it was reported that Pizza Hut's mainland China business was to be sold for $1.2 billion to Yum China Holdings, Inc., while the rest of the business was to be sold to LongRange Capital for $1.5 billion. The acquisition in China was completed on August 7, 2026, while the acquisition in the rest of the world was completed on September 1, 2026.

On October 15, 2026, it was announced that KFC will switch from Pepsi to Coca-Cola starting in January 2027, and to be fully completed by spring.

=== Animal welfare ===
In 2021, Yum! Brands committed to transitioning to 100% cage-free eggs in the majority of its locations by 2026, and globally by 2030.

== Corporate ==
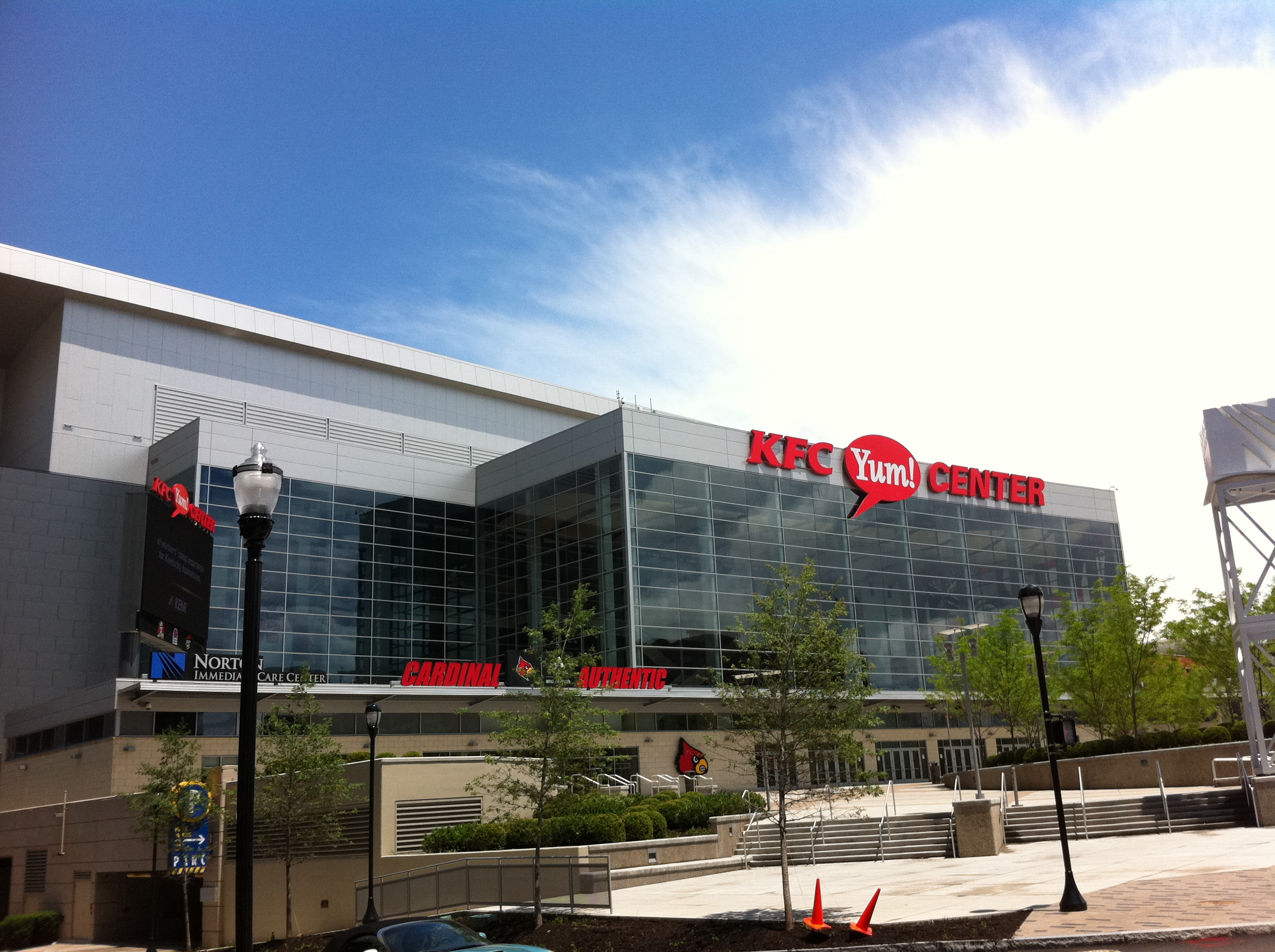
The KFC Yum! Center, Louisville's largest arena

The current CEO of Yum! Brands is Chris Turner. He succeeded David Gibbs as CEO in October 2025. Former CEOs include Greg Creed and David C. Novak. Novak became CEO of predecessor firm Tricon Global on January 1, 2000, and chairman of the board on January 1, 2001. Greg Creed replaced Novak in his role as CEO on January 1, 2015. At the AGM in May 2016, Robert D. Walter became non-executive chairman. At the end of 2019 Greg Creed retired as CEO and the COO at that time (David Gibbs) was Creed's replacement and was promoted to CEO.

Since 2006, Yum! Brands has served as the corporate sponsor of the Kentucky Derby.

On October 20, 2015, Yum! announced that it intended to separate into two independent, publicly traded companies. Yum China was spun off on November 1, 2016. Yum China's operations excluded stores in Hong Kong, Macau and Taiwan, which are franchised from Yum Brands through Jardine Matheson unit Jardine Pacific's Jardine Restaurant Group.

== Brands ==
=== Current ===
- KFC
- Taco Bell
- Banh Shop (minority investor)
- Habit Burger & Grill

=== Former ===
- A&W Restaurants – Sold to A Great American Brand LLC, a consortium of A&W franchisees, in 2011
- D'Angelo Grilled Sandwiches – Sold to Papa Gino's in 1997
- Hot 'n Now – Acquired by PepsiCo in 1990, placed under the Taco Bell branch. Now mostly defunct, with only 1 out of 150 remaining in Sturgis, Michigan, now owned by BTND, LLC the owner of Burger Time
- Long John Silver's – Sold to LJS Partners, Long John Silver's franchisees and other private investors, in 2011
- Pasta Bravo
- Super Chix
- East Dawning – Spun off into Yum China in 2016
- Little Sheep – Spun off into Yum China in 2016
- Pizza Hut – Sold to LongRange Capital and Yum China in 2026

== See also ==
- List of major employers in Louisville, Kentucky
- Yum China
- Restaurant Brands
