= Habit Burger & Grill =

American fast casual restaurant chain

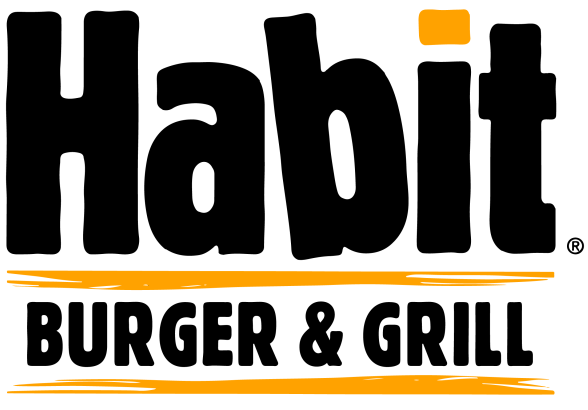
- Trade name: Habit Burger & Grill
- Formerly: The Habit Burger Grill
- Type: Subsidiary
- Traded as: Nasdaq: HABT
- Industry: Fast casual restaurant
- Founded: November 15, 1969; 56 years ago Santa Barbara, California, U.S.
- Headquarters: Irvine, California, U.S.
- Number of locations: 372
- Area served: United States, Cambodia, China, United Arab Emirates
- Key people: Shannon Hennessy (CEO); Tiffany Furman (CFO)
- Products: Chargrilled burgers; sandwiches; salads; kids meals; frozen desserts; beverages
- Revenue: ▲US$402 million (2021)
- Number of employees: 6,093 (2021)
- Parent: Yum! Brands
- Website: www.habitburger.com

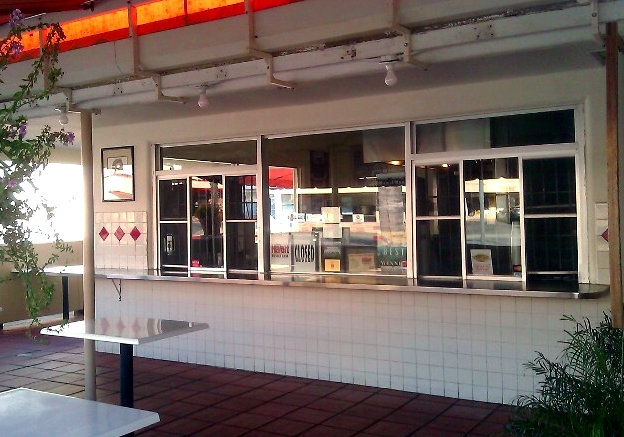
Original location of the first Habit Burger Grill restaurant in Goleta, which opened in 1969

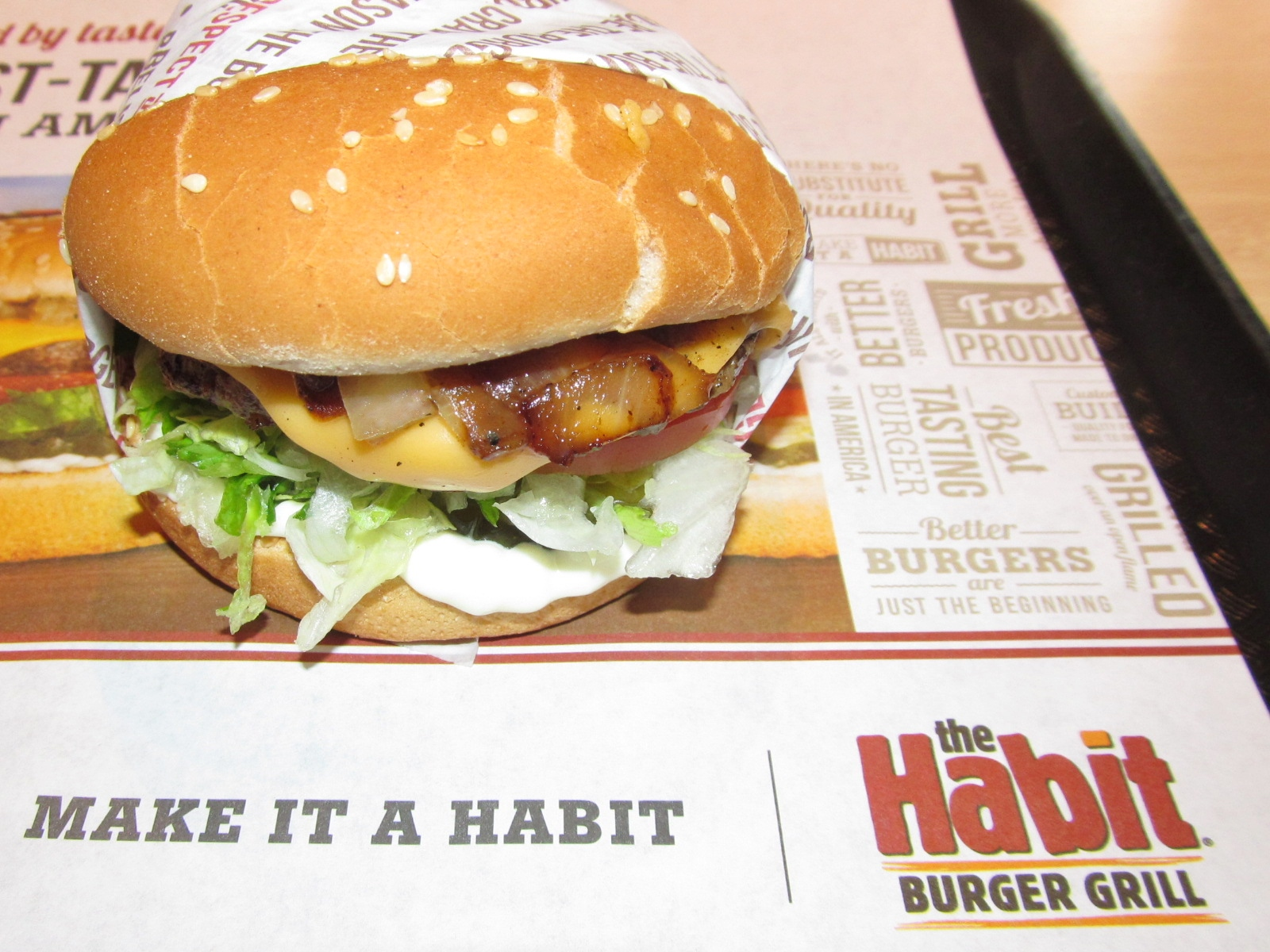
Habit Burger Grill Charburger with Cheese

The Habit Restaurants, LLC, doing business as Habit Burger & Grill, is a fast casual restaurant chain based in Irvine, California, specializing in chargrilled hamburgers. The company sells typical fast-casual fare.

In March 2020, Yum! Brands, the parent company of KFC and Taco Bell, acquired The Habit Burger Grill.

== History ==
The Habit Burger Grill was founded on November 15, 1969, in Santa Barbara, California, as a family-owned business. It originally operated under the name The Hamburger Habit. In 1980, Brent and Bruce Reichard purchased the original location in Goleta. A second location opened in Ventura in 1997. They gradually expanded the chain to 17 units in Southern California.

In 2007, KarpReilly, a private equity firm, acquired a majority ownership in the company and began to rapidly expand the chain, including franchising. Not included in the sale were eight locations in Santa Barbara County, California, which remained under the ownership of the Reichard brothers.

In 2014, Habit had 109 locations either operating or under construction, including an expansion location in Seattle. At the time, the company was one of the fastest-growing fast food chains in the United States, with a 40% sales increase from 2012 to 2013. In November 2014, the company raised $83.7 million in an initial public offering. The share price immediately doubled. By 2016, growth had slowed significantly, in line with the burger business. In 2017, the company announced plans to expand into the United Kingdom with 30 restaurants.

In March 2020, Yum! Brands, the parent company of KFC, Pizza Hut, Taco Bell, and WingStreet, acquired Habit. The brothers decided to retire and sell their remaining restaurants to Yum! Brands in 2021. The operations shifted in March 2022.

In July 2024, the restaurants switched soft drinks, as a result of Yum! Brands' acquisition, from Coca-Cola to Pepsi. On August 28, 2024, the company renamed its restaurant chain to Habit Burger & Grill.

== Reception ==
In mid-2014, The Habit's "Charburger" was named the best burger in America by Consumer Reports, a nonprofit organization dedicated to independent product testing, scoring an 8.1 out of 10 among 53,745 participants.

== Animal welfare ==
In 2021, Yum! Brands, with close to 50,000 locations globally across its KFC, Pizza Hut, Taco Bell, and The Habit Burger Grill brands, released a global policy to transition to 100% cage-free eggs in the majority of its locations by 2026, and globally by 2030.

== See also ==
- List of hamburger restaurants
