= Pasta Bravo =

Fast casual restaurant

Pasta Bravo, Inc.
- Type: Wholly owned subsidiary
- Industry: Fast casual restaurant
- Founded: Irvine, California (1988)
- Defunct: 2011
- Headquarters: Aliso Viejo, California (United States)
- Number of locations: 16
- Key people: Tim Aspel, Founder
- Products: Pastas, gourmet pizzas, and salads
- Parent: Yum! Brands
- Website: pastabravo.com (Archived)

Pasta Bravo was a fast casual restaurant of Irvine, California. At its height, Pasta Bravo operated 16 restaurants throughout the Orange and San Diego counties.

== History ==
Pasta Bravo was founded by Tim Aspel in 1988, at The Crossroads Center in Irvine. Some of the meals were Meat Lasagna and Chicken Parmigiana in addition to more contemporary offerings such as Chicken Basil Cream and Greek-Style Shrimp and Arugula. Pasta Bravo soon gained popularity and expanded to a total of 16 restaurants in Orange and San Diego counties.

In August 2002, Pasta Bravo and Yum! Brands agreed to test co-branded Bravo/Pizza Hut restaurants. In 2003 Yum! acquired the Pasta Bravo concept from Pasta Bravo, Inc. for $5 million ($8.8 million today), intending to pair it with Pizza Hut. The first freestanding Pizza Hut/PastaBravo was opened in Clarksville, Tennessee by franchisee Carreca Enterprises Inc.

After the deal with Yum!, the Pasta Bravo chain was closed within eight years. When the last restaurant closed, in December 2011, Aspel remarked, "The future wasn't in what I was doing anymore. Over the years, people's tastes ha[d] gone from carbs to proteins." Three months later, Aspel switched to a grilled seafood concept with locations of Spike's Fish House.

== See also ==
- List of defunct restaurants of the United States
