= East Dawning =

Chinese fast food restaurant chain

East Dawning Dong Fang Ji Bai
- Native name: 东方既白
- Type: Subsidiary
- Industry: Restaurant
- Founded: 2004; 22 years ago
- Defunct: 2022; 4 years ago
- Headquarters: Shanghai, China
- Products: Chinese cuisine (fast food format)
- Parent: Yum China
- Website: www.dfjb.com.cn

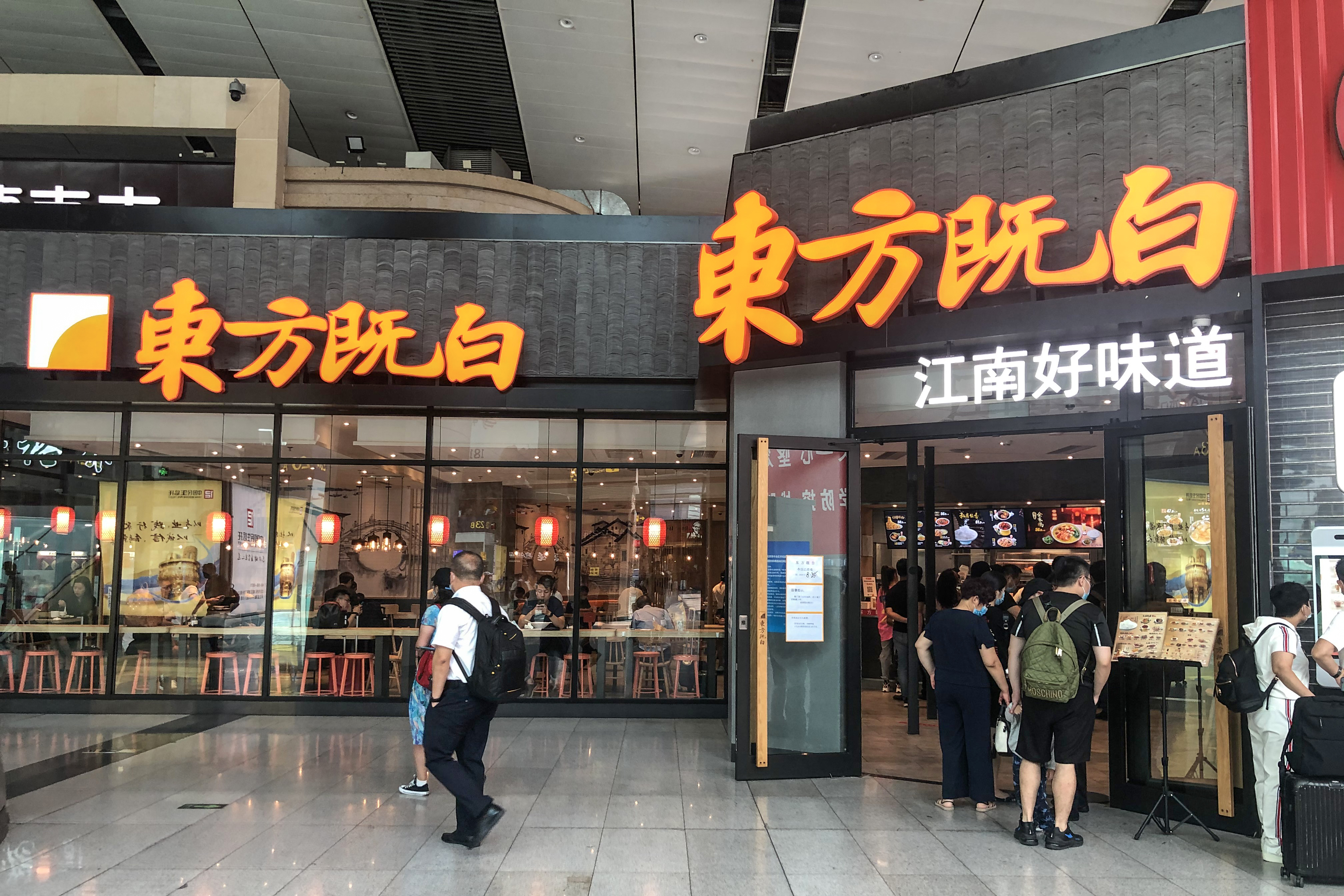
East Dawning restaurant at Beijing South railway station in 2020

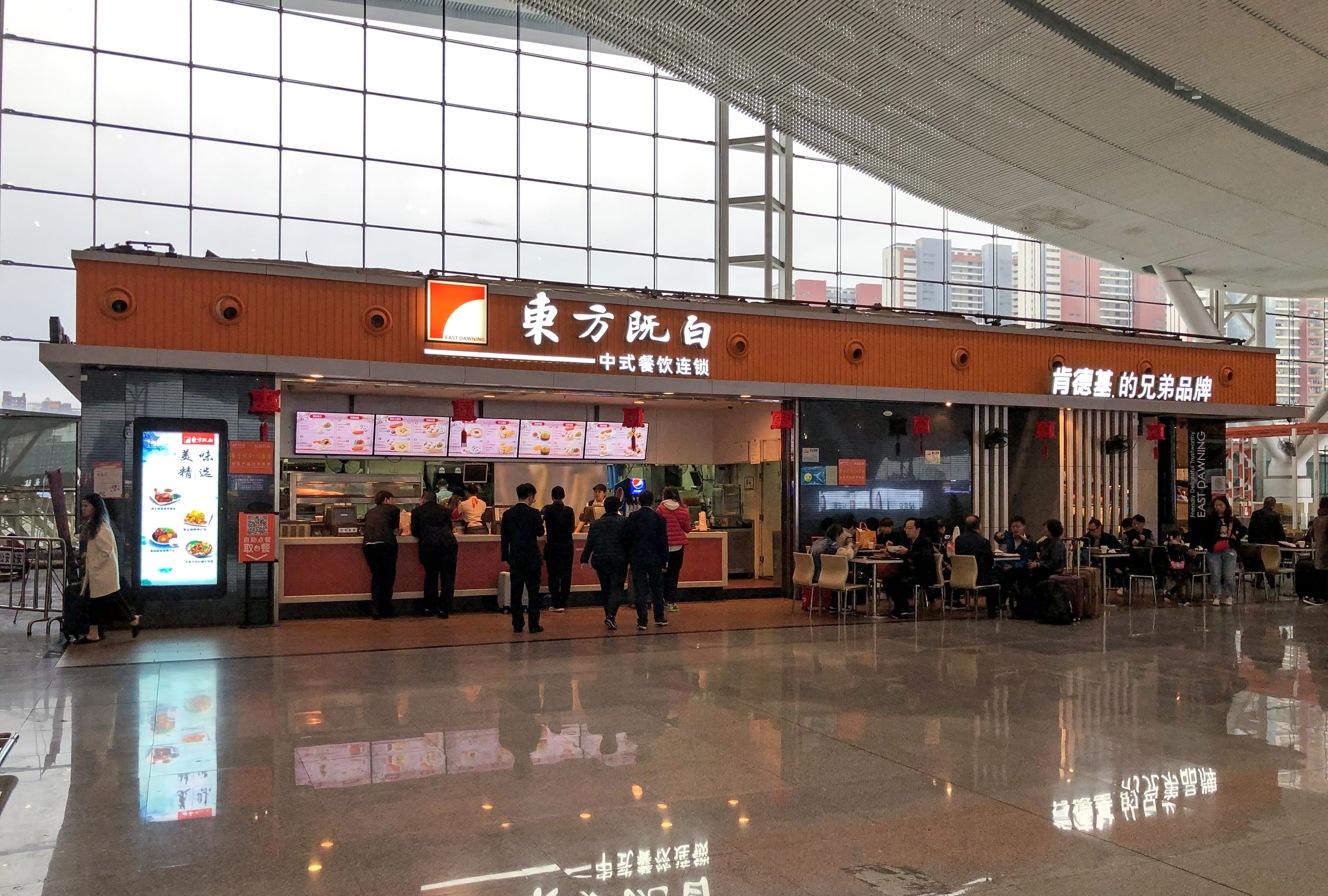
East Dawning restaurant at Shenzhen North railway station in 2019

East Dawning (Chinese: 东方既白, Dongfang Jibai) was Yum China's fusion of the KFC business model with Chinese cuisine. Chinese food was served exclusively, but the chain focused on the elements of Chinese cuisine that were more quickly and easily prepared. This excluded some dishes, such as boiled dumplings (jiaozi), but included steamed pastries such as steamed buns, including the popular xiaolongbao. Soft drinks were eschewed in favor of traditional and modern Chinese drinks such as teas (including milk tea), juices, and soy milk. However, unlike most Chinese fast food, East Dawning used consistent recipes and preparation methods between restaurants. The restaurants were designed to resemble Chinese homes; for instance, the dining tables were similar to offering tables found in many homes.

A test cafeteria-style restaurant was opened in Shanghai in 2004. After the failure of the test restaurant, Yum! Brands chose the KFC business model (KFC is the most successful Western chain in China) and found greater success. By the first quarter of 2013, there were 30 East Dawning restaurants in China. The restaurants were located in Shanghai, Beijing, Guangzhou and Suzhou. In 2016, Yum! Brands spun off their Chinese operations into Yum China, which included East Dawning. Yum China shut down the East Dawning brand in 2022.

== Name ==
The Chinese name "Dongfang Jibai" means "the East has been lit up [by the light of dawn]". It is an idiomatic expression derived ultimately from the last line of the first Red Cliffs, a narrative poem by Song dynasty poet Su Shi. The last part of the poem describes a group of friends who had so thoroughly enjoyed a dinner party on board a boat, that they "scarcely knew that the East was lit up (by the light of dawn)".

== See also ==
- List of Chinese restaurants
