= Greg Creed =

American businessman (born c. 1958)

Greg Creed (born c.1958) is an American businessman who was the CEO of Yum! Brands, from January 2015 until December 2019, when he retired, remaining on its board of directors.

He was the CEO of Taco Bell, from February 2011 until January 2015. He began as a Taco Bell executive in 2001, and began his career as a Yum! executive in 1994. Prior to that, he worked at Unilever. He holds a business degree from the Queensland University of Technology. He serves on the board of directors of the Whirlpool Corporation and Delta Air Lines.

He earned a business degree from Queensland University of Technology in Brisbane, Australia, and in 2014 he was named Alumnus of the Year.
