= Papa Gino's =

Restaurant chain based in Dedham, Massachusetts

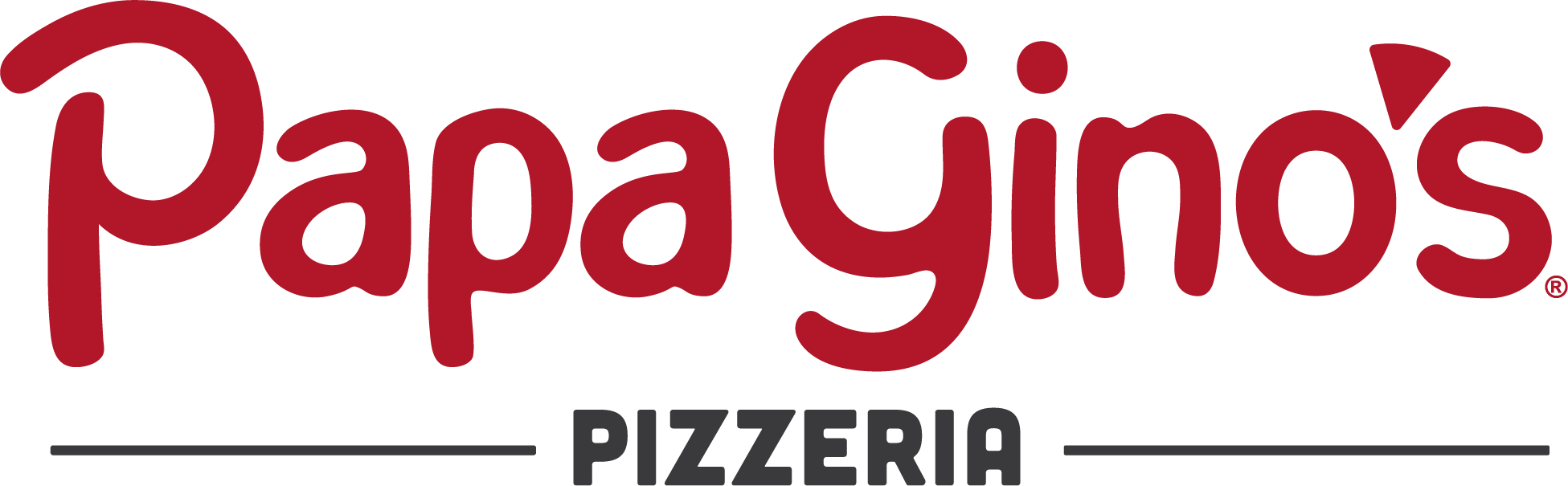

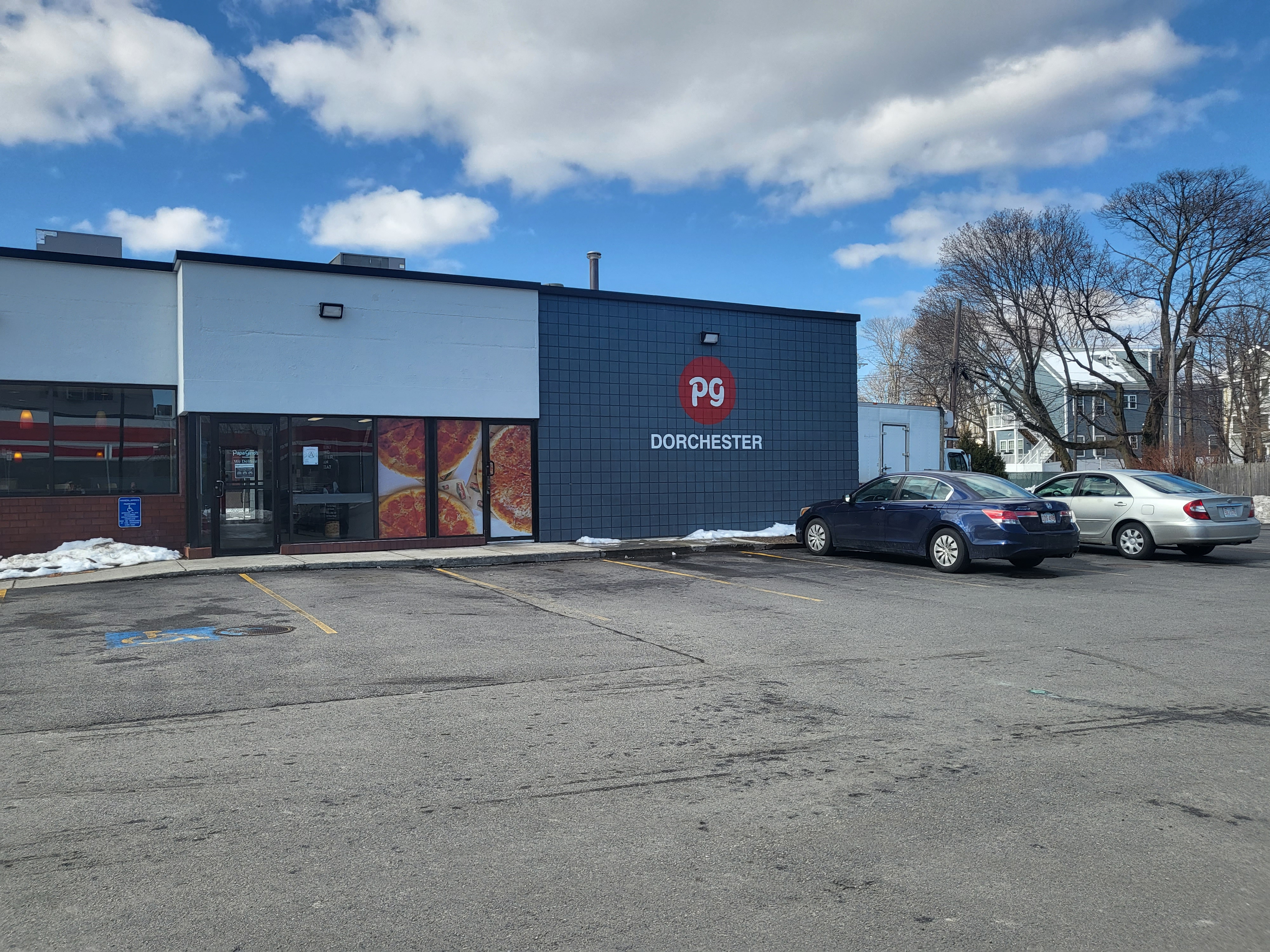
- Papa Gino's in Dorchester, Massachusetts (2021)
- Type: Private company
- Industry: Restaurants
- Founded: Boston, Massachusetts (October 23, 1961; 65 years ago)
- Founder: Michael Valerio (d. 2020)
- Headquarters: Dedham, Massachusetts, United States
- Number of locations: 79
- Area served: New England
- Key people: Tom Sterrett (CEO); Corey Wendland (CFO); Deena McKinley (CXO); Kevin Bentley (VP of Technology & Automation)
- Products: Fast food; Italian-American cuisine; Pizza; Subs; French fries; Salad; Pasta
- Revenue: 244 million USD (estimate from Zoominfo)
- Parent: New England Authentic Eats
- Subsidiaries: D'Angelo Grilled Sandwiches
- Website: papaginos.com

Papa Gino's, Inc., is a restaurant chain based in Dedham, Massachusetts, specializing in traditional thin crust pizza along with pasta, subs, salads, and a variety of appetizers. As of 2023, there are 79 Papa Gino's locations in Connecticut, Massachusetts, New Hampshire and Rhode Island.

== History ==
Papa Gino's originated in East Boston, Massachusetts as a single location named "Piece O' Pizza," which opened in 1961. In 1968, the owners, Helen and Michael Valerio, changed the name to "Papa Gino's" and began expanding the business to multiple locations, 220 when they sold the company to a group of investors in 1991.

In 1997, Papa Gino's bought D'Angelo Sandwich Shops, another Massachusetts-based fast-food outlet, specializing in sandwiches, from prior owner Yum! Brands (then known as PepsiCo Inc.'s Pizza Hut unit). A few months later, executives of a holding company, Papa Gino's Holdings Corporation (later known as PGHC Holdings), bought out the company in a deal financed by Bunker Hill Capital Partners.

=== 2018 bankruptcy ===
On September 18, 2018, Bunker Hill Capital Partners ended their investment with PGHC Holdings. On November 4, 2018, dozens of Papa Gino's locations closed abruptly, including their only location in Maine, at the Auburn Mall, bringing the chain from over 150 locations to 97. Employees were not given advance notice of the closures and were told to apply to other restaurants when they arrived for work at closed stores. The following day, PGHC Holdings filed for bankruptcy protection and announced that it had reached an agreement in principle to sell its restaurant chains to Wynnchurch Capital. The sale was finalized in February 2019.

=== Post-bankruptcy ===
On June 14, 2022, it was revealed that Papa Gino’s would be opening a new restaurant for the first time since it emerged from bankruptcy.

In November 2026, Craveworthy Brands CEO Gregg Najewski announced the company's intent to purchase Papa Gino's and D'Angelo from Wynnchurch Capital by the end of the year with plans to co-brand Papa Gino's with another one of its holdings, Wing It On.

== Advertising ==
Since the late 1990s, the chain has partnered with the Boston Red Sox and New England Patriots, as well as individual players with the teams such as former Red Sox designated hitter David Ortiz. Patriots linebacker Tedy Bruschi replaced kicker Adam Vinatieri as pitchman in the fall of 2006, after Vinatieri was signed by the Indianapolis Colts. In 2020, Papa Gino's continues to partner with the Providence Bruins, the Worcester Red Sox and Holy Cross. They also partner with many local kids teams in the communities that they serve.

== See also ==
- List of pizza chains of the United States
