= Hot 'n Now =

American fast food restaurant

- Type: Private
- Industry: Fast food
- Founded: 1984 in Kalamazoo, Michigan
- Founder: William Van Domelen
- Headquarters: Holt, Michigan
- Products: Hamburgers; French fries; Soft drinks; Milkshakes; Fried chicken
- Owner: HNN Holdings

Hot 'n Now is an American fast-food restaurant. Founded in 1984, the chain once grew to more than 150 locations throughout the United States at its peak. Subsequently, under the ownership of PepsiCo, the chain filed for bankruptcy in 2004, and was then sold to STEN Corporation. As of October 2025, the company operates two locations, both in Michigan. The majority of the chain's locations focused entirely on drive-thru service, featuring a small-footprint building with a tall, slanted roof style. Some previous locations were more traditional fast-food locations, complete with seating, and others were combined with gas stations.

== History ==
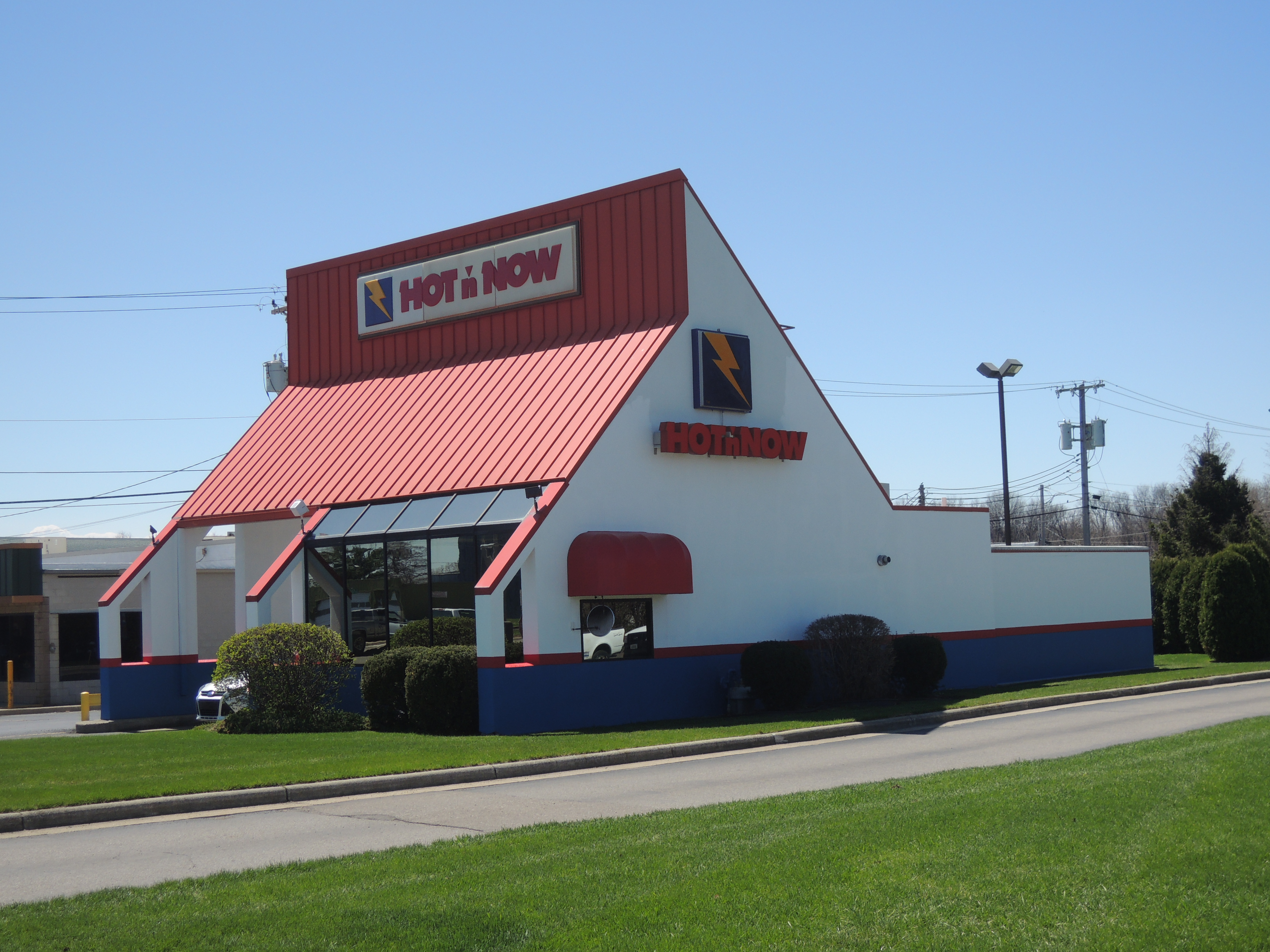
Hot 'n Now structure in Sturgis, MI (2014)

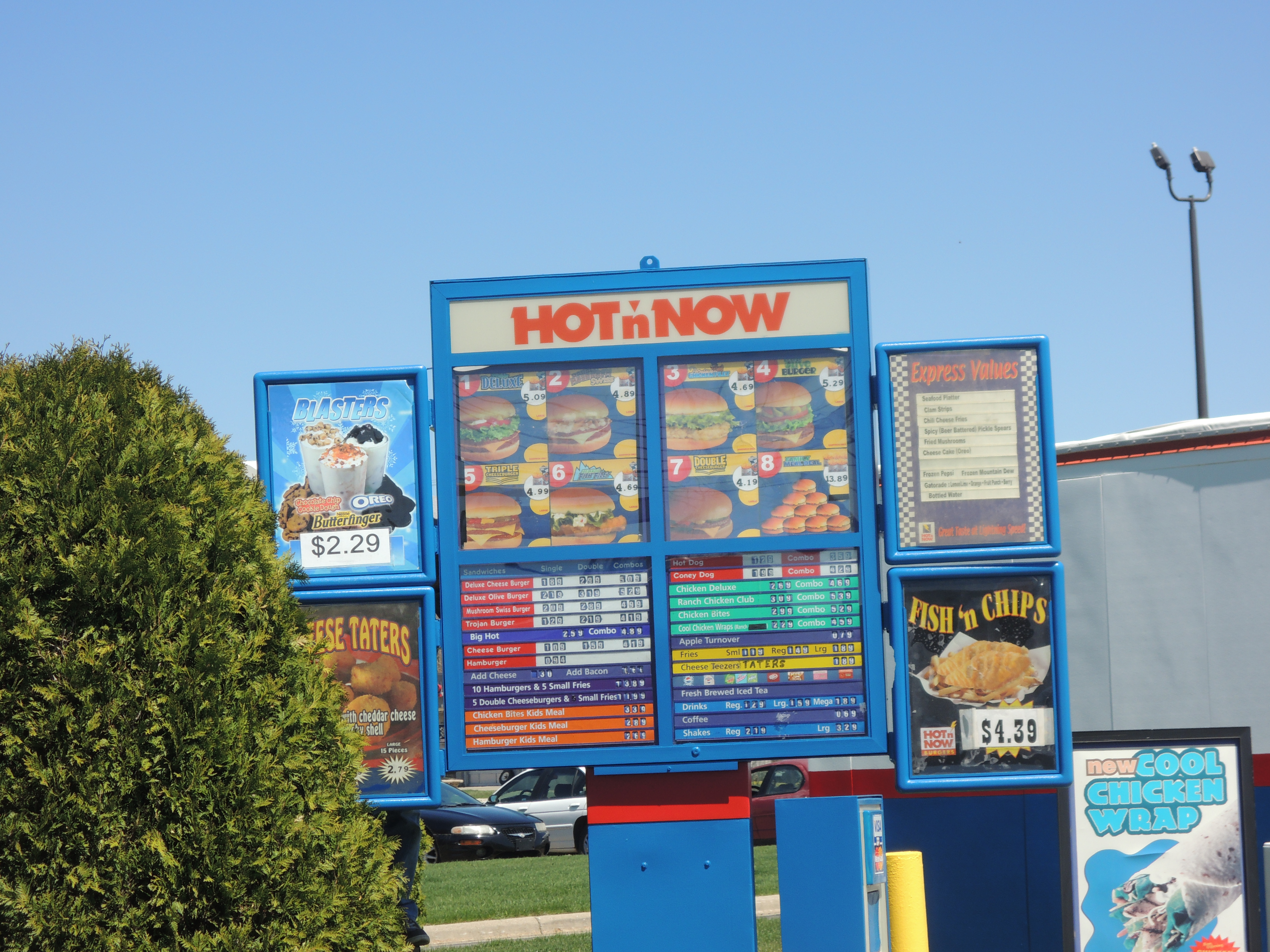
Drive-thru menu at the Sturgis Hot 'n Now (2014)

Hot 'n Now was founded in Kalamazoo, Michigan in 1984 by William Van Domelen. Van Domelen had opened the first Michigan Wendy's restaurants and was a franchisee of Burger Chef in Southwest Michigan.

By 1990, the chain operated more than 100 stores in 15 different states, having grown rapidly due to the success of its simplistic operation and 39 cent price for hamburgers, fries, and soda - substantially less than what competitors charged. That same year, it was acquired by PepsiCo, which placed operations under its Taco Bell unit. Van Domelen resigned from the company soon after the sale.

The company began making changes to the chain's concept that frustrated the franchisees, starting in 1992 with the menu. Hot 'n Now President Don Pierce left the company in 1993. Support to franchisees declined soon thereafter. Hot 'n Now was treated as a test brand. In the first quarter 1995, the company closed 80 corporate owned stores with the expectation to sell all the corporate owned locations to franchisees or licensees.

Richard Loehr, an automobile dealership owner, purchased a franchise for Broward County, Florida, in January 1990. By the end of 1995, Loehr had five locations, but he wanted out. Hot 'n Now would not buy his locations after initially showing interest and blocked any sale to other parties. After 1993 profits for Loehr's locations dropped. Loehr laid off all 300 employees and closed his six locations by March 1995. On March 16, 1995, Loehr filed a lawsuit against Taco Bell. The case went to trial in December 1998.

Taco Bell sold Hot 'n Now to a Connecticut company in 1996. By 2002, the company was based in Holt, Michigan, with 53 locations. The company closed a handful of locations. The company started an El Toro-branded Mexican menu to be co-located with Hot 'n Now; two such locations opened in January 2002.

In October 2003, Proquest Capital Corporation acquired Hot 'n Now assets and some liabilities from Hot 'n Now, LLC. Proquest was soon renamed to Hot Brands, Inc. At the time of acquisition, the chain had 44 locations (23 corporate and 21 franchisee owned), in three states: Michigan, Wisconsin, and Indiana.

In 2004, the company filed for Chapter 11 bankruptcy and was then sold to STEN Corporation, which also owns the Burger Time chain. Burger Time was sold to BTND, LLC, which owned the Hot 'n Now name.

After one of the last two locations, which was in Bay City, Michigan suffered a fire on September 5, 2016; Only the Sturgis, Michigan, location remained, though Hot 'n Now's popular Olive Burger and cheesy tots are still on the menu at the Bay City location, now known as Burger 81.

Jeff Konczak of Alpena, Michigan, along with Gun Lake Investments of Grand Rapids, Michigan, bought the rights to Hot 'n Now in October 2024. Through a partnership known as HNN Holdings, Konczak announced plans to open new Hot 'n Now locations in Alpena and Grand Rapids in 2025. The first such location was announced for opening in Wayland, Michigan in October 2025. Wayland, Michigan's location opened for business on October 13, 2025.

== See also ==
- List of hamburger restaurants
