= Burger Time =

Regional American chain of nine fast food restaurants

BTND, LLC
- Trade name: Burger Time
- Type: LLC
- Traded as: Nasdaq: BTBD
- Industry: Fast food
- Founded: August 1987; 39 years ago
- Headquarters: West Fargo, North Dakota
- Products: Fast food, including hamburgers, french fries, and milkshakes.
- Parent: BT Brands Inc
- Website: Official website

Burger Time is a regional chain of drive-through fast food restaurants that is headquartered in West Fargo, North Dakota. Its original restaurant was founded in Fargo, North Dakota in 1987. As of July 2025, the company operates 7 locations in Minnesota, North Dakota, and South Dakota.

== History ==
Burger Time's first location opened in Fargo, North Dakota, in August 1987, and it quickly opened more locations upon its initial success. The company was initially privately owned. Doug Geeslin, a Fargo-based investor, purchased the company from its founder. In 2004, Sterion, a medical devices company later renamed Sten Corporation, purchased Burger Time from Geeslin. Sten was controlled by Gary Copperud, president of CMM Properties, and CEO Kenneth Brimmer, a former president of Rainforest Cafe. On April 29, 2007, Sten sold Burger Time to BTND LLC, a Colorado limited liability company owned by Copperud and Jeffrey A. Zinnecker and accepted all liabilities. The duo resigned from Sten's board of directors. As of September 2024, in addition to operating Burger Time, the company operates several other restaurants in the Midwest, Florida, and Massachusetts. In the fourth quarter of 2024, BTND LLC sold its ownership in the brand Hot 'n Now.

== Types ==
Burger Time primarily operates outdoor restaurants which offer only drive-through or walk up service. There is typically an outdoor seating area available as well as extra parking for customers who wish to eat in their vehicles.

== Products ==
The company's menu includes hamburgers, french fries, soft drinks, and other typical fast food fare, sold in combinations or a la carte. Their signature item is the "Bigger Burger", a 1/3 pound flame broiled burger. Burger Time also purveys barbecue pulled pork and chicken sandwiches as well as apple pie. The "Bigger Burger" combo accounts for 80% of a typical location's sales.

== See also ==
- List of hamburger restaurants
