= D'Angelo Grilled Sandwiches =

American sandwich restaurant chain

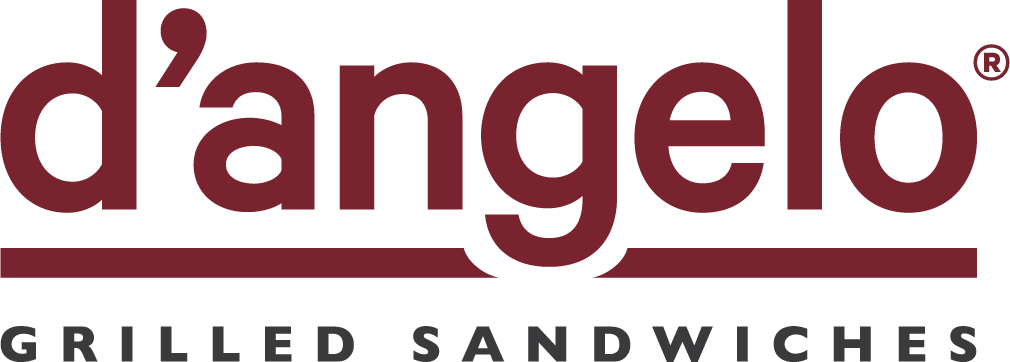
- Industry: Restaurants, Franchising
- Founded: Dedham, Massachusetts (1967; 59 years ago)
- Headquarters: Dedham, Massachusetts
- Number of locations: 83
- Key people: Tom Sterrett – CEO, Corey Wendland – CFO, Deena McKinley – CXO, Kevin Bentley – VP of Technology & Automation
- Products: Sandwiches, rice & grain bowls, lobster rolls, salads, wraps, soups
- Revenue: $244 million (estimate from Zoominfo)
- Parent: New England Authentic Eats
- Website: dangelos.com

D'Angelo Grilled Sandwiches is an American chain of 83 neighborhood-style sandwich shops found in Massachusetts, New Hampshire, Maine, Rhode Island, and Connecticut. D'Angelo Grilled Sandwiches was founded in Dedham, Massachusetts in 1967. It serves various kinds of grilled and deli sandwiches, rice and grain bowls, lobster rolls, grilled topped salads, wraps, and hot soups. The company's grilled sandwich Number 9 was called "the finest fast-food sandwich in the land" in a Bloomberg News column.

== History ==
In March 1967, 21 year-old Brian J. McLaughlin and Jay Howland opened "Ma Riva's Sub Shop" in Dedham, Massachusetts. They later changed the name to Angelo Sub Shop, and the letter D was added around 1978, supposedly standing for "delicious." The name change was to avoid any confusion with Angelo supermarkets. D'Angelo sold salads, Syrian pocket bread, and sub sandwiches. Their most popular sub was the steak and cheese sandwich.

D'Angelo owned Liberty Bakery which baked and delivered all the bread to each store. They also owned a Progressive Foods distribution center which delivered all the food to each store every week. Later, they added a USDA meat processing plant to shave the 50,000 pounds of steak consumed each week.

Beginning in the mid-1980s, many of the D'Angelo locations were co-branded and the store footprints were reworked to include full service Steve's Ice Cream counters. This was later changed to Chip's ice cream.

In 1993, PepsiCo bought D'Angelo with the intent to grow the chain into a national brand alongside its other properties, such as Taco Bell, Pizza Hut, and Kentucky Fried Chicken; however, this plan never came to fruition. The chain had 173 locations at the time.

PepsiCo eliminated D'Angelo's Chip's ice cream shortly after purchasing the chain. Some restaurants replaced the Chip's ice cream add-on with a full service Pizza Hut add-on. Some locations also integrated a Honey Dew Donuts add-on.

In August 1997, Papa Gino's Holdings Corporation acquired D'Angelo from Tricon Global Restaurants (then known as PepsiCo Inc.'s Pizza Hut unit). The sandwich chain had 203 locations at that time.

On November 4, 2018, numerous locations were abruptly shut down as part of the parent company's bankruptcy. In February 2019, the company was sold to Wynnchurch Capital and operates under the name New England Authentic Eats, LLC.

In January 2020, Tom Sterrett was appointed president and CEO of New England Authentic Eats LLC, parent to D’Angelo and Papa Gino's. On November 2, 2021, D’Angelo announced that it would be resuming expansion plans for the first time since it emerged from bankruptcy. Some locations now are a hybrid of both D'angelo and Papa Gino's, serving food of both restaurants.

In November 2026, Craveworthy Brands CEO Gregg Najewski announced the company's intent to purchase D'Angelo and Papa Gino's from Wynnchurch Capital by the end of the year.
