= List of pancake houses =

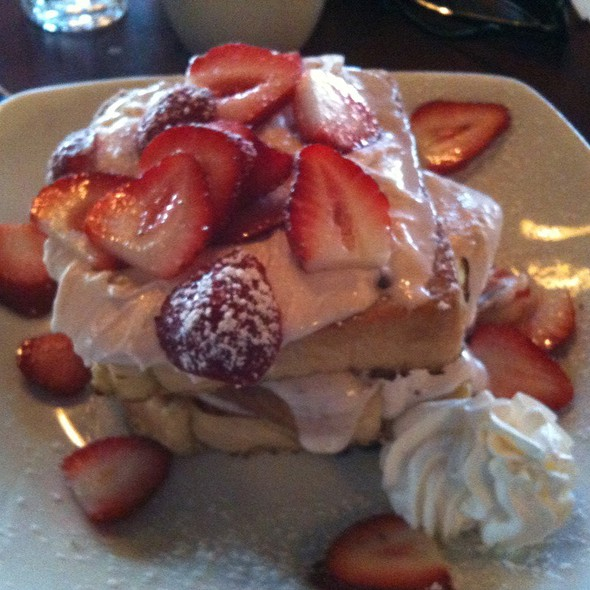
Honey Jam Cafe stuffed French toast

This is a list of notable pancake houses. A pancake house is a restaurant that specializes in breakfast items such as pancakes, waffles, and omelettes, among other items. Many small, independent pancake houses, as well as large corporations and franchises, use the terminology in their establishment names.

== Pancake houses ==
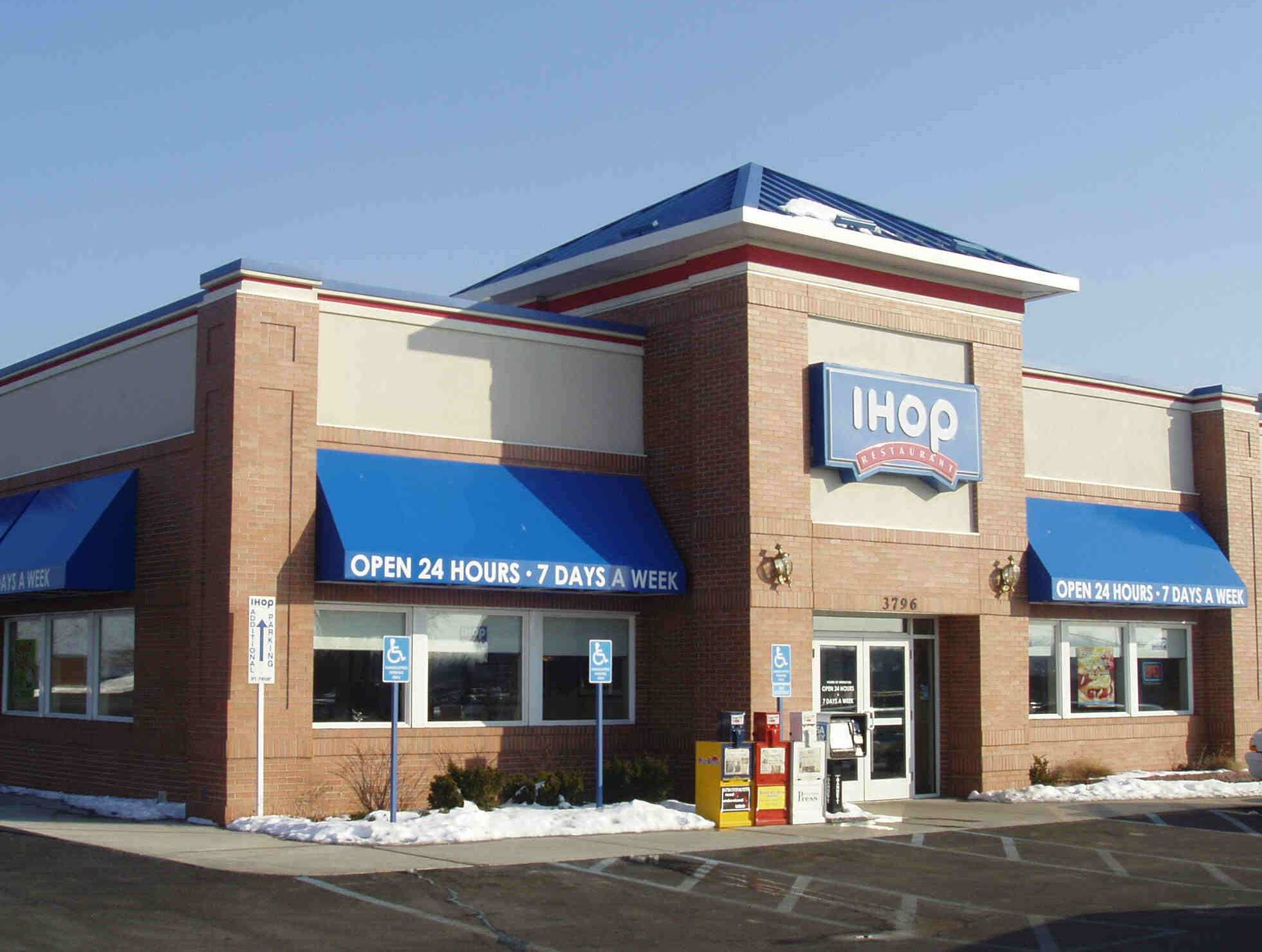
An IHOP in Poughkeepsie, New York

International chains are listed in the country in which they were founded.

=== Australia ===
- Pancake Parlour
- Pancake Manor
- Pancakes on the Rocks
- Pancake Kitchen
- Pancake Diner

=== Canada ===
- Cora
- Ricky's All Day Grill
- Smitty's

=== Mexico ===
- The Pancake House, Puerto Vallarta

=== United States ===
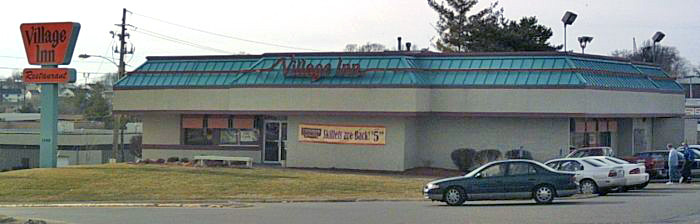
A Village Inn restaurant in Des Moines, Iowa (now closed, now Primos Tex Mex Bar & Grill)

- Bickford's
- Black Bear Diner
- Bob Evans Restaurants
- Cracker Barrel
- Denny's
- Du-par's
- Eat'n Park
- Golden Nugget Pancake House
- Hash House a go go
- Honey Jam Cafe
- Huddle House
- IHOP
- The Original Pancake House
- Pamela's Diner
- Perkins Restaurant and Bakery
- The Royal Canadian Pancake Houses
- Toddle House
- Village Inn
- VIP's
- Walker Bros.
- Waffle House

== See also ==
- List of breakfast drinks
- List of breakfast foods
- List of breakfast topics
- Lists of restaurants
