= Publicity stunt =

Planned event to gain the attention of mass media

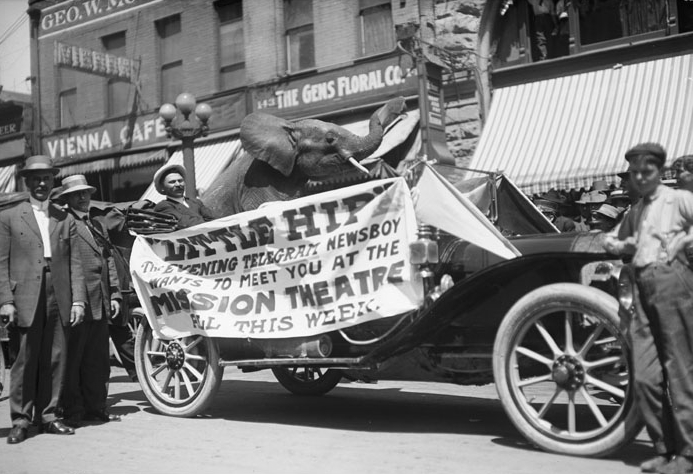
Publicity stunt in Salt Lake City, 1910: "Little Hip" the elephant, advertising newspaper and theater.

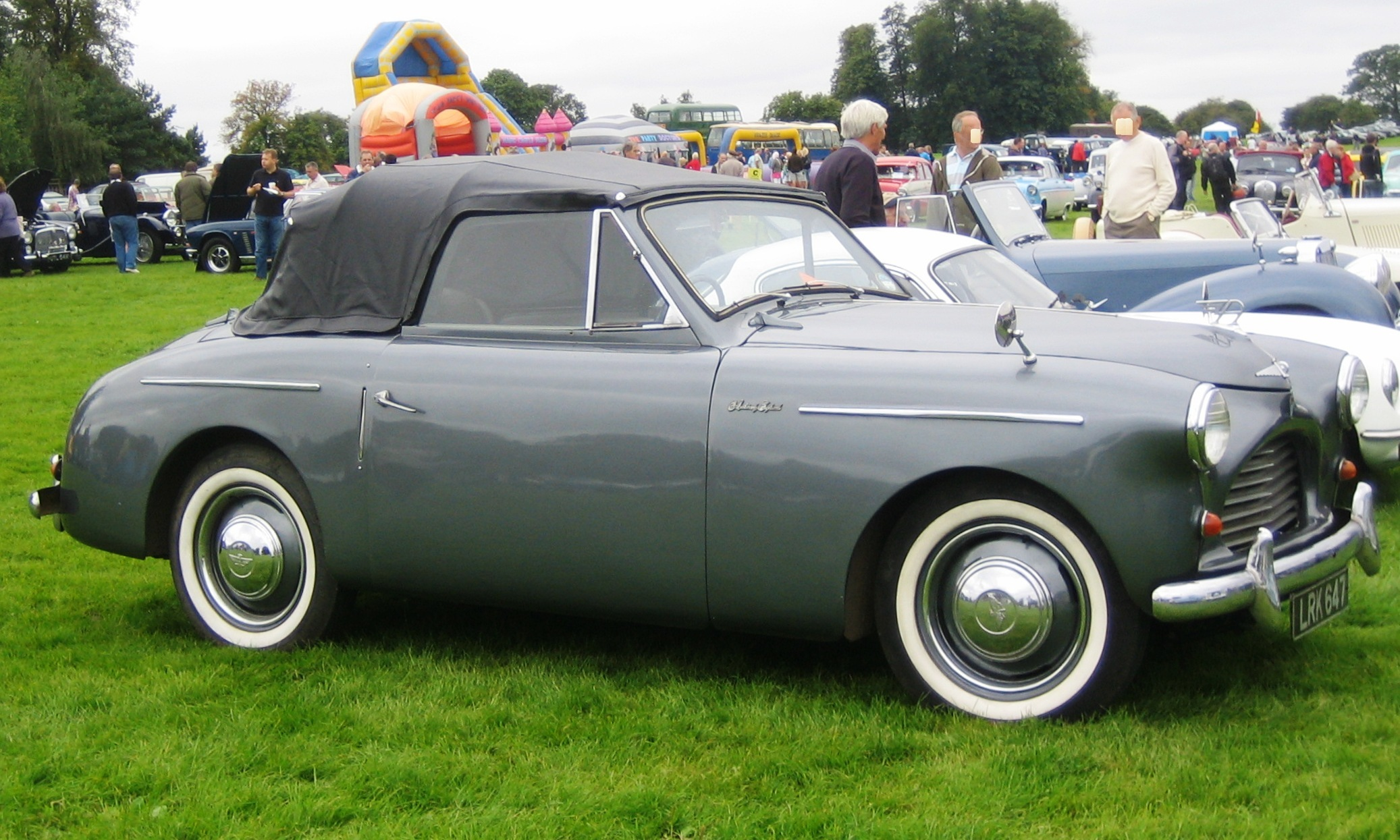
Austin A40 Sports, c. 1951. To promote the A40 Sports, Leonard Lord, Chairman of Austin, bet Alan Hess of the company's publicity department that he could not drive round the world in 30 days in the car. In 1951, an A40 Sports driven by Hess achieved the round-the-world feat in 21 days rather than the planned 30 (with assistance of a KLM cargo plane) – though the stunt had no eventual impact on sales.

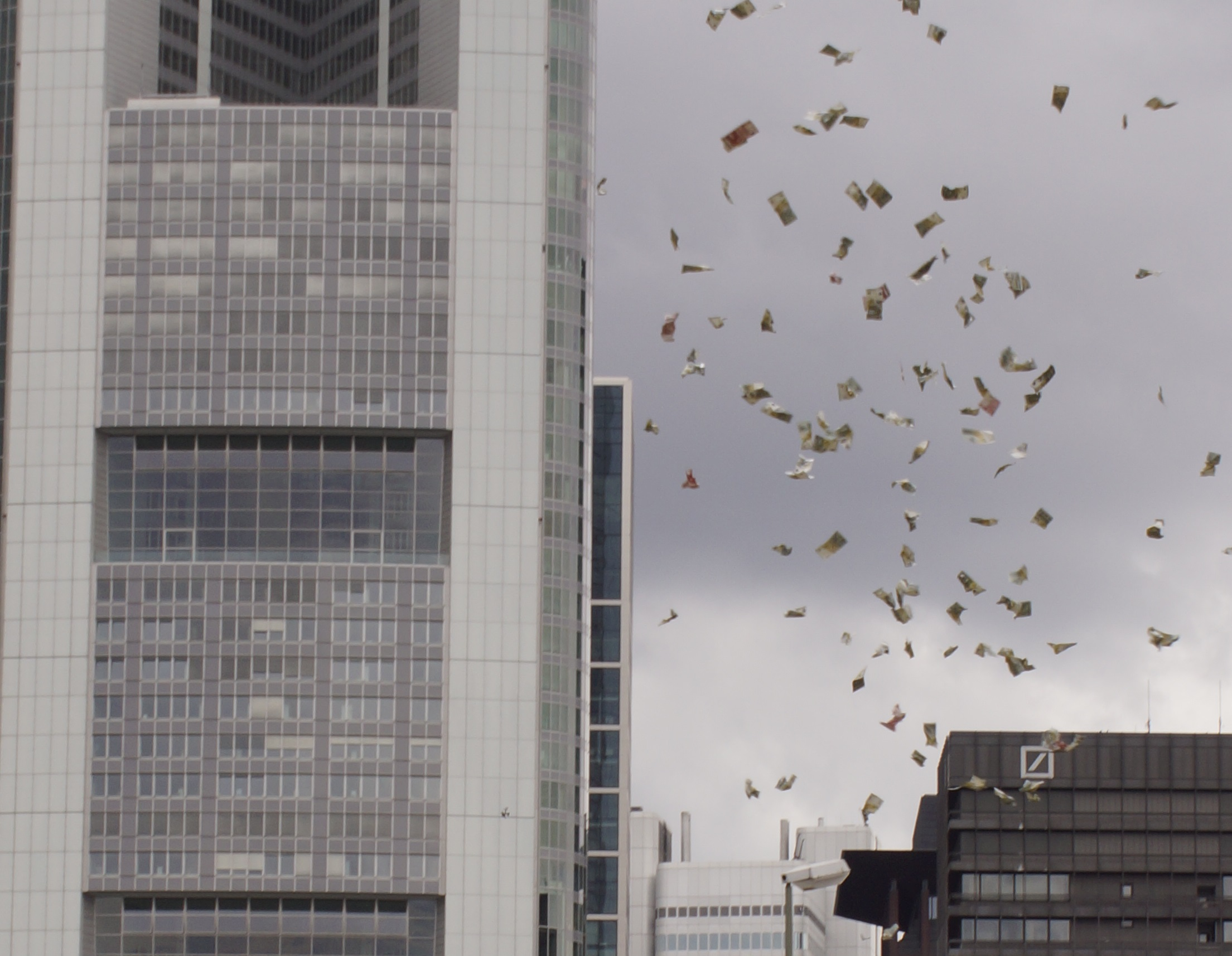
In 2013 in several large German cities, Planet Earth Account Community Enterprise (PEACE) organized events where money was distributed to the public via a balloon.

In marketing, a publicity stunt is a planned event designed to attract the public's attention to the event's organizers or their cause. Publicity stunts can be professionally organized or set up by amateurs. Such events are frequently utilized by advertisers and celebrities, many of whom are athletes and politicians. Stunts employing humor and pranks have been regularly used by protest movements to promote their ideas, campaigns, and challenge their opponents.

Organizations sometimes seek publicity by staging newsworthy events that attract media coverage. They can be in the form of groundbreakings, world record attempts, dedications, press conferences, or organized protests. By staging and managing these types of events, the organizations attempt to gain some form of control over what is reported in the media. Successful publicity stunts have news value, offer photo, video, and sound bite opportunities, and are arranged primarily for media coverage.

It can be difficult for organizations to design successful publicity stunts that highlight the message instead of burying it. A publicity stunt may generate long-lasting effects for the subject of the stunt, so it is a tool that comes with both advantages and disadvantages. The importance of publicity stunts is to generate news interest and awareness for the concept, product, or service being marketed.

== Notable examples ==
=== JP Morgan and Ringling Brothers ===
In 1933, J.P. Morgan Jr. was summoned to appear before Senate Banking and Currency Committee due to their suspicions of his previous banking activity throughout the financial crash. During the congressional hearings, U.S. Senator Carter Glass remarked that the proceedings had turned into a circus as things had begun to appear out of hand. The Ringling Brothers as well as Barnum & Bailey Circus were both in Washington D.C. at the time of the hearing. Thus, they interpreted Senator Glass' remarks as an invitation and asked their press agent to place a female circus dwarf named Lya Graf on Morgan Jr.'s lap during one of the hearings. While the addition of the small lady surprised Morgan and infuriated Glass, it generated significant publicity for the Ringling Brothers Circus.

=== Calendar Girls ===
In 1999, a group of 11 women from the Women's Institute (in Yorkshire, UK) stripped for a calendar to raise money for the Leukaemia Research Fund. Setting a goal of $5,000, the group of Women's Institute women feared that they would struggle to sell even a 1,000 copies. The calendar was eventually released on April 12, 1999, and featured all 11 women posing nude – obscured by baked goods, flower arrangements, sewing adornments, teapots, song sheets, and even a grand piano. Despite leaving people stunned at the time, over 800,000 copies of the calendar were sold worldwide. After its initial release in 1999, the calendar raised over 5 million euros or over 4.8 million U.S dollars. This publicity stunt eventually went on to inspire a multitude of media productions including a British comedy film, titled Calendar Girls in 2003, a West End show in 2009, and a musical production in 2012, titled The Girls. Tricia Stewart, one of the original calendar girls, also known as Miss October, even went on to publish her own autobiography, Calendar Girl, in which she retells the initial creation of the publicity stunt and how it changed their lives forever.

=== IHOP and "IHOb" ===
In 2018, American restaurant chain IHOP, an acronym for International House of Pancakes, briefly changed their name to IHOB, or International House of Burgers. The stunt aimed to promote the restaurant's new burger menu. A spokeswoman for the company told The Washington Post that the stunt was intended to "get people talking about, and thinking differently about, IHOP", which was primarily known as a pancake house that served only breakfast. The company changed their name back to IHOP that same month. The name change helped IHOP sell four times more burgers compared to before.

== Impact ==
Publicity stunts serve as a divisive tool in marketing that has the ability to generate positive attention, or bring considerable risk that can lead to long-term reputational damage.

=== Positive effects ===
Stunts are efficient at capturing immediate public attention, bypassing traditional advertising bombardment and immediately differentiating the company, cause, or event. Stunts also have a high likelihood of providing a return-on-investment since they generate revenue from unpaid advertisements as news outlets report on the event. Successful stunts can directly lead to an immediate increase in financial earnings. Bold stunts can frame a brand as innovative and confident, standing out amongst the crowded market.

One instance of tangible positive effects from a publicity stunt is how on January 14, 2025, three days before the second season of the television show was to air, the Apple TV+ show Severance hosted a quiet display in a glass box at Grand Central Station in New York where actors in work clothing sat at office tables with old data processors, mimicking the show's setting. Actors Adam Scott, Britt Lower, Patricia Arquette, Tramell Tillman, and Zach Cherry attended the display in-character while Severance's director and executive producer Ben Stiller appeared alongside them to capture footage of the stunt. The short pop-up gained traction on social media with favorable responses, sparking excitement for season two of the hit show. Season two of Severance premiered on January 17, 2025, garnering 589 million minutes viewed in the US over all its existing episodes on Nielsen, with 28% contributing to the season 2 opening in its premiere week.

=== Negative effects ===
Studies on provocative publicity stunts have shown that they primarily elicit negative emotions, leading to a negative association with the subject of the stunt. Primarily relying on stunts as a marketing tactic can lead to consumers perceiving the brand as a "publicity tactician" instead of a legitimate undertaking. Stunts that touch on sensitive social issues including race and culture can lead to extensive consumer boycotts and dissatisfaction as shown by Balenciaga's controversial teddy bear advert.

==== Journalists and publicity stunts ====
Historically, journalists have had some contempt for publicity stunts, viewing them as fakes that weaken the public's confidence in journalism, making it difficult for journalists to write and report authentic, truthful news stories. While journalists hold publicity stunts and stories created by public relations (PR) specialists in disdain, journalists have also been historically reliant on PR material to generate news.

== See also ==
- Edward Bernays
- Guerrilla marketing
- Hoax
- Photo op
- Media circus
- Media prank
- Stunting (broadcasting)
- Viral marketing
- Pseudo-event
