= The Original Pancake House =

American chain of pancake houses

- Type: Private
- Industry: Restaurants
- Genre: Casual dining
- Founded: 1953; 73 years ago in Portland, Oregon, U.S.
- Founders: Les Highet; Erma Hueneke
- Headquarters: Portland, Oregon, U.S.
- Number of locations: 146 (2023)
- Areas served: United States, Japan and South Korea
- Key people: Ronald Highet (President)
- Products: Breakfast dishes
- Website: originalpancakehouse.com

The Original Pancake House (TOPH) is a chain of pancake houses across the United States. They also have franchises in Canada that started in 1958 and are still operating. They have recently expanded into both Japan and South Korea. They follow traditional recipes and ingredients for their pancakes, but offer other standard diner fare, as well. They also have a spin-off, Walker Bros. Pancake House, which has a similar menu, but with a formal ambiance.

== History ==
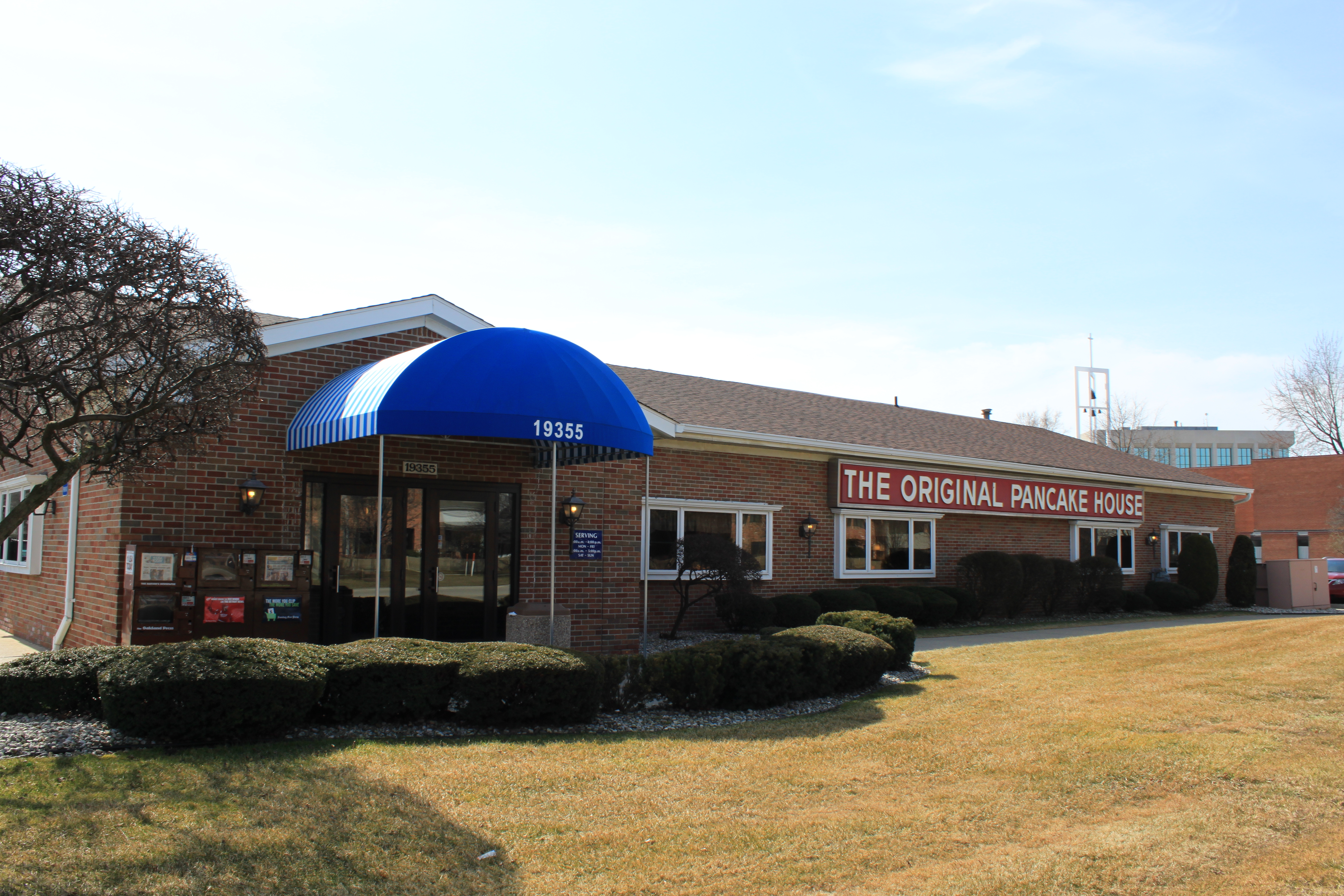
"The Original Pancake House" restaurant in Southfield, Michigan

The first Original Pancake House opened in 1953 in Portland, Oregon, by Les Highet and Erma Hueneke, who collected recipes for their restaurant from around the world. They soon franchised the name and recipes into locations spanning more than half of the U.S. states and Winnipeg, Manitoba.

Known for their breakfast foods, their signature dishes are the apple pancake, Dutch baby, German pancake, and omelettes. They have over 100 franchised locations throughout the United States; they were once located in Seattle as well as Edgewater, New Jersey, Wilmette, Illinois Williamsville, New York, and Honolulu. Its headquarters are in Portland. One of the earliest franchised restaurants opened in Anaheim, California, in 1958, and is currently owned by the family of employees from the original Portland location.

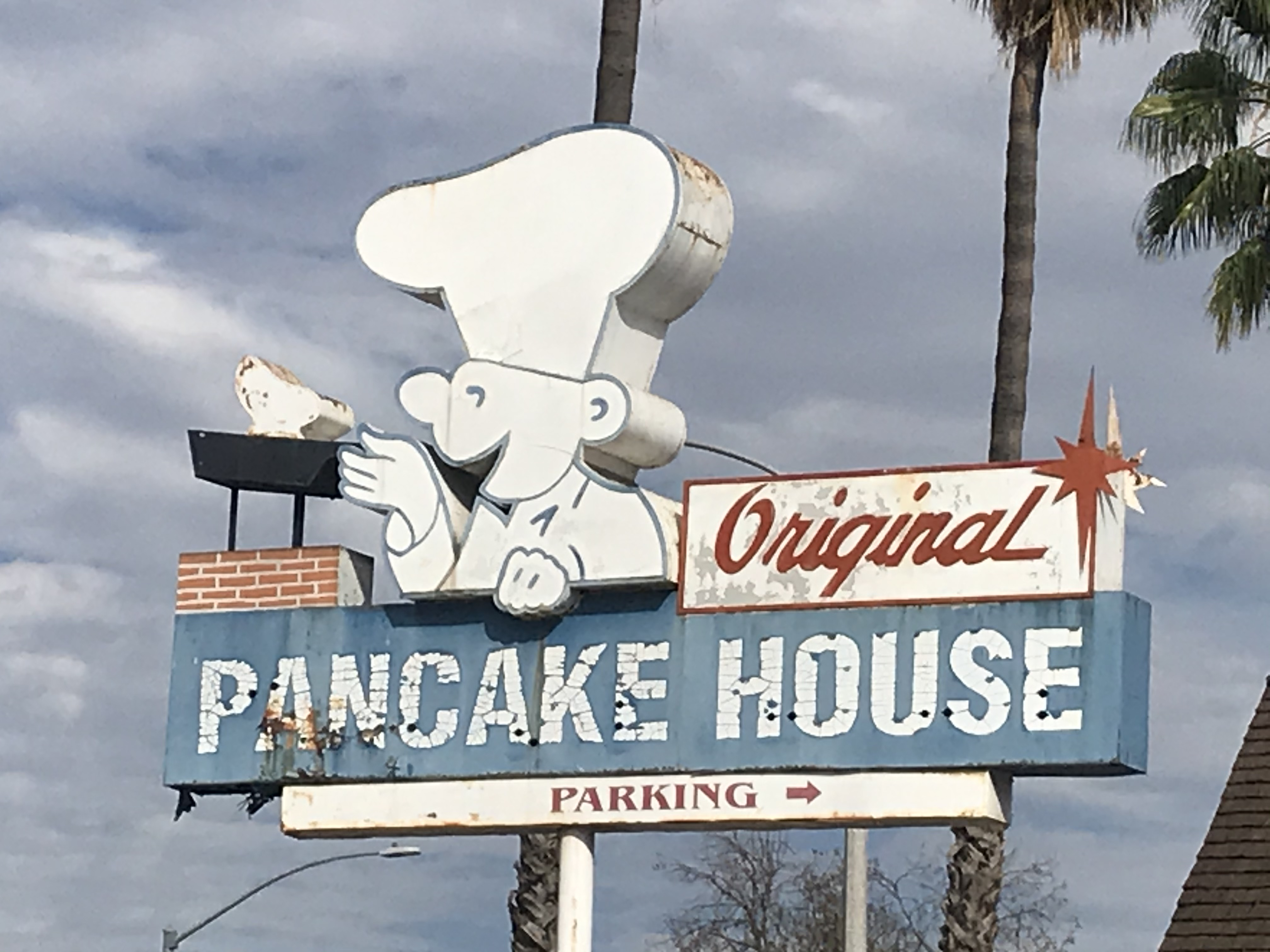
Sign outside of the Original Pancake House in Anaheim, California

In 1999, the Original Pancake House in Portland received a James Beard Foundation Award as an American Classic. OPH was also named one of USA Today's Top 10 Pancake Restaurants in the Nation according to the company website, and the Hyde Park, Chicago, location was well known as Chicago Mayor Richard M. Daley's favorite breakfast eatery. On one occasion, he conducted an interview in the restaurant with anchorman Walter Jacobson.

The chain, which expanded to Canada in 1959, spread further internationally in May 2013, when it opened its first overseas location in Seoul, South Korea. A month later, it expanded to Kichijōji, Tokyo, in Japan.

== Locations ==
The Original Pancake House is located in 29 states, with stores in most of the major metropolitan cities, including Austin, Atlanta, Dallas, Miami, Chicago, Seattle (formerly), Denver, and Charlotte. A complete list of locations can be found on the website.

The Winnipeg franchisee at one point had only one restaurant, but has recently expanded to run four restaurants in the Canadian city under the same name with a similar logo, while continuing to feature some of the chain's specialities, such as the Dutch Baby and Giant Apple pancakes.

Since spring of 2013, a store has operated in Kichijōji, Japan.

As of May 2026, there are currently 10 locations in operation in South Korea, two of which are located at USAG Humphreys.

== See also ==
- Golden Nugget Pancake House
- IHOP
- The Royal Canadian Pancake Houses
- List of pancake houses
- Waffle House
