= The Pancake House =

Restaurant in Puerto Vallarta, Jalisco, Mexico

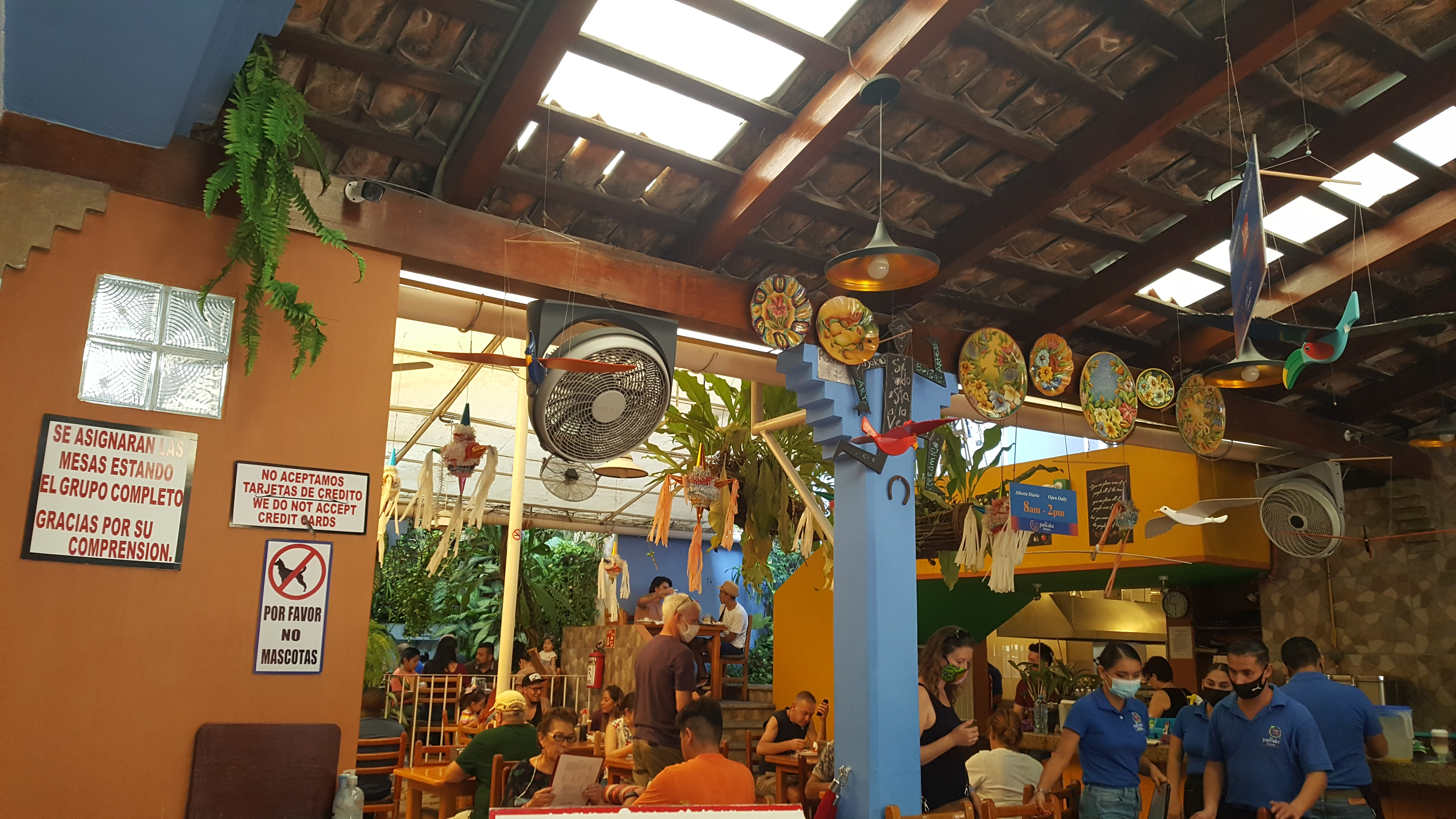
- The restaurant's interior in 2021
- Interactive map of The Pancake House

Restaurant information
- Established: 1987
- Owner: Guillermo "Memo" Barroso
- Food type: American
- Location: Puerto Vallarta, Jalisco, Mexico
- Coordinates: 20.6026°N 105.2351°W

The Pancake House (also known as Memo's Pancake House) is a pancake house in Zona Romántica, Puerto Vallarta, in the Mexican state of Jalisco. Established in 1987, the restaurant is owned by Guillermo "Memo" Barroso. According to the San Francisco Chronicle, the restaurant "appears to have a cult following".

== Description and reception ==
Most known for pancakes and waffles, the restaurant's menu also includes chilaquiles, eggs Florentine, and machaca burritos. There are 12 kinds of pancakes, including the "Oh Henry" (chocolate and peanut butter) and 8 waffle varieties. Fodor's says, "The large dining room bursts with local families on weekends and homesick travelers. It can get noisy, and service tends to slip when Memo is out of town. The draped back patio is pretty, but it's like a greenhouse when the day heats up." In The Rough Guide to Mexico, John Fisher described the restaurant as a "marquee-like affair serving good pancakes, waffles, blintzes and all-you-can-drink coffee to a tourist crowd".

== See also ==
- List of pancake houses
- List of restaurants in Mexico
