= The Royal Canadian Pancake Houses =

Pancake houses in Eastern United States

Royal Canadian Foods Corp.
- Type: Public
- Industry: Restaurants
- Founded: 1989
- Founder: Sheldon Golumbia and Beatrice Puja
- Defunct: 1998
- Headquarters: New York, New York
- Key people: Sheldon Golumbia; Beatrice Puja
- Products: Breakfast natural foods Pancakes • Waffles • French toast

The Royal Canadian Pancake Houses were moderately priced gourmet pancake houses in New York City and in the South Beach area of Miami Beach, Florida.

== Development ==
The Royal Canadian Pancake Houses were owned by Royal Canadian Foods Corp, a Delaware corporation. The first outlet opened in Tribeca in New York City, in 1989. It was followed by the opening of a second location in Midtown Manhattan. In November 1993, the founders, Sheldon Golumbia and Beatrice Puja, took it public with a micro-public offering of 250,000 shares of common stock at a sale price of $5.00/share. Subsequently, two more locations were opened in NYC, on the Upper West Side and in Gramercy. In Miami Beach, Florida, Royal Canadian Foods also opened a Royal Canadian Pancake House and a Womlette House, featuring “womlettes” (an omelet with a waffle base).

In fall 1998, Royal Canadian Foods closed all of their outlets.

== 1998Closure ==
Long before meeting Sheldon Golumbia and Beatrice Puja, and unbeknown to them, the investment banker who facilitated Royal Canadian Foods Corp micro-public offering had been under SEC investigation for ethical violations involving other companies. As the pancake houses were successful, the company kept growing in Manhattan, New York, and South Beach, Florida, with the investment banker securing growth capital through private placements. Unfortunately, the secured funds were not provided in a timely way, and oftentimes were not provided at all. Despite the success of the Royal Canadian Pancake Houses, and the good management of the chain, having to continually meet development costs commitments without access to the growth capital withheld by the investment banker, created a perpetual financial strain, as reflected in Royal Canadian Foods’ disclaimers and red inked financials. In 1998, the SEC indicted the investment banker for “participating in one of the largest stockbroking scams in history” [6], the investment banker “admitting that he was the middleman in a “pump and dump” scheme that made millions selling shares to unsuspecting investors” [6]. He was charged with market manipulation, fraud, and grave ethical violations [7] involving companies that he took public other than Royal Canadian Foods Corp, and the SEC permanently revoked his broker-dealer license. Upon the investment banker’s firm being shut down by the SEC, and since Sheldon Golumbia, and Beatrice Puja had never been investigated, or indicted by the SEC for any wrongdoings or violations of any kind, it became imperative for them to quickly cut ties with the investment banker. Consequently, Royal Canadian Foods Corp. ceased operations in the fall of 1998

== RoyalCanadian Foods Corp after 1998 ==
Once the investment banking support was gone, and the restaurants were closed in 1998, the company essentially was no longer a going concern, and became a corporate shell that stopped filing the 10-K and 10-Q reports with the SEC. Regulatory databases often list the company's status as "Revoked" simply because it failed to file these papers years later, rather than because of any misconduct by Sheldon Golumbia, Beatrice Puja, or the restaurants management team.

== See also ==
- List of pancake houses
