= Ricky's All Day Grill =

Canadian restaurant chain

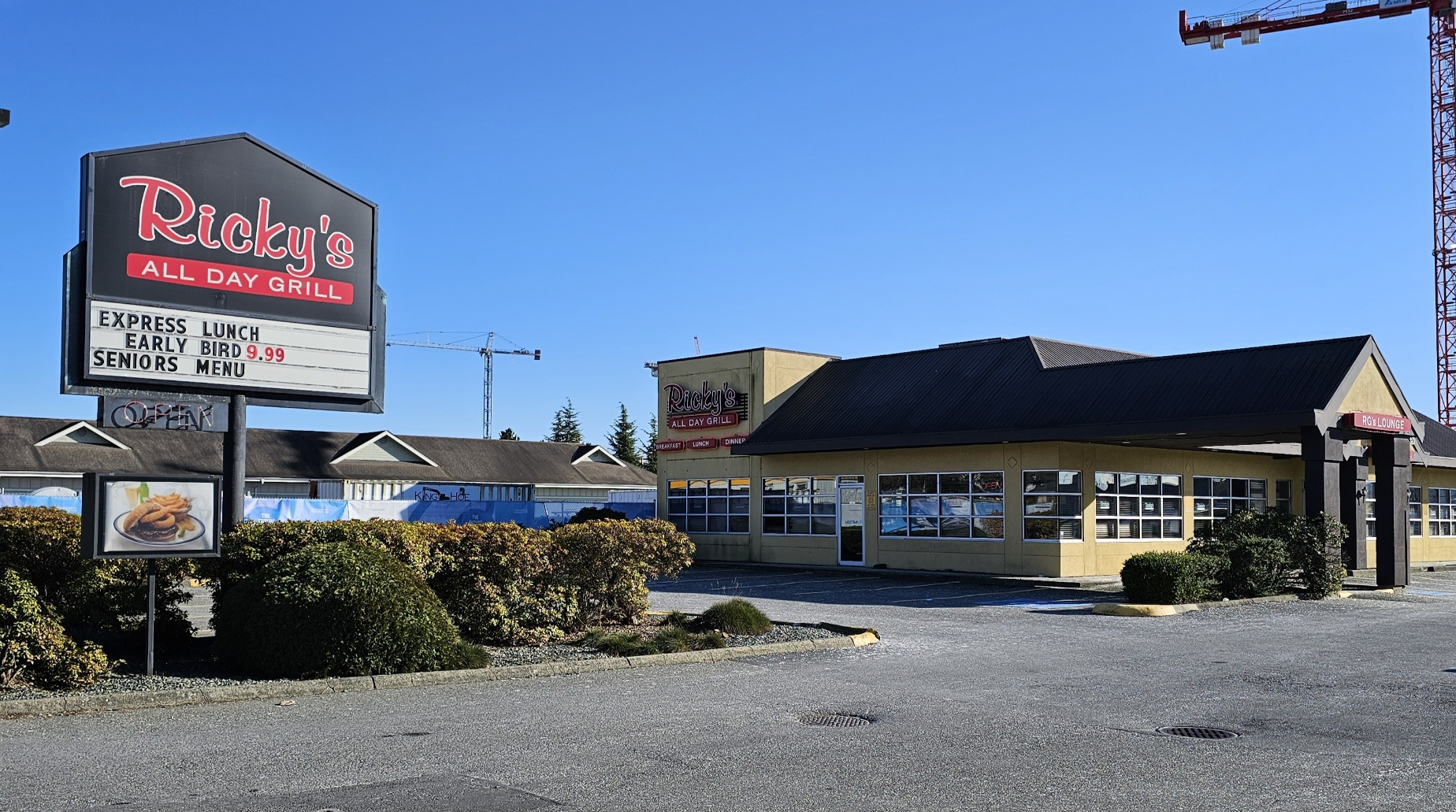
- Ricky's All Day Grill in Cloverdale, British Columbia
- Type: Franchise
- Industry: Restaurant
- Founded: 1962
- Headquarters: Burnaby, BC, Canada
- Website: www.gotorickys.com

Ricky's All Day Grill is a restaurant chain in western Canada. The restaurant was founded in 1960 as a family breakfast house. The first location in eastern Canada opened in Peterborough, Ontario in November 2007.

Ricky's serve a range of dishes for breakfast, lunch and dinner.

== History ==
Al Sheren opened the first Ricky's, naming the chain after his son, Ricky. This was Ricky's Pancake House & Chicken and it opened in the early 1960s in Park Royal Shopping Centre in West Vancouver, BC. Park Royal had just opened and it was the first indoor mall in Canada.

Roy Hildebrand bought a franchise in 1979 and became the franchisor in 1982. Roy and his family quickly expanded the chain, opening locations throughout Western Canada.

Frank Di Benedetto acquired Ricky's in 1997 as majority owner, President and CEO. Ricky's All Day Grill. Ricky's is now open for breakfast, lunch and dinner.

Ricky's All Day Grill has become one of the fastest growing mid-scale family restaurants in Canada with 70 locations.

== See also ==
- List of pancake houses
- List of Canadian restaurant chains
