= Perkins Restaurant & Bakery =

American restaurant chain

Coordinates: 35°7′41.2″N 89°56′43.8″W

Perkins LLC

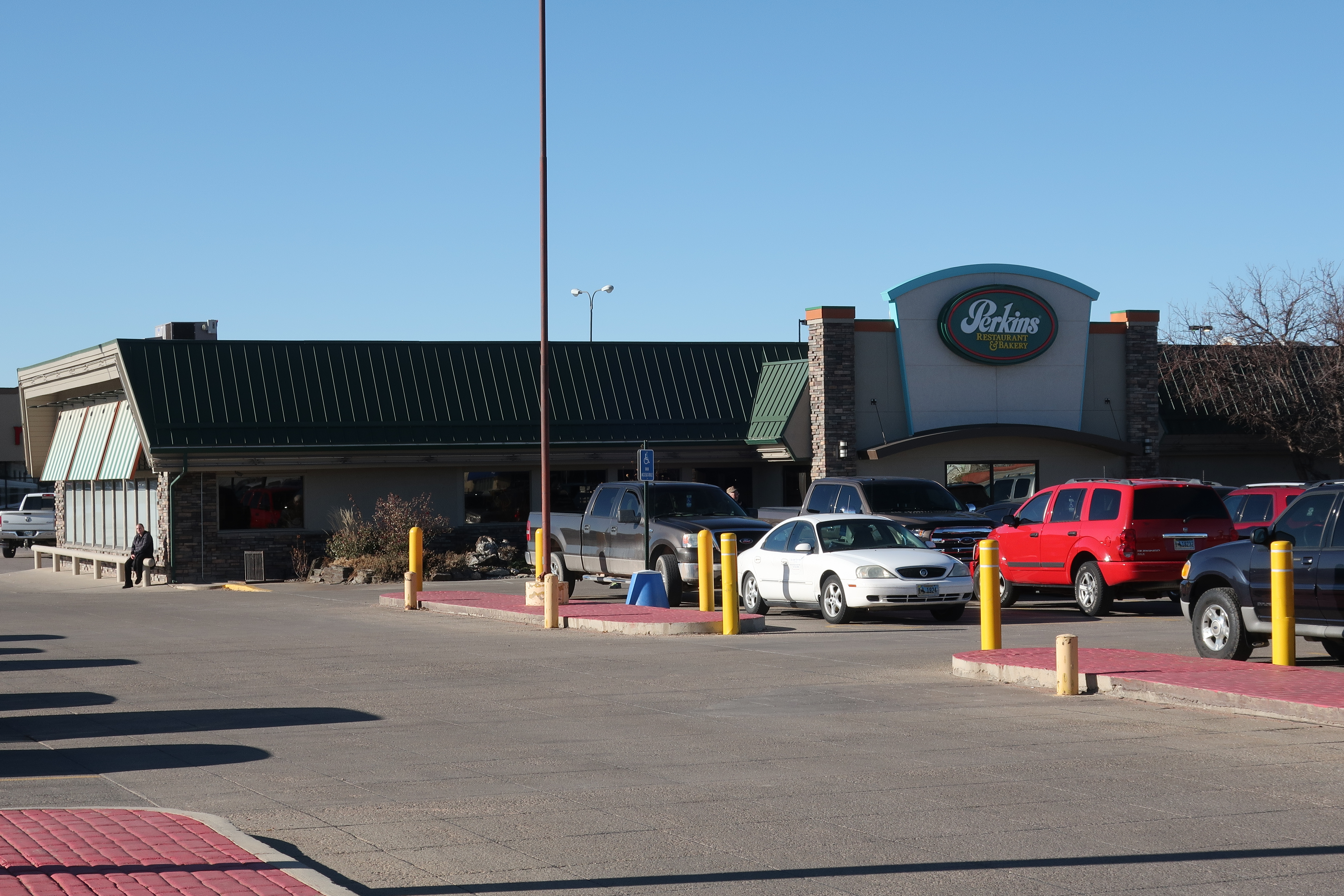
- A Perkins restaurant and bakery in Gillette, Wyoming
- Trade name: Perkins
- Formerly: Smithies Pancake House; (1957–1958); Perkins Pancake House; (1958–1969); Perkins Cake & Steak; (1969–1987)
- Type: Subsidiary
- Industry: Restaurant and Bakery
- Founded: 1958; 68 years ago Cincinnati, Ohio, U.S.
- Founders: Matt and Ivan Perkins
- Headquarters: Atlanta, Georgia, U.S.
- Number of locations: 266
- Key people: Paul Damico, CEO; Matt Carpenter, Brand President; Brian Wallunas, CTO
- Owner: Ascent Hospitality Management
- Number of employees: 10,000+
- Website: perkinsrestaurants.com

Perkins LLC (also known as Perkins Restaurant & Bakery or Perkins American Food Co. on the locations' signage) is an American casual dining restaurant chain which serves breakfast and other homestyle meals throughout the day in addition to bakery items including pies, muffins, and other sweets. As of April 2024, the company operates 265 locations.

== History ==
=== 1957−1984 ===
The Perkins chain was established in 1957, when Matt and Ivan Perkins opened Smithies Pancake House in Cincinnati, Ohio. In 1958, the chain expanded as a franchise. One franchisee in Minnesota, Wyman Nelson, introduced an aggressive advertising campaign and an expanded menu in 1967.

From 1969 to 1978, Nelson consolidated Perkins and another chain, Smitty's, into Perkins 'Cake & Steak'. From the headquarters in Edina, Minnesota, he assumed nationwide development control of the company and focused on opening over 220 restaurants. In 1979, Matt and Ivan retired, selling their remaining interest in the company including trademark and distribution rights. In August 1979, Perkins became a wholly owned subsidiary of Memphis-based Holiday Inn, and the corporate headquarters were established in Memphis, Tennessee.

=== 1985−1999 ===
In 1985, restaurant entrepreneur Donald N. Smith, who served on the board of directors of Holiday Inn, purchased an ownership interest in Perkins, becoming the chairman of the board and the company's CEO. The company was renamed Perkins Family Restaurants in 1987 and was organized into a master limited partnership with interests publicly traded on the New York Stock Exchange. The corporation expanded into Canada, opening a restaurant in Thunder Bay, Ontario. In 1990, the company began a philanthropic relationship with Give Kids the World which is headquartered in Kissimmee south of Orlando, Florida. It contributes money and meals to the charity for terminally ill children globally.

Matt Perkins died of heart disease in 1991 at age 79 and Ivan Perkins died on February 11, 1998. At the time of Ivan's death, the franchise had 462 restaurants in 32 states.

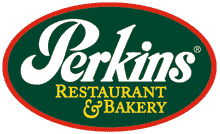
Perkins logo, 1983-2024

=== 2000−present ===
Perkins underwent business changes in the 2000s. In 2000, it merged with a wholly owned subsidiary of The Restaurant Company (TRC). In 2005, TRC was acquired by Castle Harlan, a private equity investment firm based in New York City, for approximately $245 million. In May 2006, the parent company acquired Marie Callender's, a chain of casual dining restaurants also known for their freshly baked pies combining it with the Perkins chain, forming Perkins & Marie Callender's Inc.

Perkins alternative logo, 1983-2024

In June 2011, many restaurants were closed with no notice given to customers or staff. The closures were in Colorado, Kansas, Illinois, Tennessee, Florida, Michigan, and Minnesota. Later that month, Perkins & Marie Callender's Inc. filed for Chapter 11 bankruptcy. PMCI closed 65 restaurants and laid off 2,500 workers. In the bankruptcy proceedings PMCI listed assets of $290 million and liabilities of $441 million. PMCI emerged from bankruptcy at the end of November 2011 under the control of Wayzata Investment Partners, but continued to experience difficulties. In May 2012, it was announced that all western New York Perkins restaurants, except for the Olean, New York, location, would close.

On August 5, 2019, its parent company Perkins & Marie Callender's filed for bankruptcy while announcing the closure of 29 of their under-performing restaurants. The next month, several of its locations in northern Pennsylvania closed. On September 12, 2019, it was announced that Huddle House would acquire all remaining Perkins restaurants, a total of 342 units. In May 2020, Ascent Hospitality Management, based in Atlanta, purchased Huddle House, therefore making Perkins a subsidiary of Ascent.

In March 2024, Perkins announced a partnership with ezCater to bring catering to more than 180 locations. In March of 2025, "Perkins American Food Co." opened their new restaurant in Orlando, Florida.

== See also ==
- List of pancake houses
