= Buena Park Downtown =

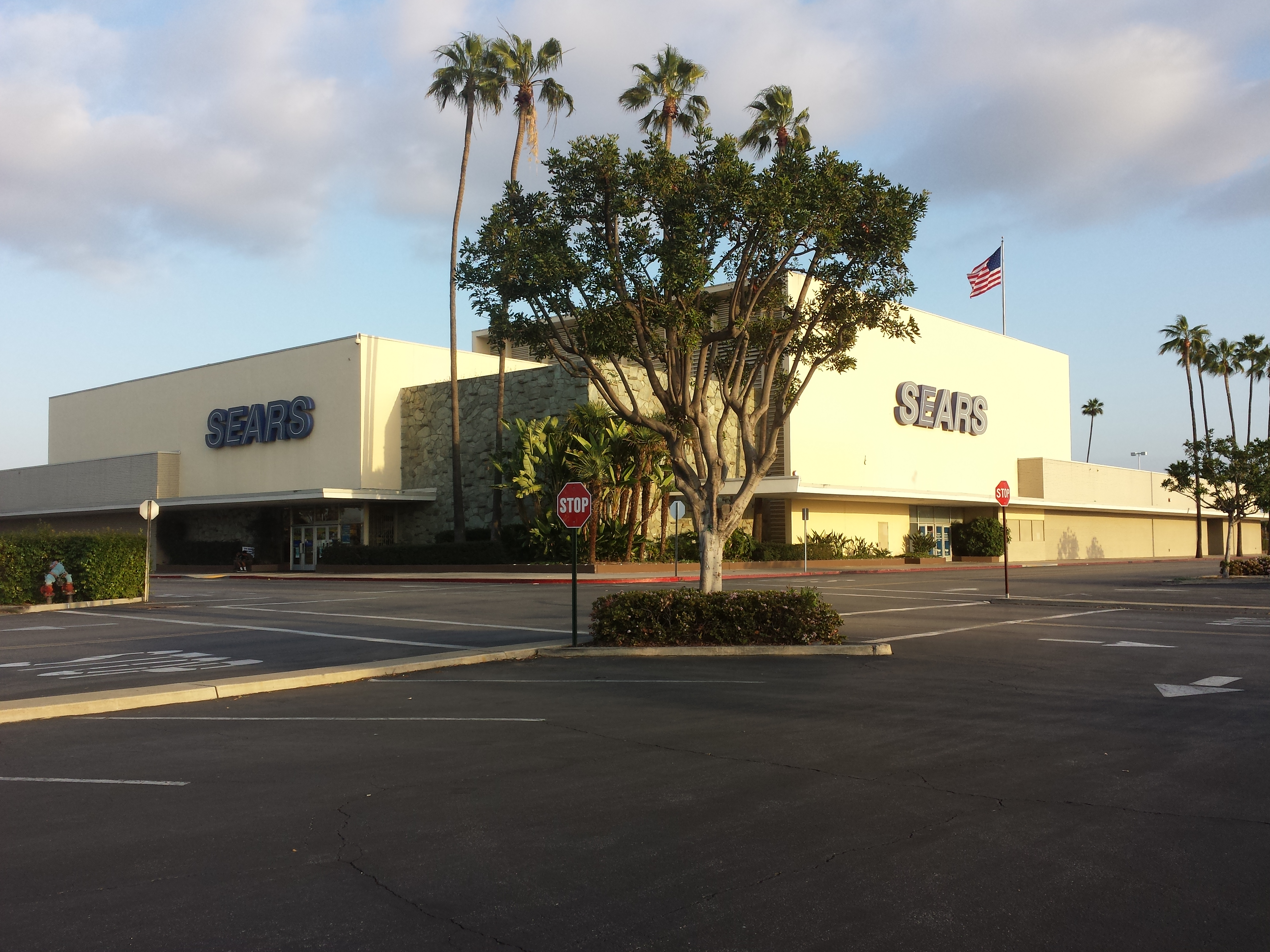
- Sears at Buena Park Downtown
- Location: Buena Park, California
- Coordinates: 33°50′43″N 117°59′22″W
- Address: 8308 On the Mall
- Opened: 1961
- Developer: John S. Griffith
- Manager: Cirrus Asset Management Inc.
- Num. of stores: 80
- Floor area: 1,100,000 square feet (100,000 m^{2})
- Floors: 2 (1 in Burlington, Ross Dress For Less, TJ Maxx, and Walmart)
- Website: https://www.visitbpd.com/

Buena Park Downtown, formerly Buena Park Mall, is an enclosed shopping mall located on La Palma Avenue in Buena Park, California, United States, near Knott's Berry Farm. As of 2007 it is the 20th largest mall in Orange County, with around 1,100,000 square feet (100,000 m^{2}) of retail space.

The mall is anchored by Walmart, DSW Shoes, Ross Dress for Less, TJ Maxx and Burlington. The Krikorian Metroplex closed its doors in January 2026. As of March, 2026, the former Sears is being demolished to construct apartments as part of a massive development to add housing to the mall grounds. Work is currently ongoing.

== History ==
Built in 1961, the Buena Park Mall was one of the first malls in Orange County, anchored by JCPenney, Sears, and May Company California (which opened in 1963). A United Artists movie theater opened in August 1984, to close in 1999; the space was converted for retail use, and became 24 Hour Fitness in 2007. May Company closed in January 1993 as one of the 12 J. W. Robinson's and May Company stores closing due to the merging of the two department stores to form Robinson's-May and in November of that same year, the closed May Company became a discount chain Fedco.

Previous tenants of the Buena Park Mall include:

Tenant name	Date opened	Date closed
Sears	1961	February 2, 2020
Bed Bath and Beyond	~2003	February 2023

The mall was neglected in the 1980s and 1990s even as the local retail market changed. In 1995 a group controlled by the Pritzker family of Chicago bought the mall for $41 million from Australia's City Freeholds, Inc., and planned a $120 million renovation.

The modernization was stalled for several years. After FedCo closed, the leaseholder sought to sublet the space to Gigante, a Mexican supermarket chain, and opposed a major renovation. Target, which had acquired FedCo in 1999, refused to allow the lease to be transferred to another discount retailer. Finally, in late 2001, the city of Buena Park itself paid $3.2 million to take over the Fedco lease and transfer it to Walmart, which now occupies the space. Completed in 2003, the renovation also replaced the former JCPenney with a new Krikorian Theaters multiplex.

Burlington Coat Factory, a later addition, closed in 2005 and was replaced with Steve & Barry's which closed in 2008. Tower Records also operated in the mall until the demise of the chain in 2007. The Chicago eatery Portillo's opened their first Southern California outlet at the mall in 2005, next to the Pat & Oscar's, along the La Palma edge of the parking lot. Steve & Barry's closed in 2009. Circuit City was formerly one of the principal stores of Buena Park Place, but closed in 2009 due to its bankruptcy.

On November 7, 2019, it was announced that Sears would be closing this location as part of a plan to close 96 stores nationwide. The store closed on February 2, 2020, making it the last original anchor store to close.

On January 10, 2023, it was announced that Bed Bath & Beyond would be closing as part of a plan to close 62 stores nationwide. Burlington was assigned to take its place, marking its return to the mall after closing 20 years ago.

In 2023, plans were announced to demolish the former Sears and build apartments on site. The new apartment complex is to be called The Village at Buena Park and to consist of 1,302 residential units compromising 1,176 apartment units and 126 townhomes. Demolition of the former Sears began in early 2026.
