= Hash House a go go =

American restaurant chain

Hash House A Go Go, Inc.

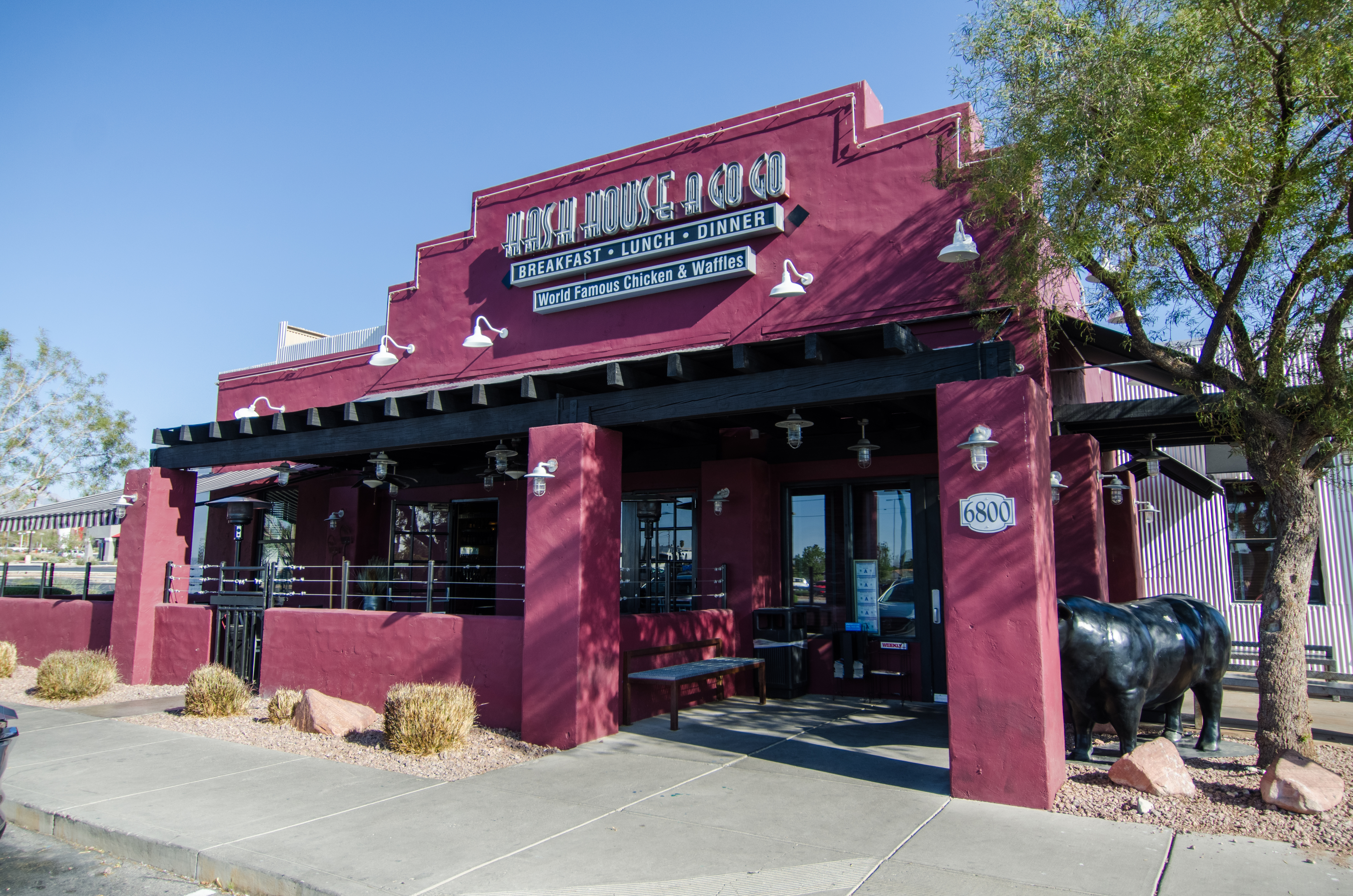
- Exterior in Las Vegas, Nevada
- Type: Private
- Industry: Restaurants
- Genre: Casual dining
- Founded: July 2000; 26 years ago
- Founders: Andy Beardslee; Johnny Rivera
- Headquarters: San Diego, California, U.S.
- Number of locations: 8 (2026)
- Key people: William Underhill (CEO & Chairman)
- Products: Breakfast items, Lunch items, Desserts
- Services: Food service
- Website: hashhouseagogo.com

Hash House A Go Go, Inc. (also stylized Hash House a go go) is an American restaurant chain founded and headquartered in San Diego, California, in July 2000. Known for large portions of breakfast food, it has additional locations in Connecticut, Florida, New Jersey, and Nevada.

== History ==
Hash House A Go Go was founded in July 2000 by Andy Beardslee and Johnny Rivera in San Diego, California.

The original location has been featured on numerous television shows, including Food Paradise, The Martha Stewart Show, Rachael Ray's Rachael's Vacation and Chefs vs. City. One of the Las Vegas locations was featured on Man v. Food. The restaurant has since expanded to Mohegan Sun, Connecticut, Orlando and Winter Garden, Florida, and Atlantic City, New Jersey.

Expansion locations in Chicago, Illinois; Plano, Texas; St. George, Utah and Moorestown, New Jersey; have closed.

== See also ==
- List of pancake houses
