= Golden Nugget Pancake House =

Chicago restaurant chain

Coordinates: 41.9323°N 87.6883°W

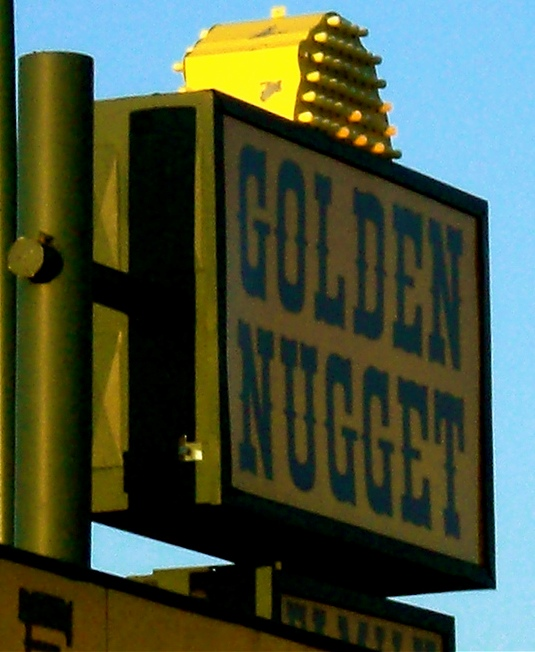
- Type: Pancake house & Casual dining
- Industry: Restaurants
- Founded: 1966
- Headquarters: United States
- Number of locations: 4 Golden Nugget Pancake House (Chicago metropolitan area) (2024)
- Key people: Howard N. Quam, Mark Golebiowski

The Golden Nugget Pancake House is a chain of family restaurants originally launched in Florida but now operating exclusively in Chicago, Illinois. Some of the restaurants serve breakfast 24 hours a day, and their decor generally has a Western motif.

== History ==
The chain was founded by Howard N. Quam, a Chicago native, who served in the US Marines and then worked as a blackjack dealer at the Golden Nugget Casino in Las Vegas. In the mid-1960s, Quam moved to Florida and opened his first restaurant, which he named in honor of the casino. He returned to Chicago in 1966 to open additional restaurants. He returned to Las Vegas in 1988, where he opened other restaurants.

As of March 2024, there are four Golden Nugget franchises in Chicago. Many other local restaurants with "Golden" in their titles, such as the Golden Apple restaurant in Lakeview, and the now-closed Golden Angel restaurant in North Center, belonged to the Golden Nugget chain in the past. Over the years, the so-called "Golden Empire" has attracted a loyal and diverse clientele and has become a familiar part of the Chicago culture. In the 1970s, local writer Jon-Henri Damski described the Lincoln Park Golden Nugget as "the biggest chicken coop in the Midwest". Later, Dodie Bellamy used a Golden Nugget as one of the settings in her 1984 short story "The Debbies I Have Known". The aforementioned Golden Apple was the subject of an episode of This American Life in 2000.

In 2000, the Irving Park Golden Nugget became the site of a local scandal when a pair of police officers allegedly stopped at the restaurant for two hours while an intoxicated 56-year-old man waited in their police wagon. The man died of asphyxiation when he fell into an awkward position in the vehicle, and the Chicago City Council agreed to pay the victim's family $1.8 million (equivalent to $3,222,017 in 2025).

== See also ==
- IHOP
- Denny's
- Walker Brothers
- Lou Mitchell's
- Waffle House
- The Original Pancake House
- List of pancake houses
