= Huddle House =

American restaurant chain

- Huddle House logo, 2024

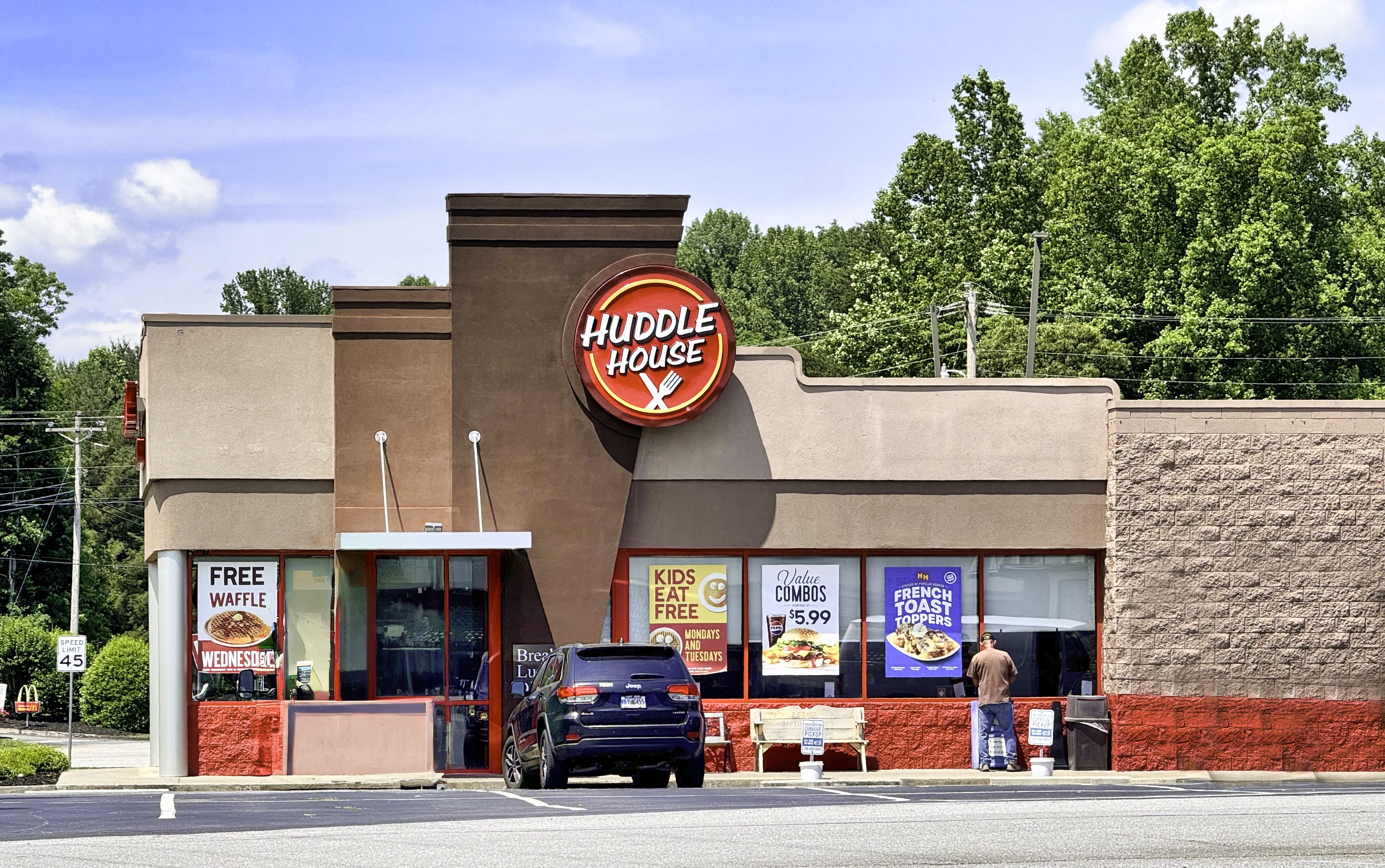
- A Huddle House in Hiawassee, Georgia
- Type: Private
- Industry: Restaurant
- Founded: April 1964; 62 years ago
- Founder: John Sparks
- Headquarters: Atlanta, Georgia
- Key people: Paul Damico, CEO; Bob Campbell, Brand President; Brian Wallunas, CTO
- Products: food service, waffles, breakfast, lunch, dinner, catering
- Owner: Ascent Hospitality Management
- Subsidiaries: Perkins Restaurant and Bakery (2019–2020)
- Website: huddlehouse.com

Huddle House, Inc. is an American casual dining restaurant chain. As of April 2026, the company operates 260 locations in 20 states.

== History ==
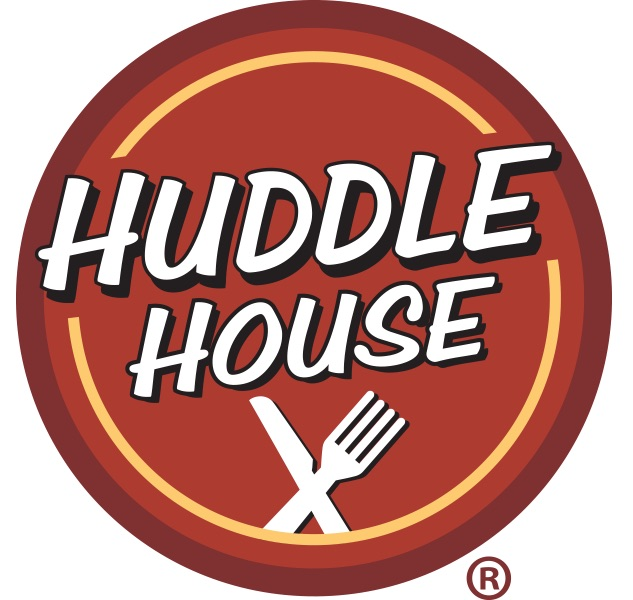
Logo used until 2024

The chain was started in April 1964 in Decatur, Georgia, by John Sparks, who at the time was a Restaurant Equipment Supplier with Waffle House being a major client. With the goal of providing a 24-hour eatery. It is named after the act of huddling in football. The original Huddle House in Decatur was established to give fans a place to eat after "the big game" on Friday nights.

In 2006, Allied Capital acquired Huddle House for $124.1 million.

In 2009, Ares Capital acquired Allied Capital.

In April 2012, Ares sold Huddle House to Sentinel Capital Partners.

In February 2018, Sentinel Capital Partners sold Huddle House to Elysium Management for an undisclosed amount.

On September 12, 2019, it was announced that Huddle House will acquire Perkins Restaurant and Bakery.

In May 2020, the ownership of Huddle House was transferred to Ascent Hospitality Management, a multi-brand holding company created by Elysium Management.

== Locations ==
Huddle House has locations in Alabama, Arkansas, Florida, Georgia, Illinois, Indiana, Kansas, Kentucky, Louisiana, Mississippi, Missouri, Nebraska, North Carolina, Oklahoma, Pennsylvania, South Carolina, Tennessee, Texas, Virginia, and West Virginia.

== See also ==
- Denny's
- IHOP
- Waffle House
