= Portillo's Restaurants =

Chicago-based fast casual restaurant chain

Portillo's Inc.
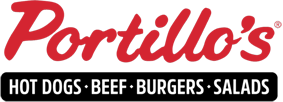
- Trade name: Portillo's
- Type: Public
- Traded as: Nasdaq: PTLO
- Industry: Restaurants
- Genre: Fast casual
- Founded: April 9, 1963; 63 years ago in Villa Park, Illinois
- Founder: Dick Portillo
- Headquarters: Oak Brook, Illinois, United States
- Number of locations: 109
- Key people: Brett Patterson (CEO)
- Products: Hot dogs; Maxwell Street Polish; Italian beef; chicken sandwiches; hamburgers; ribs; French fries; onion rings; salads; soft drinks; soft serves; milkshakes
- Revenue: ▲US$732,066,000 (2025); US$710,554,000 (2024)
- Number of employees: 7,890 (2025)
- Website: portillos.com

Portillo's Restaurant Group, Inc. is an American fast casual restaurant chain based in the Chicago area that specializes in serving Chicago-style food such as hot dogs, Maxwell Street Polish, and Italian beef. The company was founded by Dick Portillo on April 9, 1963, in Villa Park, Illinois, under the name "The Dog House".

In addition to 46 locations in the Chicago metropolitan area and Northern Illinois, the chain also has six locations each in the Phoenix metropolitan area, the Dallas–Fort Worth metroplex and Greater Houston; four locations each in central Illinois and the Indianapolis metropolitan area; three locations each in the Minneapolis-St. Paul metropolitan area, Tampa metropolitan area, and Greater Orlando; two locations each in the Milwaukee metropolitan area, Madison metropolitan area, Metro Detroit, and Southern California; and one location each in Greater San Antonio, South Bend metropolitan area, Metro Atlanta, Fort Wayne, the Quad Cities, El Paso and Tucson.

== History ==
Portillo's was founded in 1963 by Dick Portillo. After returning from serving in the Marines, Portillo gathered money from his savings and an investment from his brother Frank to open a hot dog stand. They bought a 12-foot trailer that had no restroom and no running water. They named it "The Dog House". The Dog House operated on North Avenue in Villa Park. At first the stand lost money and a solution was needed. Portillo snuck into one of the back rooms of a competitor and wrote down where they were purchasing their product. He continued the process of learning by visiting different competitors. By 1967, The Dog House, now in good financial standing, was upgraded to a larger trailer and was renamed "Portillo's". In 1970, he partnered with Harold Reskin and opened up his second location in a shopping mall that Reskin owned. Between 1972 and 1989, he opened up a second restaurant under the name "Barney's" that specialized in BBQ meals. In 1983 Portillo's opened up its first drive thru in Downers Grove. In the 90's Portillo's had profited by more than $50 million with 25 stores around the Chicago area. In 1993, he experimented with a few ideas by combining his concept stores Barney's and Barnelli's with a Portillo's restaurant. In 1994, the first Portillo's within Chicago city limits opened at the intersection of Clark and Ontario St. In 1995, Portillo opened Key Wester Fish & Pasta House in Naples, Florida. In 1996, Portillo brought the Key Wester Fish & Pasta to Naperville. In 2000, Portillo opened another concept restaurant called Luigi's House. The Portillo's chain grew again in 2010 with Honey-Jam Café.

In 2014, Portillo sold Portillo's to Berkshire Partners. The new owners are planning to open five to seven restaurants each year. Portillo has been buying the land for new sites, which he then leases back to the company.

The company filed to go public in 2021. Its initial public offering sold 28% of the company as stocks traded on the Nasdaq as of October 21, 2021, with private equity firm Berkshire Partners retaining the remainder of the ownership.

In April 2025, the chain began serving a limited-trial breakfast menu at six of its Chicago-area restaurants. Items included a Polish sausage, egg and cheese sandwich and a chocolate cake doughnut, topped with its signature chocolate cake frosting. In May of that year during Italian Beef Month, the chain announced "The Leo" available that month. Named for Cardinal Robert Francis Prevost, a native Chicagoan, after he was elected the first-ever American pope and took the name Pope Leo XIV, it featured the beef "baptized" (dipped extra) in its juices. Br. Joe Ruiz, a student of Pope Leo's who lived with him for a year, said in a WGN-TV interview that the Pope's favorite cake is the restaurant's chocolate cake.

In September 2025, shortly after Portillo's announced a "strategic reset" of the company's financial targets, Michael Osanloo stepped down as CEO. Michael Miles Jr., Portillo's board chairman, stepped in as the Interim CEO.

In February 2026, Brett Patterson, former chief executive of Miller's Ale House, was announced as the new permanent CEO.

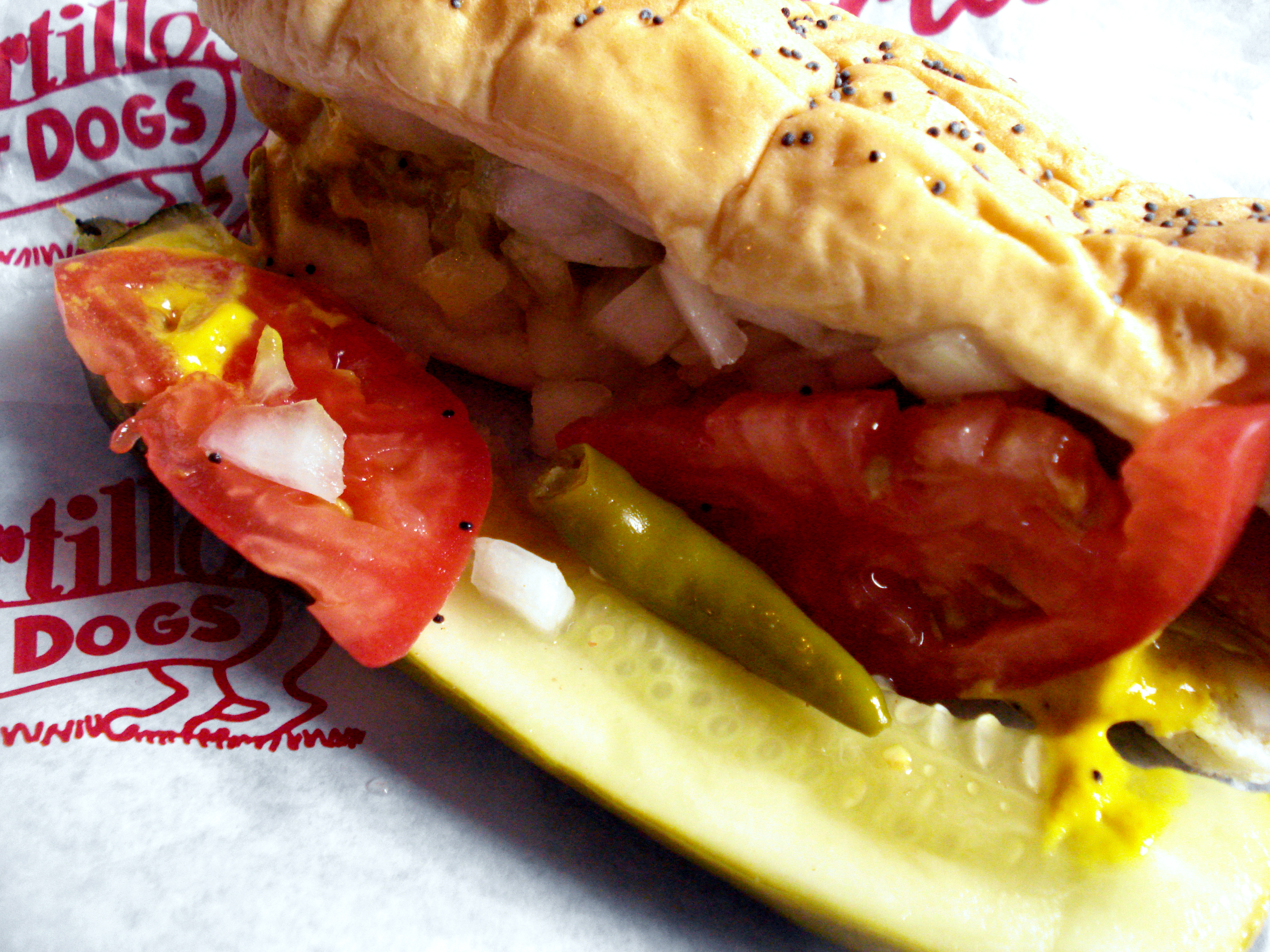
A Portillo's Chicago-style hot dog

== Outside Illinois ==
Portillo's had licensed restaurants in Tokyo, Japan, in the late 1980s and early 1990s. The Japanese locations all eventually closed.

Portillo's first California location opened on October 11, 2006, at the Buena Park Downtown shopping center in Buena Park. The second California location opened in 2008 in Moreno Valley.

Portillo's opened its first Florida location in 2016 in the Tampa suburb of Brandon, Florida, and a second location that same year in the University Square neighborhood in Tampa. The chain generated publicity with a tongue-in-cheek open letter on its website on June 16, 2015, the day after its hometown NHL team, the Chicago Blackhawks, beat the Tampa Bay Lightning to win the 2015 Stanley Cup. The stunt received newspaper coverage in both cities. "It's official. Portillo's is coming to Tampa in 2016. Tampa residents spent years peppering us with requests to build a restaurant—you really put us in a pickle. So we're thrilled we're finally making our way to Florida," Portillo's letter said, showing the chain's ironic humor. "Let's be frank: No matter whose jersey you're wearing, everyone will be welcome. We hope you don't have a beef against us or our hometown team." The locations in Tampa and Brandon have a 1930s Prohibition theme.

The Minneapolis-St. Paul region's first location opened in Woodbury in mid-summer 2017. Shortly thereafter in early fall 2017, the chain's first restaurant in the Indianapolis metropolitan area commenced operations in Fishers. Many former Chicagoans have moved to both regions. In 2018, Portillo's opened its second and third restaurants in the Minneapolis-St. Paul area (Maple Grove and Roseville, Minnesota) as well as its third and fourth Indiana locations (Mishawaka and Indianapolis) in 2018.

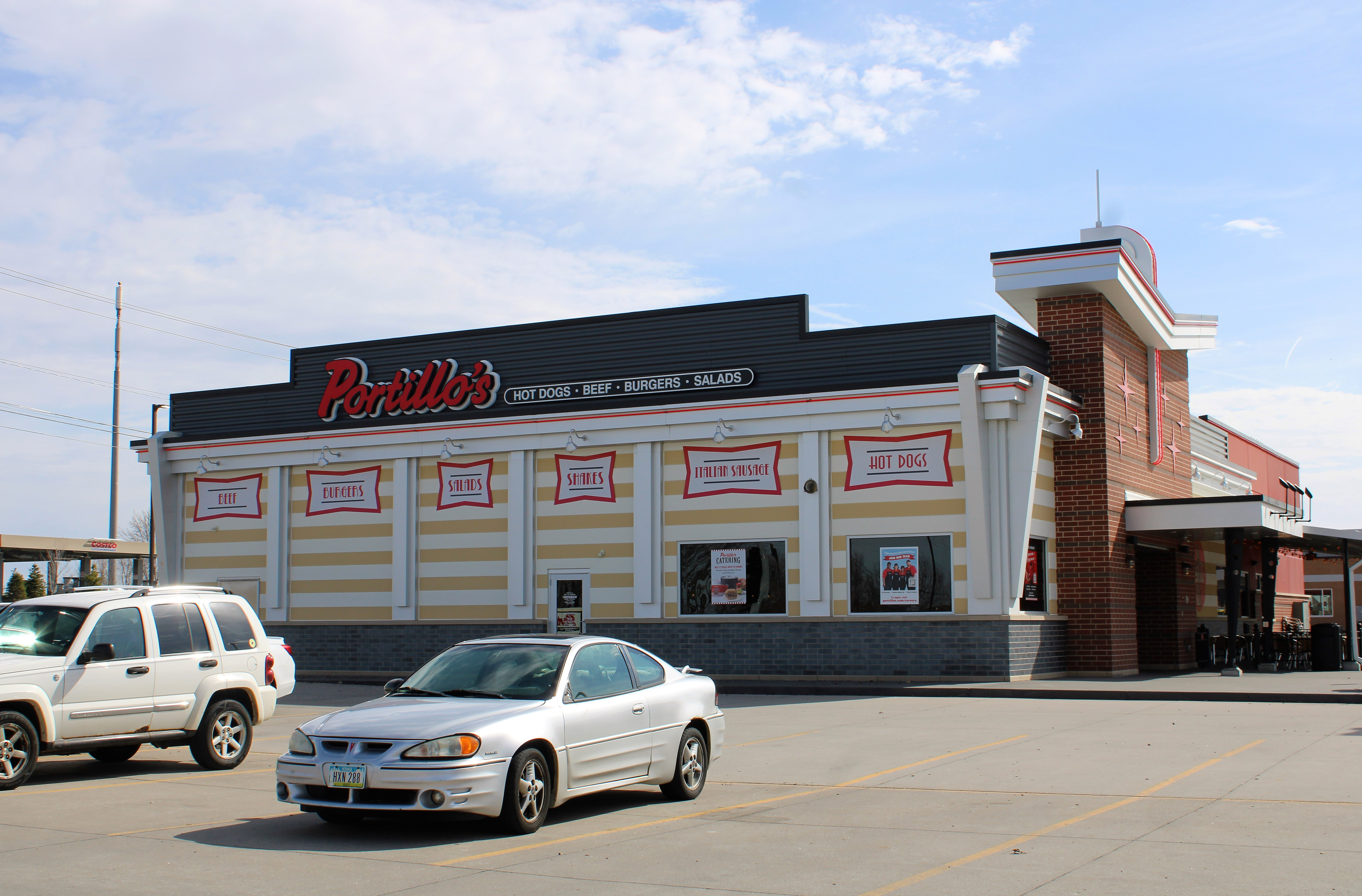
Portillo's in Davenport, Iowa

Portillo's opened its first restaurant in the Madison, Wisconsin, area and in the Davenport, Iowa/Quad Cities area (the first location in Iowa) in early 2019.

In March 2021 Portillo's opened a new location in Sterling Heights, Michigan, in Metro Detroit, which was the first location within Michigan. Its second Michigan location opened in Livonia in July 2024.

Portillo's announced a new location in the Orlando, Florida, area, located at the corner of Palm Parkway and Daryl Carter Boulevard in Lake Buena Vista; it opened in June 2021.

In December 2021, Portillo's submitted plans to build a new restaurant at Santan Village in Gilbert, Arizona.

In April 2022, Portillo's opened their fourth location in Florida, located in St. Petersburg, featuring a '50s theme, and is their third in the Tampa metropolitan area. A location in West Kissimmee, announced the same month, is their second in the Orlando area, and fifth overall in Florida. In December 2023, the sixth Portillo's in Florida, and third in the Orlando area, opened in Clermont.

In January 2023, Portillo's opened its first location in Texas. It is located in the Dallas Fort Worth Metroplex suburb of The Colony, at the intersection of SH 121/Sam Rayburn Tollway and Destination Drive at the Grandscape complex.

In February 2023, Portillo's opened the fifth and sixth locations in Arizona, located in Tucson and Gilbert.

In March 2024, the company announced it would open two new restaurants in the Houston area—one in Richmond at The Grand at Aliana and the other at the Willowbrook Mall.

In 2025, Portillos opened its first location in Georgia just outside of Atlanta.

In 2026, Portillos opened its first Greater San Antonio location in Schertz, TX.

== Honey Jam Café ==
In 2010, Portillo Restaurant Group launched the Honey Jam Café concept, an upscale pancake house similar to Walker Brothers Pancake House in both ambiance and menu as a breakfast and lunch cafe. The Batavia, Illinois, location closed in 2019.
