= IHOP =

American restaurant chain

International House of Pancakes, LLC
- Logo used since 2015
- Trade name: IHOP
- Type: Subsidiary
- Industry: Restaurants
- Founded: July 7, 1958; 68 years ago Burbank, California
- Founders: Jerry Lapin, Al Lapin Jr. and Albert Kallis
- Headquarters: Glendale, California, U.S.
- Number of locations: 1,841 (as of December 31, 2022)
- Areas served: United States (including Puerto Rico); Canada; Mexico; Guatemala; United Arab Emirates; Kuwait; Saudi Arabia; Qatar; Bahrain; Egypt; Ecuador; Pakistan; India; Panama; Peru; Honduras; Philippines; Dominican Republic; Trinidad and Tobago
- Key people: Lawrence Kim (president)
- Products: Breakfast foods; Lunch; Dinner; Sandwiches
- Revenue: ▲US$349.6 million (2006)
- Operating income: ▲US$72.8 million (2006)
- Net income: ▲US$141.1 million (2006)
- Number of employees: 32,300 (2007)
- Parent: Dine Brands (1976–present)
- Website: www.ihop.com

International House of Pancakes, LLC (branded as IHOP; US: /ˈaɪ.hɒp/ EYE-hop) is an American multinational pancake house restaurant chain that specializes in American breakfast foods. It is owned by Dine Brands—a company formed after IHOP's purchase of Applebee's, with 99% of the restaurants run by independent franchisees.

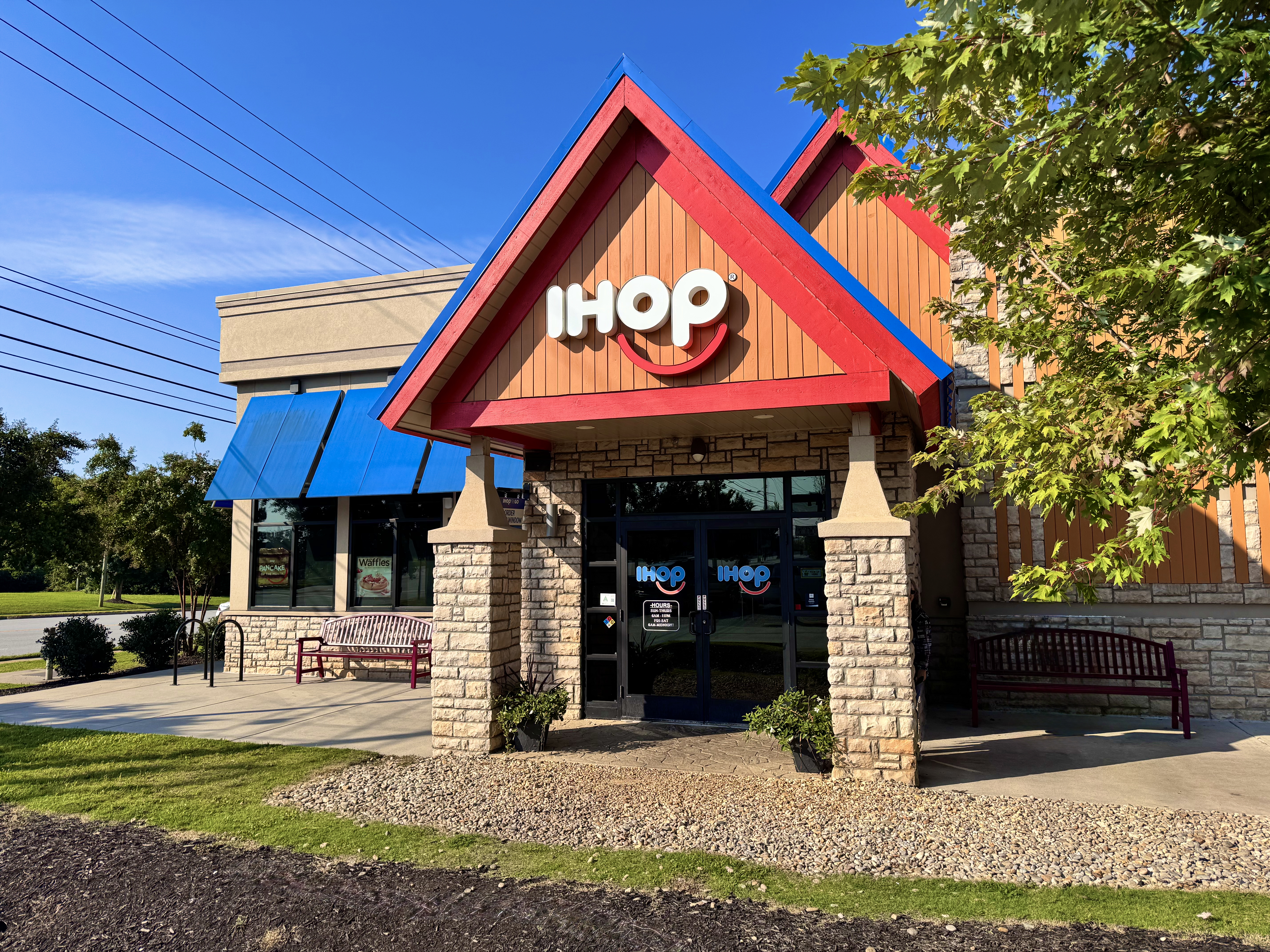
The exterior of a modern IHOP in Greenville, South Carolina

While IHOP's focus is on breakfast foods, it also offers a menu of lunch and dinner items. The company has 1,841 locations in the Americas (United States, Canada, Mexico, Panama, Peru, Ecuador and Guatemala), the Middle East (United Arab Emirates, Kuwait, Saudi Arabia and Qatar), South Asia (India and Pakistan), and Southeast Asia (Philippines), including 161 that are owned by area licensees and 1,680 that are franchised. While many of its locations are open 24 hours a day, 7 days a week, the chain's minimum operating hours are 7:00 a.m. to 10:00 p.m.

== History ==
Brothers Jerry and Al Lapin, and commercial artist Albert Kallis co-founded International House of Pancakes in the Los Angeles, California, area in 1958 with the help of Sherwood Rosenberg and William Kaye. Kallis and his wife Trudy were early investors and it was said Trudy came up with the name after giving birth to their child. The first restaurant opened on July 7, 1958, at 4301 W. Riverside Drive in Burbank, California. The second and third locations at 8555 Vesper Avenue in Panorama City, California, and 3625 Stocker Avenue in Baldwin Hills, California, (a former Brown Derby restaurant) are still open for business.

The first prototype design for IHOP building was a steep-roofed A-frame building with a distinctive blue roof; the last such location to be built was completed in 1979. While most IHOP locations no longer use the A-frame buildings, several still exist around the U.S.

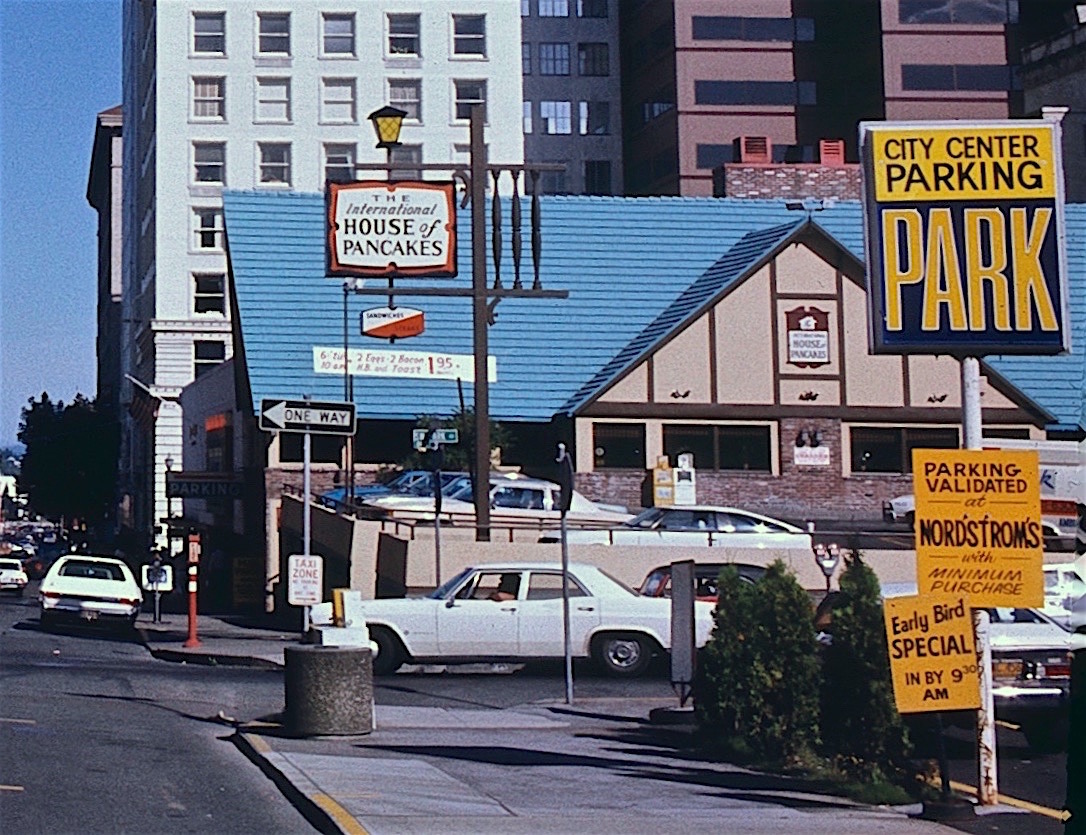
An IHOP in Portland, Oregon, in 1983, with the older look and "International House of Pancakes" signage

In 1973, the chain's name was shortened to "IHOP" for marketing purposes, using a cartoon kangaroo in its commercials at the time, and since then the full name and acronym have been officially interchangeable.

In 1976, International Industries was renamed to IHOP, Inc., and IHOP Corporation was founded as a new holding firm for IHOP, Love's Wood Pit Barbecue, and Original House of Pies (which was sold shortly afterwards). In 1979, it was purchased by Wienerwald Holding, the owners of Wienerwald and Lum's chains. Wienerwald later declared Chapter 11 bankruptcy in 1982, and sold IHOP Corp in 1983 to SVIDO, who hadn't been involved in the restaurant business previously.

The breakfast food menu later expanded (especially in the 1980s) to include standard lunch and dinner items found in similar restaurant chains such as Sambo's and Denny's. In 1976, at the same time as reorganization, International Industries became IHOP. In December 2019, IHOP announced plans to launch a chain of fast casual breakfast restaurants called Flip'd.

=== Acquisition of Applebee's ===
On July 16, 2007, IHOP Corporation announced a plan to acquire the bar-and-grill chain Applebee's in an all-cash transaction, valued at approximately US$2.1 billion. In the arrangement, Applebee's stock holders would receive $25.50 a share. IHOP stated it would franchise most of Applebee's 500 company-owned facilities. Applebee's had 1,943 restaurants worldwide at the time, including those operated by franchisees.

Applebee's shareholders approved the acquisition with a 70% vote. A number of executives from Applebee's voted against the offer. The chain's largest individual shareholder, Applebee's director Burton "Skip" Sack, called the IHOP offer unfair to its shareholders and stated he planned to sue IHOP for a higher price to be paid to him. As part of the purchase, a brand remarketing scheme and revitalization of the Applebee's image was intended. The buyout successfully closed on November 29, 2007, and the corporate entity IHOP changed its name to DineEquity on June 2, 2008.

== Menu ==
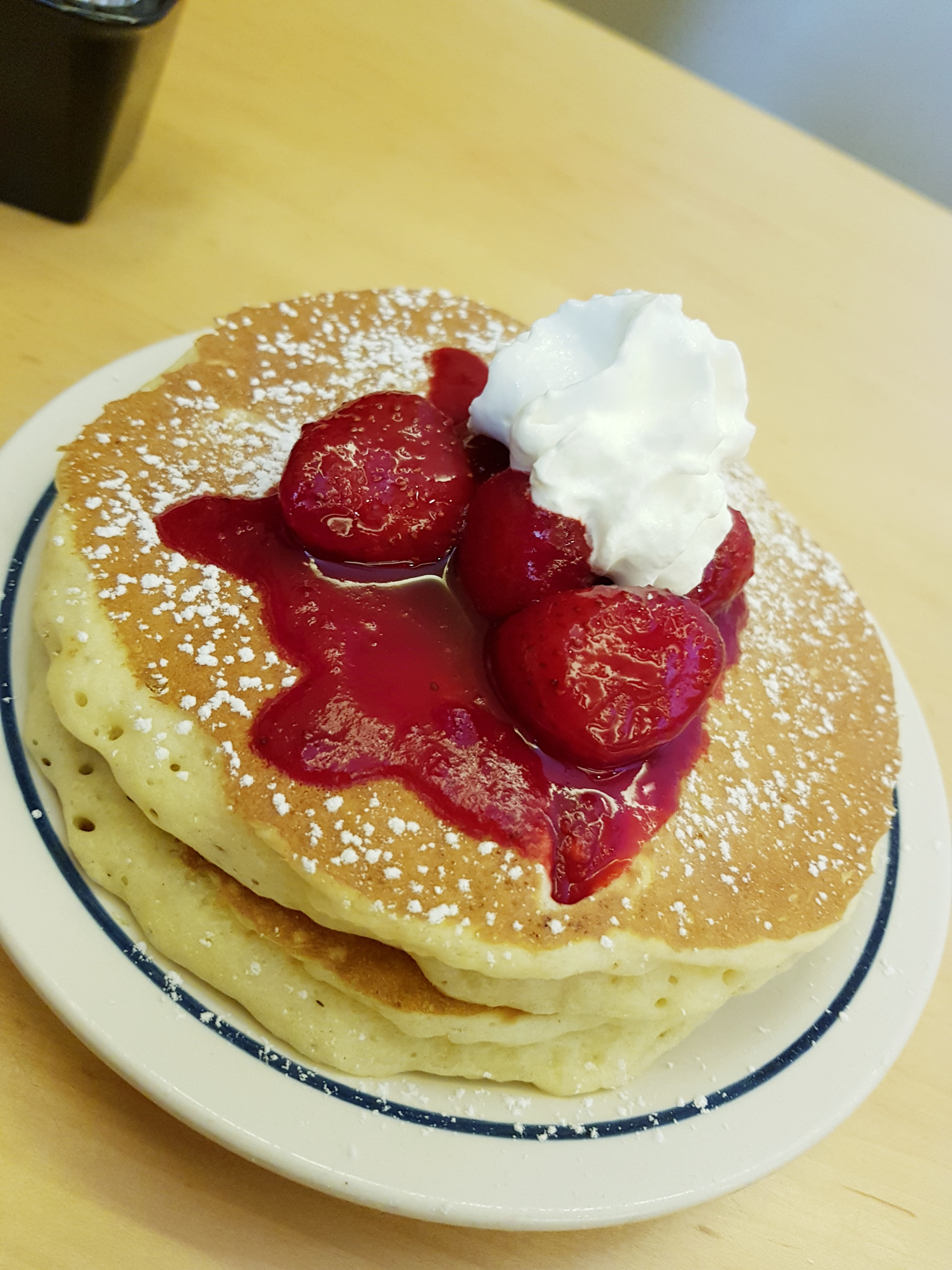
IHOP Cheesecake Pancakes

While IHOP's focus is on breakfast, serving pancakes, waffles, French toast, and omelettes, it also offers a menu of lunch and dinner items such as sandwiches, burgers, and salads. Some IHOP locations also feature coffee bars, where guests can order espresso drinks.

== Locations ==
The company has 1,841 locations in the Americas, the Middle East, South Asia and Southeast Asia.

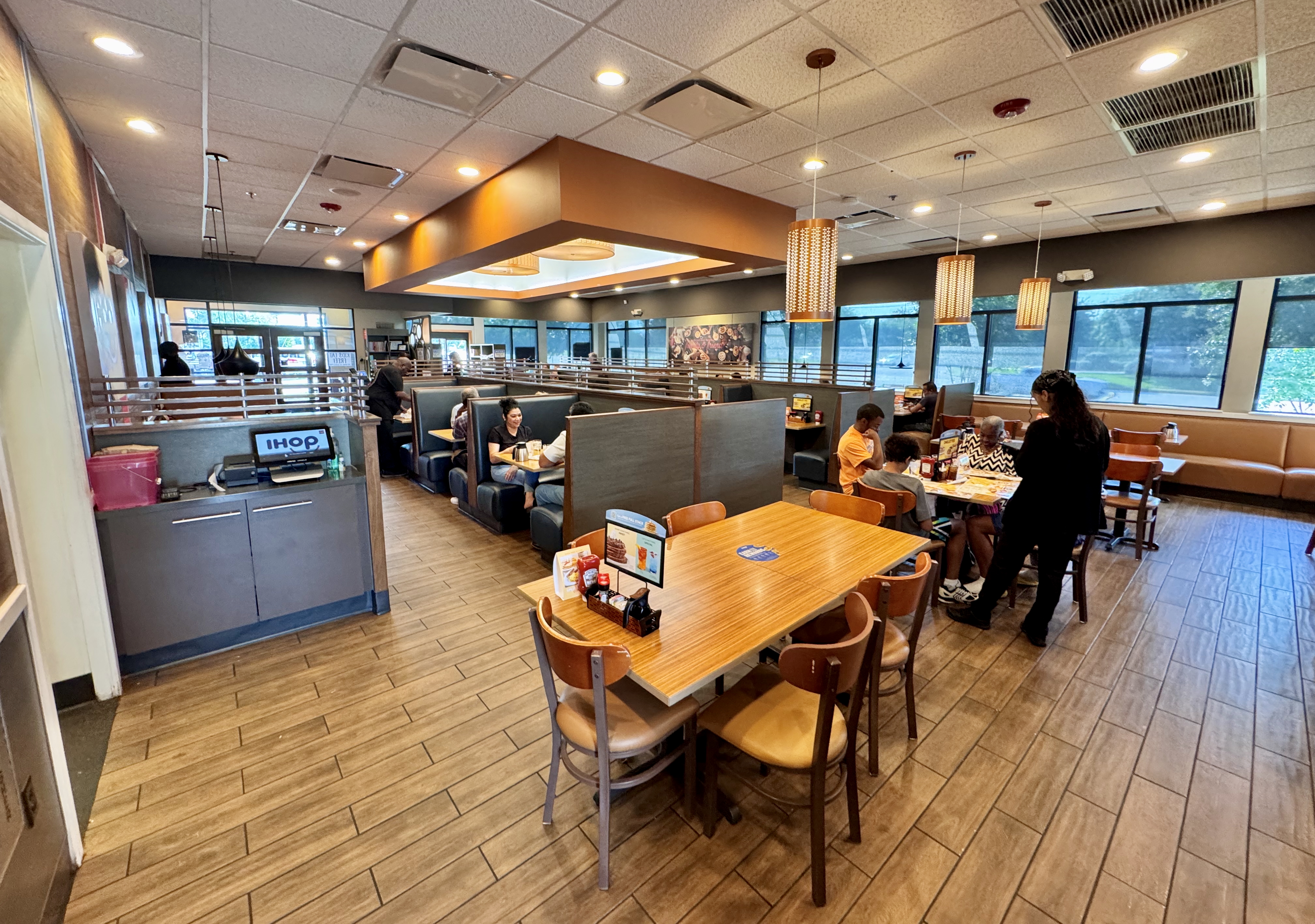
The interior of a modern IHOP in the United States

Franchising agreements with M.H. Alshaya, an international restaurant-franchising firm, resulted in an agreement for Alshaya to open as many as forty IHOP locations in the Middle East, beginning in 2012. By the end of 2018, IHOP restaurants operated in six Middle Eastern countries: Kuwait, Qatar, Bahrain, the United Arab Emirates, Saudi Arabia and Lebanon. In 2016, IHOP expanded into Central America, opening in Panama, and later in 2019 into South America, opening three locations in Ecuador and one location in Peru.

In June 2026, it was announced that IHOP would open its first location in El Salvador, situated at Plaza Santa Rosa (also known as Distrito Santa Rosa) in Santa Tecla, La Libertad. The announcement was made by the mayor of La Libertad Sur. The restaurant will be located on Avenida Diego de Holguín, near the intersection with Bulevar Sur and the Los Chorros highway.

IHOP Express' first location opened in 2011; they are a quick service version of the chain offered at locations such as airports, school campuses, military food courts and travel centers. The first standalone public location of the concept opened in downtown San Diego in 2011.

In 2019, IHOP announced plans to open a fast-casual restaurant, Flip'd by IHOP. Flip'd would include a menu serving pancake bowls, burgers, and fried chicken.

A franchisee opened a hybrid Applebee's/IHOP restaurant in downtown Detroit in mid-2018. In March 2024, Dine Brands announced it was exploring Applebee's-IHOP dual-branded restaurants within 12–24 months, following the successful introduction of prototypes in international markets.

In November 2026, several IHOP locations in Puerto Rico closed as the operator, Encanto Restaurants, filed for Chapter 11 bankruptcy protection. IHOP Puerto Rico previously filed for bankruptcy in 2012, just three years after entering the market.

== Marketing ==
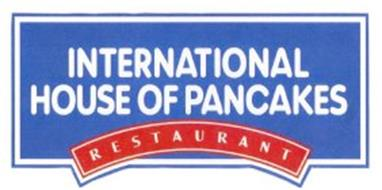
Logo used from 1994 to 2003

IHOP logo, used until 2015

In June 2015, IHOP introduced an updated logo, removing its decorative elements and adding a curved line under the "O" and "P" letters to resemble a smiley face. The company said that the previous logo looked too much like a frown.

In June 2018, an IHOP marketing campaign announced they would "flip" their name to "IHOb"; it was ultimately revealed to be a marketing campaign for its hamburgers, in an effort to address perceptions that IHOP was still primarily oriented towards breakfast food. The tease of the campaign led to speculation via social media regarding the intent of the change. IHOP parodied the campaign the following year to promote a new hamburger that includes a pancake as an ingredient, jokingly stating that they would refer to their burgers as "pancakes" because people wanted IHOP to "stick to pancakes".

In November 2025, IHOP leadership revealed plans to franchisees to offer Kids Eat Free in December. This was met with a response of revolt from franchise operators, due to the fact they were not consulted beforehand, there was no opt-out option, and the costs that they would incur from the free food offer. Operators have expressed concerns that they would not be compensated fairly and the promotion was not a marketing decision, but a leadership decision.

== Lawsuit ==
In early September 2010, IHOP filed a lawsuit in U.S. District Court in Los Angeles against International House of Prayer and six other defendants, alleging trademark dilution and infringement. The lawsuit was dropped on December 21, 2010, with the dispute resolved out of court.

== See also ==
- Denny's
- Golden Nugget Pancake House
- List of pancake houses
- The Original Pancake House
- Pancake house
- Waffle House
- Walker Bros.
