= Pancake house =

Restaurant specializing in breakfast items

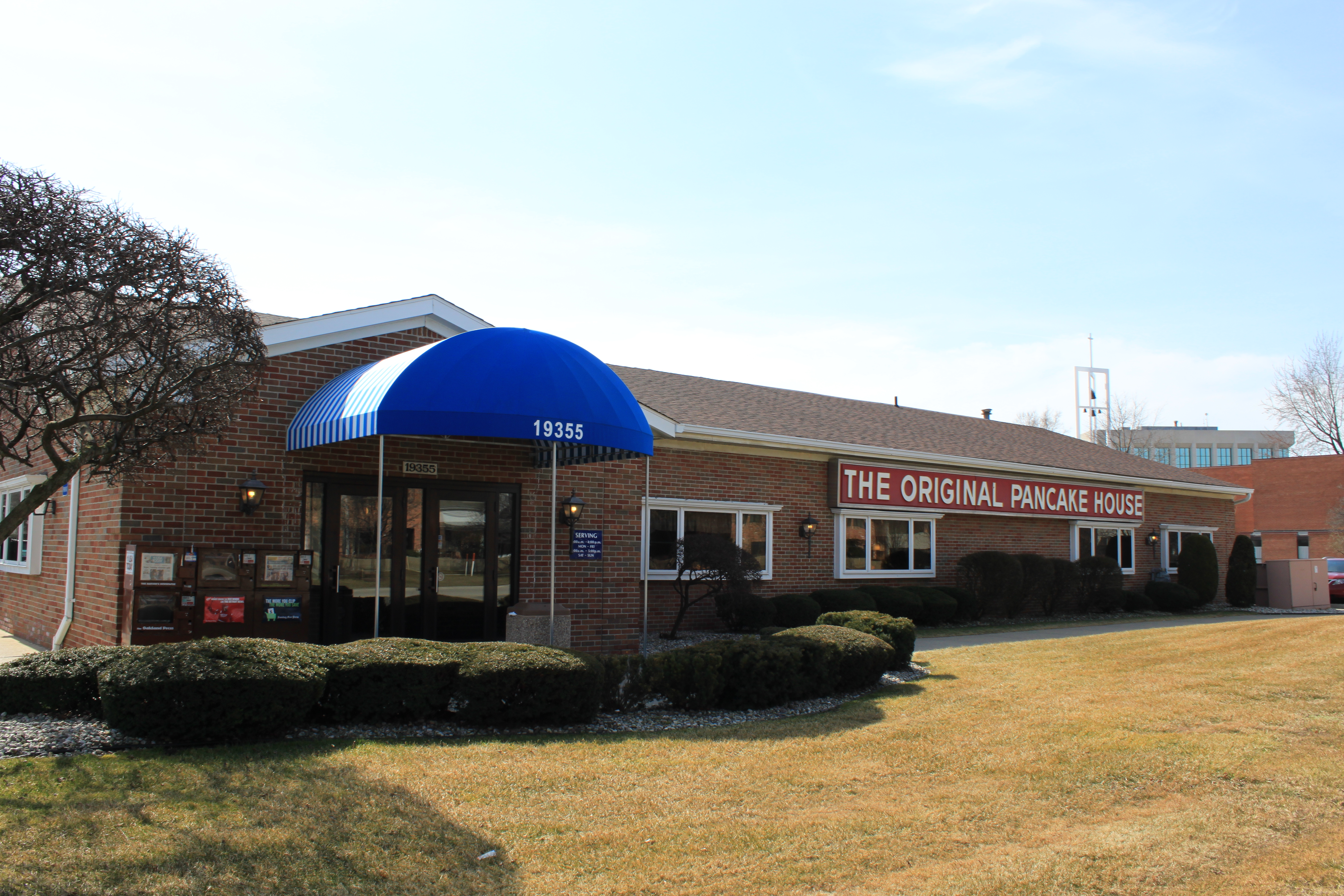
The Original Pancake House in Southfield, Michigan

A pancake house, pancake and waffle house or waffle house is a restaurant that specializes in breakfast items such as pancakes, waffles, and omelettes, among other items. Many small, independent pancake houses, as well as large corporations and franchises, use the terminology in their establishment names, most notably the International House of Pancakes (IHOP), Waffle House and The Original Pancake House. Most pancake houses are dine-in, although most will offer carry-out as well. Many are open until around 3 a.m. Exceptions to this are large chains such as IHOP and Denny's, which are usually open 24 hours. Some independent pancake houses are found in strip malls, or exist as stand-alone structures that have been re-fitted, such as a closed-down diner or retail store.

== Fare ==
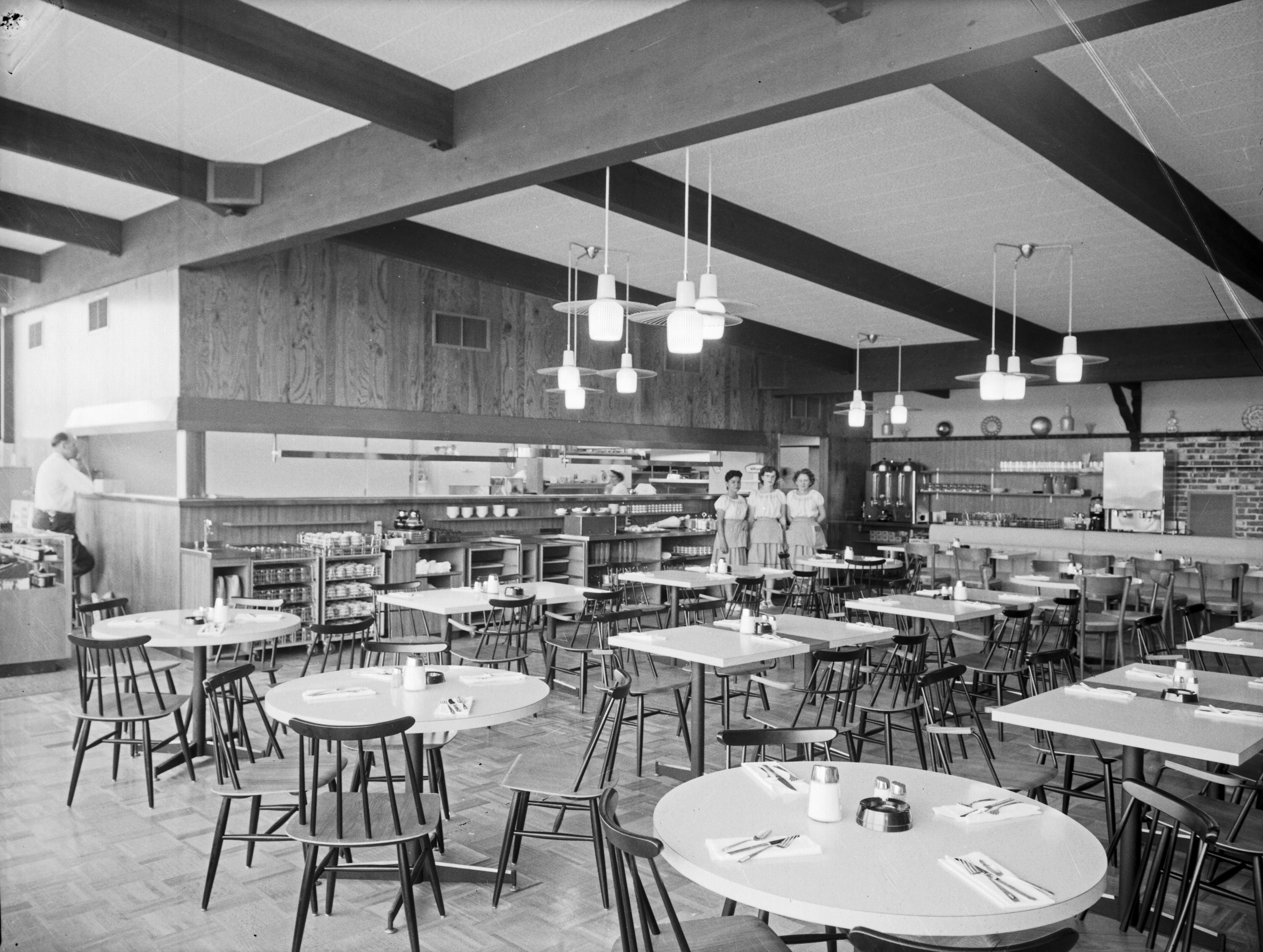
1960 – Clark's Pancake House at Pacific Highway South and South 151st St. south, in Tukwila, Washington

Pancake houses in the United States may offer various pancake styles, such as buttermilk, buckwheat and sourdough, along with pancakes blended with fruit, nuts and chocolate. They will also commonly offer different styles of pancakes which originate in different parts of the world, such as German pancakes, Swedish pancakes, Dutch Apple pancakes, crepes, 49er's flapjacks, and others, as well as Belgian waffles, buttermilk waffles, and French toast. In addition, a wide variety of breakfast foods are common at pancake house restaurants, which includes grits, oatmeal, omelettes, egg dishes, breakfast meats such as bacon and sausage, and combinations such as pigs in a blanket and eggs benedict. Some also offer lunch items such as chicken, steak, chili, salads, hamburgers and sandwiches.

== In Europe ==
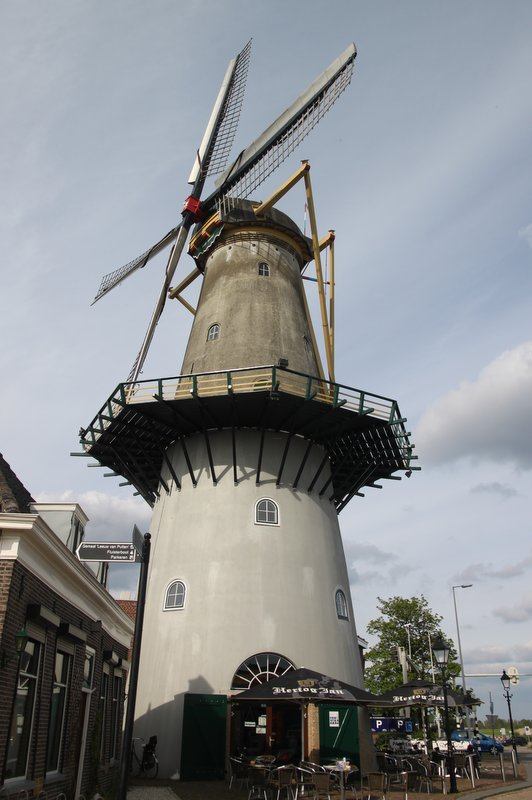
Nooitgedacht mill in the Netherlands, which has a pancake house within it

=== Netherlands ===
In Amsterdam, Netherlands, some pancake houses offer up to 70 pancake varieties. In Holland, a region in the western part of the Netherlands, some pancake houses serve poffertjes, a traditional Dutch batter treat that resembles small, fluffy pancakes. Moreover, Dutch pancakes are generally eaten as full lunch or dinner meals, and not as breakfast items like in the United States.

==== Restaurants ====
Some examples of pancake house restaurants in the Netherlands include Bunnik, Lage Vuursche, The Pancake Bakery, Boerderij Meerzicht and De Carrousel.

=== Denmark ===
In Denmark there is a restaurant chain where pancakes and ice cream are offered. It is called Rasmus Klump Familierestaurant, after the Danish character "Rasmus Klump", whose favorite meal is pancakes.

== In the United States ==
There are many pancake houses in existence throughout the United States. Some restaurateurs in the United States have focused on offering breakfast foods for consumers to eat at times of the day other than in the morning, to make pancake and waffle houses more competitive.

Some U.S. cities have a significant number of pancake houses. For example, Williamsburg, Virginia, has the highest per capita ratio of waffle and pancake houses in the world. Myrtle Beach, South Carolina, has a significant number of pancake houses, numbering over 10 in a two-mile distance. The Grand Strand, a large stretch of beaches on the East Coast of the United States that consists of over 60 miles of beach land, has been noted for having a considerable number of pancake houses.

=== Notable pancake houses ===
As of 2012, Cracker Barrel, whose menu is based on traditional Southern cuisine with appearance and decor designed to resemble an old-fashioned general store, operates 620 stores in 42 states. As of 2006, Denny's has 1,600 restaurants. IHOP has over 1,550 total locations in the United States and in other countries. Waffle House is a restaurant chain that has over 1,500 locations in the United States. The Original Pancake House has over 100 franchised restaurants in the United States, and in Portland, Oregon, where it was founded, it has been open since 1953. It is known for offering a wide range of breakfast dishes and items. Sears Fine Food, a pancake house in San Francisco, California, has been serving Swedish pancakes since 1938. In Oklahoma City, Oklahoma, Beverly's restaurant (now named Beverly's In The Rough) opened as a pancake house on May 19, 1921. The restaurant still prepares pancakes from scratch.

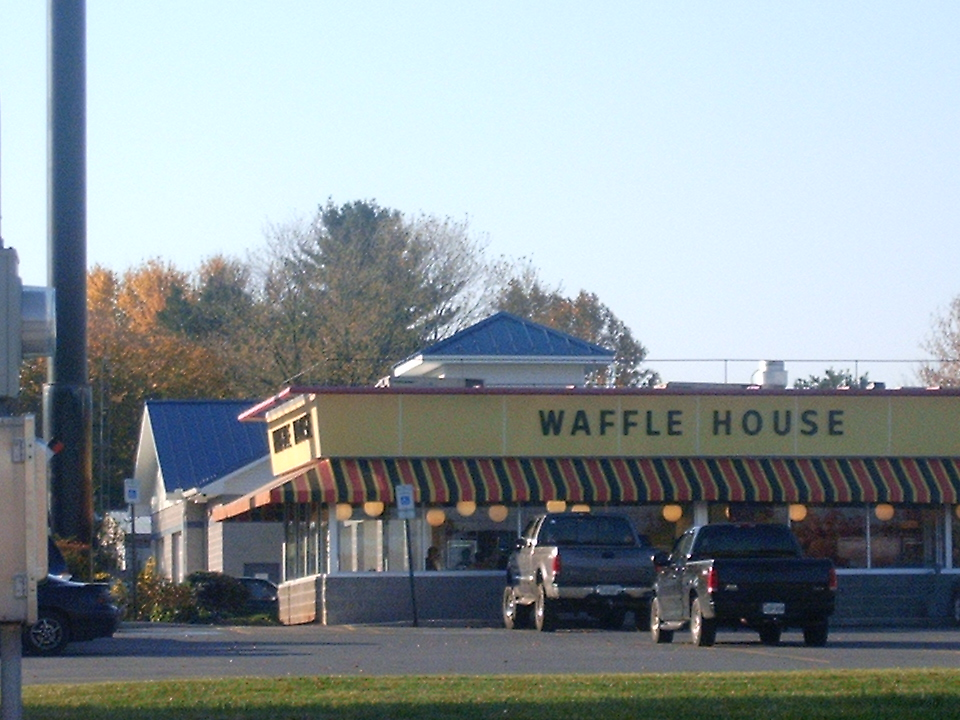
A Waffle House restaurant in Hagerstown, Maryland

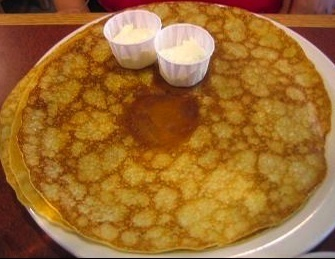
49er flapjack, a sourdough crepe from Naperville Pancake Cafe

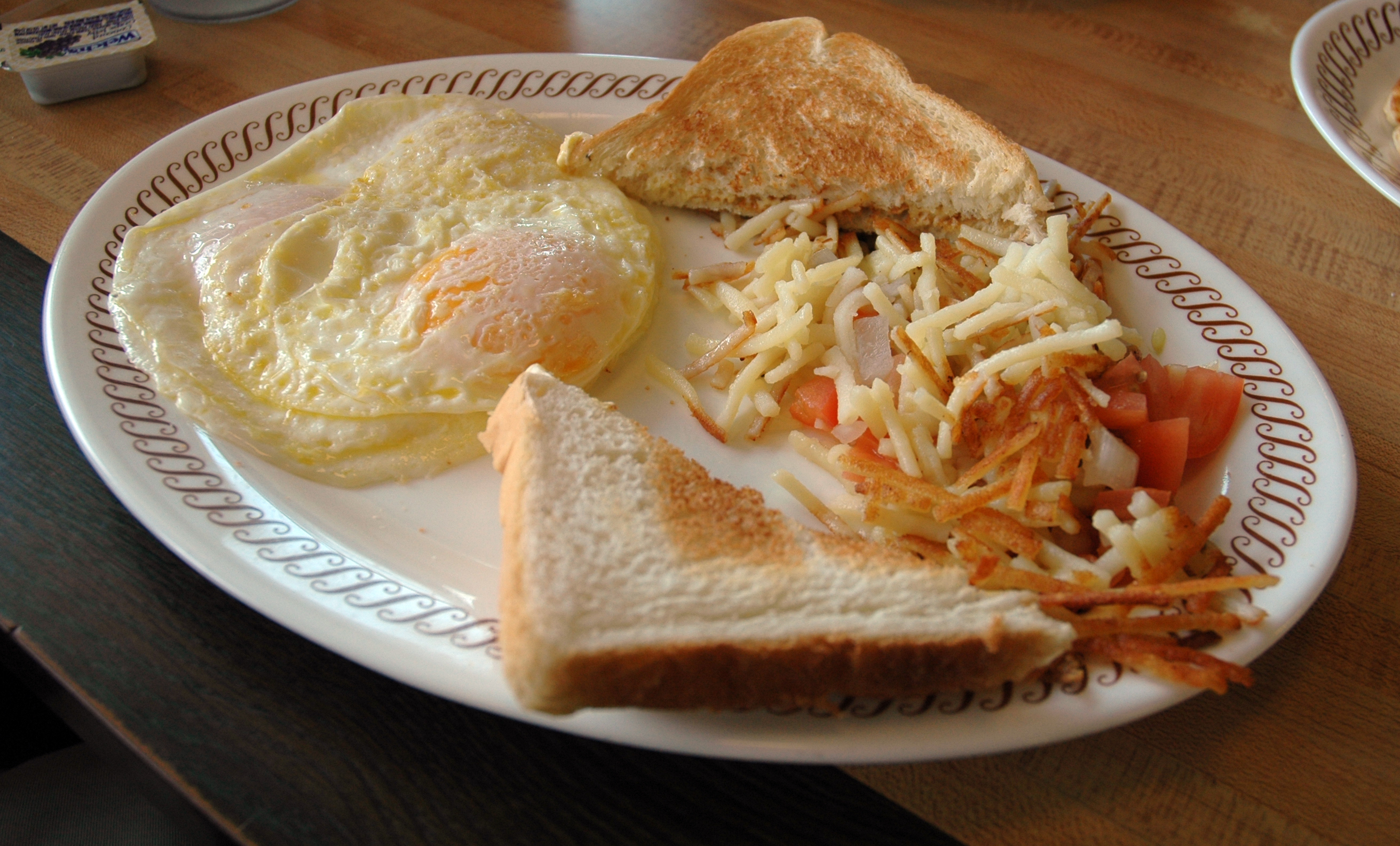
A dish at a Waffle House restaurant in Arkansas

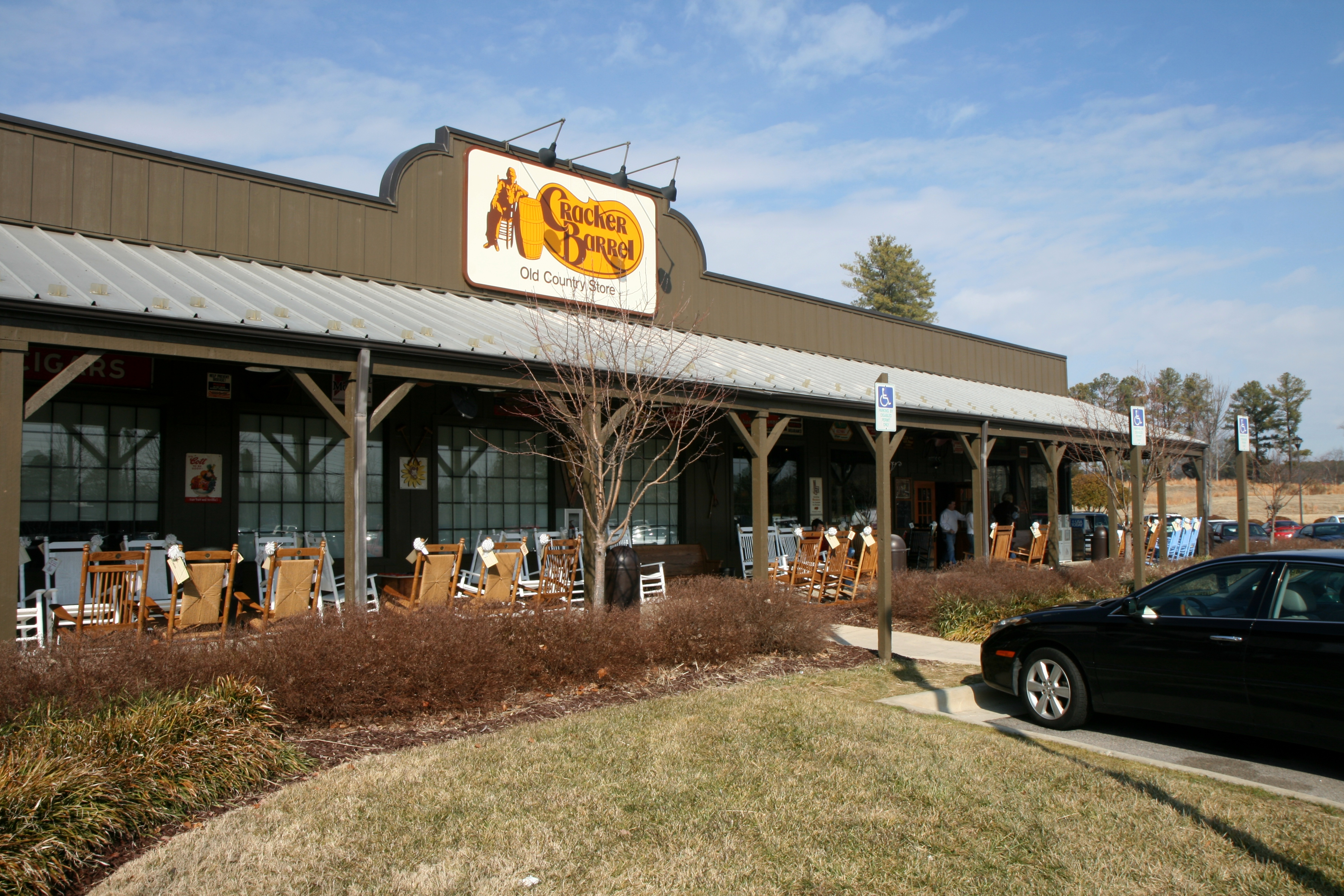
A Cracker Barrel restaurant

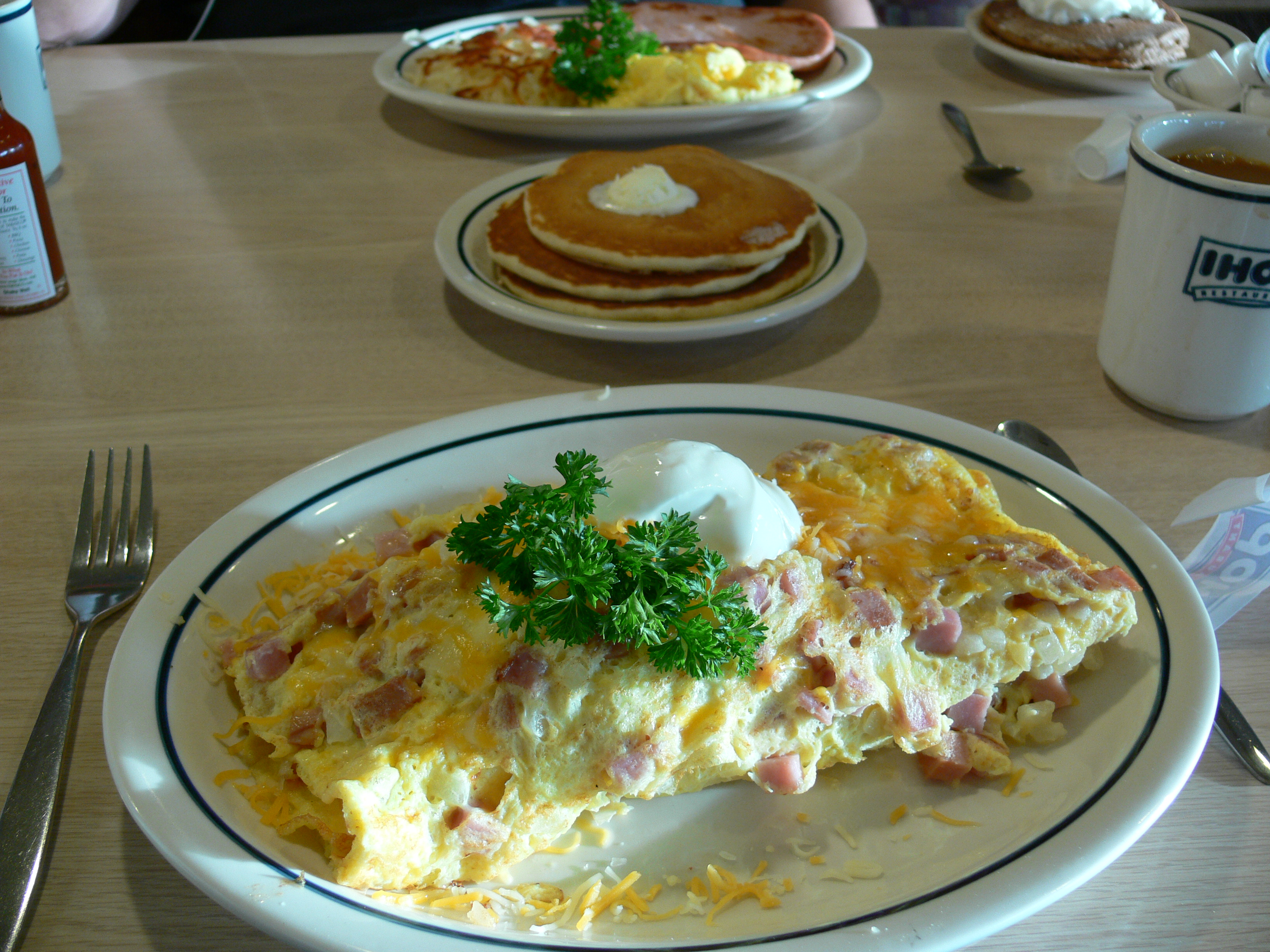
IHOP breakfast foods

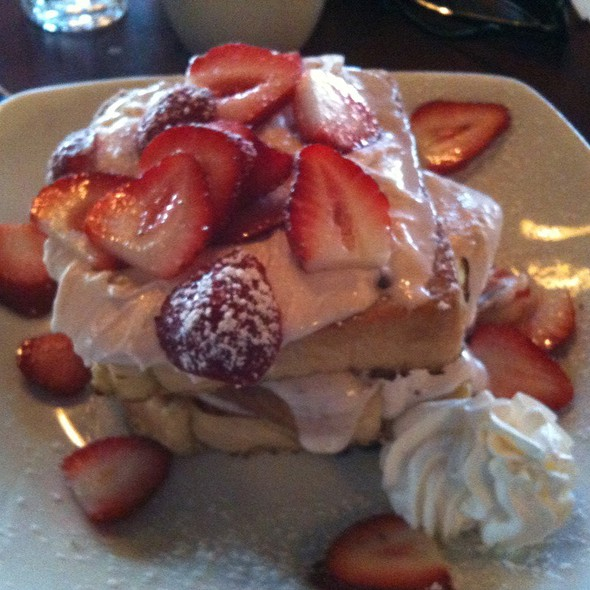
Honey Jam Cafe stuffed french toast

== See also ==
- Cracker Barrel
- Golden Nugget Pancake House
- Honey Jam Cafe
- List of breakfast beverages
- List of breakfast foods
- List of pancake houses
- The Original Pancake House
- Walker Bros.
