= Walker Bros. =

Restaurant chain in Illinois

Walker Bros. The Original Pancake House

Restaurant information
- Established: 1953; 73 years ago
- Food type: Breakfast
- Dress code: Casual
- Location: Chicago, Cook County, Illinois, United States
- Website: WalkerBros.net; WalkerBrosOPH.com

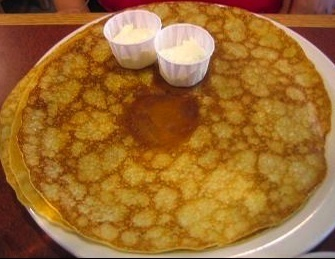
49er flapjacks are one of the signature menu items at Walker Bros.

Walker Bros. is a series of pancake houses in the Chicago area. They developed as a franchised spin-off of The Original Pancake House, founded in Portland, Oregon, in 1953 by Les Highet and Erma Hueneke; the Walker Bros. version has been in business for over 45 years. Like the original, they are known for their apple pancakes, French toast, and omelettes.

== Awards and recognition ==
The restaurant was recognized by USA Today as one of the "Top Ten Pancake Restaurants in the Nation." Zagat recognized them as Chicago's "best breakfast – bar none" and the "north and Northwest suburban family favorite." Chicago magazine presented them with the Critic's Choice Award for the "best breakfast" around. The restaurant has also been recognized by AOL Cityguide in 2006 and 2007 for "City's Best Breakfast" (Chicago). They received the "Gold Cup" from Superior Coffee Company, a coveted award of excellence.

Chef and food critic James Beard, who grew up in Portland, named The Original Pancake House as one of the top ten "best" in America. In 1999, the Original Pancake House in Portland was designated by the James Beard Foundation as a regional landmark restaurant.

== In popular culture ==
Daryl Hall of Hall and Oates wrote the song "Rich Girl" about Victor Walker, Jr., an heir to Walker Bros. Hall changed the lyrics from "rich guy" to "rich girl" because it sounded better. It was released in 1976.

The 1980 feature film Ordinary People features a scene at a Walker Bros. pancake house. Walker Bros. was also mentioned in the 2004 feature film Mean Girls.

In 2010, Dick Portillo, the founder of Portillo's Restaurants in Chicago opened Honey Jam Cafe, a fast casual breakfast restaurant modeled after the ambiance and menu of Walker Bros.

== See also ==
- Golden Nugget Pancake House
- Honey Jam Cafe
- Waffle House
- The Original Pancake House
