= Forkner =

Forkner is a surname. Notable people with the surname include:

- Adam Forkner (born 1976), American musician
- Hamden L. Forkner (1897–1975), American educator and writer
- Tom Forkner (1918–2017), American businessman, lawyer, and golfer
- Austin Forkner (1998), American motorcycle racer

== See also ==
- Fortner
- Forkner shorthand
- Forkners Hill, Missouri
