= Callaway Gardens =

Resort complex in Pine Mountain, Georgia, U.S.

Callaway Resort & Gardens

- Location within Georgia Location within the United States
- Location: Harris County, Georgia, U.S.
- Nearest city: Pine Mountain, Georgia
- Coordinates: 32.8448°N 84.8515°W
- Area: 2,500 acres (10.12 km^{2}; 3.91 sq mi)
- Designation: National Natural Landmark
- Established: May 1, 1952; 74 years ago
- Named for: Ida Cason Callaway
- Visitors: 1,000,000 (in 2006)
- Governing body: Ida Cason Callaway Foundation
- Administrator: William “Bill” Doyle, III (President & CEO)
- Building details
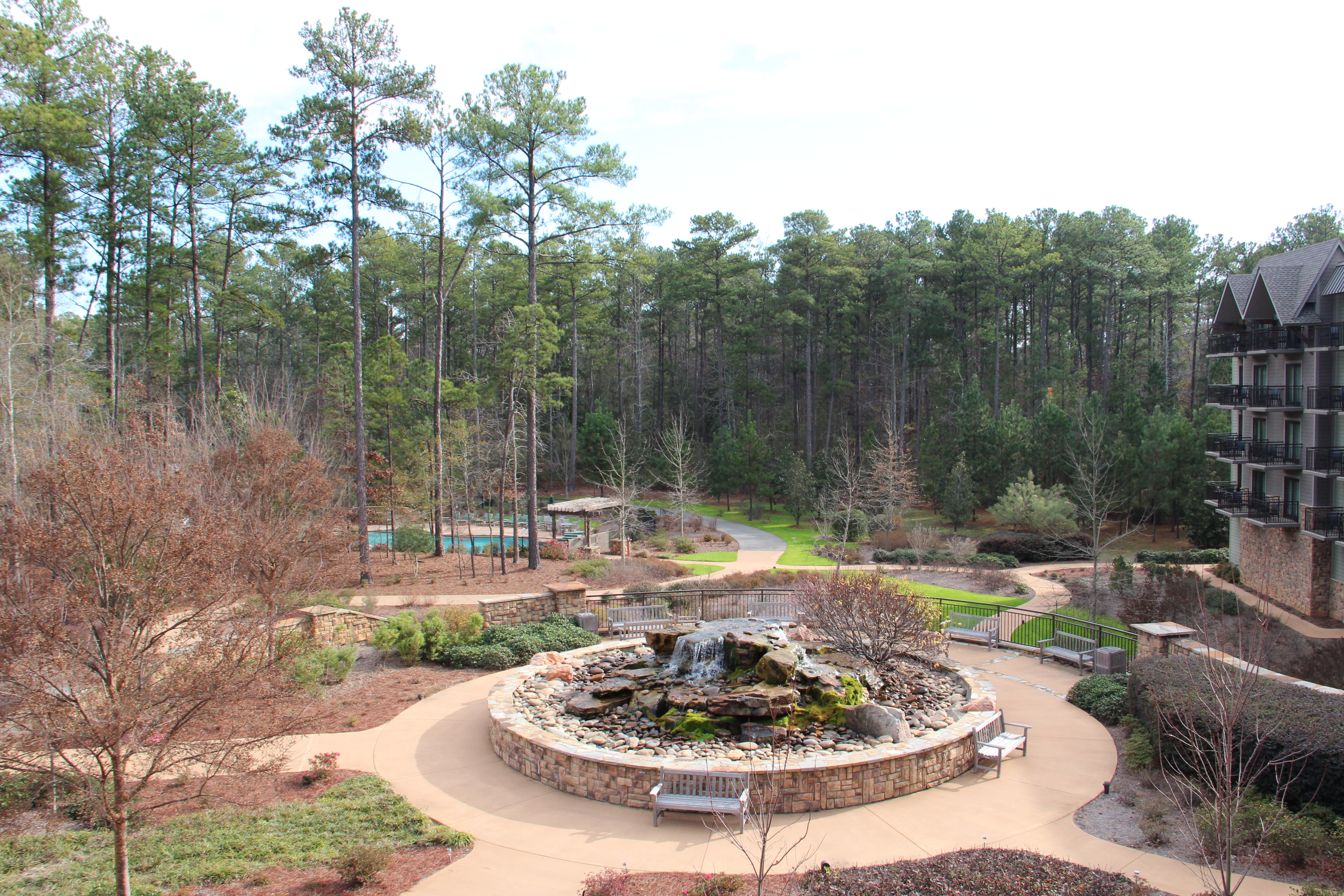
- Callaway Gardens Lodge and Spa

General information
- Groundbreaking: September 27, 2005
- Opened: November 1, 2006; 19 years ago
- Renovated: 2016
- Renovation cost: $2.5 million
- Owner: Ida Cason Callaway Foundation

Technical details
- Floor count: 4
- Lifts/elevators: 2

Design and construction
- Developer: Noble Investment Group
- Awards: AAA Four Diamonds
- Designations: LEED Certified
- Known for: Spa Prunifolia

Other information
- Number of rooms: 149
- Number of restaurants: 4
- Number of bars: 2
- Facilities: Conference center
- Parking: valet, self

Website
- www.callawaygardens.com

Callaway Resort & Gardens is a 2,500-acre (1,000 ha) resort complex located near Pine Mountain in Harris County, Georgia, 18 miles (29 km) from LaGrange, Georgia. The world's largest azalea garden, this destination draws over 750,000 visitors annually. Callaway Gardens was ranked as Best Georgia Attraction in 2018 by USA Today.

On April 6, 2022, Herschend Family Entertainment agreed to purchase the revenue-producing assets at Callaway Gardens from the Ida Cason Callaway Foundation. The foundation remains responsible for operation and maintenance of the garden's free attractions.

== History and expansion ==
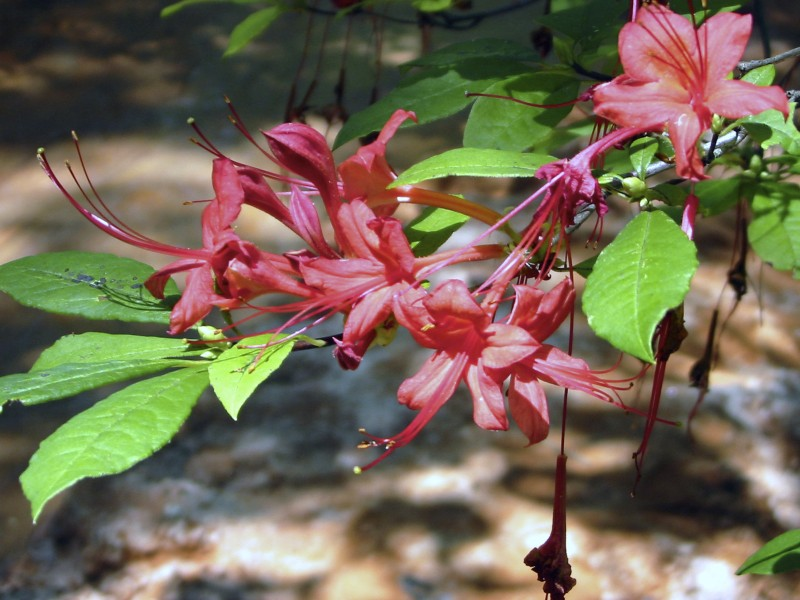
Plumleaf azalea

When the Great Depression struck in 1929, much of Harris County land was former cotton fields that were "worn out", depleted of nutrients after nearly 100 years of cultivation. Former Callaway Mills Chairman Cason Callaway and his wife, Virginia, acquired vast tracts of property in stages, eventually reaching 40,000 acres (161.87 km^{2}; 62.50 sq mi). Callaway originally conceived of developing the garden in 1930 after he discovered a rare azalea, Rhododendron prunifolium (plumleaf), growing in the area.

To create the garden, streams were dammed creating 13 lakes; bulldozers filled in eroded gullies and drained bottom land clogged with silt; crops were planted that restored nitrogen and other nutrients in the soil. Virginia Callaway consulted with Gilmore David Clarke, a noted landscape architect, to plant more than 20,000 trees, shrubs and native flowers in the renovated landscape.

=== Foundation ===
Callaway Gardens opened on May 21, 1952, as the Ida Cason Gardens. It had 13,000 acres (52.61 km^{2}; 20.31 sq mi), a number of lakes, a golf course, and scenic drives. The Ida Cason Callaway Foundation was established at that time. The gardens were named for the mother of founder Cason J. Callaway. Robin Lake Beach and the Overlook Azalea Garden opened the following year in 1953. In 1955, the gardens were renamed as Ida Cason Callaway Gardens.

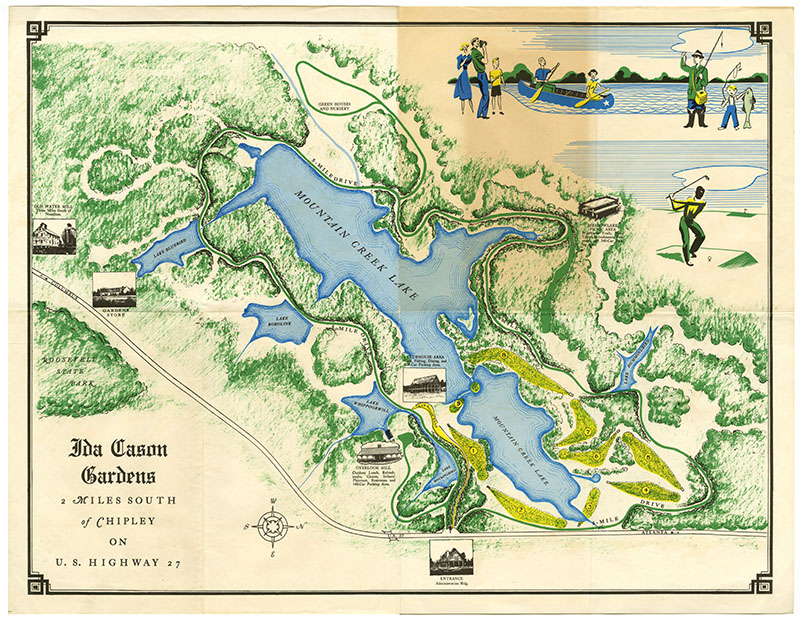
Map of Ida Cason gardens

After serving in the Korean War, their son Bo Callaway returned to Harris County, Georgia to help his parents develop and run the gardens. He was named executive director on June 10, 1953. On April 12, 1961, founder Cason J. Callaway died. He was succeeded as chairman of the board by his wife, co-founder Virginia (Hand) Callaway.

The gardens have been expanded several times following Cason Callaway's death. The 3,000-acre (1,200 ha) Cason J. Callaway Memorial Forest opened in 1972, and was designated a National Natural Landmark by the United States Department of the Interior.

==== Ferry ====
On Sunday, June 30, 1974 an incident occurred on Robin Lake when a ski boat passed close to a paddlewheel (ferry) boat. The wake splashed into the paddle wheel boat and passengers over-reacted, rushing to the opposite site of the boat, which may have been overloaded. The paddlewheel boat tipped over, spilling passengers into the lake. Few, if any persons were wearing life jackets. Other boats quickly responded and pulled people from the lake.

==== Drowning ====
On July 4, 2009, two men went into the water to assist a small boy who was struggling in Robin Lake. One of them grabbed the boy and dragged him back to shallow water. The other man had disappeared and his body was recovered later. Rico Cruz, a 21-year-old from Eastpoint, Georgia drowned.

=== Non-Callaway management ===
Following Virginia Hand Callaway's death in 1995, George P. Fischer was named the third President & CEO of Callaway Gardens. Fischer resigned after 7 years and was replaced on November 25, 2003, by Edward Cason Callaway, Bo's son. Howard H. “Bo” Callaway, who served the Gardens since January 1953, was designated chairman emeritus.

The Ida Cason Callaway Foundation applied for and was granted conservation easements on land in 2004 and 2007 by the Georgia Forestry Commission. The easements lower property taxes and restricts use of the land if sold. It can only be developed to include a lodge on 15 acres (6.1 ha).

During the economic downturn in 2012, Callaway Gardens sold 7,000 of its 13,000 acres to remain solvent. Edward C. Callaway remained in charge until 2014, when he stepped down. Don Perry served as acting president and CEO while an executive search continued.

=== Outside management ===
William R. "Bill" Doyle, III was hired in June 2015 to replace Edward Callaway. Callaway had just turned 60 and wanted to find a leader with "expertise to take the gardens and resort to the next level with new programming and branding efforts". Doyle had 25 years of experience in the Hospitality industry, including Brasstown Valley Resort in Young Harris, Georgia, Wild Adventures in Valdosta, Georgia and Dollywood. Edward Callaway remained a trustee of the Ida Cason Callaway Foundation.

Bicycle trails throughout the gardens were upgraded in 2016 at a cost of approximately $750,000.

In early 2017, about 11 acres of 60-year-old timber was clear cut. Doyle stated that it was done to open the views from the Lodge/Spa. Niles Bolton Associates were hired to landscape the open area. Doyle did not comment on the tree income or provide a project cost but claimed it "would not be inexpensive". The gardens closed temporarily following Hurricane Irma in September 2017, as it downed hundreds of trees and left the area without power. Cleanup lasted more than a week.

Cason’s Tap Room is Callaway Gardens’ newest eating and drinking establishment just outside the Lodge. It opened February 5, 2018, on the birthday of founder Cason J Callaway. In addition to the standard menu served at all restaurants in the Lodge complex, craft beers (including their own, Cason’s); "handcrafted" (specialty) cocktails; and an extensive wine menu, including their own Callaway Family Wines, are offered. Patrons can sit inside or outside on the patio, depending on the weather.

During Doyle's tenure he closed two popular major attractions that had been open for 30+ years: Sibley Horticultural Center. This brought some criticism.

Doyle resigned effective July 8, 2019, to return to a previous employer, Herschend Family Entertainment. He briefly remained a trustee of the Ida Cason Callaway Foundation and assisted in the search for his replacement.

Garland E. Horton, III was hired as President/CEO in 2019 and continues as of 2022.

=== Lodge and Spa ===
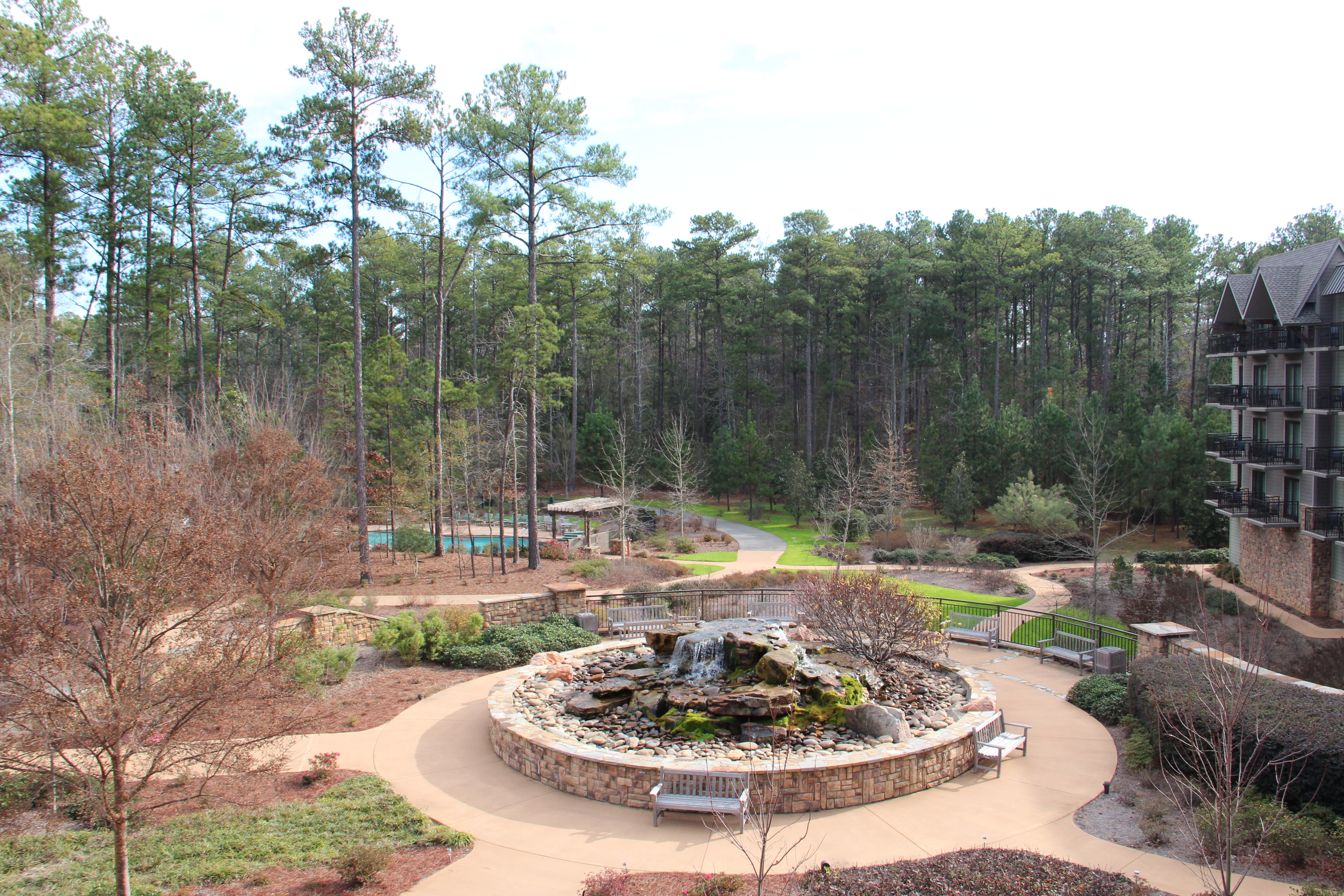
The Lodge & Spa at Callaway Gardens

In a joint venture between Callaway Gardens and Atlanta-based Noble Investment Group, ground was broken on September 27, 2005, for Callaway's resort hotel, the 90,000-square-foot (8,400 m^{2}) Lodge & Spa. Each of the 150 large guest rooms has a balcony, a 4-fixture bathroom, and windows for natural light. The 13,000-square-foot (1,200 m^{2}) Spa has over a dozen treatment rooms offering traditional massage, hydrotherapy, Vichy showers, yoga and exercise rooms, plus salon services.

The Lodge opened November 1, 2006, just as attendance peaked at 1 million admissions. Noble developed the property, but Callaway Gardens had the option to purchase it. Noble contracted with Marriott Hotels & Resorts to operate the property, and Noble kept all the profits. Two years later, the 2008 financial crisis sharply reduced tourism. Yearly visitors had dropped to 400,000 in 2010/11 just as debt had grown to more than $44 million. Callaway Gardens sold the Mountain Creek Inn, its conference center, to Noble Investment Group for $12 million, along with 40 cottages for $4 million, but that was not enough. The Ida Cason Callaway Foundation decided that selling large tracts of land was the best way to reduce debt. In July 2012, 4,500 acres (1,800 ha) was sold to Joe Rogers Jr., Chairman of Waffle House for $8 million.

Another 2,560 acres (1,040 ha) was sold for $4.63 million to an Atlanta Real Estate broker Brad Smith. CEO Edward Callaway stated that the Gardens were now "on sound financial footing" with total debt down to $7.5 million, which he called a "sustainable level". Callaway Garden's land area was reduced from 13,000 to 6,000 acres (5,300 to 2,400 ha) with no plans to sell more. However, at some point the 6,000 acres (2,400 ha) left after the 2012 sales was reduced by 3,500 acres (1,400 ha), because current promotional media states that Callaway Gardens is a 2,500-acre (1,000 ha) garden. Although Edward Callaway claimed that the gardens finances were stable following the 2012 land sales, there were deeper cuts to be made. Two popular major attractions, Mr. Cason's Vegetable Garden and the Sibley Horticultural Center were closed in late October and early November 2015. Each had been open for more than 30 years.

William R. Doyle III, President & CEO announced in mid-April 2016 that Callaway Gardens had purchased The Lodge & Spa from Noble Investment Group and would begin a $2.5 million renovation of the entire Lodge & Spa facility. The spa was renamed, “Spa Prunifolia”, a reference to the rare azalea that still grows at the garden.

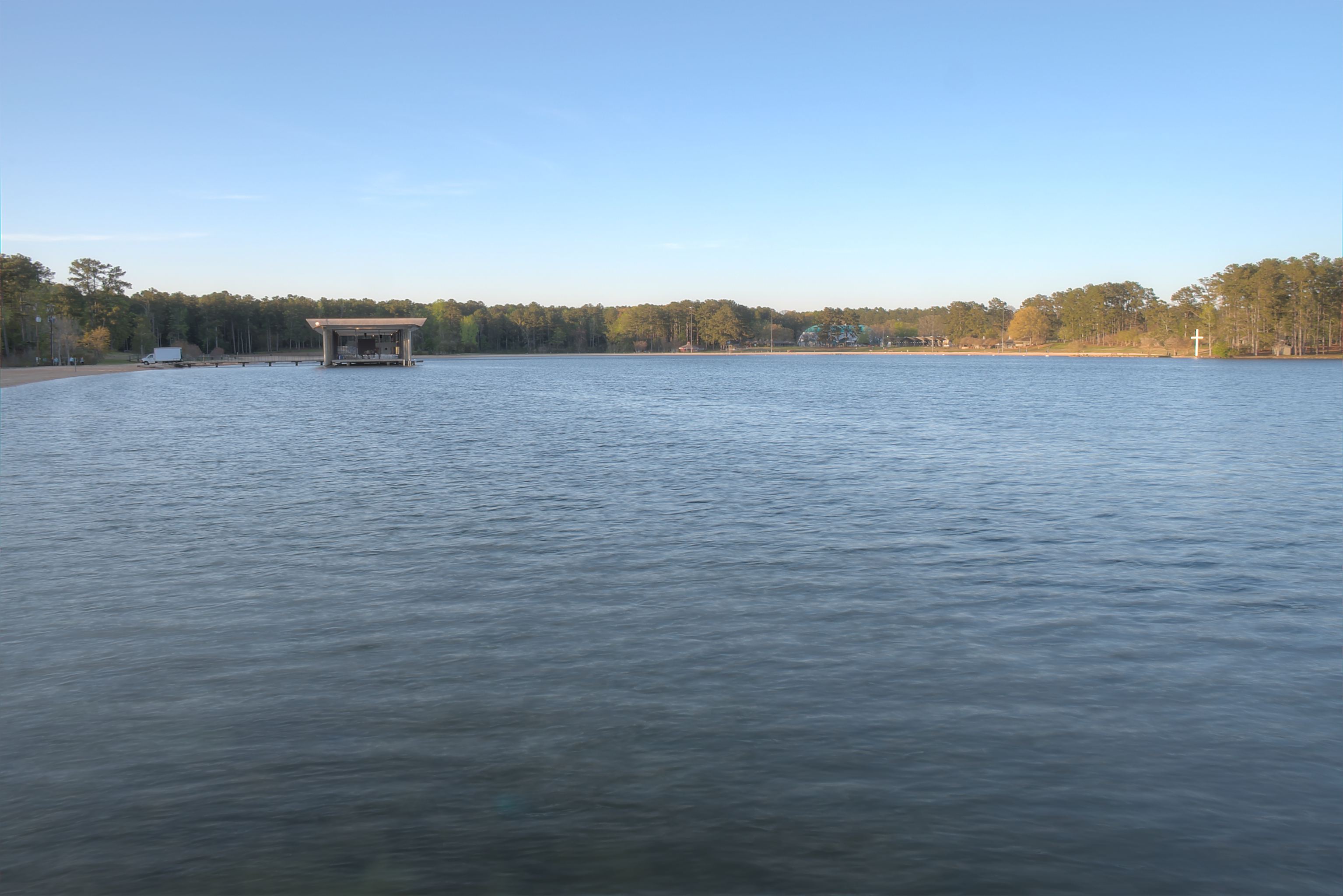
Robin Lake.

Nearly 11 acres (4.5 ha) of pine trees were cut in early 2017 between Robin Lake and the Lodge. It created a clear line of sight between the hotel and the water plus a view of land in the F. D. Roosevelt State Park. Many of the trees were 60 years old, planted in the 1950s, but Cason Callaway did the same thing years prior for the Mountain View Inn. The open area will remain greenspace, have scattered fire pits and hammocks.

Renovation for the 30,000-square-foot (2,800 m^{2}) Lodge conference center was scheduled to begin in late 2019 and be ready in February 2020. The Longleaf Ballroom can accommodate 450-500 people; the Cypress Room holds 75-100 people; the Ironwood Courtyard seats 50-75 people.

=== Lodge at Blue Springs ===
The Lodge at Blue Springs, constructed in the 1930s by Cason J. Callaway, was used by the Callaway family as a vacation home. Local quarried stone was used extensively including the property entrance & gatehouse, pathways, pool & koi pond, plus fireplaces. Built using the Adirondack style and designed by Ivey and Crook, it played host to three US Presidents, including FDR and was listed in the National Register of Historic Places before being left to the Ida Cason Callaway Foundation. Edward Callaway lived there until he moved out in 2015. It is located eight miles (13 km) from Callaway Gardens and not involved with any Garden activity, so the decision was made to list it for sale in 2017 for $5.8 million. The compound featured the five-bedroom house, a guest house, indoor pool and the 14 acres (5.7 ha) Blue Spring-fed Lake Ida on 127 acres (51 ha) plus an additional 1,100 forested acres (450 ha). One quarter of the property's 8,000-square-foot (740 m^{2}) under roof was service space.

The property finally sold in late March 2019 for $1.28 million; the extra acreage was not included in the final sale.

=== Cason Callaway Woodland Estate ===
Another parcel of land acquired by Cason J. Callaway and owned by his family was put on the market for the first time in May 2017. The 7,456 acres (30.17 km^{2}; 11.65 sq mi) Cason Callaway Woodland Estate is being sold for $42.5 million. The property around the estate is owned by Dan Amos, Jeff Foxworthy, Bill Jordan and Joe Rogers Jr., some of whom purchased tracts from the Ida Cason Callaway Foundation.

=== Herschend Family Entertainment ===
Herschend Family Entertainment, doing business as Callaway Gardens Resort, Inc. began managing Callaway Gardens in 2020, shortly after Callaway Gardens President & CEO (and former Herschend employee) William R. "Bill" Doyle, III resigned to return to that company.

On April 6, 2022, a press release announced that Herschend Family Entertainment agreed to purchase the revenue-producing assets of Callaway Gardens from the Ida Cason Callaway Foundation. These include The Lodge & Spa, Conference Center, Golf Courses and Robin Lake Beach. Herschend will also lease and manage the Virginia Hand Callaway Discovery Center, the Ida Cason Memorial Chapel, the Cecil B. Day Butterfly Center and Callaway Gardens. There was no mention of Callaway's 500 employees.

Fran Rogers, Board Chairwoman for the Ida Cason Callaway Foundation, was quoted, "This is an exciting and important milestone for the Foundation — one that assures we can continue our philanthropic efforts in the community and continue Cason and Virginia Callaway’s vision of ‘creating a garden so beautiful that it would make visitors want to go home and lead better lives,’ for generations to come.”.

A quote in that document from Andrew Wexler, CEO of Herschend, stated, "We’re honored to carry on the Callaway legacy by bringing our more than 70 years of experience in destination marketing to further develop Callaway as Georgia’s premier resort destination. We are wholeheartedly committed to preserving and strengthening all that makes Callaway so beloved and special — and look forward to celebrating the area’s natural beauty with a focused effort on world-class events and activities that complement the surrounding landscape."

The release also said that Herschend plans to invest over $20 million in the next five years on renovations and other improvements at Callaway Gardens.

== Attractions ==
=== Trails ===
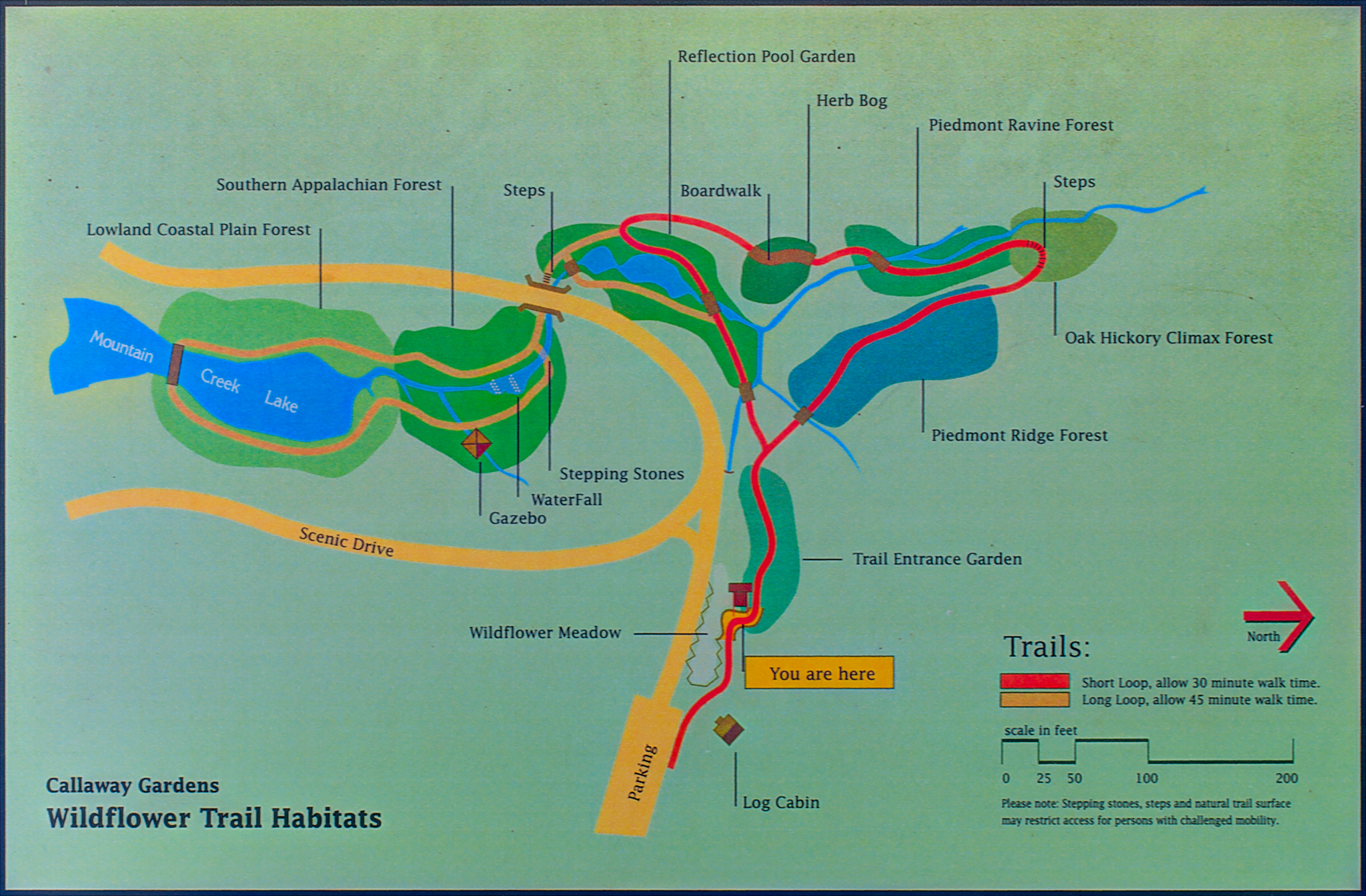
Wildflower Trail Habitats.

The garden has trails both for walking and biking. The Discovery Bike Trail, a 10-mile (16 km) paved trail that weaves through the wooded gardens, provides guests access to all attractions. In early 2017, Callaway upgraded miles of bicycle trails at a cost of $750,000.

- Overlook (Azalea Garden) Trail
- Whippoorwill Lake Trail
- Mountain Creek Lake Trail
- Callaway Brothers Azalea Bowl Trail
- Holly (Meadowlark Garden) Trail
- Lady Bird Johnson Wildflower Trail
- Rhododendron Trail
- Robin Lake Trail

=== Butterfly Center ===
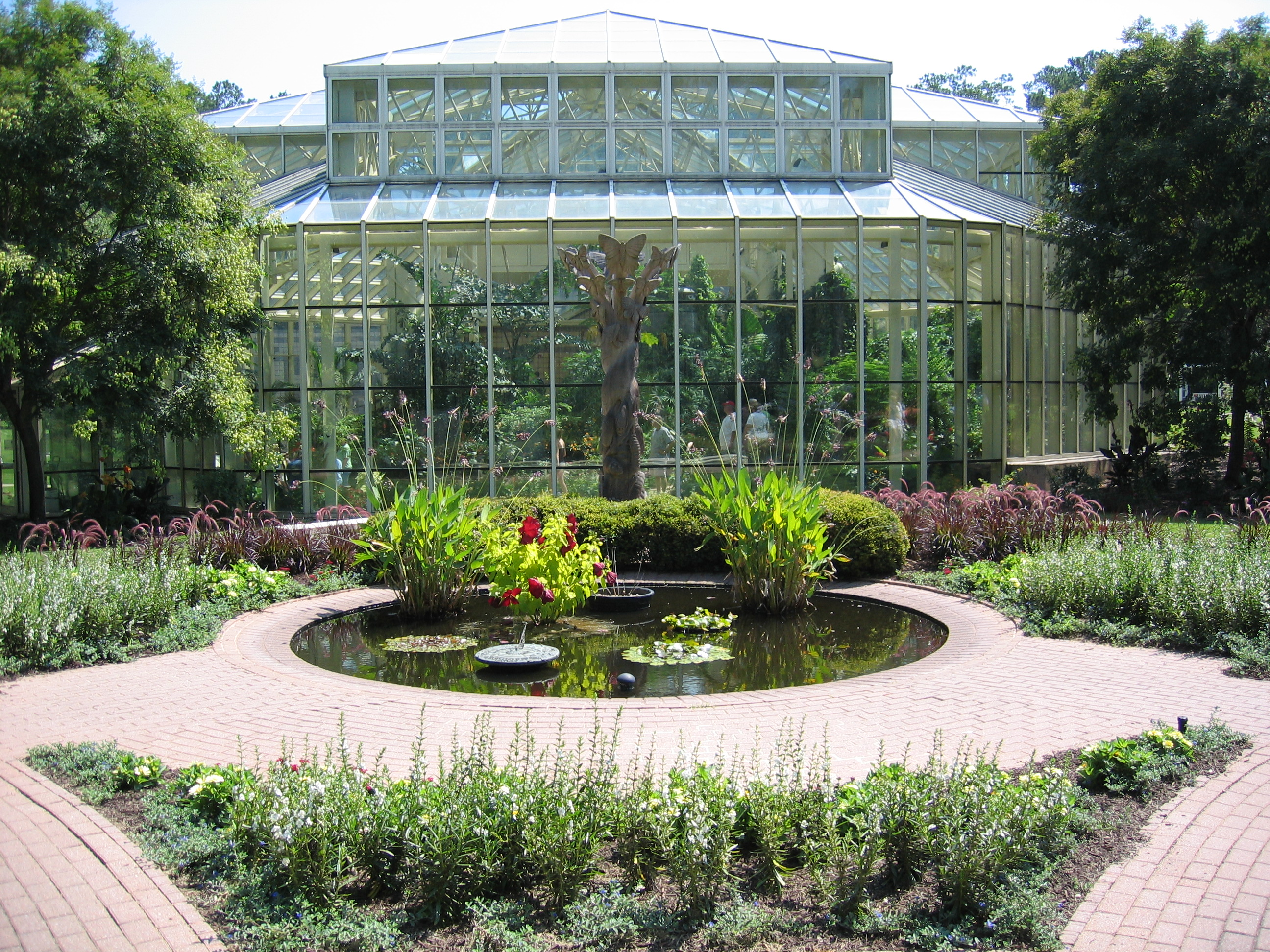
The Day Butterfly Center

The Cecil B. Day Butterfly Center, named after the founder of Days Inns of America, Inc., opened on September 25, 1988. Mrs. Deen Day Sanders, Cecil Day's wife, provided the initial funding for the center. In 2004, the center earned a LEED certification. Guests visit the attraction year-round. In 2005, the Day Butterfly Center underwent a $2 million renovation to accommodate more visitors.

The conservatory is maintained at approximately 80 °F and 74% relative humidity. The center has 1,000 butterflies representing over 50 species. The butterflies are received in the pupa stage (or chrysalis) from Malaysia, the Philippines and Central and South America. Because the butterflies are considered to be invasive species, an inward blast of air is shot by a machine at the doorway to prevent any butterfly breakouts.

=== Golf and tennis ===
Georgia Golf Resort
- Interactive map of Georgia Golf Resort

Club information
- Established: 1951
- Type: Resort
- Total holes: 36
- Tournaments: Buick Southern Open

Mountain View Course
- Designed by: Dick Wilson (1965)
- Par: 70
- Length: 7,057
- Course rating: 73.5
- Course record: 64

Lake View Course
- Designed by: front 9: J.B. McGovern (1951)
- Par: 70
- Length: 6,158
- Course rating: 69.1
- Course record: 64

Sky View Course
- Designed by: front 9: (1968)
- Par: 35

Gardens View Course
- Designed by: front 9: (1968)

As of 2022, Callaway Gardens had two golf courses in operation. The Lake View Course was opened on May 21, 1952, the same day the gardens opened. The Mountain View Course, designed in 1965, hosted the Buick Challenge from 1991 to 2002. In 2001, Buick pulled its sponsorship of the tournament because of low attendance and little network coverage. A third course, the Gardens View Course, was opened in 1969 but was closed in 2002.

=== TreeTop Adventure ===
This attraction opened in May 2011 and combines a Zip line with an Obstacle Course. The 25 "games" run over 3,000 feet (910 m) in length. Instructors review tethering and safety before going to the course, but participants move their own carabiner clips while on the course.

The attraction was expanded in 2013. The Sapling Course is for young children; the Discovery Course is more advanced and the Lake Course is challenging and includes two land zip lines and three water zip lines which range between 200 and 700 feet (61 and 213 m). A spiral staircase rises 70 feet (21 m) up.

=== Birds of Prey ===
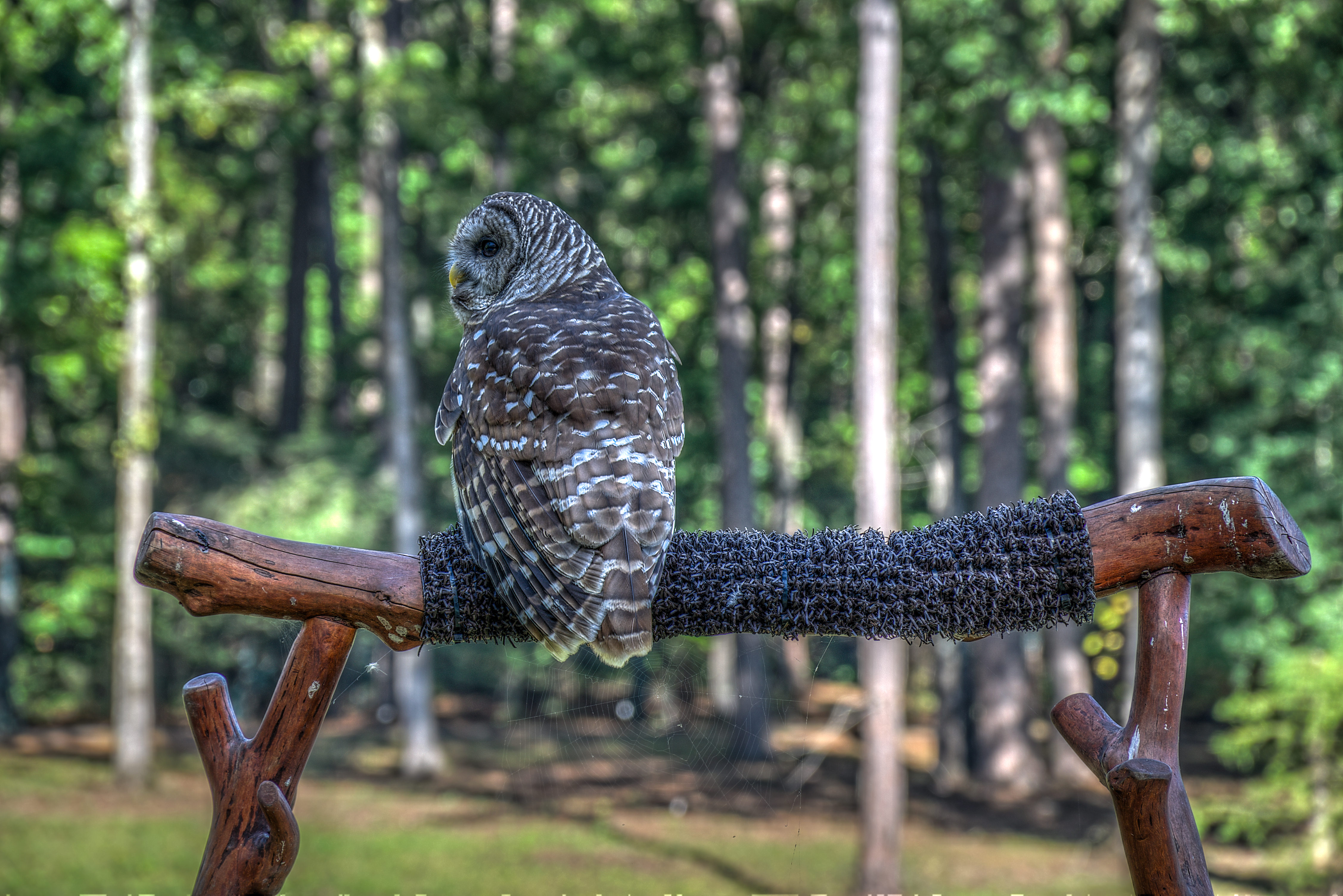
Barred Owl at Birds of Prey Show

The Birds of Prey Show is presented several times a day at the Discovery Amphitheater. In the mid-1990s, the Earthquest company was contracted to conduct shows during the Summer season. In 2000, the Discovery Amphitheater was constructed along with hawk mews and the flight tower. Earthquest began performing more shows until 2005, when Callaway Gardens decided to hire their own staff and do it themselves.

Callaway's birds come to them injured or are human imprinted, which means they never learned to survive in the wild. Raptors are federally protected, so Callaway is permitted to keep and use the birds for conservation education. Show attendees can learn about different raptors from a bird handler and see them fly from their aviary to perches around the arena, then receive a reward. The audience is cautioned not to stand up or raise their hands while the birds are being flown to avoid collisions and/or injury to the birds and spectators. The show usually lasts less than an hour and includes at least one hawk and an owl.

=== Chapel ===
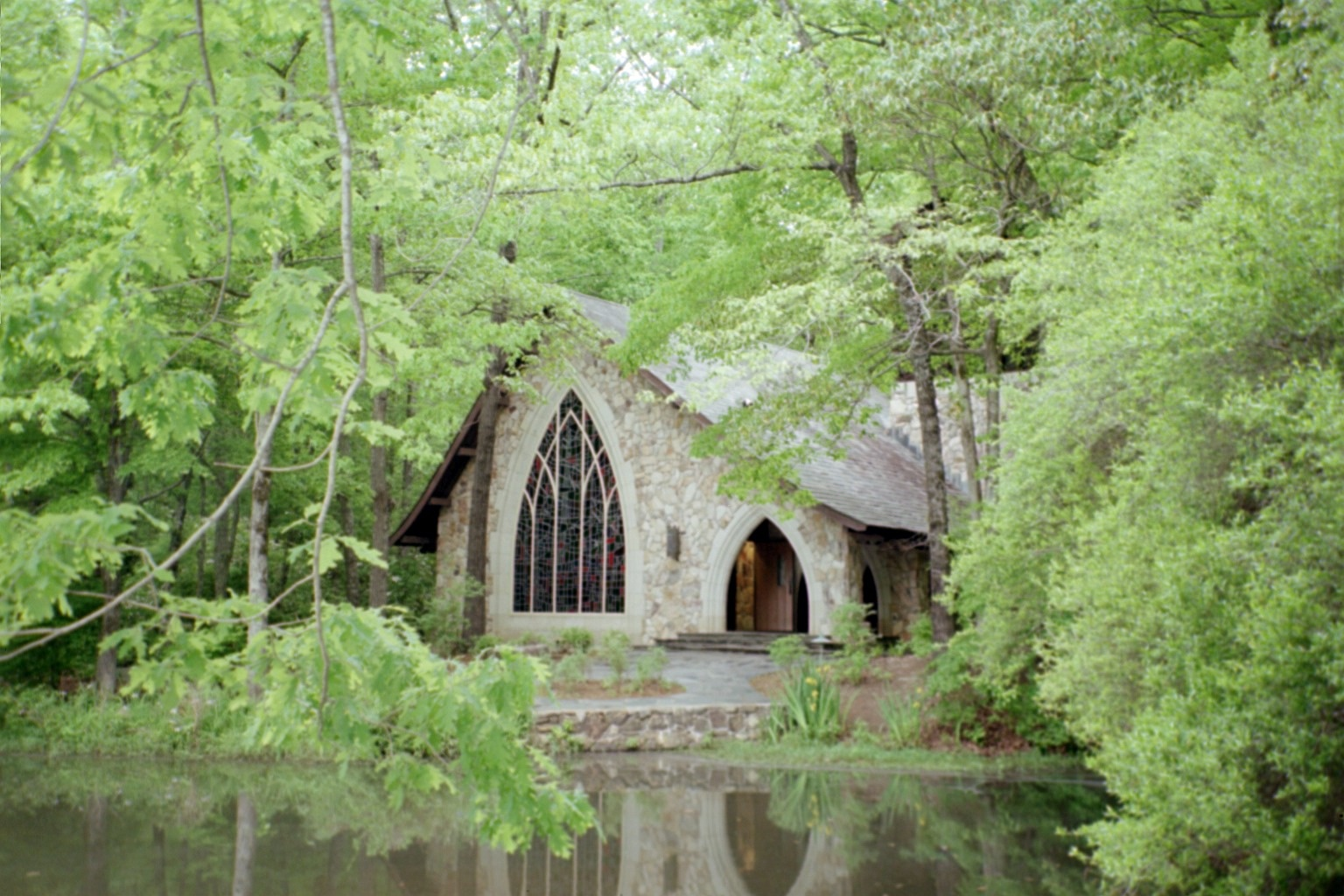
Ida Cason Callaway Chapel

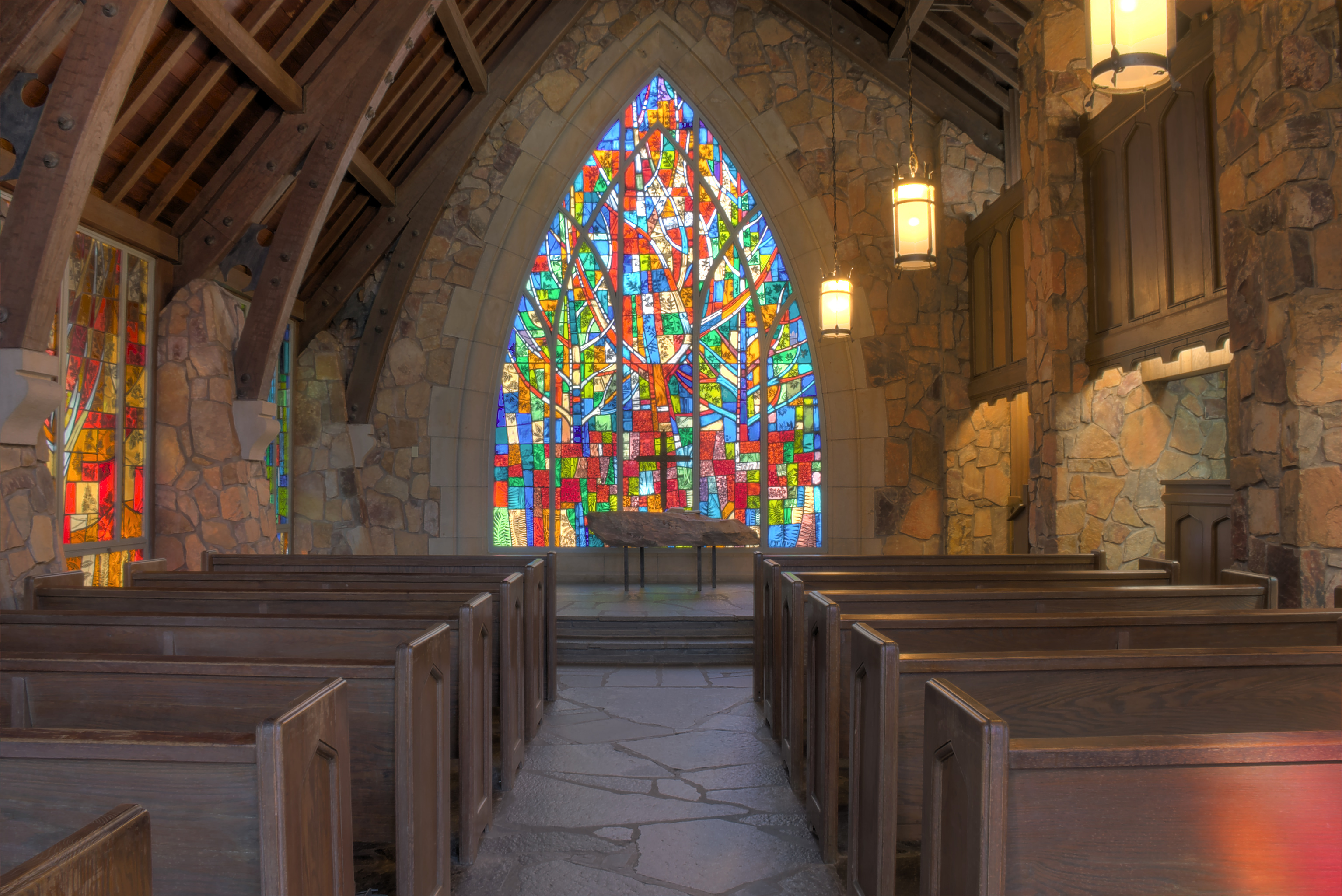
Memorial Chapel (inside)

Situated on the shore of Falls Creek Lake, the Ida Cason Callaway Memorial Chapel was built to honor Cason J. Callaway's mother. It was dedicated on April 12, 1962 by Dr. Norman Vincent Peale, "to the glory of God, and in loving memory of Ida Cason Callaway." Constructed using regional materials such as fieldstone quartz, massive pine beams and a slate roof, it was inspired by Gothic architecture. The stained glass windows depict a forest through the four seasons. The chapel was rededicated in 1990. A majestic Möller pipe organ is used for seasonal concerts, weekend services during the Summer and at Christmas, plus weekend afternoons from 2 to 4 PM. Randall Smith has been the principal organist at the Chapel since 2008. The pipe tower on the right side of the chapel has 1,229 organ pipes. The chapel is a popular location for small wedding ceremonies but seats only 50 people.

== Former attractions ==
=== Vegetable Garden ===
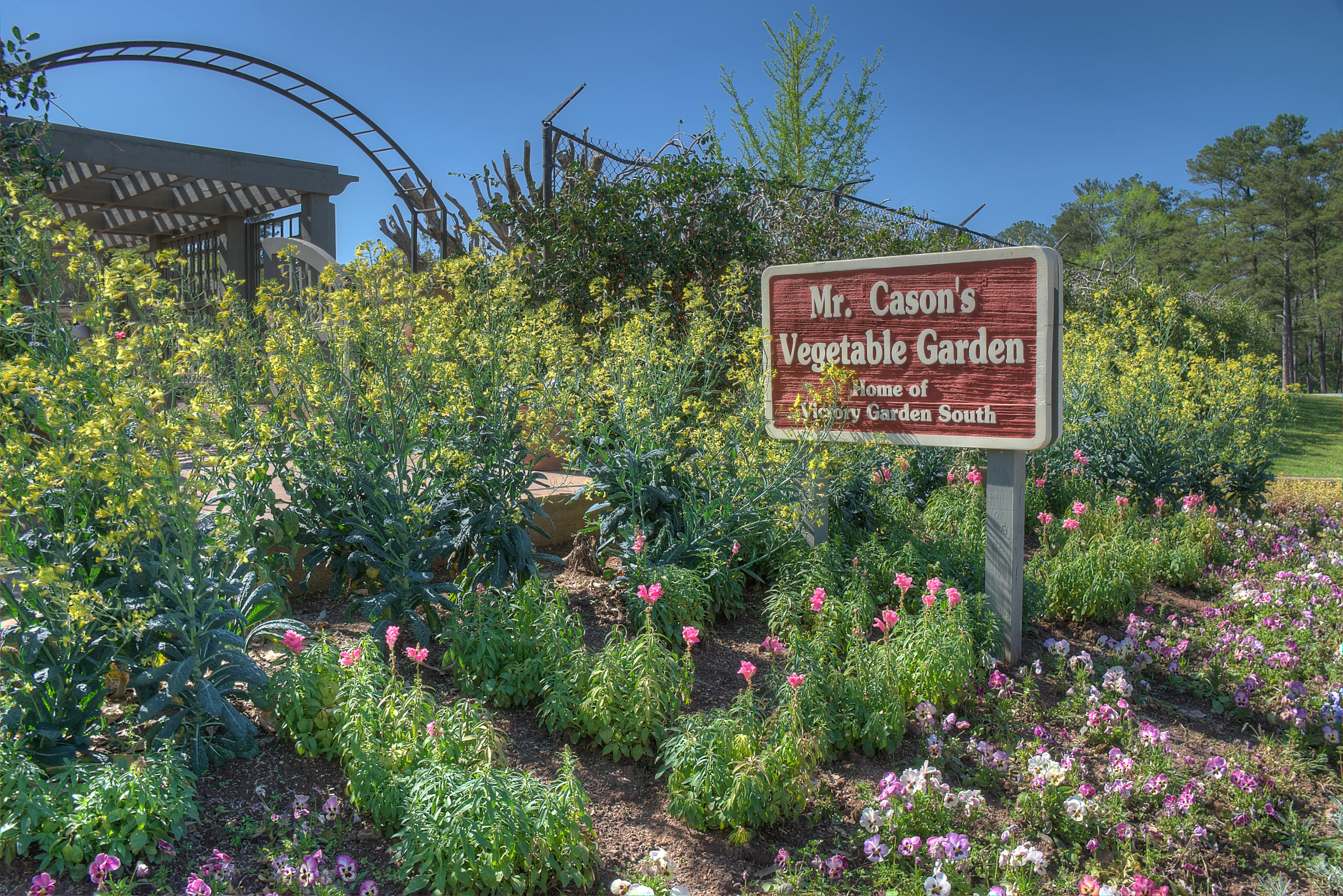
Mr. Cason's Vegetable Garden

Mr. Cason's Vegetable Garden was started in 1960 and named for Cason Callaway after his death in 1961. He said, "This is going to be the most productive 7½ acres, with the largest number of varieties of fruits and vegetables in the Southeast." The goal was to provide a demonstration garden that would show visitors how and what to grow in their own gardens. As of 1965, the garden provided much of the produce for restaurants serving Callaway Gardens. The attraction was the location for years of television shows about growing vegetable gardens, most notably the southern edition of The Victory Garden on PBS. The Home Demonstration Garden was honored by Barbara Bush in 1990 with a National Landscape Award.

Due to declining popularity and cost-cutting measures, the attraction was permanently closed October 26, 2015. A November 2, 2015, article in the Atlanta Business Chronicle stated, "There are plans to move the garden elsewhere, but a decision has not yet been made regarding the location and size." In a November 9, 2015, Columbus Ledger-Enquirer article, then-President & CEO Bill Doyle said the vegetable garden land might end up being the site of a golf course clubhouse or a hotel or both. As of April 2022, no additional plans had been announced.

=== Horticultural Center ===
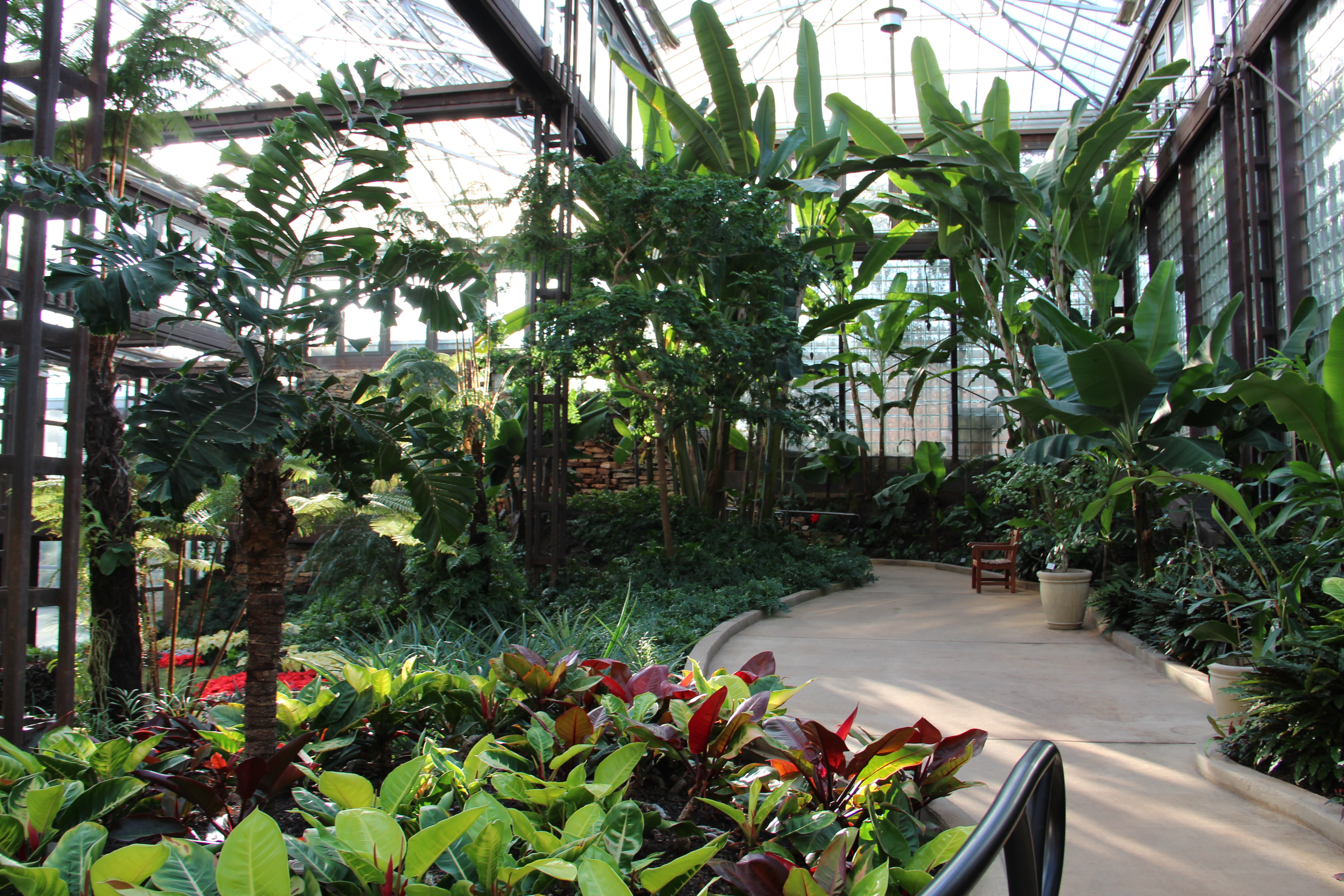
Inside Sibley Horticultural Center

The grand opening of the 52,000-square-foot (4,800 m^{2}) John A. Sibley Horticultural Center was March 22, 1984, and something was always in bloom. The center's namesake was a Georgia banker, Callaway Gardens trustee, conservation advocate and friend of the Callaway family. The attraction was originally funded by private donations from people who knew John Sibley. Because the center contained a production greenhouse and was a top display conservatory, their research, internship and educational programs had a profound impact over 30+ years. Callaway Gardens promoted it as "one of the most advanced garden/greenhouse complexes in the world".

The goal of the Sibley Horticultural Center was "an expression of man working in harmony with nature while addressing the needs and wants of both plants and people".

The facility was permanently closed on November 12, 2015.

=== Mountain Creek Inn ===
Mountain Creek Inn was originally a 274-room Holiday Inn off U.S. 27 built in the late 1950s. Around 1980 it was purchased by Callaway Gardens and renamed the Mountain Creek Inn. Later, the Conference Center was created along with the Mountain Creek Ballrooms. The Longleaf Ballroom could accommodate 450-500 people; the Cypress Room's capacity was 100 people; the Ironwood Courtyard perhaps 75 persons. In 2011 CEO Edward Callaway said the facility looked “old and tired,” attracting neither individuals or group travelers.From late 2012 to 2014 a $2.5 million in renovations was spent at the Mountain Creek Inn to upgrade rooms and the lobby.

Renovation for the 30,000 sq ft (2,800 m^{2}) Lodge conference center was scheduled to begin in late 2019 and be ready in February 2020. Three buildings were demolished eliminating 115 hotel rooms. The facility once contained two swimming pools. The smaller pool sat right outside what was then called the Plantation Room Restaurant which was replaced with a paved courtyard and a koi pond.

=== Cottages ===
The cottages in the 1980s were a small community for families, with a teen center, pizza parlor and large pool. Each had a full kitchen, BBQ grill and screened porch. However, it was two miles from the Mountain Creek Inn where many activities were held. Those included movies, game nights and theater productions from the La Grange College drama students. The original golf clubhouse became the Gardens Restaurant.

== Seasonal events ==
Callaway Gardens annually hosts quite a few seasonal events depicted in the table below. There are other events that have been held including: Sip & Savor, a four-day food and drink festival; Callaway Marathon/Half Marathon/5k/Kids Fun Run; Atlanta Symphony Orchestra concert; Free Admission on Founders Day; Organ concerts at the Memorial Chapel; Free Fireworks shows; Concerts featuring Travis Tritt, Parmalee, 38 Special, The Beach Boys and Foghat;

Event	Jan	Feb	Mar	Apr	May	Jun	Jul	Aug	Sep	Oct	Nov	Dec	Dates	Began
Spring Flower Fest													March thru May	1960
Annual Plant Sale													Last March weekend	1980
Easter Egg Hunt & Sunrise service													Easter weekend	2013
Masters Water Ski & Wakeboard Tournament													Memorial Day Weekend	1959
FSU Flying High Circus													June thru August	1961
Family Adventures Program													June thru August	1960
Sky High Hot Air Balloon Festival													Labor Day weekend	1999
RC Model Boat & Seaplane Regatta													2nd weekend in September	2008
Pumpkins at Callaway Fall Harvest Festival													Mid-September thru Halloween	2008
Blue Morpho Butterfly Month & Festival													September	
The Steeplechase at Callaway Gardens													1st weekend in November	1985
Fantasy in Lights													November thru December	1992
Maintenance window													1st two weeks of January	

== Gallery ==
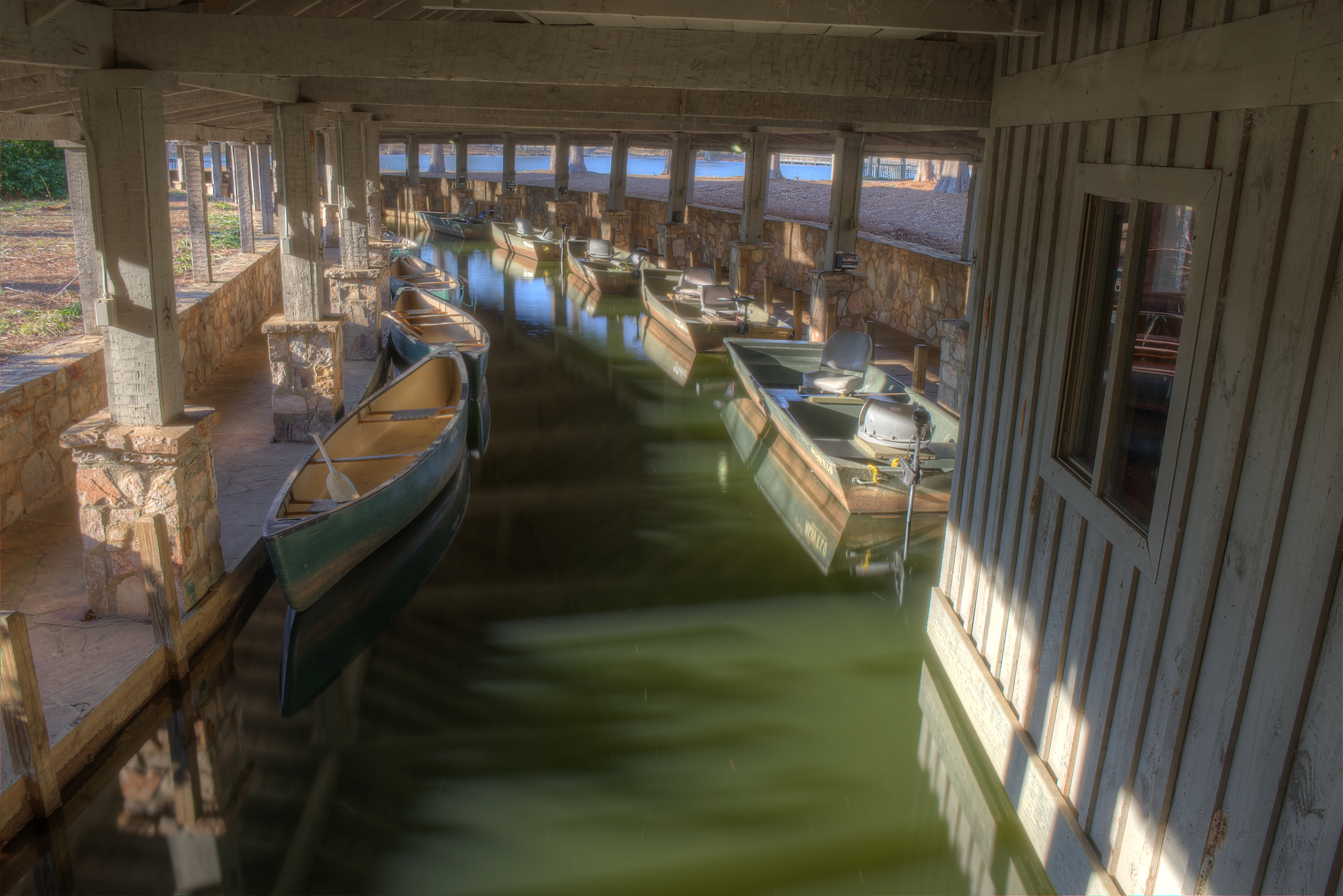
Boat House

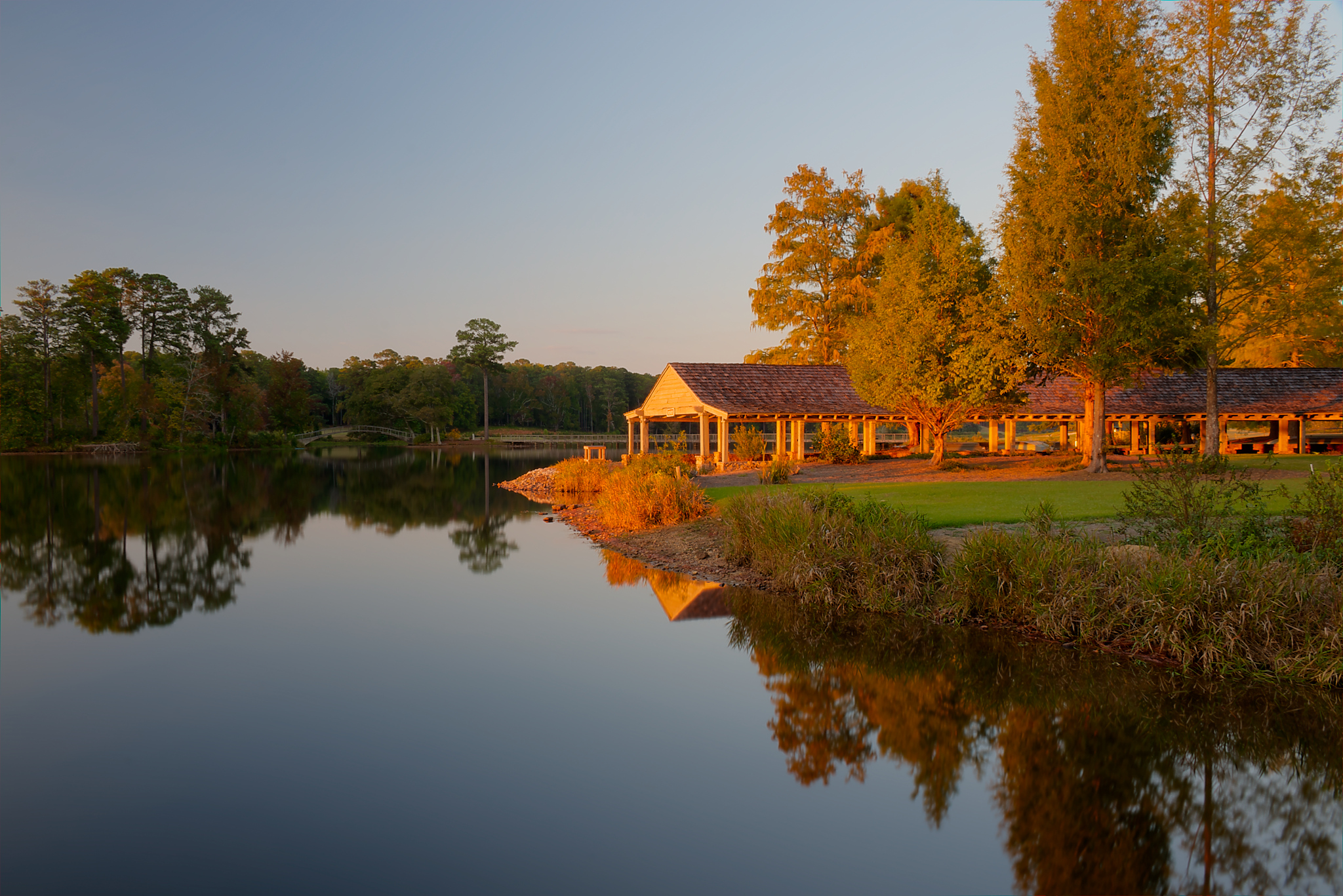
Mountain Creek Lake

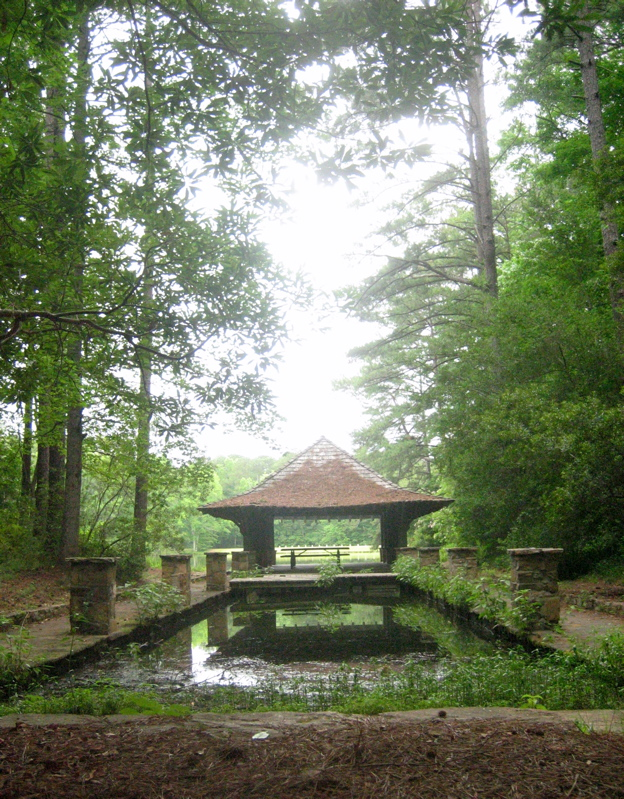
Pavilion by the lake at Overlook Gardens

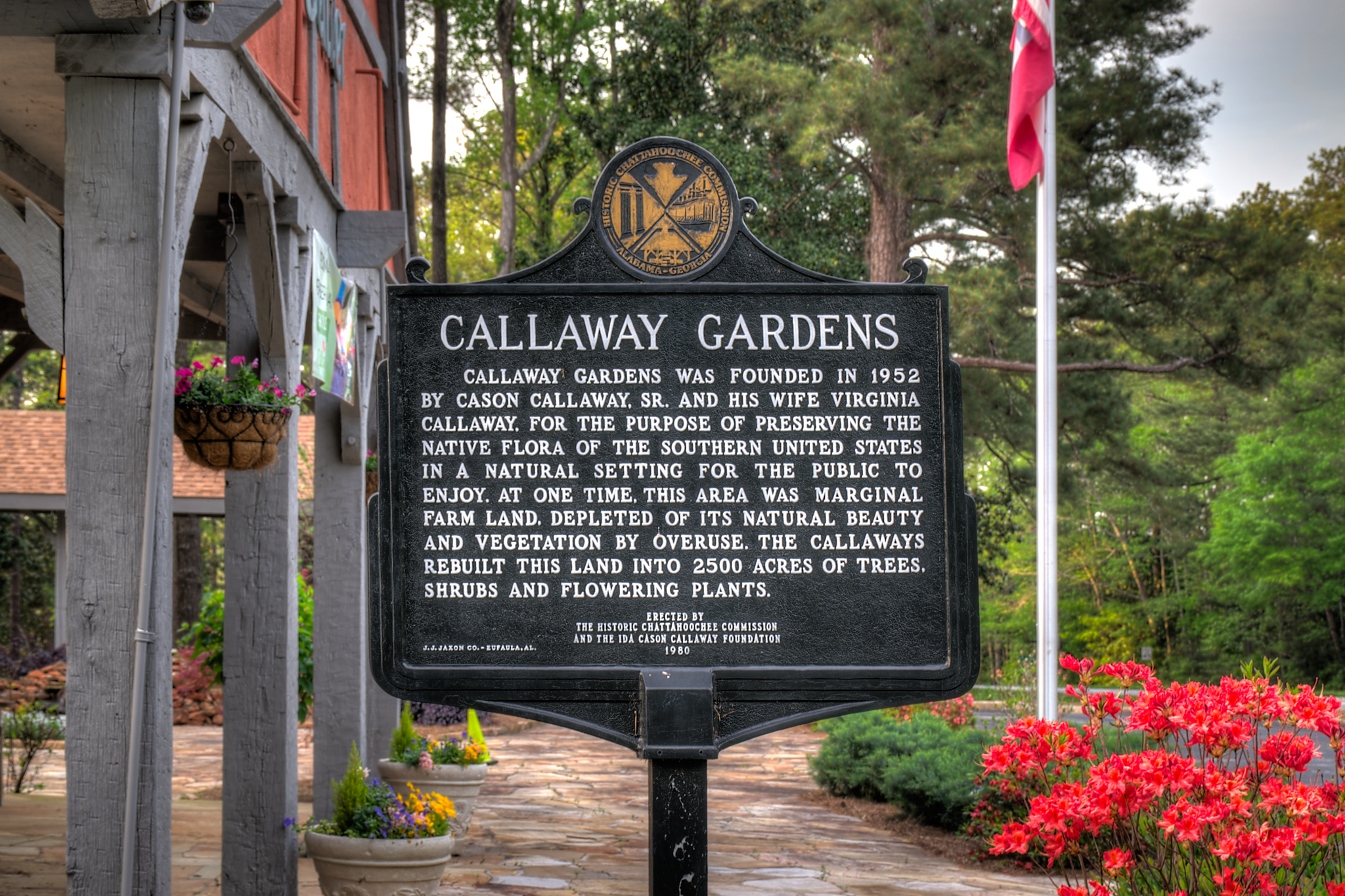
Historic marker

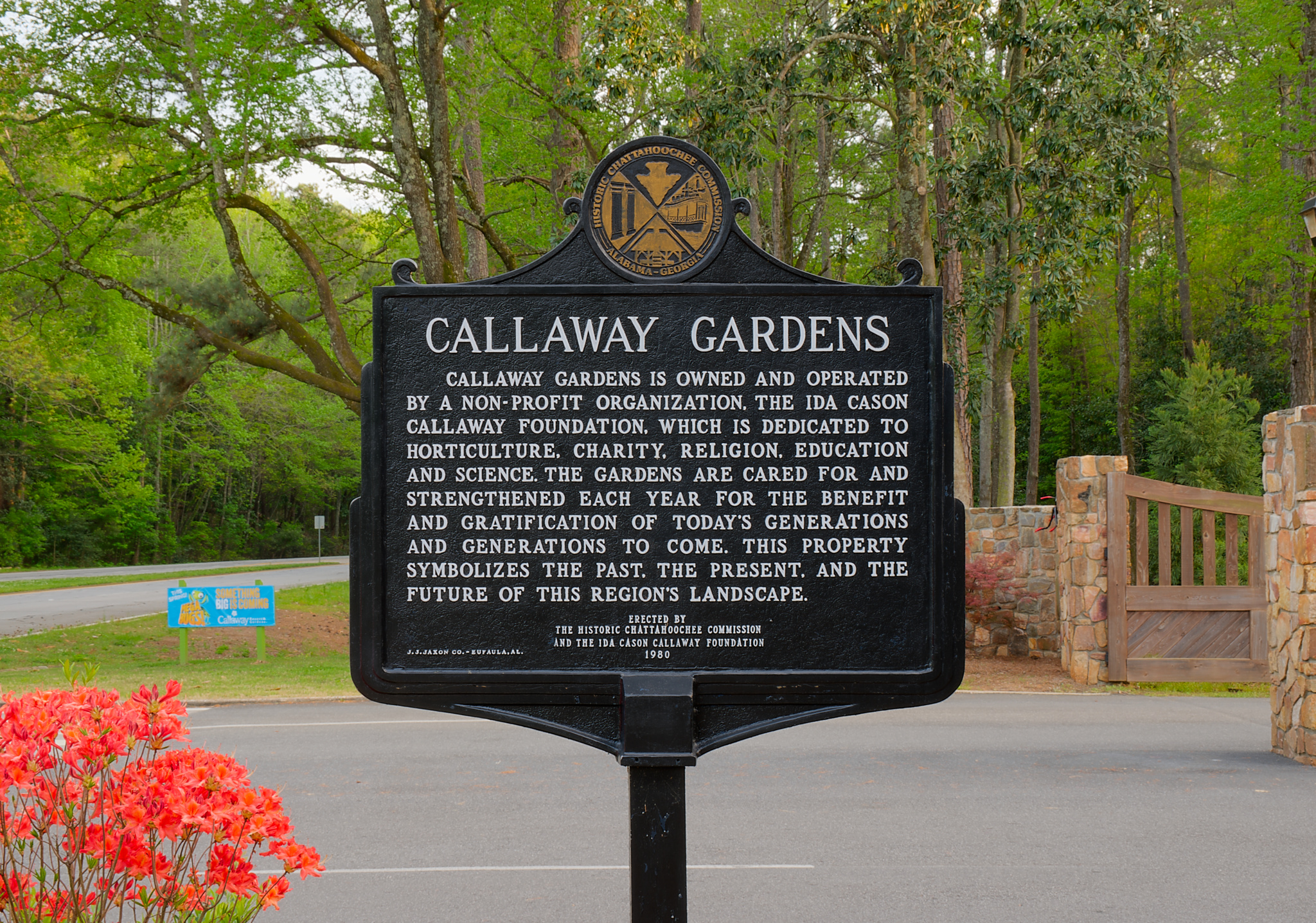
Historic marker

== See also ==
- List of botanical gardens in the United States
