= Mary Norton Kratt =

American author (born 1937)

Mary Norton Kratt (born June 7, 1937) is an American author. She focuses on Southern history.

== Early life ==
She was born in West Virginia. She attended Charlotte Central High School, Agnes Scott College and University of North Carolina at Charlotte where she received a degree in English literature.

== Career ==
Kratt has published 17 books of poetry, history and biography, mostly pertaining to the Charlotte area. She wrote two walking tours of uptown Charlotte and works closely with the Levine Museum of the New South.

Kratt served on the Speakers Bureau of the North Carolina Humanities Council.

== Recognition ==
She twice won the Blumenthal Writers and Readers Series. In 1994, she won the Ethel Fortner Award from St. Andrews Presbyterian College. In 2000, her book Small Potatoes won the North Carolina Poetry Society Brockman-Campbell Book Award.

== Selected works ==
- Legacy the Myers Park Story ISBN 978-0318221922
- Charlotte, North Carolina: A Brief History ISBN 978-1596296015
- Southern Is... ISBN 978-1561451135
- Remembering Charlotte: Postcards for a New South City, 1905–1950 ISBN 978-0807848715
- A Bird in the House; The Story of Wing Haven Garden ISBN 978-0962869204
- Marney ISBN 978-0962869204
- Charlotte: Spirit of the New South ISBN 978-0895870957
- My Dear Miss Eva ISBN 978-0962594700
- A Little Charlotte Scrapbook
- On The Steep Side
- New South Women: Twentieth Century Women of Charlotte, North Carolina ISBN 978-0895872500
- Small Potatoes ISBN 978-1879934405
- The imaginative spirit: Literary heritage of Charlotte and Mecklenburg County, North Carolina ISBN 978-0962059704
- The Only Thing I Fear is a Cow and a Drunken Man ISBN 978-0932112293
