= Joe Rogers (businessman) =

American businessman (1919–2017)

- Born: Joseph Wilson Rogers; November 30, 1919; Jackson, Tennessee, U.S.
- Died: March 3, 2017 (aged 97); Atlanta, Georgia, U.S.
- Occupation: Businessman
- Known for: co-founder and former CEO of Waffle House
- Spouse: Ruth Jolley Rogers
- Children: 4, including Joe Rogers Jr.

Joseph Wilson Rogers (November 30, 1919 – March 3, 2017) was an American businessman. He was co-founder and former CEO of the Waffle House franchise restaurant chain, which began business in 1955 in Georgia, and has grown to over 2,100 locations in 25 states.

== Early years ==
Born in 1919 in Jackson, Tennessee, he grew up there at 291 W. Deaderick Street, and graduated from Jackson High School in 1938. During World War II Rogers served in the United States Army Air Corps as a B-24 pilot reaching the rank of captain.

Rogers started in the restaurant business as a short-order cook in 1947, at the Toddle House in New Haven, Connecticut. By 1949, he had become a regional manager with the now-defunct Memphis-based restaurant chain, and moved to Atlanta. There he met Tom Forkner, whom he bought a house from in the Atlanta suburb of Avondale Estates.

Forkner pressed Rogers to go into business together for a quick-service, sit-down restaurant in Avondale. Forkner later recalled Rogers telling him, "You build a restaurant and I’ll show you how to run it." Forkner suggested a Toddle House, but Rogers felt the chain wasn't proper for the market. After Forkner secured the property, the pair developed the concept of the Waffle House together: Forkner proposed the name, while Rogers suggested keeping a 24-hour schedule.

== Waffle House ==
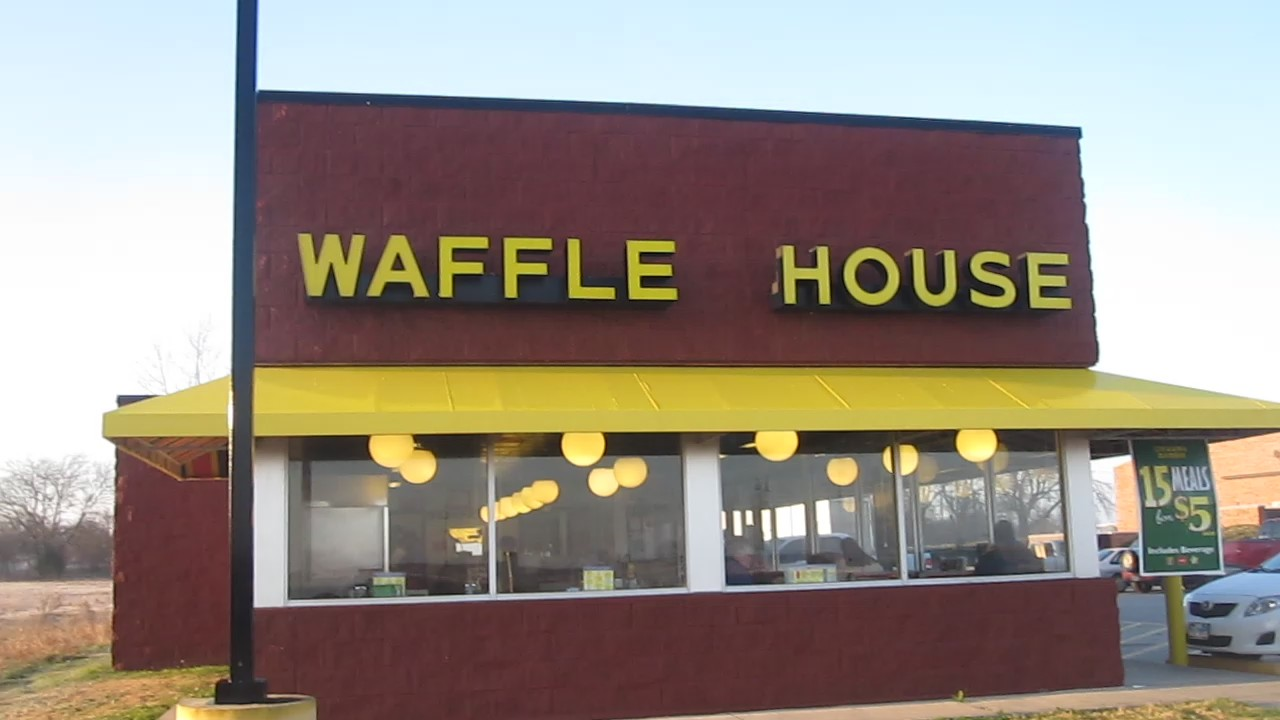
This Waffle House in Fort Worth, Texas, is near the Texas Motor Speedway

The first Waffle House opened on Labor Day weekend 1955, at 2719 East College Avenue in Avondale Estates, Georgia. The restaurant was named after the most profitable item on the 16 item menu. The fragile nature of waffles also made the point that it was a dine-in, not a carry-out, restaurant, but it confused patrons as to meal availability other than breakfast.

Rogers continued to work with Toddle House, and to avoid conflict of interest sold his interest to Forkner in 1956. In 1960, when Rogers asked to buy into Toddle House, and they refused, he moved back to Atlanta and rejoined Waffle House, now a chain of three restaurants, to run restaurant operations. Shortly after Rogers returned full-time, Forkner followed suit and left Ben S. Forkner Realty.

After opening a fourth restaurant in 1960, the company began franchising its restaurants and slowly grew to 27 stores by the late 1960s, before growth accelerated. As of 2017, there are over 2,100 locations in 25 states. The company is privately held and doesn't disclose annual sales figures, but says they serve 2% of the eggs used in the nation's food service industry. The founders limited their involvement in management, Joe Rogers Jr. is Chairman, and Walt Ehmer is president and CEO.

== Personal life ==
He was married to Ruth Jolley Rogers for 74 years, and she survived him. They had four children, two girls and two boys, and their eldest son, Joe Rogers Jr. became CEO of Waffle House in 1973.

== Death ==
Rogers died on March 3, 2017, at the age of 97 in Atlanta.
