= Walter G. Ehmer =

American businessman (1966–2024)

Walt Ehmer
- Born: May 26, 1966; New Jersey, U.S.
- Died: September 6, 2024 (aged 58); Sandy Springs, Georgia, U.S.
- Education: Georgia Institute of Technology (BS)
- Known for: CEO of Waffle House
- Predecessor: Joe Rogers Jr.
- Successor: Joe Rogers III
- Spouse: Kara Petracek
- Children: 3

Walter George Ehmer (May 26, 1966 – September 6, 2024) was an American businessman. He was the president, chief executive officer and chairman of Waffle House from 2012 until his death in 2024.

== Life and career ==
Ehmer was born on May 26, 1966, in New Jersey. He graduated from the Georgia Institute of Technology in 1989 with a Bachelor of Science in Industrial Engineering. Ehmer began his career at Allen-Bradley.

Ehmer joined Waffle House in 1992. He was appointed vice president of finance in 1999, chief financial officer in 2001, president in 2006, CEO in 2012, and chairman in 2022.

Ehmer was on the board of directors of Aaron's, Inc., as well as a member of the board of trustees for the Atlanta Police Foundation.

In response to the COVID-19 pandemic in the United States, Ehmer announced in a letter to employees that to allow the company more cash flow, he would voluntarily reduce his pay to half its normal rate while Joe Rogers Jr. would be forgoing any and all compensation for his work with the company.

In 2023, Ehmer was diagnosed with pancreatic cancer. He died from complications of a treatment for his cancer on September 6, 2024, at the age of 58.
