= Joe Rogers Jr. =

Former CEO of Waffle House

- Born: Joseph W. Rogers Jr. 1950 or 1951 (age 75–76); Jackson, Tennessee, US
- Occupation: Businessman
- Known for: chairman and former CEO of Waffle House
- Successor: Walter G. Ehmer
- Spouse: Fran Maynard
- Parent(s): Joe Rogers Sr. Ruth Jolley Rogers

Joe Rogers Jr. (born 1950/1951) is an American businessman, and the chairman and former CEO of Waffle House, a franchise restaurant chain co-founded by his father Joe Rogers Sr.

== Early life ==
He was born in Jackson, Tennessee, the eldest of four children of Joe Rogers Sr. and his wife, Ruth Jolley Rogers.

== Career ==
In 1973, Rogers was appointed CEO of Waffle House. He was succeeded in 2012 by Walter G. Ehmer.

Rogers is the chairman of Waffle House.

== Personal life ==
In 2006, Rogers married Fran Maynard.

In 2018 and 2019, Rogers was involved in a sex tape case with a former housekeeper. When the case reached the jury trial stage, a confidential settlement between parties resolved the case during opening statements.
