= Fortner =

Fortner is a surname. Notable people with the surname include:

- Ethel Fortner (1907–1987), American poet
- Jack Fortner, Member of the Arkansas House of Representatives
- Johann Fortner (1884–1947), German general
- Mike Fortner, American politician
- Nell Fortner (born 1959), American women's basketball coach
- Ron Fortner (1941–2003), American talk radio host and television news anchor
- Wolfgang Fortner (1907–1987), German classical composer and conductor

== See also ==
- Fortner Mounds, Native American mounds in Fairfield County, Ohio, United States
- Anschütz 1827 Fortner, a rifle designed by Peter Fortner junior
