= Tom Forkner =

American businessman

- Born: Thomas Francis Forkner; June 14, 1918; Hawkinsville, Georgia, U.S.
- Died: April 26, 2017 (aged 98); Johns Creek, Georgia, U.S.
- Occupations: Lawyer, real estate agent, businessman
- Known for: co-founder of Waffle House, amateur golfer
- Board member of: Young Harris College Trustee
- Spouse: Martha Jean Bishop Forkner (m. 1945; died 2017)

Thomas Francis Forkner (June 14, 1918 – April 26, 2017) was an American businessman, lawyer, and notable senior golfer. He was a co-founder of restaurant chain Waffle House, which as of April 2018 consisted of 2,100 restaurants.

== Biography ==
Born in Hawkinsville, Georgia, on June 14, 1918, Tom Forkner was the fifth of seven children of Ben and Bessie Forkner; his siblings include Louise, Lawrence, Catherine, Ben, John, and William. Forkner graduated Young Harris Junior College before getting a law degree from the Woodrow Wilson College of Law and passing the bar. The son of a real estate agent, he briefly practiced law in Atlanta.

=== Military service ===
He was drafted to serve in World War II where he trained at Camp Ritchie and is considered to be one of the Ritchie Boys. That group responsible for uncovering two thirds of intelligence in the European Theatre. Forkner was assigned to Counter Intelligence Corps conducting missions to test the security at military bases, like a red cell team. Another assignment involved transporting "merchandise" or "product" from Oak Ridge, Tennessee, to Los Alamos, New Mexico. Forkner followed a truck on a defined route through the mountains bypassing big cities. They drove non-stop for 53 hours, stopping only for gas and food. As the only officer, he was in charge but was told little about the trips or cargo. His orders were, "Lose it, and you’d better be dead.” He spent two years undercover, posing in units as a painter, mechanic or electrician, investigating problems before writing reports to his superiors. His final post was an intelligence officer for the Manhattan Project in New York City. Forkner spent four years, nine months in the war.

=== Real estate ===
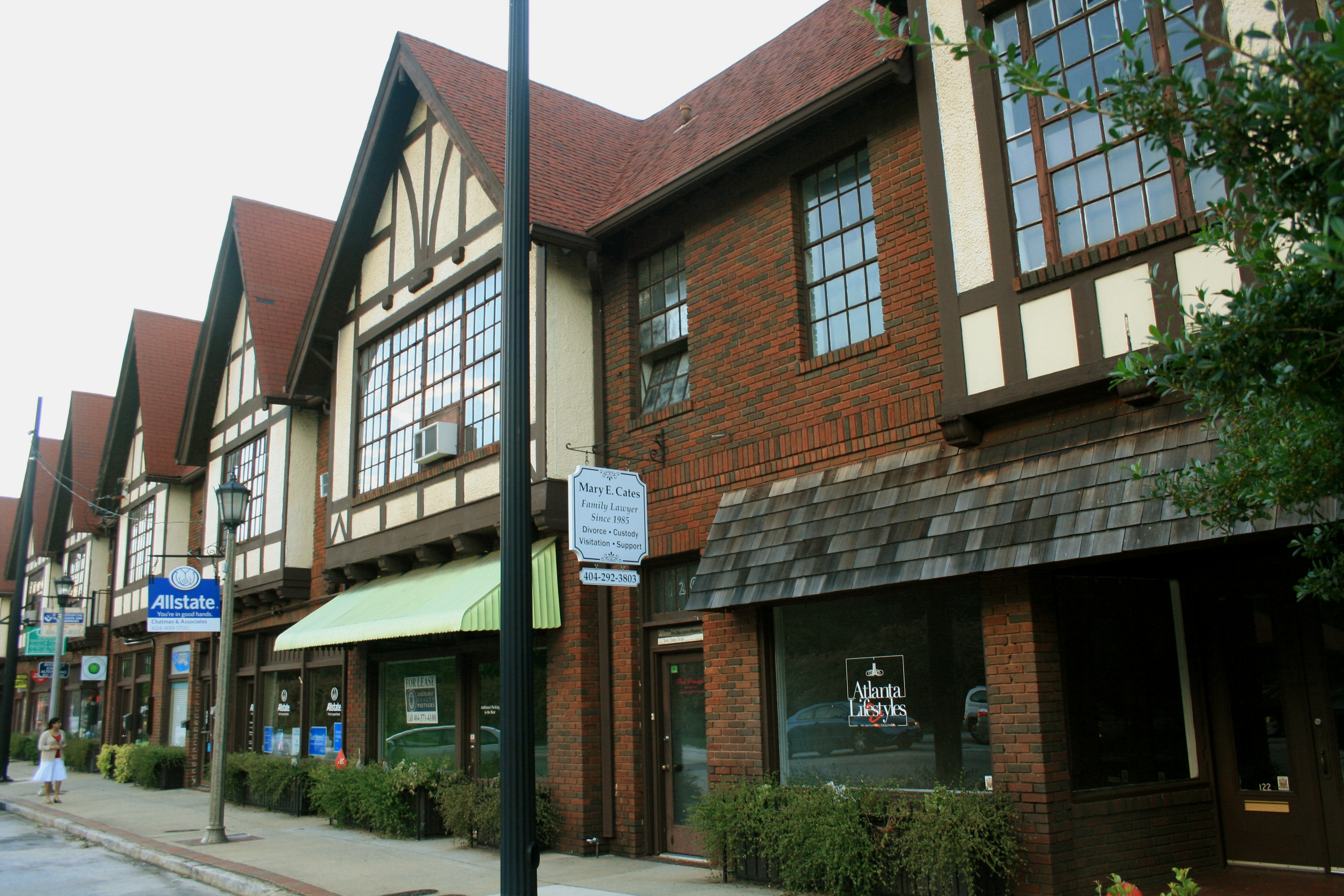
Avondale Estates founded 1924

Tom's father Ben Senior founded Forkner Realty Company in 1933 after nine years as Superintendent and General Manager of Avondale Estates, Georgia. Ben Junior was company secretary but was killed in the Pacific during World War II.

Tom Forkner returned to Avondale Estates with his wife and took over Forkner Realty Company after his father's death in 1948. For a time, he was president of the "DeKalb County Board of Realtors". He was appointed to appraise and acquire the land for all of DeKalb County's interstate highways including Stone Mountain Freeway, Interstate 285 and Interstate 20. After his health scare in 1959 Tom stopped doing appraisals and his brother John took over the family real estate business.

== Waffle House ==
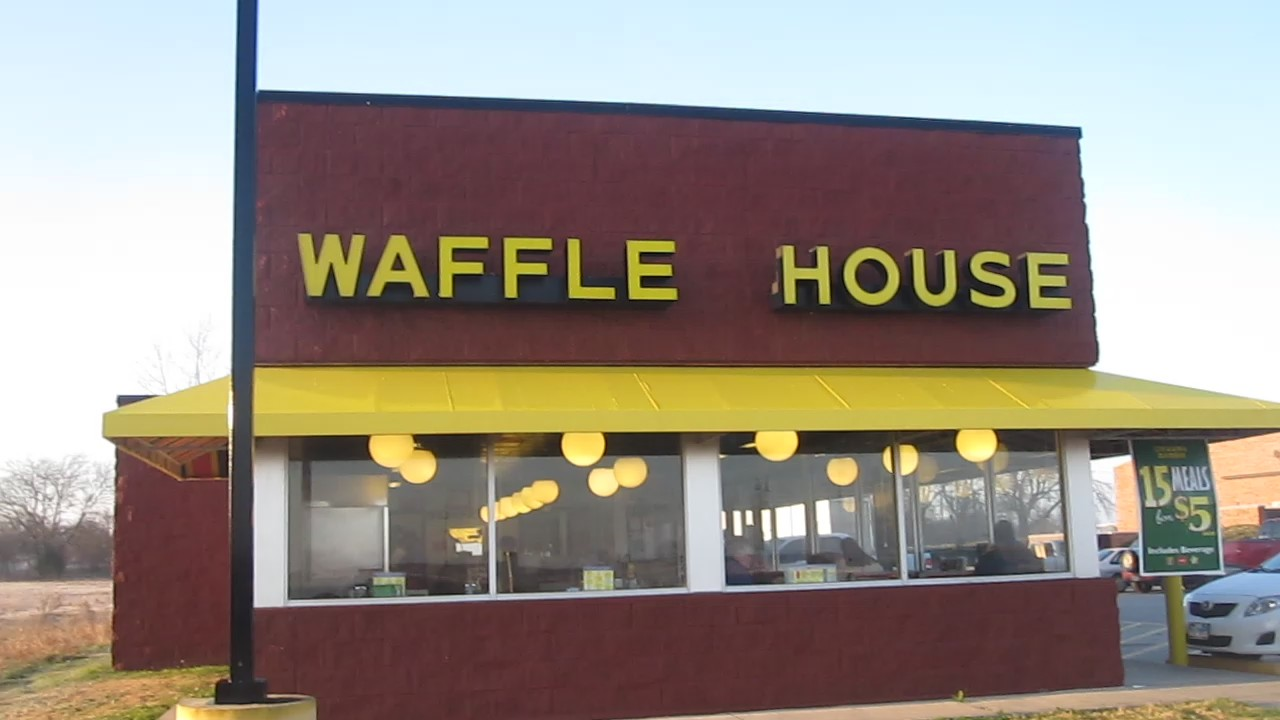
This Waffle House in Fort Worth, Texas, is near the Texas Motor Speedway

In 1949, Forkner sold a home to Joe Rogers Sr. Inspired by the emergence of fast food chains like McDonald's, Rogers, who was a regional manager of the Toddle House chain of diners in Memphis, Tennessee, proposed that he and Forkner go into business together for a quick-service, sit-down restaurant. Forkner suggested a Toddle House, but Rogers felt the chain wasn't proper for the market. After Forkner secured the property, the pair developed the concept of the Waffle House together: Forkner proposed naming it after the most profitable item on the menu to promote it, while Rogers suggested keeping a 24-hour schedule. The first Waffle House opened in Avondale on Labor Day in 1955. Over the next several years, the pair expanded the chain, beginning to offer franchises after 1960. After their restaurant count passed 400 in the early 1970s, they began to step back. As of 2005, Forkner and Rogers, though having passed the helm of the company to Joe Rogers Jr. in 1973, still worked for the company occasionally, including on major holidays. In 2007, Forkner was still visiting his office daily.

== Golf ==
Forkner started golfing as part of a lifestyle change after high blood pressure and ulcers put him in the hospital in 1959 when he was 41 years old. He and wife Martha enjoyed Sunday golf for years. He was widely successful as a senior golfer, and on January 6, 2007, was inducted into the Georgia Golf Hall of Fame. Among his achievements, he was on four occasions named the Georgia Senior Champion (1968, 1969, and 1986) and twice International Senior Champion (1974 and 1980). In 2003 and 2004, he was World Super Seniors Champion for ages 80 and Over. Forkner, who competed in the 1980 and 1981 U.S. Senior Opens, once placed second there, which in keeping in mind the competition he described to The Augusta Chronicle in 2007 as "probably the single best thing I ever did."

== Personal life and death ==
While at Oak Ridge in 1945, he met Martha Jean Bishop. She was from Gainesville Florida, graduated from Florida State College for Women in three years with honors, and was recruited for the Manhattan Project. They married on September 20, 1945 in Gainesville after a three-month courtship. The union bore three children and the marriage lasted 71 years. She enjoyed being a wife and mother but learned to design homes and created house plans for four homes. In her spare time she played bridge, golfed and enjoyed decorating. As of 2007, the Forkners lived in Duluth, Georgia. Forkner died on April 27, 2017, at the age of 98, 54 days after his wife and one month after the death of Joe Rogers, his business partner.
