= Ethel Fortner Awards =

American writing award

The Ethel Fortner Awards are named for writer Ethel Fortner. The awards recognize persons who have been outstanding contributors to the writing community. They were created in 1986 by St. Andrews Presbyterian College in Laurinburg, North Carolina. The awards occur annually in November or December.

== Recipients ==
- Charleen Whisnant Swansea (1986)
- Martha Gibson (1987)
- Elizabeth Stevenson Ives (1988)
- Mary Belle Campbell / Grace L. Gibson (1989)
- Rolfe Neill / Roy Park / Roy Parker, Jr. (1990)
- Geneva Overholser (1991)
- Ann Deagon / Charles Joyner / Yoko Mishima (1992)
- Charles Edward Eaton / Gladys Owings Hughes (1993) / Robert M. Scott (1993)
- Margaret Boothe Baddour / William C. Friday / Mary Kratt (1994)
- John M. Ehle, Jr. / Evalyn Pierpoint Gill / Frank Borden Hanes (1995)
- Betty Hodges / W.D. White / Emily Herring Wilson (1996)
- Doris Betts / Susan Ketchin / John Foster West (1997)
- Charles Fort / Judy Goldman / Elizabeth Spencer (1998)
- Eleanor Brawley / Michael Mott / Tom Patterson (1999)
- Frank Barrows / Stevie Daniels / John Robinson (2000)
- David Bunn / Rebecca Copeland / Robert Creeley / Hiroaki Sato / Beth Copeland Vargo (2001)
- John Craig / Kemp Gregory / Glenna Luschei / Heather Ross Miller (2002)
- Robert Busko / Paul Dosal / Marie Gilbert (2003)
- Barbara Epler / Terrence Grimes / Mary Regan (2004)
- Alan Hines (2005)
- Theodore Enslin / Howard McCord / Lindsay Thompson (2006)
- Nancy Bradberry / Dot Coble / Todd Davis / Robert Malloy (2007)
- Jean Arthur Jones, Tanya Olson, Jody Page, Carlos Reyes (2008)
- William Blackley (2011)
- Elizabeth Hudson (2014)
