= Toddle House =

United States restaurant chain

Toddle House advertisement

Toddle House was a national quick service restaurant chain in the United States, which specialized in breakfast but was open 24/7. Lunch and dinner entrées included soups and salads and various sandwiches. Much of their business was takeout.

== History ==
The precursor to Toddle House was started in the late 1920s, by J. C. Stedman, a lumberman from Houston, Texas, seeking to use leftover building supplies. Stedman persuaded the owners of Britling Cafeterias, a restaurant chain that started a few years earlier, to build his restaurants. Shortly thereafter, Stedman was approached by a successful Memphis businessman named James Frederick "Fred" Smith, who was looking for a new investment since the Greyhound Corporation had bought a controlling interest in the Smith Motor Coach Company he founded 1931, and was renamed as the Dixie Greyhound Lines. (Smith was the father of Frederick Wallace Smith, who later founded FedEx.)

In 1932, Smith became the president of the National Toddle House System, Inc. By the 1950s, Toddle House had more than 200 locations in almost 90 cities.

In 1962, Toddle House was purchased by Dobbs Houses, a competitor that also operated Steak 'n Egg Kitchen, and the franchise was allowed to decline. In 1980, retail conglomerate Carson Pirie Scott borrowed $108 million to buy Dobbs Houses. In January 1988, Carson Pirie Scott sold Steak 'n Egg Kitchen and Toddle House to Diversified Hospitality Group of Milford, Connecticut. In June 2026, the last Steak 'N Egg Diner closed in Washington, D.C.

== Business model overview ==
=== Original restaurant ===
Each outlet was built to the same plan, having the appearance of a small brick cottage, painted white with a blue roof. Inside, diners found no tables — just a row of 10 stools at a stainless-steel counter. Customers paid on the honor system, depositing their checks with the correct amount in a glass box by the door on their way out.

At its peak there were more than 300 of the first version, however, they disappeared in 1962 when they were converted to Dobbs Houses and then Steak N' Eggs. (Note that there is at least one news report that puts the total over 1,000.)

Joe Rogers Sr., a regional manager of the Toddle House chain, left Toddle House to found the similar Waffle House. William Cecil Davis, also a regional manager for the Toddle House, founded the Pitt Grill with his brother, Leonard, while still working for the Toddle House, prior to the Waffle House founding in 1955.

During the segregation era, the company also operated a parallel chain of similar restaurants for African-Americans called "Harlem House".

=== Second iteration ===
In 1981 Carson Pirie Scott, the retail/food giant, sold Steak N' Eggs and began to build a "new" Toddle House chain. By 1987 there were 40 Toddle Houses open, with five of them in Tampa and at least one in Orlando. There were ambitious plans that called for 500 by 1991, with 50 of them in Florida.

The "new" Toddle Houses were bigger, with 64 seats, although still situated around a counter. The menu still featured breakfast along with old standbys of burgers and black bottom pie, but was modestly updated, adding pork chops and country-fried steak and fajitas.

However, Carson came on hard times and sold its restaurants in 1988.

== After life ==
Many defunct Toddle House locations lived on for decades as other quick service restaurants, such as hot dog stands and other short-order formats. Waffle House pays tribute to its predecessor by using the Toddle House name for its omelets.

== External sites ==
YouTube video on the history of Toddle House
