= Ethel Fortner =

American poet

Ethel Nestell Fortner (11 February 1907 – 16 April 1987) was an accomplished poet, critic and editor. She was born in Aspen, Colorado, the second child of Sam and Ida Nestell. She had five siblings. During her childhood, she lived in or near small coal mining towns.

== Career ==
At Columbia University in New York, Fortner earned a Master of Arts degree, which qualified her to receive a provisional teacher's certificate. Her first use of it was, at the age of 19, teaching in a log cabin style one-room schoolhouse, a position she held for two years. She then attended Western State College in Gunnison for a year (1927–1928), earning her a lifetime teaching certification for the state of Colorado, which she used to work instructing in a mining camp.

However, she was ready for something different. So in 1931 she moved to Oregon, accepting a position in Salem teaching at the historic Oregon School for the Blind. Here she would teach and become principal during her 12-year stay. She would also become married to Laurence Wilbur Fortner (1912–1982), a fellow teacher, and receive a BA in psychology from the University of Oregon, both in 1937.

Her next position, lasting until some time after World War II, was as Vision Supervisor in the Oregon State Department of Education. She left this to join her husband (who was then working for the Veteran's Administration) for a year in Seattle.

The Fortners moved to a farm close to Estacada, Oregon; Ethel began teaching and administrating again for thirteen more years before retiring.

== Retirement and second career ==
Now Fortner spent her time on other, more personal interests, most notably her poetry, and painting in water colors. She had composed poetry for her own pleasure since 1927, only now committing herself to writing for others. She finally published one poem, in 1962 in the newspaper The Oregonian; the poem entitled "December Morning". She became editor of Human Voice Quarterly.

Fortner eventually published above two hundred poems, in various periodicals and also in four collections, and received the first place award in the Oregon State Poetry Association contest in 1964. and the "Voice of the Year" publication awards in 1967. She contributed prolifically to the St. Andrews Review and was instrumental in the early funding of the St. Andrews College Press of St. Andrews Presbyterian College. The Ethel Fortner Award was instituted in her honor in 1986. Fortner is interred at Willamette National Cemetery in Portland, Oregon. Her grave marker is also her late husband's, who preceded her in death by a little over four years.

Selected works

- A sudden clarity (1967)
- Clouds and keepings (1973)
- Nervous on the curves (1982)
