= Waffle House =

American restaurant chain

Waffle House, Inc.
- Trade name: Waffle House
- Type: Private
- Industry: Restaurants
- Genre: Casual dining
- Founded: September 5, 1955; 71 years ago Avondale Estates, Georgia, United States
- Founders: Joe Rogers; Tom Forkner
- Headquarters: Norcross, Georgia, United States
- Number of locations: 2,021 (April 2025)
- Area served: 25 U.S. states
- Products: Waffles, breakfast food, sandwiches
- Revenue: ▲$1 billion
- Number of employees: 40,000
- Subsidiaries: WH Capital, L.L.C.
- Website: wafflehouse.com

Waffle House, Inc. is an American restaurant chain with over 2,000 locations in 25 states in the United States. The bulk of the locations are in the Midwest and the South, where the chain is a regional cultural icon. The menu consists mainly of Southern breakfast food. Waffle House is headquartered in Norcross, Georgia, in the Atlanta metropolitan area.

== History ==
=== Founding ===
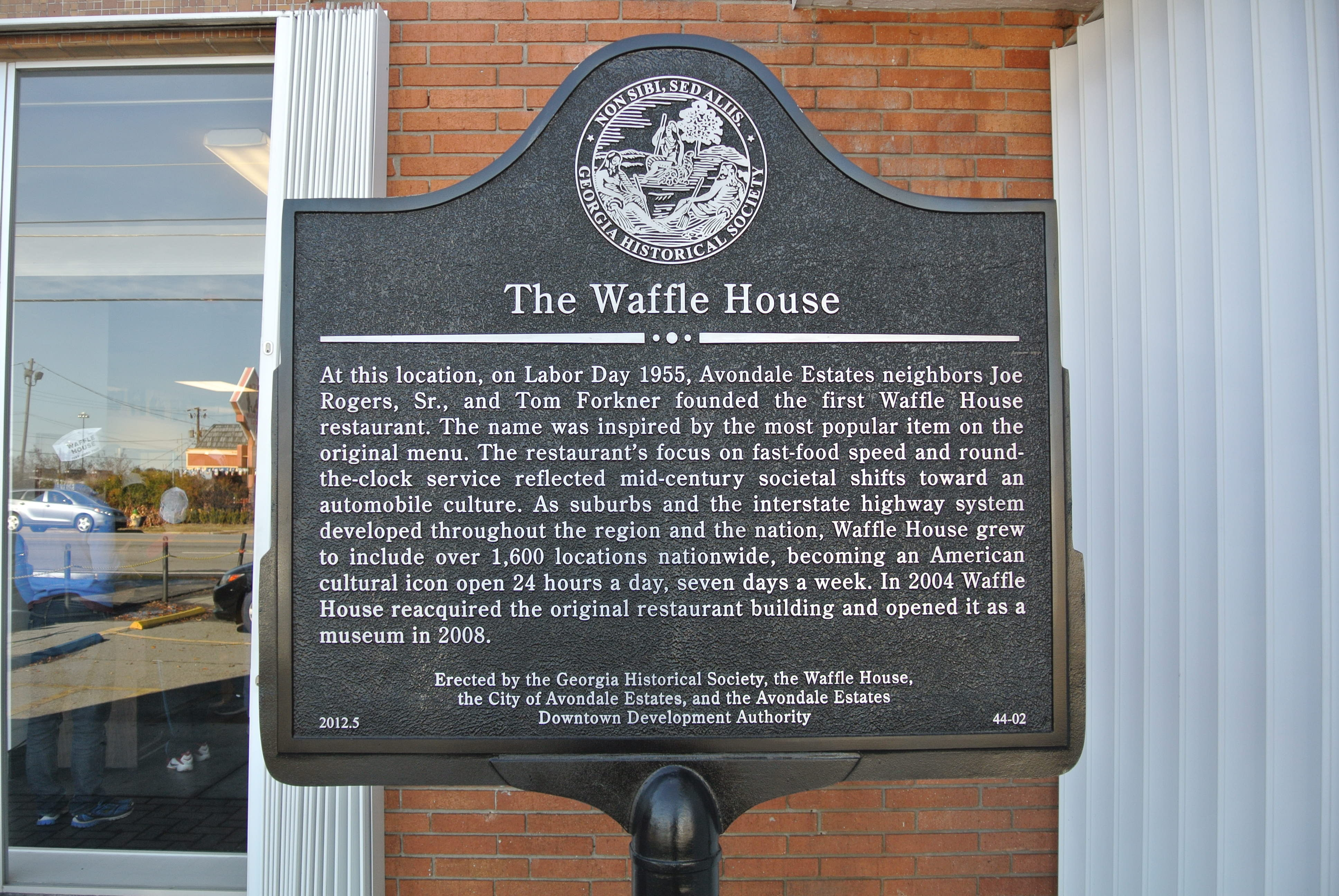
Plaque showing the first Waffle House restaurant

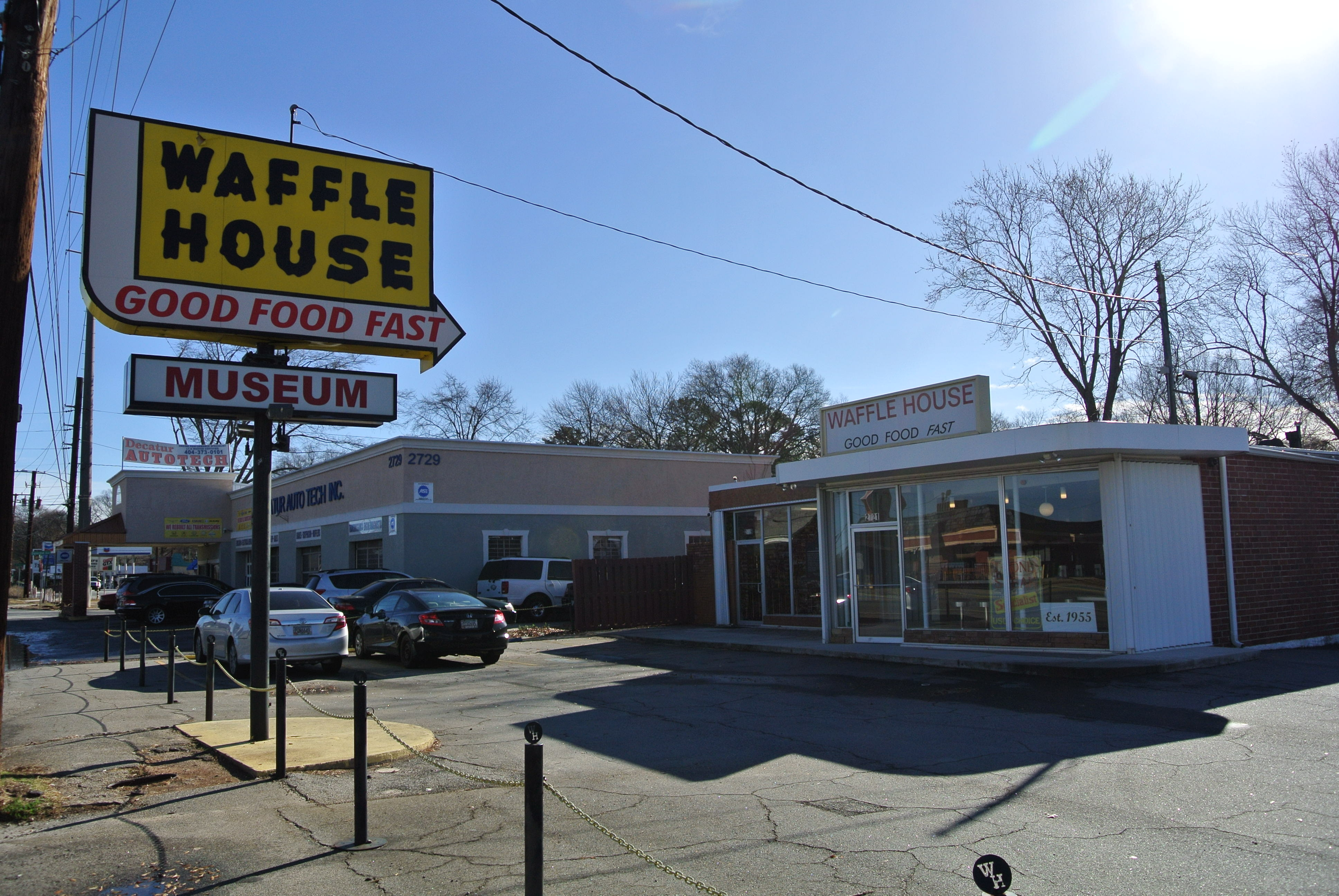
The first Waffle House restaurant (now a museum), Avondale Estates, Georgia. Note original "syrupy" font on the sign.

The first Waffle House opened on Labor Day weekend in 1955 at the location 2719 East College Avenue in Avondale Estates, Georgia. That restaurant was conceived and founded by Joe Rogers Sr. and Tom Forkner. Rogers started in the restaurant business as a short-order cook in 1947 at the Toddle House in New Haven, Connecticut. By 1949, he had become a regional manager with the now-defunct Memphis-based Toddle House chain. He then moved to Atlanta, where he met Tom Forkner while buying a house from him in Avondale Estates.

Rogers's concept was to combine the speed of fast food with table service with around-the-clock availability. Forkner suggested naming the restaurant "Waffle House", as waffles were the most profitable item on the 16-item menu. Rogers continued to work with Toddle House, and, to avoid conflict of interest, sold his interest to Forkner in 1956.

=== 1960s–1990s ===
In 1960, Rogers asked to buy into Toddle House, and was subsequently refused. Afterwards, he moved back to Atlanta and rejoined Waffle House, now a chain of three restaurants, to run restaurant operations. Shortly after Rogers returned full-time, Forkner followed suit and left Ben S. Forkner Realty.

After opening a fourth restaurant in 1960, the company began franchising its restaurants and slowly grew to 27 stores by the late 1960s, before growth accelerated.

=== Since 2000 ===
In 2007, Waffle House repurchased the original restaurant, which had been sold by the chain in the early 1970s. The company restored it using original blueprints for use as a private company museum. The museum is used primarily for internal corporate events and tours.

In 2008, one of the biggest Waffle House franchises in the southeast, North Lake Foods, was bought out by Waffle House, Inc. North Lake Foods filed for Chapter 11 bankruptcy protection and closed some stores. Waffle House, Inc. plans to rehabilitate the franchise. In early 2009, East Coast Waffles bought North Lake Foods to become a new franchise.

The founders of the Waffle House brand died in 2017 within two months of each other: Joe Rogers Sr. died on March 3 and Tom Forkner on April 26. On September 8, 2024, it was reported that Walter G. Ehmer, who oversaw Waffle House since 2012, had died.

In 2025, Waffle House introduced canned cold brew as a new "all-star" to its lineup as a limited run in nine locations, all of which are in Atlanta.

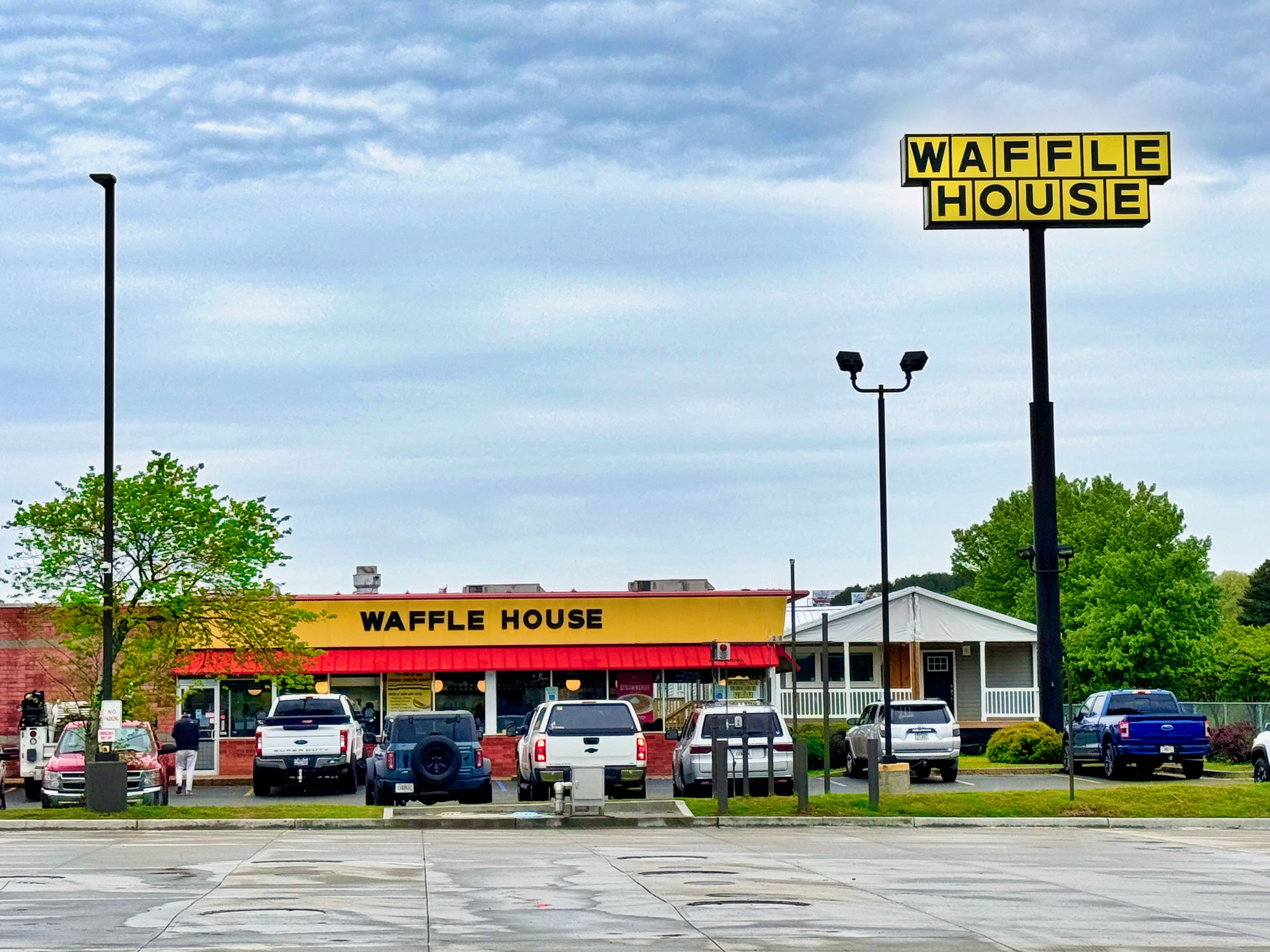
A Waffle House in Jasper, Georgia

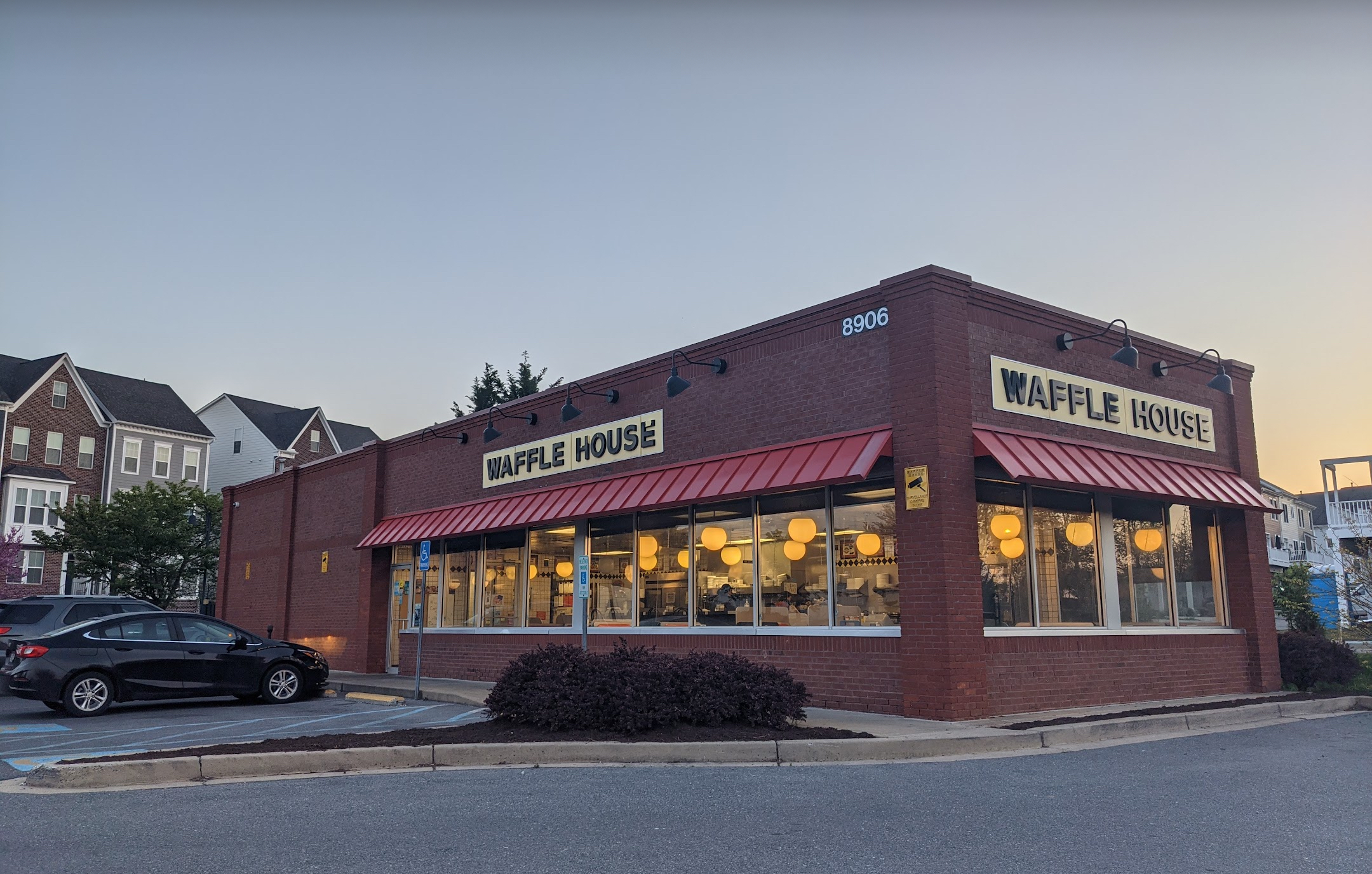
The Waffle House in Urbana, Maryland

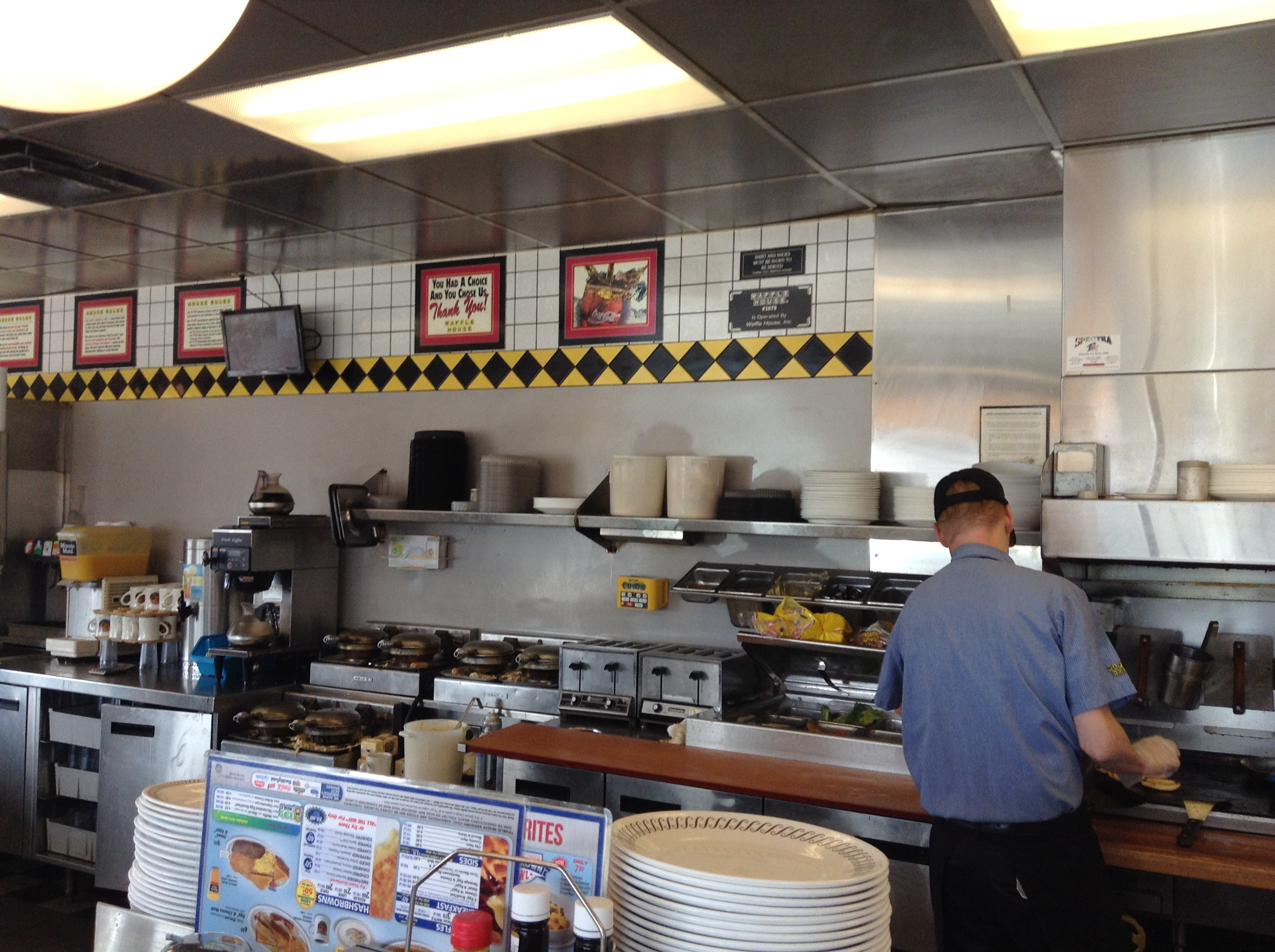
Waffle House in Oklahoma

A Waffle House near Clarksville, Tennessee

== Operations ==
Each Waffle House location is open 24 hours daily. This schedule has inspired the urban myth that "Waffle House doors have no locks". The chain's restaurants almost always have jukeboxes, which traditionally play 45-rpm singles and, in some cases, CDs. Waffle House has released music through its own record label, Waffle Records. It has released songs from "Saturday Night At My Place" by Gary Garcia released in 1995 to "They're Cooking Up My Order" by Alfreda Gerald released in 2006. The co-founder Joe Rogers Sr. had high standards and said, "If it sounded like a commercial, it got the ax." If the song makes the cut, it will be recorded and make its way to Waffle House jukeboxes. The songs are on ordinary discs, which are produced for Waffle House and are not commercially sold, but the chain has made a CD of some of the songs available for sale. Other artists that recorded for Waffle Records include Eddie Middleton who recorded "Good Food Fast" and "Waffle Doo-Wop," which was composed and produced by Jerry Buckner.

The company claims to be the world's leading seller of several of its menu items—the namesake waffles, ham, pork chops, grits, and T-bone steaks. It also claims that it serves 2% of all eggs in the U.S.

In the 1960s, S. Truett Cathy, the owner of a local diner called the Dwarf House, contracted with Waffle House to sell his proprietary chicken sandwich, the Chick-fil-A chicken sandwich. However, the Chick-fil-A sandwich quickly overtook Waffle House's own items in sales and Waffle House ended the deal, prompting Cathy to spin off Chick-fil-A into its own chain.

=== Waffle and steak ===
For years, Waffle House was known as "Waffle and Steak" in Indiana due to another chain of restaurants owning the rights to the Waffle House name in the state. The original Indiana Waffle House chain has started using the name "Sunshine Cafe". However, the d/b/a for "Sunshine Cafe" belongs to "Waffle House Greenwood Inc.", established in 1981. The oldest "Waffle House" entity listed with the Corporations office of the Indiana Secretary of State is "Waffle House of Bloomington, Indiana, Inc." established in 1967, and, like Waffle House Greenwood, it is still an active corporation. The Bloomington operation, the city's second oldest restaurant, closed in 2013, and was demolished to make way for an apartment complex. (Many of the Waffle House corporations in Indiana have been dissolved.) "Waffle House Inc." of Norcross, Georgia, registered with Indiana in 1974. In 2005, the Waffle and Steak restaurants all adopted the "Waffle House" moniker, bringing the entire chain under the name.

== Food safety ==
In 2004, in response to a serious Salmonella problem in 2003 at a Chili's location in Vernon Hills, Illinois, and by four deaths in 1993 from E. coli in undercooked hamburger at a Jack in the Box, the television news magazine Dateline NBC investigated sanitation practices of popular American family restaurant chains, measuring the number of critical violations per inspection. The Waffle House averaged 1.6 critical violations per inspection. Waffle House's response to the study pointed out that they prepare all meals in an open kitchen, and consumers can readily observe their sanitation practices themselves.

On September 17, 2019, customers who ate at a Waffle House in Goose Creek, South Carolina, were exposed to Hepatitis A. One of the employees who had worked there tested positive for Hepatitis A. After upper management found out, they immediately shut down the Goose Creek Waffle House location to sanitize the facility. DHEC officials said they would be working with Waffle House to investigate possible exposures and provide guidance for preventive treatment for anyone who may be affected.

== In popular culture ==
Waffle House has developed into a cultural icon. Part of Waffle House's fame is that they are prominent along Interstate highways in the South.

A now defunct GeoCities website, The Waffle House Shrine, hosted employee and customer comments about their experiences with Waffle House.

Waffle House has become known as an Internet meme for viral videos of fights on its premises, which have been attributed to the combination of being open 24/7 and its customers often being under the influence of alcohol, though this reputation has been described as a self-fulfilling prophecy with similar violence regularly taking place in other retail outlets.

== Disaster recovery ==
According to the Federal Emergency Management Agency (FEMA), Waffle House is one of the top four corporations, along with Walmart, The Home Depot, and Lowe's, for disaster response. Waffle House has an extensive disaster management plan with on-site and portable generators, and positions food and ice ahead of severe weather events such as a hurricane. This helps mitigate the effects of a storm on the power grid and the supply chains. The company prepares "jump teams" of recovery staff and supplies, brought in from outside disaster-affected areas, so that local staff can focus on helping their own homes and families. The ability of a Waffle House to remain open after a severe storm, possibly with a limited menu, is used by FEMA as a measure of disaster recovery known as the Waffle House Index.

== See also ==
- Denny's
- Golden Nugget Pancake House
- Huddle House
- IHOP
- The Original Pancake House
- Walker Brothers
