= Harold Butler (businessman) =

American businessman (1921–1998)

- Born: Harold Butler; July 6, 1921; Buffalo, New York
- Died: July 9, 1998 (aged 77); La Paz, Mexico
- Occupation(s): Entrepreneur and Philanthropist
- Known for: Founding Denny's

Harold Butler (July 6, 1921 – July 9, 1998) was an American entrepreneur. He is best known for being the founder of the Denny's casual dining restaurant chain. Butler also helped develop numerous other chains, including Winchell's Donuts, Naugles, and Jojo's.

In 1953, Butler and his partner Richard Jezak opened Danny's Donuts in Lakewood, California. In 1955, after his partner's departure from the then 6-store chain, Butler changed the concept in 1956 from a donut shop to a coffee shop with store #8. Danny's Donuts was renamed Danny's Coffee Shops and changed its operation to 24 hours. In 1959, to avoid confusion with Los Angeles restaurant chain Coffee Dan's, Butler changed the name from Danny's Coffee Shops to Denny's Coffee Shops. In 1961 Denny's Coffee Shops became Denny's.

In 1963, Butler began franchising Denny's. Under his leadership, the chain expanded to 800 locations. He once explained, "I love to feed people."

Butler tried to buy Caesars Palace in Paradise, Nevada. The Securities and Exchange Commission accused him of offering some Caesar's shareholders a secret (and illegal) deal. When the deal collapsed, Denny's stock price steeply declined. He sold his Denny's stock, once worth $80 million, for $3 million in 1971 and resigned as chairman.

Butler died of a heart attack on July 9, 1998, three days after his 77th birthday, in La Paz, Mexico, where he had retired. He was survived by his wife Jean (once a Denny's waitress and franchisee).
