= Del Taco =

American fast food restaurant chain

Del Taco Restaurants, Inc.
- Logo of Del Taco used since September 2022
- Type: Subsidiary
- Industry: Restaurants franchising
- Genre: Fast food
- Founded: September 16, 1964; 62 years ago, in Yermo, California
- Founders: Ed Hackbarth; David Jameson
- Headquarters: 25521 Commercentre Drive, Lake Forest, California, US
- Number of locations: 576 as of April 19, 2025
- Area served: Western United States; Southern United States; Metropolitan Detroit; Columbus metropolitan area, Ohio
- Key people: Anil Yadav, CEO; Ulyses Camacho, Chief Transformation Officer
- Products: Tacos; Mission burritos; Mexican style cuisine; Salads; Hamburgers; French fries; Milkshakes
- Revenue: ▲US$919 million (2025)
- Number of employees: 8,000 (2019)
- Parent: Yadav Enterprises (2025–present)
- Website: deltaco.com

Del Taco Restaurants, Inc. is an American fast food restaurant chain focused on a variety of tacos, burritos, french fries, and burgers. Del Taco is a subsidiary of Yadav Enterprises and is led by Chief Transformation Officer Ulyses Camacho. It is headquartered in Lake Forest, California, and has approximately 595 locations in 18 US states.

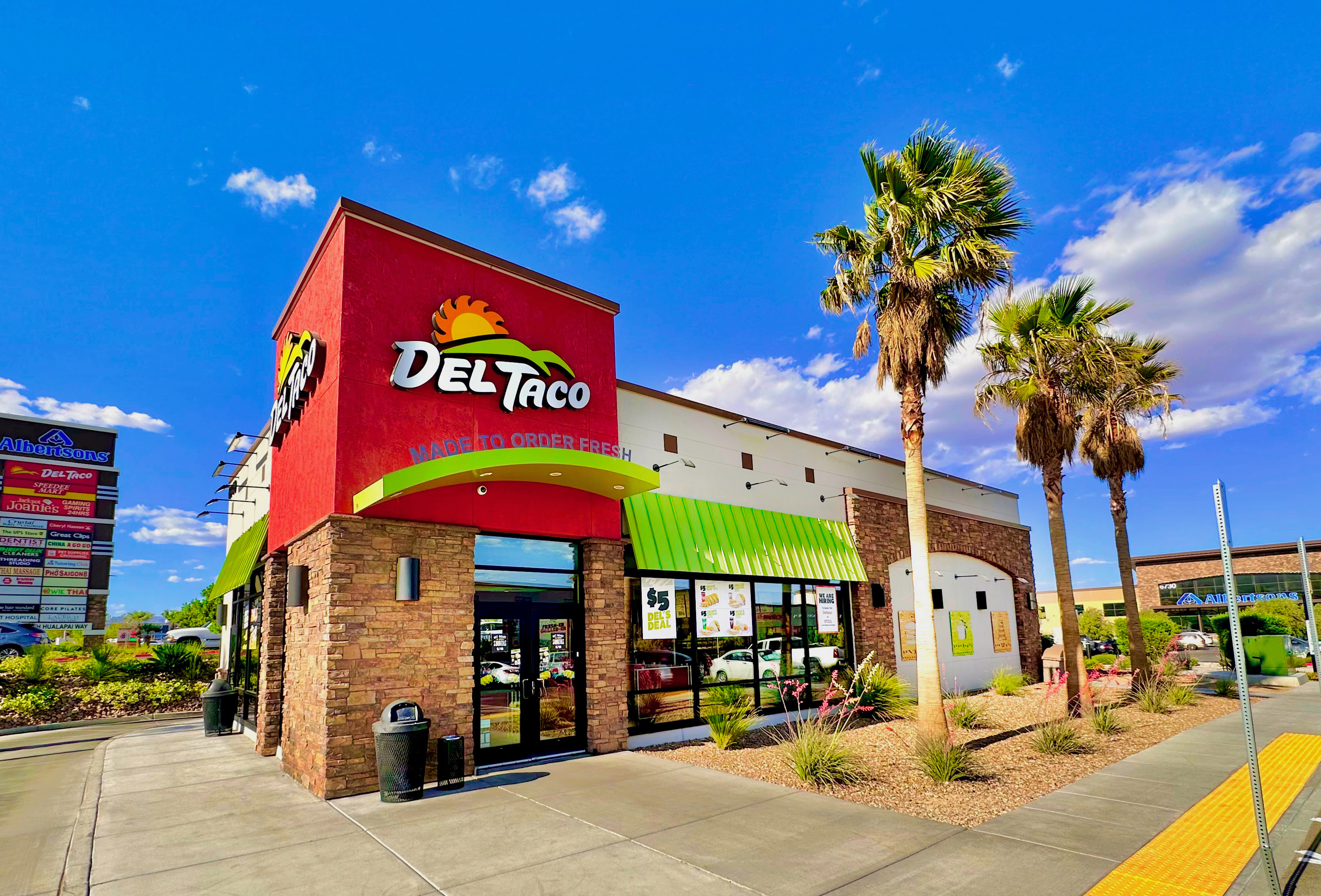
A Del Taco restaurant in Las Vegas, Nevada

== History ==
=== 1960s ===
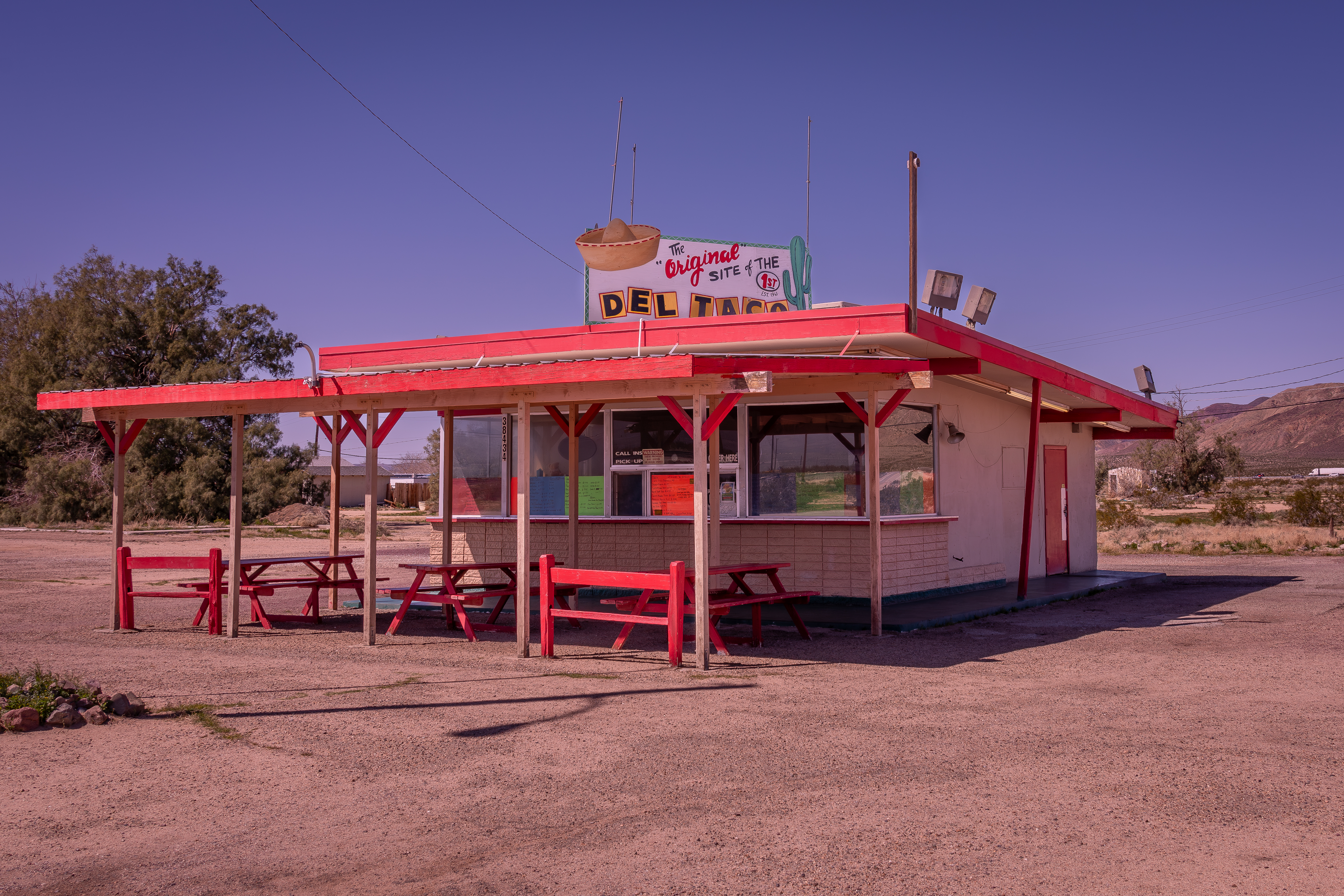
The first Del Taco restaurant in Yermo, California

The first Del Taco restaurant was opened by Ed Hackbarth and David Jameson in Yermo, California, east of Barstow, on September 16, 1964, under the name "Casa Del Taco". On the first day of business, Del Taco made $169 (the equivalent of $1,754 in 2025). Success of the first restaurant led to two in Barstow, one in Needles, and a fifth restaurant in Corona (the first Del Taco with a drive-through window). Dick Naugle, who installed the kitchen equipment in the Corona store, was impressed by the design and joined Hackbarth and Jameson in the fledgling business. In 1966, the trio founded Red-E-Food Systems, Inc., with the idea of franchising the Del Taco brand. That same year, the original Del Taco sun logo was created. In 1967, Del Taco introduced their bean and cheese burrito with green or red sauce.

=== 1970s ===
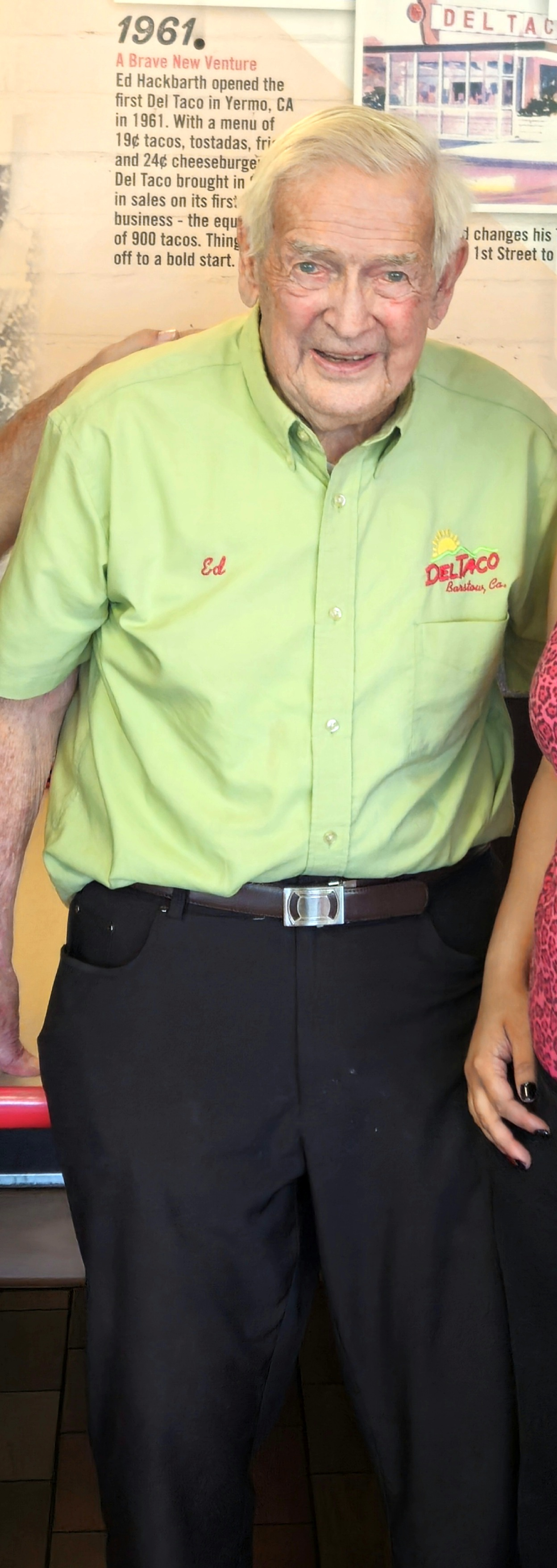
Ed Hackbarth, co-founder of Del Taco

Naugle left the company early in the decade to start Naugles. In 1973, the company dropped "Casa" from its name and Red-E-Food Systems became Del Taco, Inc. By that time, the company opened a new restaurant every month. In 1976, Hackbarth and Jameson sold Del Taco to a group of investors. The new owners sold the exclusive rights to use and develop the Del Taco name throughout the US (excluding California; Eugene, Oregon; and Yuma, Arizona) to W. R. Grace and Company. Grace, primarily a chemicals company, founded a new company, Del Taco Restaurants Inc. of Dallas, Texas, and a new subsidiary, DTG Inc., to oversee the fast food chains it was acquiring.

=== 1980s ===
In February 1989, Del Taco merged their restaurants with the 171 Naugles' Mexican fast food outlets. Anwar Soliman was instrumental in the move. He was the mastermind behind the purchase of the rights to expand Del Taco throughout the US in 1977. With the merger, Del Taco increased in size, and spread as far east as Hickory, North Carolina. In the 1980s, Del Taco began to stay open all night. In Lake Forest, California, there were two Del Tacos directly across the street from each other on Trabuco Road and El Toro Road. The one at the 22401 El Toro Road address was formerly a Naugles. In Orange, two Del Tacos were across the street from each other on Tustin Street. The one with the Lincoln Avenue address was formerly a Naugles.

=== 1990s ===
Kevin K. Moriarty joined Del Taco as CEO in 1990 and soon became owner of the brand in conjunction with his management team. His team launched efforts to expand the Del Taco image while improving the total customer experience.

In 1992, Del Taco recaptured exclusive rights to its name from W. R. Grace and Company, and was able to expand outside of California. Del Taco launched a $14 million program to redesign its restaurant exteriors, kitchens and corporate logo. The company presented its Concept 2000 restaurant design, and in August 1992 introduced its new logo. In place of the orange and blue sunset, there was a yellow sun that rose over green mountains against a red background. These colors represented the primary ingredients of Del Taco food: cheese, lettuce, and tomatoes. Later that year, executives announced plans to expand the chain to 500 stores by 1995, and to add another 225 by 2000. The first new markets it sought were Las Vegas, Nevada; St. Louis, Missouri; and the Northeast Corridor.

In 1993, Del Taco filed for protection under mChapter 11 in U.S. Bankruptcy Court. Although renovations were made to keep Del Taco profitable, the company continued to pay rent on several unprofitable outlets that had been closed. They also attempted to negotiate lease reductions on other high-cost sites. Also, Del Taco had been sued for $3 million by a former supplier. This was settled out of court.

From 1994 through 1998, Del Taco shrank and then grew; although the company signed a deal to open 15 franchise stores in the Northeast with many more in the Southeast, the chain was not near the goals publicized earlier. By 1995, Del Taco had 300 stores instead of the projected 500. The chain began to prosper in 1997 when total sales reached an estimated $250 million. By December 1998, Del Taco had 325 stores in 12 states.

=== 2000s ===
By 2000, Del Taco had 372 stores located in ten US states. That year a deal was signed with the Compass Group PLC that enabled Del Taco stores to open on US military bases. The first to do business was at Patuxent River Naval Air Station in St. Mary's County, Maryland, in early 2001. Other Del Tacos were planned for US bases in Puerto Rico and Naples, Italy.

In early 2001, a group of former Del Taco employees, all of whom were black, brought a discrimination suit against the chain. The group claimed that while working at Del Taco in the Los Angeles area, they had suffered verbal abuse, had been passed over for promotions in favor of Hispanic workers, and were being fired and replaced by illegal immigrants. The case had not been settled.

In an effort to improve its reputation, Del Taco launched a sports-sponsorship program with teams in eight US states, including the Mighty Ducks of Anaheim and Arizona Coyotes hockey teams, basketball's Los Angeles Clippers and Utah Jazz, the University of Nevada, Las Vegas's football and basketball teams, and several minor league hockey and baseball teams. The deal placed the Del Taco logo on signs, drink cups and special promotional items at the stadia of partner teams. It paid off as, in 2003, Del Taco announced that their restaurants had topped $1 million per store in average annual sales, which was remarkable considering that other US stores, notably McDonald's and Carl's Jr., featured a decrease in annual sales.

In 2006, private Nashville, Tennessee-based Sagittarius Brands, LLC (the parent company of Captain D's Seafood), purchased Del Taco.

In January 2008, Del Taco announced the opening of its 500th restaurant in Burbank, California. On April 27, 2009, a new Del Taco opened in Oviedo, Florida, marking the first time since the 1980s that Del Taco was available in the Orlando area. This location has since closed. There are two other Orlando locations still open.

=== 2010s ===
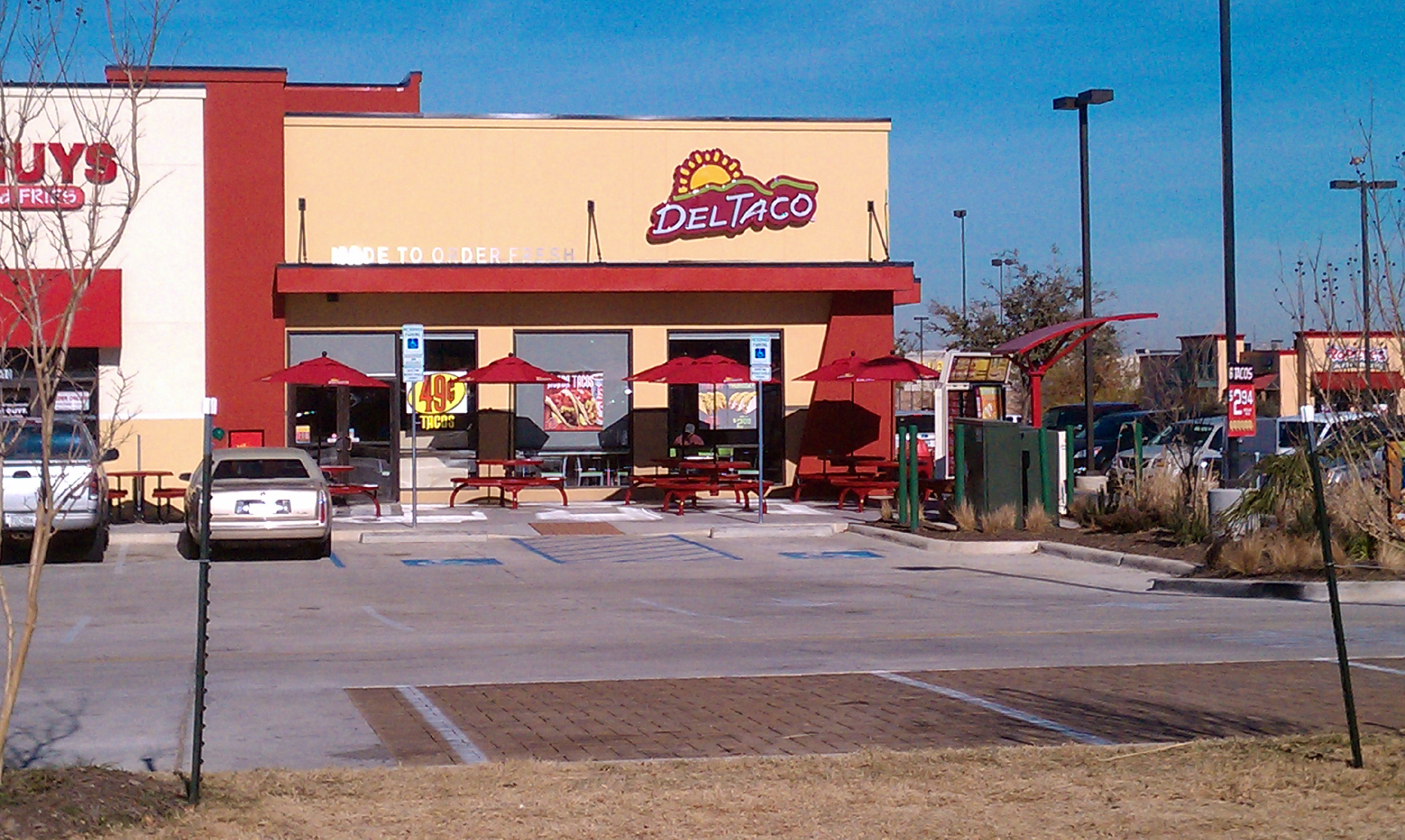
The Del Taco in Denton, Texas, which opened in 2010 and closed five years later

Del Taco returned to Texas in November 2010 with a new location in Denton, Texas. W. R. Grace and Company had previously owned and operated locations in Texas with a licensing agreement in 1978, but sold the restaurants to Taco Bell in 1992. Guillermo Perales, one of the largest Hispanic restaurateurs in the nation, signed a franchisee agreement in 2011 to open additional locations in the Dallas-Fort Worth area of Texas.

In March 2012, a location opened in Houston with plans for further expansion in the Houston area (that location was defunct by May 2015), including both Harris County and Montgomery County.

In April 2013, Del Taco entered Alabama by opening its first restaurant in Dothan, Alabama. A second restaurant opened in Montgomery, Alabama, in October 2013 only to close in February 2016.

Del Taco was purchased by Levy Acquisition Corporation and became a public company on June 30, 2015.

=== 2020s ===
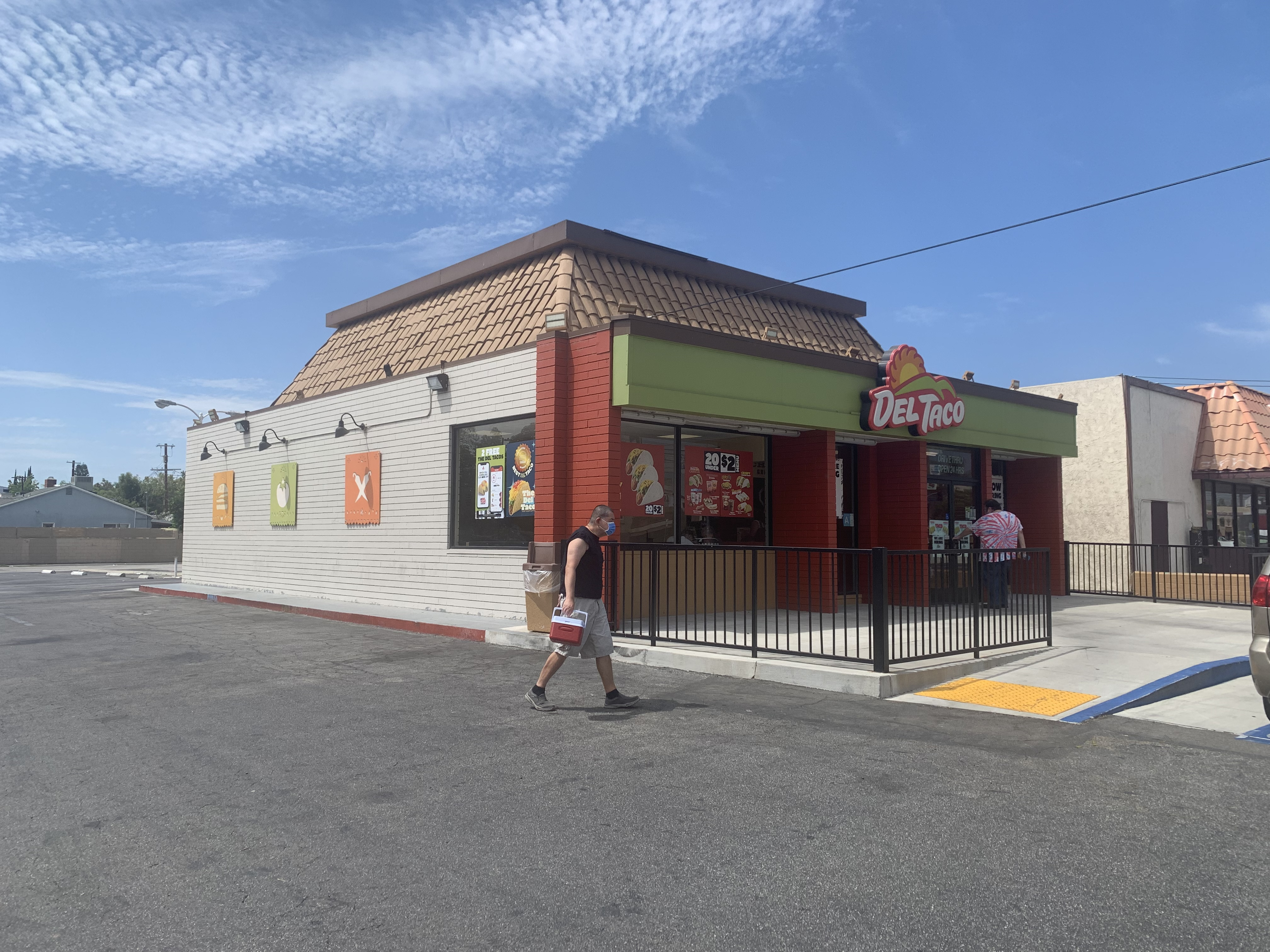
A Del Taco outlet in Reseda, Los Angeles, California, occupying a former Naugles location

In October 2020, Del Taco opened its first Ohio restaurant in Columbus, Ohio.

In September 2021, Del Taco announced it was expanding into Virginia. The first restaurant in Virginia was opened in July 2024 in Chesapeake.

In the same month, Del Taco released their new rewards program app, called "Del Yeah! Rewards".

On December 6, 2021, Jack in the Box announced it was acquiring Del Taco, saying the merger will cause both companies to benefit "from a stronger financial model, gaining greater scale to invest in digital and technology capabilities, and unit growth for both brands". The combined company will have more than 2,800 locations across 25 states. The acquisition closed in March 2022 for about $585 million. Jack in the Box previously owned Mexican fast casual purveyor Qdoba, which it divested in 2018.

On February 27, 2025, 18 of the 19 Colorado Del Taco locations closed abruptly. With notice posted at each location, "We regret to inform you that effective [Thursday], all Colorado Del Taco locations are closed until further notice," the sign posted on the door said. "We thank you for your patronage, the memories we have created together, and wish you well." The 18 locations were owned by one franchisee, while the remaining Grand Junction, Colorado location is owned by a separate entity. On June 20, 2025, Del Taco corporate sent out a promotional email to mailing list subscribers in Colorado titled "Guess who’s coming back? And we’re bringing the tacos.", teasing a reopening without announcing a date.

On October 16, 2025, Jack in the Box sold Del Taco to Yadav Enterprises for $115 million. The sale was finalized on December 22, 2025.

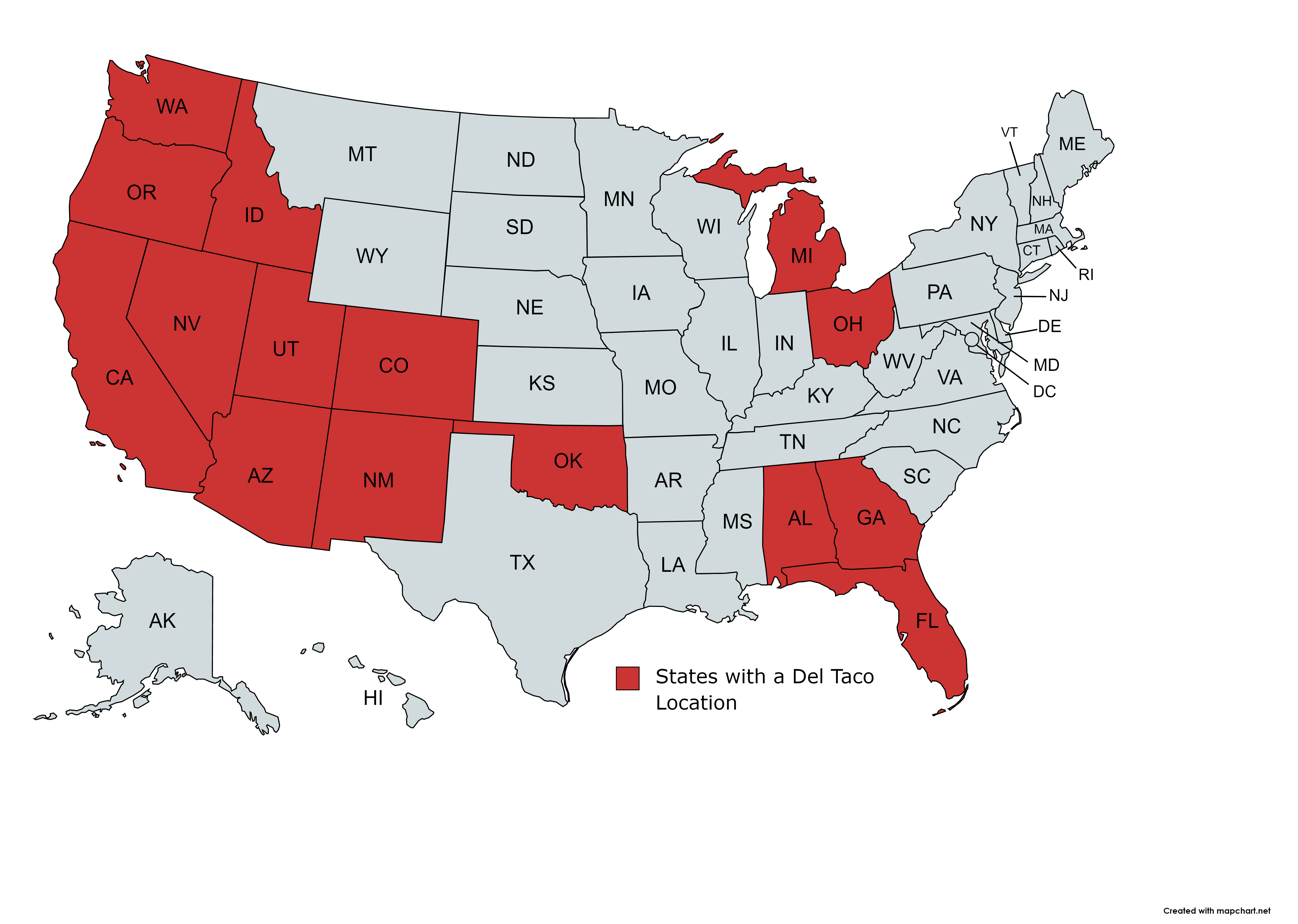
States with at least 1 Del Taco location as of January 2023

== Availability ==
The chain operates in 17 US states, 1 US Territory (Guam), and had 594 locations as of May 1, 2023. The majority of their restaurants are in California. Del Taco also operates in several other states, including Alabama, Arizona, Colorado, Florida, Georgia, Idaho, Michigan, Nevada, New Mexico, Ohio, Oklahoma, Oregon, Utah, Virginia and Washington. The company has a handful of locations east of the Mississippi.

Las Vegas, Nevada, has the most Del Tacos of any single city, and California has the most Del Tacos of any state.

== Products ==
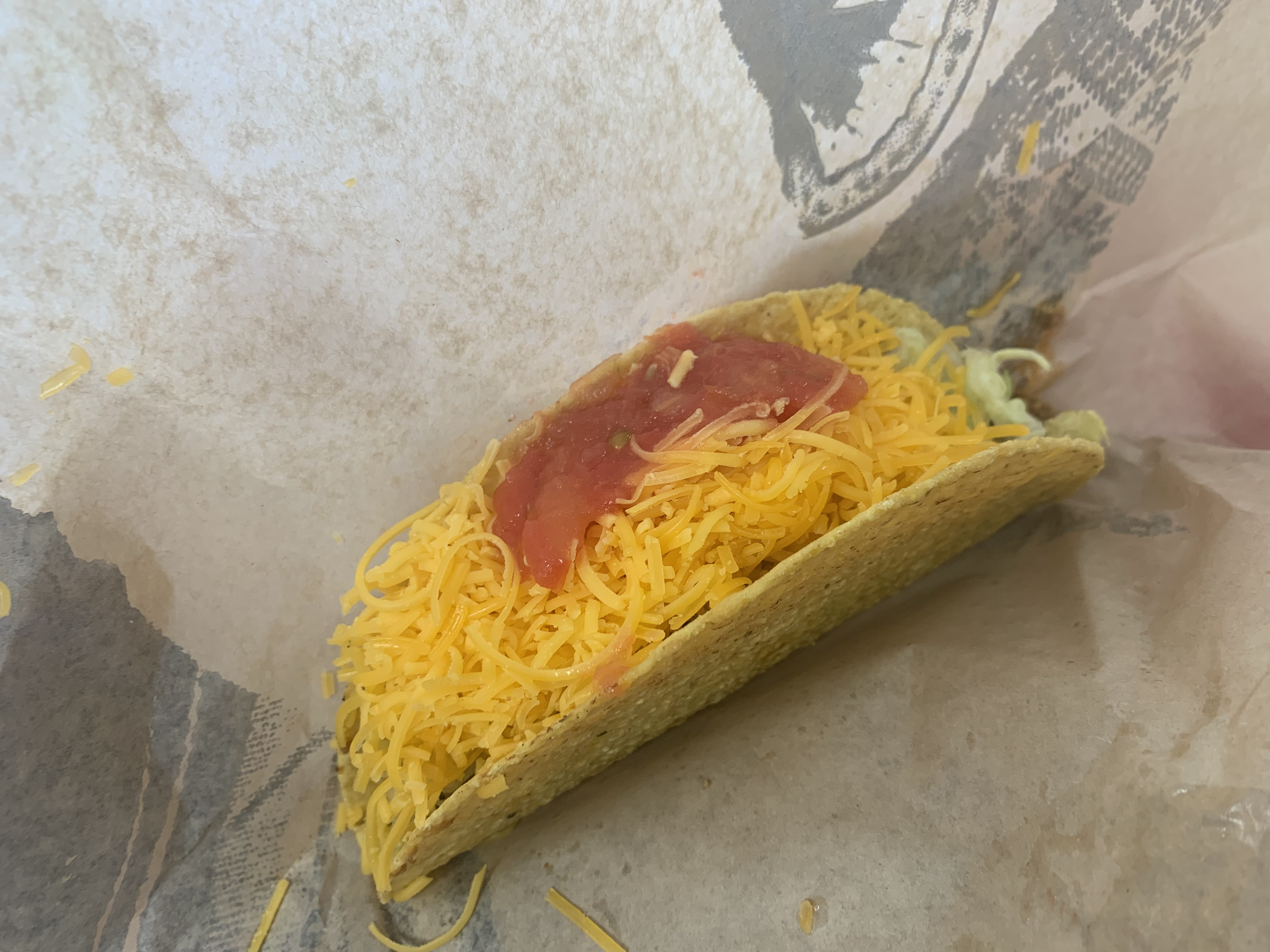
The signature taco of the chain.

Del Taco's standard menu includes:

- Hard Shell Tacos
- Soft Tacos
- Burritos
- Quesadillas
- Nachos
- Deluxe Taco Salad
- Crinkle Cut French Fries
- Chili Cheddar Fries
- Double Del Cheeseburger
- Bacon Del Cheeseburger
- Triple Del Cheeseburger
- Fries
- Shakes
- Fresh House-Made Guacamole
- Dinner Burritos (at least four types)

On April 25, 2019, Del Taco introduced plant-based Beyond Tacos nationwide in partnership with Beyond Meat. Since this introduction, Del Taco has created multiple other vegetarian and vegan menu items using Beyond Meat's plant-based crumbles including the Beyond Avocado Taco, the Epic Beyond Cali Burrito, and the Beyond 8 Layer Burrito. The Beyond food items were removed in 2023.

On January 29, 2020, Del Taco launched a new Value menu, with items costing a dollar or less before tax.

== Marketing ==
The first mascot of Del Taco was a character of the same name used from 1999 through 2000. Del Taco was sued by Zorro Productions, Inc., and Tristar Pictures, Inc., who claimed that the "Del Taco" character – masked and costumed in black – infringed on their rights to the trademark Zorro figure. Del Taco settled the suit in January 2000, agreeing to make changes to the Del Taco character, and soon discontinued the ad campaign.

From 2000 through early 2006, Del Taco used Gregg Binkley to play "Dan" in commercials. A clumsy spokesman, Dan was known for antics during commercials. Dan destroyed cars, broke hockey-rink glass, and held a sales event at a nude beach, while promoting a specific item for Del Taco.

From August 2007 through July 2008, Del Taco featured "The Beast" in their commercials. "The Beast", a personification of hunger, typically stood next to a customer and persuaded him to order a particular item (or items) so that they could "Feed the Beast" (Del Taco's slogan). "The Beast" made his debut in August 2007 promoting Del Taco's improved Chicken Soft Taco. He also endorsed the Crispy Fish Taco in February 2008, the improved Chicken Quesadilla in April 2008, and Del's Deal in June 2008.

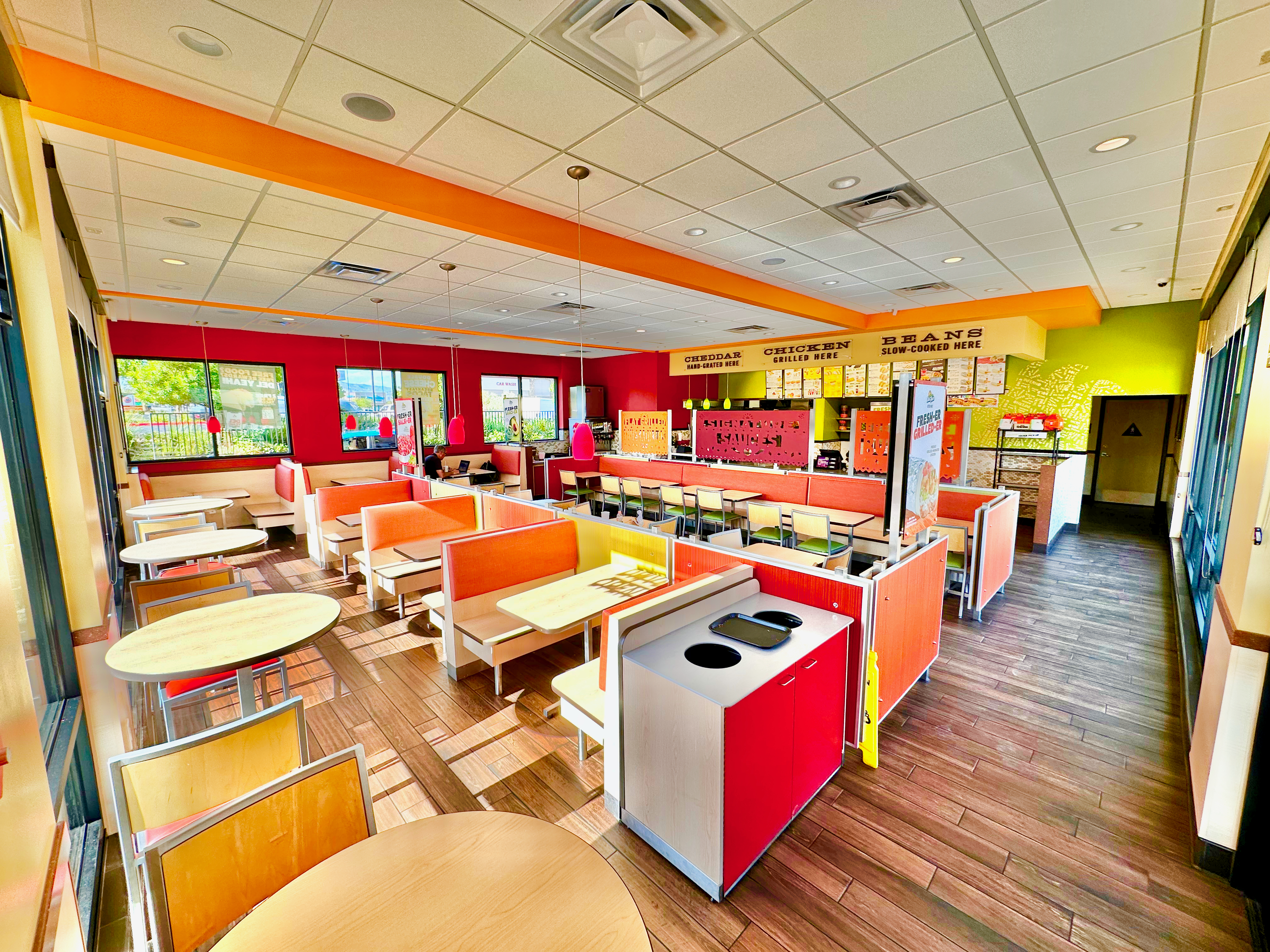
Inside a Del Taco restaurant

Del Taco has used a variety of commercials to promote the slogan, "Go Bold or Go Home". The first commercial featured a team of miniature "Mole Men" to promote the Spicy Chicken Mole Soft Taco, which aired in August 2008. Ads included Del Taco's promotion of their improved regular taco in September 2008, the Classic Combo Deal in November 2008, three separate meal deals for under three dollars in January 2009, the crispy shrimp taco in February 2009, the chicken soft taco in April 2009, and the chicken fajita burrito in June 2009.

In 2017, Del Taco was accused of violating state wage and hour laws, with the case including people who worked for the company between 2012 and 2021. In June 2022, Del Taco agreed to settle a class-action lawsuit in California for $50 million.

On June 27, 2018, Del Taco launched a campaign celebrating employees' successes while working at their restaurants using the new slogan, "Celebrating the hardest working hands in fast food," although the slogan, "That's unfreshing believable", is still used to promote their fresh food.

In 2018, the US Equal Employment Opportunity Commission (EEOC) filed a lawsuit against Del Taco, stating that the shift leader and general manager of stores near Rancho Cucamonga, California, harassed female employees through vulgar comments, physical conduct, and propositions of sex. The EEOC stated that the harassment occurred almost daily, and those who spoke up were retaliated against by having their work hours shortened or schedules changed. In December 2020, Del Taco settled the lawsuit by agreeing to pay $12.5 million and enter a three-year consent decree. The decree required Del Taco to train employees on anti-discrimination laws with an emphasis on sexual harassment, retain an employment monitor, and make it easier for employees to report harassment and discrimination.

== Popular culture ==
- On the Netflix show Grace and Frankie, Frankie, played by Lily Tomlin, regularly mentions her love of Del Taco throughout the series. Scenes include her revealing that she and her husband once bought a franchise and Frankie taking Grace for her first Del Taco visit.
- A popular video posted in early 2016 to Vine by user Gasoleen TV featured a woman reading a Del Taco sign that had incorrect spacing. The sign said: "FR E SH A VOCA DO" Del Taco has gone on to use this phrase on a Twitter marketing campaign.
