= Naugles =

American Mexican-style restaurant chain

- Type: Private
- Industry: Fast food
- Founded: 1970; 56 years ago in Riverside, California
- Founder: Dick Naugle
- Defunct: 1995; 31 years ago (last locations in Nevada)
- Fate: Merged with Del Taco
- Successor: Del Taco
- Headquarters: Riverside, California
- Number of locations: 200+
- Area served: Southern California; Nevada; Utah; St. Louis, Missouri; Orlando, Florida; Chicago, Illinois (list not complete), U.S
- Products: Mexican American fast food

Naugles was a Southern California fast-food Mexican restaurant chain that existed from 1970 to 1995. A revived Naugles chain was established in 2015 by entrepreneur Christian Ziebarth, after it was ruled that the trademarks had been abandoned by the original company's successor, Del Taco.

== History ==
Naugles was founded by former Del Taco partner Dick Naugle. The first Naugles restaurant was located at the southwest corner of 14th Street and Brockton Avenue, in Riverside, California (now a Del Taco) in 1970. Naugle's motto was "Prepare food fresh. Serve customer fast. Keep place clean!"

Harold Butler purchased Naugles in 1979 when the chain consisted of three restaurants. The chain was expanded by a system of non-exclusive franchises, which later was ruled unlawful by a federal court. Butler built Naugles up to 275 restaurants by 1984, when he sold the chain to Collins Foods International. Naugles merged with Del Taco in 1988 when businessman Anwar Soliman purchased both companies at nearly the same time. A few of the Naugles menu items, such as those with the "Macho" designation, found their way into the regular Del Taco menu.

Later in May 1989, Soliman announced that he was going to convert most of the 171 Naugles locations to Del Taco by the end of that summer. By the time Soliman sold the integrated company in January 1990 to a four-member group of Del Taco managers led by President Wayne W. Armstrong, there were 59 Naugles left with 25 located in California and 34 located in Utah, Nevada, Missouri and Arizona with 290 Del Tacos in California plus a lone Del Taco in Arizona. In August 1992, only 31 Naugles in the states of Utah, Nevada, Missouri, and Illinois remained with all the locations in California had been converted.

In March 1994, Del Taco converted seven of 8 remaining Naugles locations in Nevada to the Del Taco brand. The last Naugles to close in Nevada was in 1995, in Carson City, Nevada. A Naugles located on Highway 50 in Carson City location was not converted to a Del Taco, but in late 1995 became a Carson City Restaurant called China East. Del Taco stated that the Nevada conversions led to a great increase in sales at those locations. Seven months later, Del Taco announced it had completed converting all six remaining Naugles locations in the state of Utah in October 1994. In December 1994, Del Taco announced that they have finished converting all four Naugles in the metropolitan St. Louis area. According to the 1994 article in the St. Louis Post-Dispatch, the four Naugles locations in St. Louis were the last sites that were converted to Del Taco.

The last four remaining Naugles locations, all in Nevada, closed in 1994–1995. In the Las Vegas area, 3 restaurants closed circa 1994/95. The last Naugles location, in Carson City Nevada, on Highway 50 East, closed in 1995.

== Revival ==
Naugles
- Logo of revival company
- Type: private
- Industry: Fast food
- Founded: 2015; 11 years ago in Fountain Valley, California
- Founders: Christian Ziebarth, Josh Maxwell, Dan Dvorak
- Number of locations: 2
- Area served: Fountain Valley; Stanton
- Products: Mexican American fast food
- Website: nauglestacos.com

In August 2006, blogger Christian Ziebarth posted a remembrance page on his year old Orange County Mexican Restaurants blog site on how he missed the defunct Naugles restaurant chain and wanted Del Taco to bring back some of the old but unique Naugles food items. In a short time, he received comments from hundreds of others who felt the same. So much interest was generated by his webpage that a Del Taco public relations staffer contacted Ziebarth to see how Del Taco could take advantage of this renewed interest.

On May 31, 2012, the Orange County Register reported that a group was attempting to revive the Naugles brand. On July 9, 2013, the OC Weekly ran a similar story, with the author of the piece mentioning he had tried some Naugles taco sauce.

On March 31, 2015, Christian Ziebarth (President), Josh Maxwell (CEO) and Dan Dvorak (CMO) won the judgment from the Trademark Trial and Appeal Board, allowing the group to use the name to start a new restaurant in Fountain Valley, California. In the years since first applying to take up the Naugles trademark and menu (back in 2010), Ziebarth and chef John Smittle went on to re-create the original menu and its flavors from scratch, and Ziebarth, Maxwell and Dvorak began hosting pop-ups at various locations to further gather ground support.

Ziebarth, Maxwell and Dvorak decided to open a "test" kitchen on Mt. Langley Street in Fountain Valley to help shape the brand and on July 25, 2015, the Fountain Valley location had a soft opening primarily for fans from an unofficial Facebook fan page. For the first few days, the restaurant was inundated by fans, ran out of food several times, and was forced to close early due to lack of supplies.

The revived Naugles opened its first daily operating location on the Pacific Coast Highway in Huntington Beach on May 28, 2016, taking over a former Wahoo's Fish Taco across from the Waterfront Hilton. The initial lease was for the summer of 2016. The lease was renewed and had served as a beach front seasonal location until it closed at the end of summer of 2021.

A second Huntington Beach location on Warner Avenue opened briefly during the summer of 2017 before disappearing a few weeks later.

A third location was opened on Beach Boulevard in Stanton in January 2020. This location had outdoor seating, a drive thru, and limited indoor seating.

Naugles briefly opened a location on Artesia Boulevard in Artesia in April 2023 only to close it seven months later.

During the summer of 2024, Naugles briefly had a pop-up that operated from May to September at the Bolsa Chica State Beach. The following year, the company decided to go into a different direction with the introduction of a food truck in March 2025.

A decade after the debut of the revived brand, a writer for Mashed pointed out that although the revival was very successful from both a legal and cultural standpoint, it is not necessarily the large cash generating enterprise as first envisioned by their founders based upon the short duration of multiple failed locations tried so far.

== In popular culture ==
In the original Naugles TV commercials, the character of Señor Naugles was played by two successive character actors, Roger C. Carmel and comedian Avery Schreiber.
