= Denny's =

Restaurant chain established in the United States

Denny's Corporation
- Logo since April 2, 2019

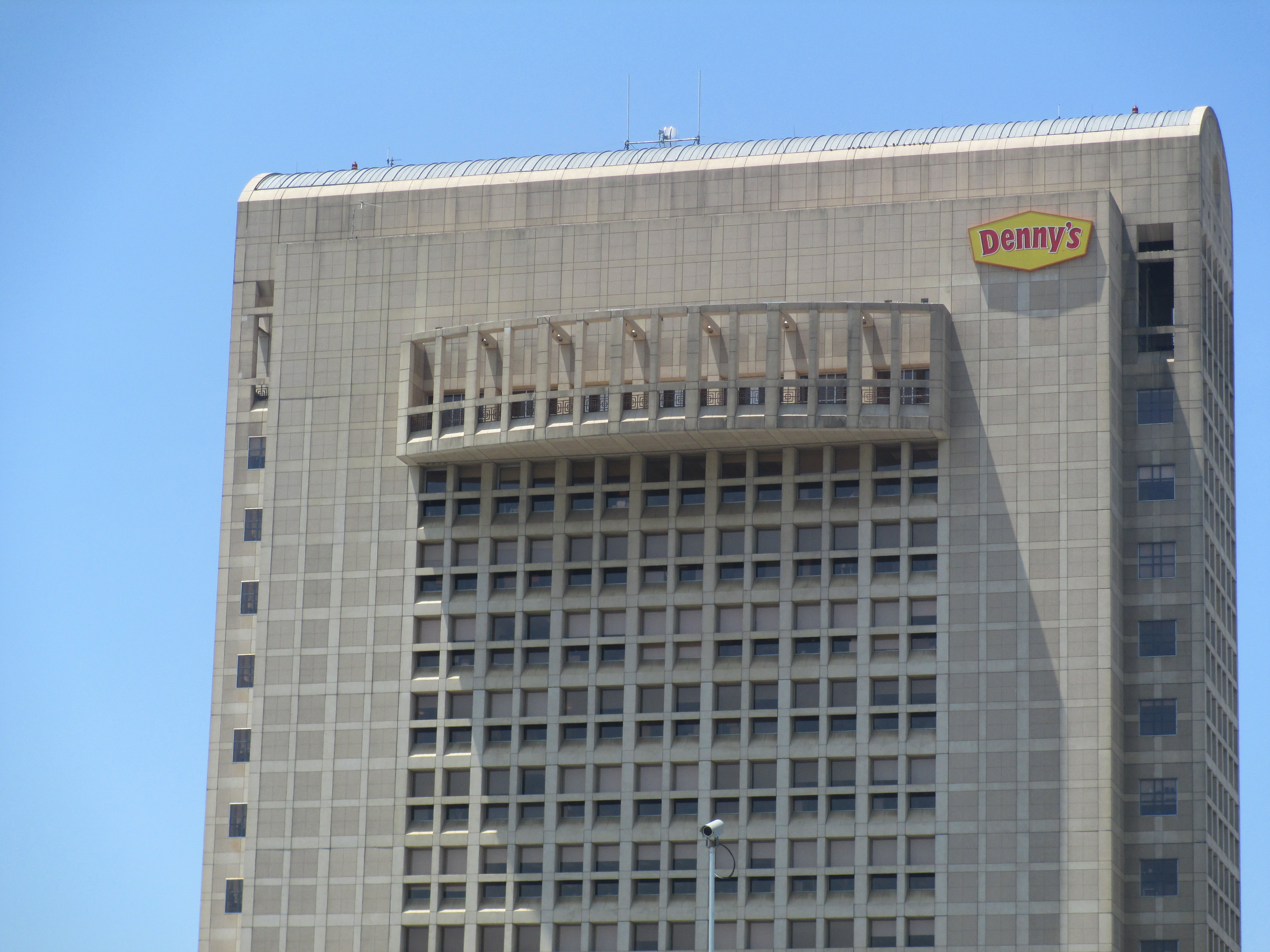
- Corporate headquarters in downtown Spartanburg, South Carolina, pictured in July 2012
- Trade name: Denny's
- Formerly: TW Services, Inc. (1986–1989); TW Holdings, Inc. (1989–1993); Flagstar Companies, Inc. (1993–1997); Advantica Restaurant Group, Inc. (1997–2002)
- Type: Private
- Traded as: Nasdaq: DENN (1998–2026)
- Industry: Restaurants Franchising
- Genre: Diner
- Predecessor: Trans World Corporation (restaurant division); Denny's, Inc.
- Founded: 1953; 73 years ago (brand); December 30, 1986; 39 years ago (company)
- Founders: Harold Butler; Richard Jezak
- Headquarters: Spartanburg, South Carolina, U.S.
- Number of locations: 1,499 (2024)
- Key people: Christopher Bode (President and CEO)
- Revenue: ▼US$452 million (2024)
- Operating income: ▼US$45.3 million (2024)
- Net income: ▲US$21.6 million (2024)
- Total assets: ▲US$496 million (2024)
- Total equity: ▲ −US$34 million (2024)
- Owners: TriArtisan Capital Advisors; Treville Capital Group; Yadav Enterprises
- Number of employees: 3,800 (2024)
- Website: dennys.com

Logo from 2002 to 2019. This logo is still in use at many locations.

Denny's (also known as Denny's Diner on some locations' signage) is an American table service diner-style restaurant chain. It operates over 1,400 restaurants in the United States, Canada, Mexico, Puerto Rico, and several other international locations.

Founded in 1953 with a donut stand in Lakewood, California, under the name Danny's Donuts, the chain has grown to one of the largest full-service family restaurant chains in the United States. In January 2026, it was acquired by TriArtisan Capital Advisors, Treville Capital Group, and Yadav Enterprises.

In 2025, Denny's closed 150 underperforming, unprofitable locations due to rising operating costs and declining customer traffic.

== Description ==
Denny's started franchising in 1963, and most Denny's restaurants are now franchisee-owned. Franchise agreements require 24/7 service in most locations. Because of the impact of the COVID-19 pandemic on the restaurant industry in the United States, many Denny's had to close for the first time and may now have limited hours of operation.

== History ==
Original "Denny's" located in Lakewood, California (1953)

The restaurant originally opened as Danny's Donuts in 1953, founded by Richard Jezak and Harold Butler and located at the southeast corner of Bellflower and Del Amo boulevards in Lakewood, California. After Jezak left the six-store chain in 1956, Butler shifted the business concept from a donut shop to a coffee shop with store No. 8.

During the 1950s, Los Angeles architects Armet & Davis created a new prototype building with a boomerang-shaped roof that became a model for stores built nationwide. They also designed a second prototype in 1965 with a zigzag shingled roof. These designs enabled Googie architecture to spread across America. Many Denny's locations were built near freeway off-ramps, leading to increasingly larger signage.

In 1959, Danny's Donuts was renamed Denny's Coffee Shops and changed its operation to 24 hours in order to avoid confusion with the Los Angeles restaurant chain Coffee Dan's. Two years later, it changed its name again to simply Denny's.

During a period when the business was expanding, reaching over 1,000 restaurants and all 50 states by 1981, the company absorbed many former Sambo's restaurants and used their mid-century design in some of their restaurants. In 1977, Denny's introduced the still-popular Grand Slam breakfast.

After maintaining them until 1989 in La Mirada, California, Denny's moved its main offices to Irvine, California, and then to Spartanburg, South Carolina, where Trans World Corporation (TWC), its parent company since 1987, maintained its headquarters. By acquiring a 47% stake in TWC in 1992, the private equity firm KKR encouraged it to sell its non-core businesses.

In 1994, Denny's became the largest corporate sponsor of Save the Children, a national charity. All but six Denny's locations closed for the first time ever for Christmas 1988; this was problematic because many restaurants had been built without locks, and others had reportedly lost their keys.

Also in 1994, it began renovating its stores with a lighter color scheme; select locations also began serving Baskin-Robbins ice cream for a short time. Houston, Texas, was the test market for the chain-wide renovation.

After changing its name from TWC to The Flagstar Companies, this firm filed for Chapter 11 bankruptcy on July 12, 1997. Denny's dominated its operations to such an extent that Flagstar changed its name again to Denny's Corporation, trading on the Nasdaq under the symbol DENN.

Along with their famous breakfasts and hamburgers, Denny’s introduced the Beyond Burger as a vegetarian alternative in 2020. It was discontinued in 2023 and replaced with Dr. Praeger's California Veggie Patty.

On November 3, 2025, it was announced that Denny's Corporation would be acquired by TriArtisan Capital Advisors, Treville Capital Group and Yadav Enterprises, expecting to complete the $620 million transaction and take it private in the first quarter of 2026. The transaction was completed in January 2026. Following the transaction, the company named Christopher Bode as its new president and CEO.

On December 2, 2025, People Magazine reported that the chain had announced it would close 150 underperforming locations across the U.S.

=== Denny's Diner prototype ===
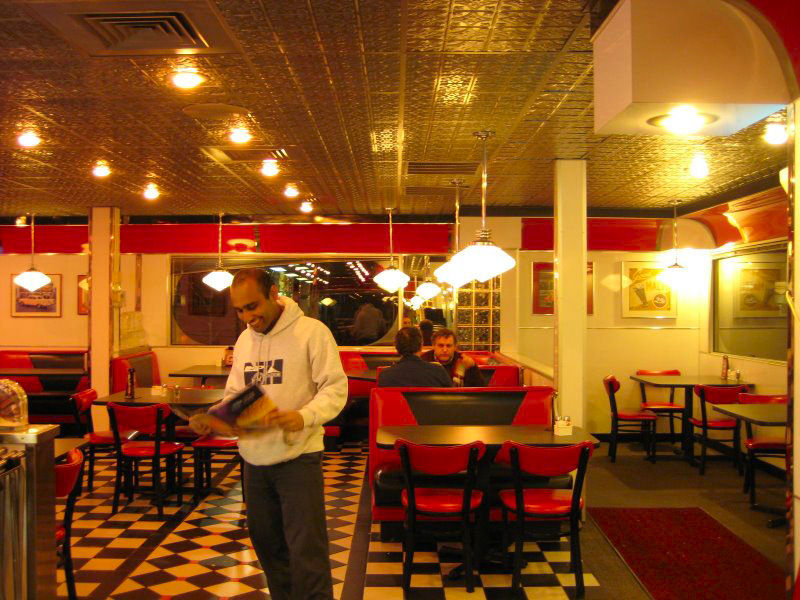
Denny's Diner in Bangor, Maine, inspired by 1950s culture (March 2008)

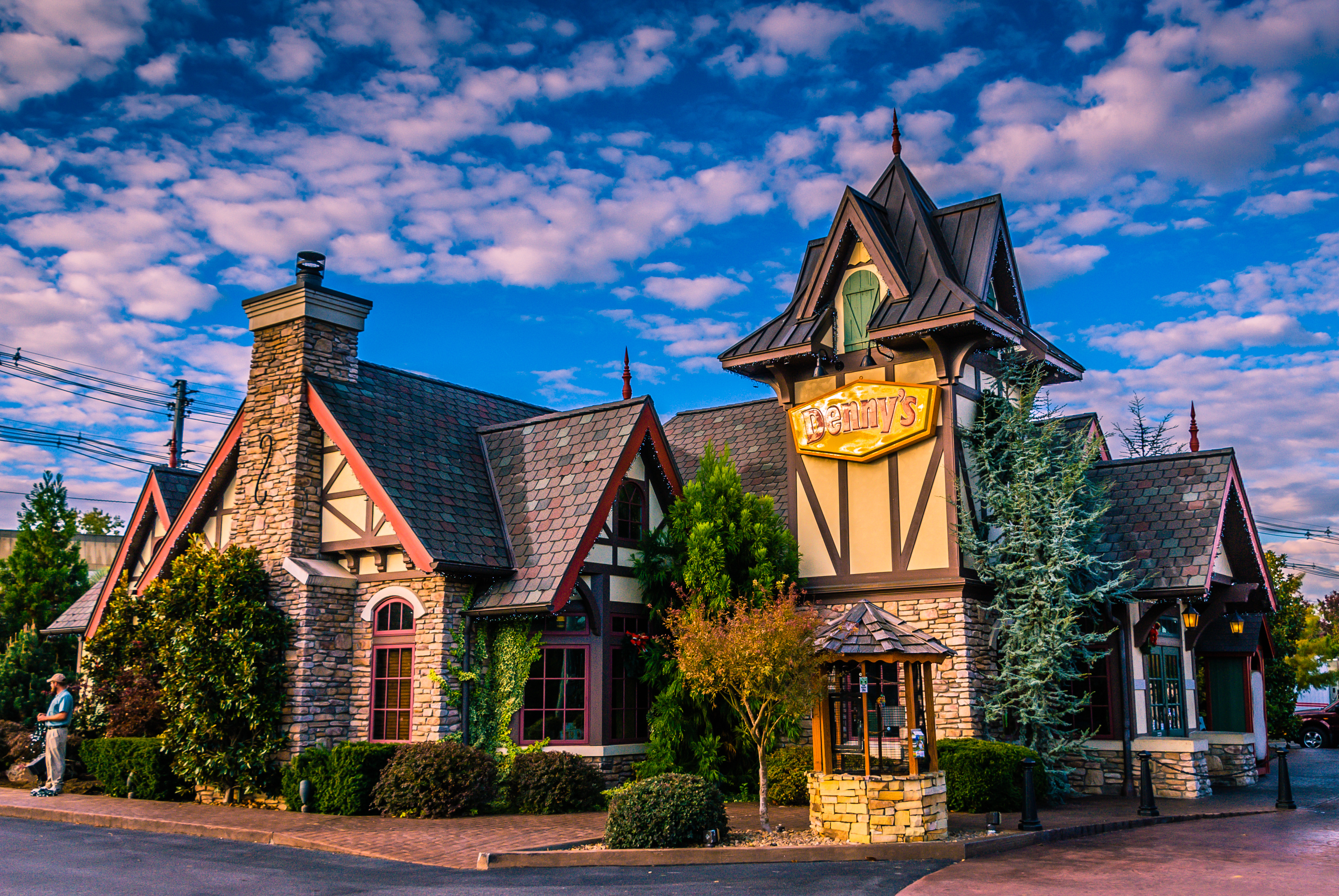
Exterior of a former Denny's in Pigeon Forge, Tennessee (November 2017)

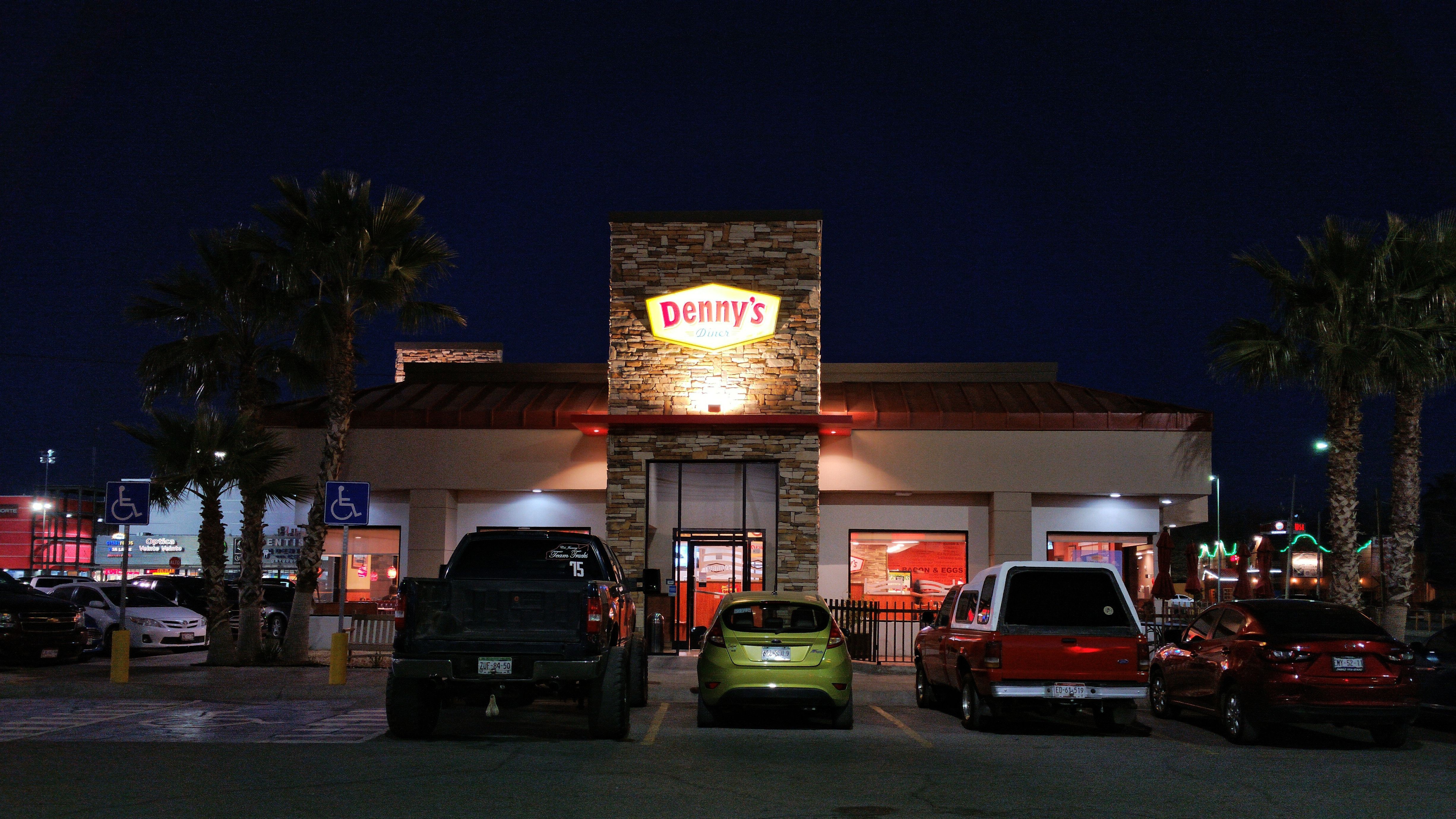
Exterior of Denny's at night (May 2019)

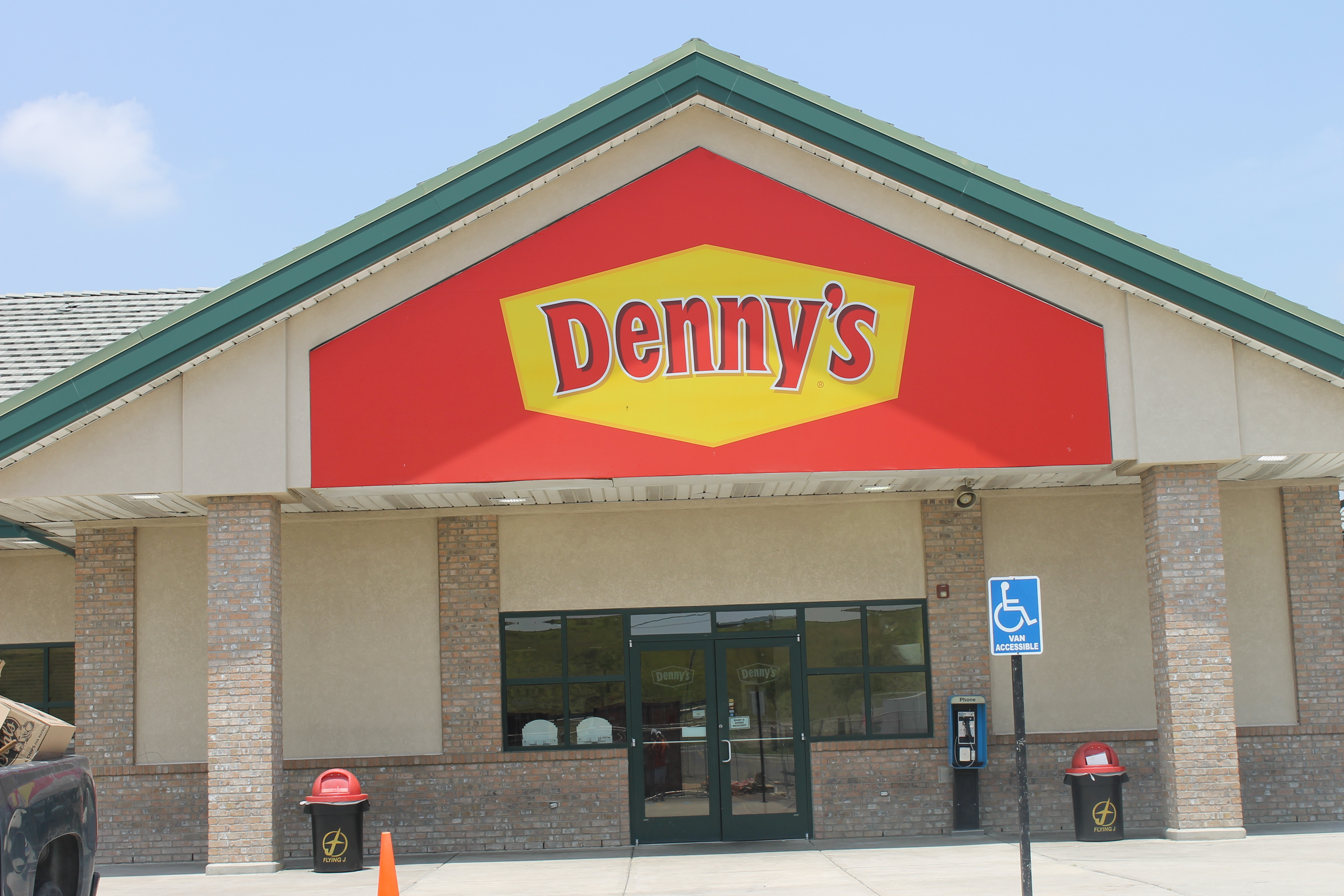
This Denny's off Interstate 35 north of Laredo, Texas, handles a considerable trucker clientele (July 2014).

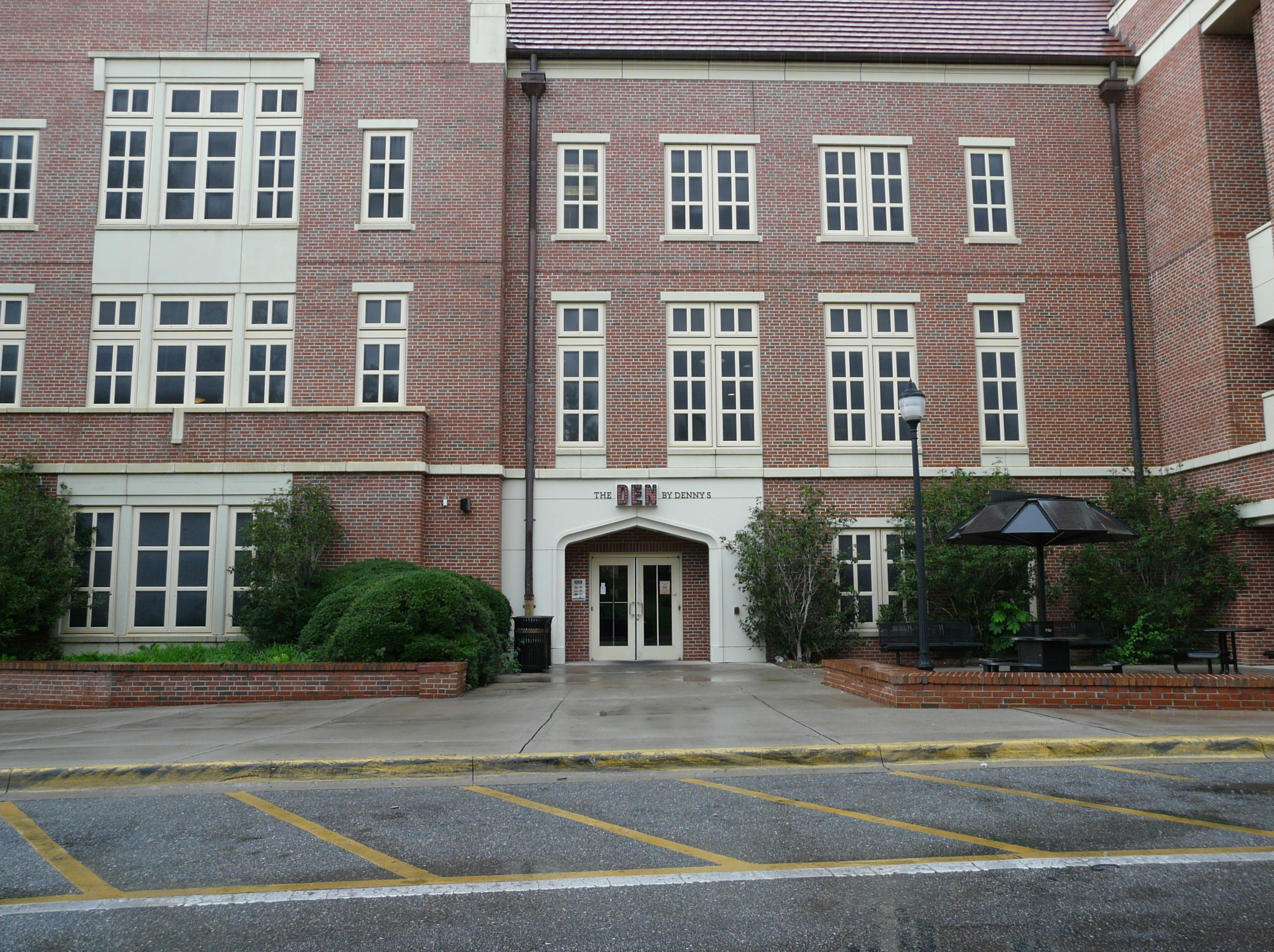
The Den by Denny's at Florida State University

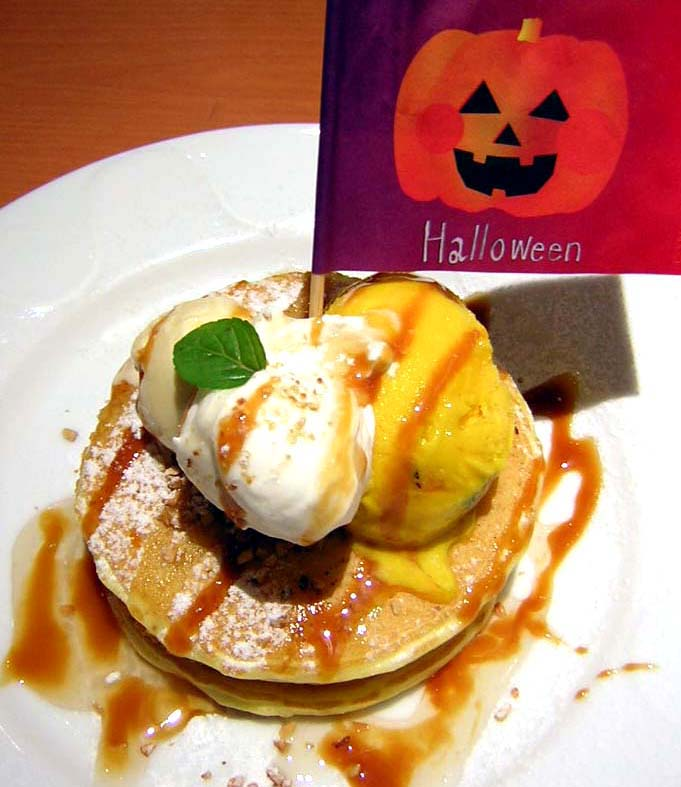
A Halloween pancake at a Denny's in Tokyo (October 2006)

Some Denny's restaurants employ the "diner" concept, using modular buildings resembling classic 1950s diners. In May 1997, the first Denny's Classic Diner was opened in Fort Myers, Florida. The diner concept was created by Ron, Marcia, Marc, and Todd York, the principals of Denny's franchisee SWFRI. Today, there are about 40 Denny's Diners in the United States. Additionally, several diners resemble modular buildings but are actually stick construction.

=== Domestic and international growth ===
It opened its first restaurant in Australia in December 1982, in the suburb of Forest Hill, Melbourne. The Australian franchise was owned by Ansett Australia and expanded into other states throughout the 1980s. However, changing tastes of the Australian consumer led to the sale of the chain in 1989 and its closure shortly after that.

In July 2010, Denny's presence in the United States saw a major expansion when Pilot Flying J started opening Denny's locations inside their Flying J-branded truck stop locations. 123 Pilot Flying J conversions were eventually completed.

In June 2012, Denny's opened a location in the Las Américas International Airport, its first location in an airport and its first in the Dominican Republic. In July 2012, Denny's announced it had signed an agreement with a franchisee to open 50 restaurants in southern China over 15 years, beginning in 2013. This was Denny's largest international development deal at that time. However, the deal was cancelled before any restaurants opened.

On August 29, 2014, Denny's opened its first location in New York City, with some patrons waiting as long as two hours before its official opening to eat there. Located in Lower Manhattan, the location is designed to be more upscale than the typical Denny's, serves alcohol, and offers a location-exclusive $300 Grand Cru Slam, which is the standard Grand Slam Breakfast served with a bottle of Dom Pérignon. It closed in January 2018.

In November 2017, it was announced that Denny's was to open its first restaurant in the United Kingdom in Swansea in December 2017 as part of Parc Tawe's 15 million redevelopment scheme, occupying a 4,000 sq ft unit. The restaurant opened on Christmas Day 2017 for the homeless people in the city of Swansea, although the official opening to the general public was on December 27.

In 2022, Denny's acquired Orlando-based chain Keke's Breakfast Cafe for $82.5 million. During an October 22, 2024, investor day, Denny's announced it would expand Keke's nationwide while closing 150 Denny’s restaurants in the following 12 to 18 months.

At the end of 2023 there were 1,602 Denny's restaurants, with the company owning and operating 66 with the remaining 1,582 under a franchising model; 1,445 of Denny's 1,602 restaurants are located in the United States (including the District of Columbia), 84 in Canada, 15 in Mexico, 15 in Puerto Rico, 12 in Philippines, 7 in New Zealand, 6 in Honduras, 5 in the United Arab Emirates, 2 in Guatemala, 3 in Costa Rica, 2 in Guam, 3 in El Salvador, 1 in Indonesia, 1 in Curaçao and 1 in the United Kingdom. Denny's previously had a location in Chile. The U.S. states with the most Denny's restaurants are California (363), Texas (204) and Florida (124).

There are also about 578 Denny's restaurants in Japan operated independently under a license by a subsidiary of Seven & I Holdings since 1984. The first Denny's restaurant in Japan opened on the first floor of the Ito-Yokado in Kamiōoka (ja:上大岡), Kōnan-ku, Yokohama, on April 27, 1974, however, it closed on March 20, 2017, on account of the demolition of the building of Ito-Yokado.

== Health inspection records ==
In October 2004, Dateline NBC aired a segment titled "Dirty Dining", in which the ten most popular family and casual dining chains in the United States were examined: Applebee's, Bob Evans, Chili's, Denny's, IHOP, Outback Steakhouse, Red Lobster, Ruby Tuesday, TGI Friday's, and Waffle House. As part of the segment, the producers examined the health inspection records for 100 restaurants over 15 months and totaled all of the critical violations that could result in adverse effects on the customers' health. Denny's had the fewest violations, averaging fewer than one violation per restaurant. Denny's attributes this relative success to its adherence to the principles of Hazard Analysis and Critical Control Points.

== Animal welfare efforts ==
By 2026, Denny's is seeking to switch to 100% cage-free eggs.

The Humane Society of the United States has tried to make Denny's treat animals, primarily pigs, better and remove them from gestation crates. However, the company removed its initial commitment and is now facing a public awareness campaign. In 2024, the Humane Society of the United States filed a shareholder proposal requesting that the company reinstate its deadline to eliminate gestation crates from its supply chain. Despite Denny's prior animal welfare commitments, this proposal was denied and no further time-bound targets have been set.

== Controversies ==
=== Discrimination ===
Denny's has been involved in discrimination lawsuits involving food servers denying or providing inferior service to racial minorities, especially black customers.

In San Jose, California, in 1991, several black teenagers were refused service unless they agreed to pay in advance.

A 1993 incident occurred when six black United States Secret Service agents visited a Denny's restaurant in Annapolis, Maryland. They were forced to wait an hour for service while their white companions were seated immediately.

In 1994, Denny's settled a class action lawsuit filed by black customers who had been refused service, forced to wait longer, or pay more than white customers. The $54.4 million settlement was the largest under federal public accommodations laws established thirty years earlier.

In 1995, a black Denny's customer in Sacramento, California, was told that he and his friends had to pay upfront at the counter upon ordering their meals. He questioned the waitress: "We asked the waitress about it and she said that some black guys who had been in the restaurant earlier had made a scene and walked out without paying their bill. So the manager now wanted all blacks to pay up front."

In 1997, six Asian-American students from Syracuse University visited a local Denny's restaurant late at night. They waited more than half an hour as white patrons were regularly served, seated, and offered more helpings. They complained to management and their server but were forced to leave the establishment by two security guards called by Denny's management. Then, according to the students, a group of white men came out of Denny's, attacked them and shouted racial epithets. Several of the students were beaten unconscious.

After the $54.4 million settlement, Denny's created a racial sensitivity training program for all employees. Denny's has also made efforts at improving its public relations image by featuring African-Americans in their commercials, including one featuring Sherman Hemsley and Isabel Sanford, actors from the popular The Jeffersons television series. In 2001, Denny's was chosen by Fortune magazine as the "Best Company for Minorities." In 2006 and 2007, Denny's topped Black Enterprise's list of "Best 40 Companies for Diversity."

In 2014, a Denny's location in Deming, New Mexico, was subjected to a discrimination claim by an LGBT group, alleging that wait staff used homophobic slurs and refused to serve a group of gay, lesbian, and transgender customers who were attending a gay pride celebration. One year later, Denny's agreed to donate $13,000 to Deming Pride, pay $3,250 to a female customer who was subjected to abusive behavior by wait staff, and retrain its employees about discrimination policies.

In 2017, the staff at a Denny's in Vancouver, British Columbia, was accused of making an Indigenous woman pay for her meal before it was served. After the customer left, restaurant staff called police to report the incident, alleging that the patron had a sharp metal object in her pocket.

=== Animal cruelty allegations ===
In 2023, the global animal rights group Animal Equality began a public information campaign regarding Denny's failure to eliminate gestation crates for pigs from its supply chain.

=== Sudden closures ===
In June 2017, eight Denny's locations in Colorado, including Colorado Springs, Fountain, Woodland Park and Pueblo, abruptly shut down due to a franchise owner failing to pay nearly $200,000 in back taxes as well as over $30,000 in sales tax from the previous year. In addition, several employees claimed there were issues with accounts not being paid, bounced checks, and paychecks not arriving on time. As a result of the seizure of the eight Denny's locations by the IRS, numerous employees were left without employment and claimed that no advance warning was given regarding the sudden closures. The franchise owner, Abraham Imani, who was responsible for the closures immediately fled the state of Colorado. Not long later, the properties went up for auction. As of 2026, many of the former Denny's locations had been opened as new restaurants, two were demolished.

On January 31, 2024, a Denny's location in Oakland, California, permanently closed after 54 years of operation, citing the "safety and well-being" of customers and employees.

=== Ghost kitchens ===
With the advent of delivery services such as Grubhub, DoorDash and Uber Eats, Denny's has begun operating many ghost kitchens, such as The Meltdown, a late-night melt "virtual brand". The Meltdown serves Denny's menu items at an up-charge. Where the "Brisket Melt" is $16.69, The Meltdown's "Giddy Up Melt" was $18.72 in 2024, despite being an identical sandwich. Ghost kitchens have been described as a "cynical ploy" by big-brand restaurants to garner a new younger consumer base.

== See also ==
- List of pancake houses
- List of hamburger restaurants
