= Food Donation Connection =

Food Donation Connection, LLC
- Type: LLC
- Founded: 1992
- Founder: Bill Reighard
- Headquarters: Knoxville, Tennessee, US
- Area served: Worldwide
- Key people: Steve Dietz, Jim Larson
- Services: Coordination of prepared, perishable food donations
- Owner: Bill Reighard
- Number of employees: 31 (2026)
- Website: www.foodtodonate.com

Food Donation Connection (FDC), LLC headquartered in Knoxville, Tennessee, is a privately owned American company facilitating the donation process between restaurants/food service companies with surplus food and local social service agencies that distribute food to those in need. FDC's primary goal is to redirect prepared food that would otherwise be discarded towards feeding individuals facing hunger.

Founded in 1992 by Bill Reighard, a former restaurant executive, Food Donation Connection (FDC) operates from headquarters and a Harvest Support call center situated in Knoxville, Tennessee.

FDC facilitates the coordination of donations from client donors, including restaurants, college campuses, airports, grocery stores, convenience stores, food manufacturing facilities and hospitals, to food rescue agencies across the United States, Canada, and select overseas locations.

FDC assists its agency partners by assessing their current requirements and linking them with appropriate food service businesses capable of donating surplus, perishable, prepared food. This allows recipient agencies to allocate their resources towards fulfilling their primary mission rather than expending them on acquiring and preparing food.

== Donor partners ==
Since 1992, FDC has coordinated the donation of over one billion pounds of surplus prepared food from 1,300 food service businesses, which included 14,000 restaurants or donor locations.

As of 2021, FDC coordinates Harvest Food Donation Programs for 1,300 companies, which include various restaurants and food service companies. Including:

- ARAMARK
- Auntie Anne's
- Caribou Coffee
- Chipotle Mexican Grill
- Darden Restaurants (Olive Garden, LongHorn Steakhouse, The Capital Grille, Bahama Breeze, Seasons 52, Cheddar's Scratch Kitchen)
- Famous Dave's
- HMSHost
- Papa John's Pizza
- Red Lobster
- Yum! Brands (Pizza Hut, KFC, Taco Bell, The Habit Burger Grill)
- Wawa
- Whole Foods

== Harvest recipient partners ==
FDC actively facilitates the donation of surplus, wholesome prepared food to over 10,000 local agencies. These agencies represent a diverse array of organizations, including homeless shelters, teen homes, after-school programs, crisis shelters for women and children, soup kitchens, emergency food pantries, and food rescue organizations.

See also

- Donation
- Food Bank
- Soup kitchen
