= List of Orlando companies =

The following is a list of notable companies and organizations that have their corporate headquarters or a major presence in the Orlando, Florida area:

== Orlando companies ==
- AAA
- ABC Fine Wine & Spirits
- AdventHealth
- Amazon
- Alinean
- Aon Hewitt
- Atlantic.Net
- Campus Crusade for Christ
- Central Florida Expressway Authority
- CNL Financial Group
- CHEP
- Darden Restaurants
- Disney Parks, Experiences and Products
- Electronic Arts
- Florida's Turnpike Enterprise
- FoodFirst Global Restaurants
- Golf Channel
- Hilton Grand Vacations Club
- HostDime
- Houghton Mifflin Harcourt
- JetBlue
- HNTB
- Ligonier Ministries
- Lockheed Martin
- Loews Hotels
- Luctor International
- Lynx
- Marriott International
- Marriott Vacation Club International
- Miller's Ale House
- NBC Universal
- Nemours Foundation
- Oracle Corporation
- Orlando Health
- Pioneers
- Planet Hollywood
- PulteGroup
- Red Lobster
- Reed Elsevier
- Ruth's Chris Steakhouse
- Ryman Hospitality Properties
- Sanford-Burnham Medical Research Institute
- SAHARA Digital Agency
- Scholastic Book Fairs
- Siemens Power Generation
- Spectrum
- StackPath
- SunTrust Bank
- T. G. Lee Dairy
- Tijuana Flats
- Honest Abe Roofing Orlando
- Trinity Broadcasting Network
- Tupperware
- United Parks & Resorts
- Universal Destinations & Experiences
- The Walt Disney World Resort
- Westgate Resorts
- Wheeled Coach
- Wycliffe Bible Translators
- Wyndham Destinations (formerly part of Wyndham Worldwide, formerly part of Cendant)
- Yellow Corporation
