= DRQ =

DRQ may refer to:

- DMA request, a hardware event related to direct memory access functionality
- Dril-Quip, Inc., a company listed on the New York Stock Exchange as DRQ
- WUFL (FM), formerly WDRQ, Detroit radio station marketed as "The new DRQ"
- DRQ, the main character in the critically acclaimed videogame GODS
