= ABC store =

ABC store may refer to:

- ABC Fine Wine & Spirits, an American retail chain based in Florida
- ABC Shops, stores formerly operated by the ABC Commercial division of the Australian Broadcasting Corporation
- ABC Stores, an American Convenience-Stores chain based in Hawaii
- ABC stores, a common name for liquor stores operated by certain U.S. states
  - ABC states, a term referring to alcoholic beverage control states, U.S. states with a monopoly on the sale of some or all alcoholic beverages

== See also ==
- ABC (disambiguation)
