= Eddie V's Prime Seafood =

American seafood and steak restaurant chain

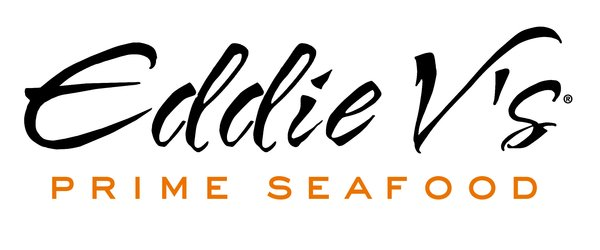
- Type: Division
- Industry: Restaurant
- Genre: Fine dining
- Founded: 2000; 26 years ago, in Austin, Texas, U.S.
- Founder: Guy Villavaso; Larry Foles
- Headquarters: 1000 Darden Center Drive; Orlando, Florida, U.S. 32837,
- Number of locations: 30 (January 2026)
- Area served: Texas, California, Colorado, Arizona, Florida, Massachusetts, New Jersey, Pennsylvania
- Key people: Eugene Lee, former CEO, retired 2022 (Interim CEO/Chairman of Darden and President of Darden's Specialty Restaurant Group); Guy Villavaso (Co-Founder); Larry Foles (Co-Founder); John Carver (Corporate Chef)
- Products: Seafood; Steak
- Parent: Darden Restaurants (2011–present)
- Website: eddiev.com

Eddie V's Prime Seafood is an American seafood and steak restaurant chain owned by Darden Restaurants.

== History ==
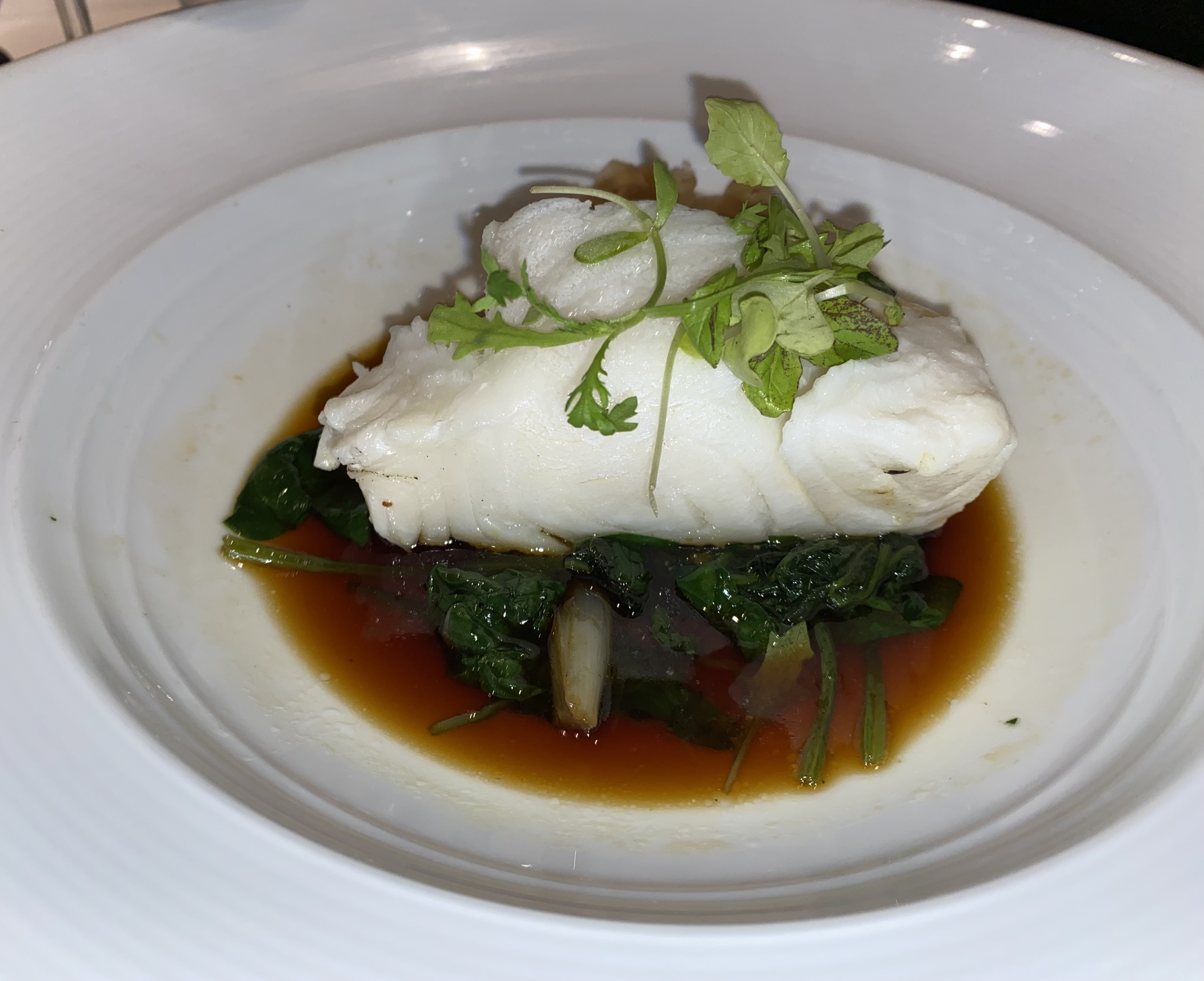
Chilean Sea Bass cooked "Hong Kong" style from Eddie V's in Fort Lauderdale, FL

The first Eddie V's was opened in Austin, Texas in 2000 by Guy Villavaso and Larry Foles. In 2011, the brand was sold for $59 million cash to Darden Restaurants, and became a part of Darden's Specialty Restaurant Group.

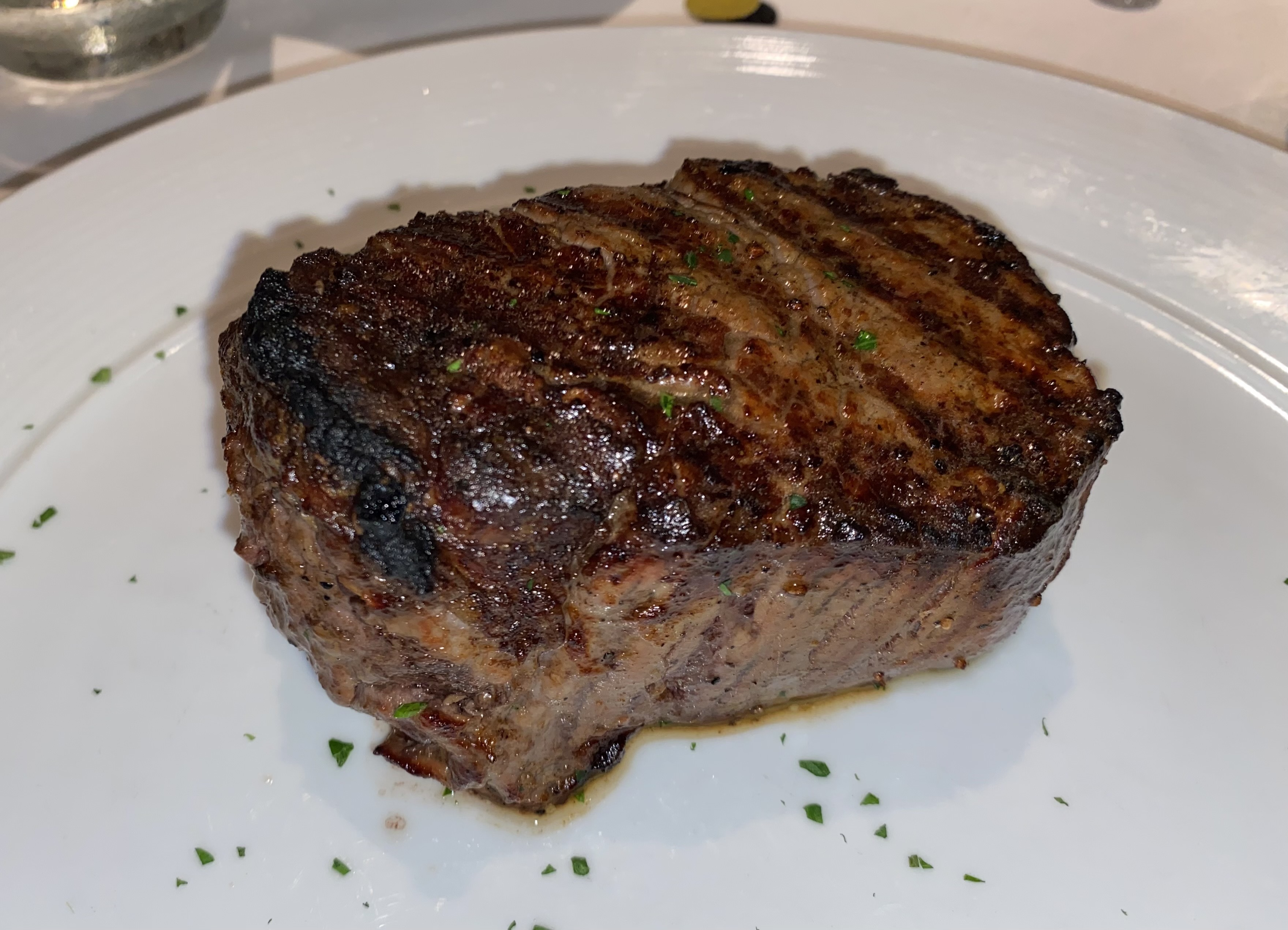
Filet Mignon from Eddie V's in Fort Lauderdale, FL

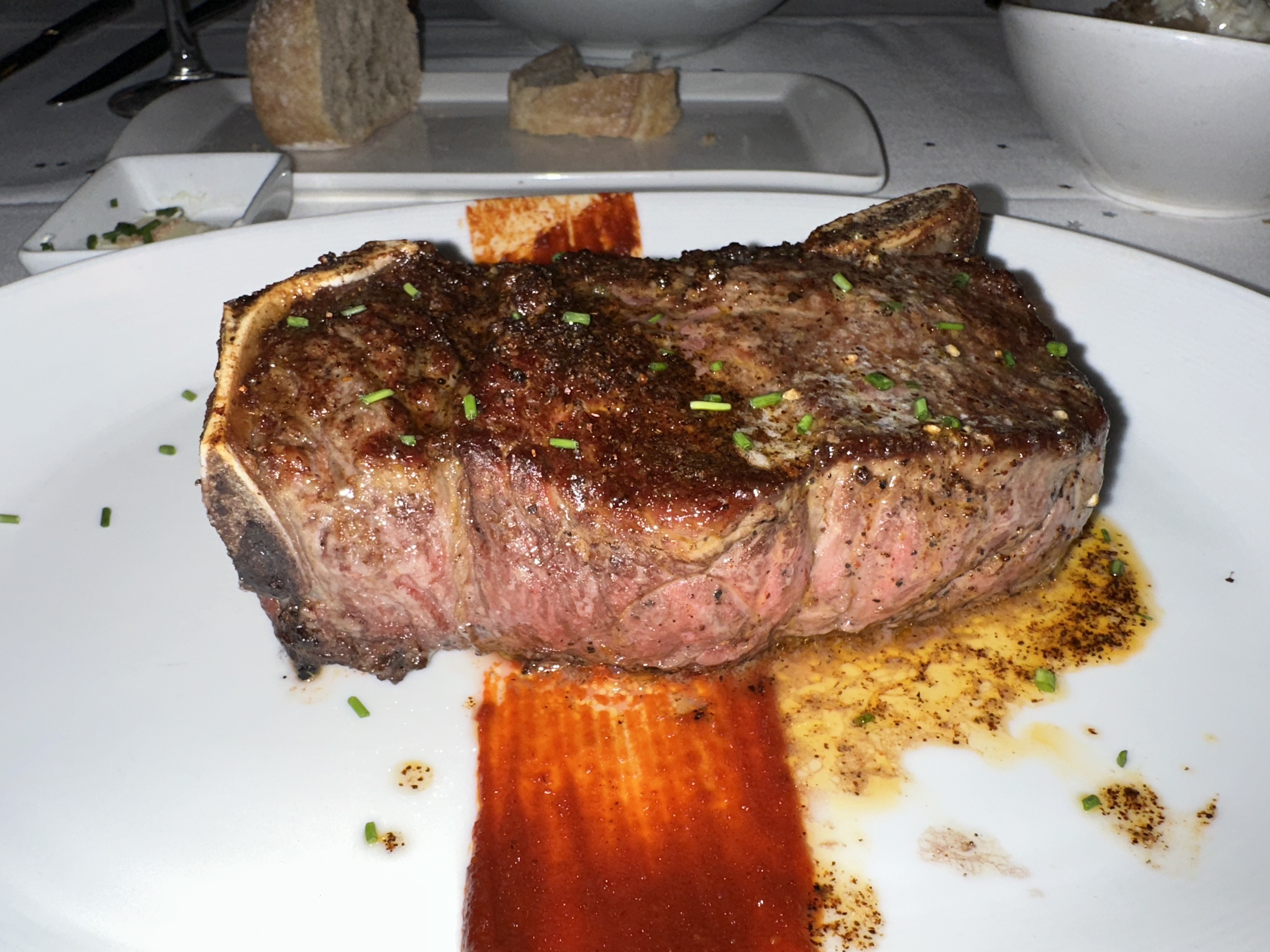
Chili-rubbed NY strip steak from Eddie V's in Boca Raton, Florida

== Locations ==
There are 32 Eddie V's restaurants across the United States.

== See also ==
- List of seafood restaurants
