= Yard House =

Restaurant

- Trade name: Yard House
- Company type: Division
- Industry: Restaurant
- Genre: Casual dining
- Founded: 1996; 30 years ago, in Long Beach, California, U.S.
- Founder: Steele Platt, Steve Reynolds, Tom Yelenick, Bill Wollrab
- Headquarters: Orlando, Florida, U.S.
- Number of locations: 88 (January 2024)
- Products: American cuisine (pasta • salads • chicken • seafood), gluten sensitive menu
- Parent: Darden Restaurants, Inc.
- Website: www.yardhouse.com

Darden Concepts, Inc. doing business as Yard House, is an American restaurant chain, with 80+ locations across the United States. Yard House was purchased by Darden Restaurants in 2012 for $585 million and now operates out of Orlando, Florida.

== History ==
Yard House was founded in 1996 in Long Beach, California, by Steele Platt, Tom Yelenick, William Wollrab and Steve Reynolds. The Yard House began its East Coast expansion in 2010, with a restaurant in the Legacy Place lifestyle center in the Boston suburb of Dedham. In mainland China, Yard House USA, Inc. and Darden do not own the Yard House brand; unaffiliated restaurants are operated by a domestic restaurant group.

== Menu ==
The restaurant offers a variety of food and focuses on fusion dishes. The menu includes several Gardein based items. It also has a major focus on craft beer. Locations have over 100 beers on tap and offer tasting platters of different types of beers.
