= China Coast =

American restaurant chain

- Company type: Wholly owned subsidiary
- Industry: Restaurants
- Genre: Casual dining
- Founded: 1990; 36 years ago
- Defunct: 1995; 31 years ago
- Headquarters: Orlando, Florida, United States
- Number of locations: 51
- Area served: United States Of America
- Products: American Chinese cuisine
- Parent: Darden Restaurants Inc.

China Coast was a casual dining American restaurant chain owned by Darden Restaurants Inc., specializing in American Chinese cuisine.

Founded in 1990 in Orlando, Florida, China Coast was intended to join Olive Garden and Red Lobster as Darden's signature properties. It had been expected by executives to become the top Chinese-style restaurant chain in the U.S. by the latter half of the 1990s, but abruptly closed in 1995 due to poor reception and mounting financial losses.

== Restaurants ==
The menu featured Americanized dishes at low prices, with Western cutlery, Chinese chopsticks, and introductory chopsticks for children available. The signature menu item was "China Coast Bread," which was fried and served with an almond spread. Entrees were inspired by Sichuan, Cantonese, and Beijing cuisine, and also included Taiwanese dishes like Mongolian beef. In addition to traditional Chinese dishes like hot and sour soup, zhajiangmian, and wonton soup, the menu included American items that were given Chinese-inspired names, like a dish of barbecue ribs and French fries that was listed on the menu as "dragon bones." The dessert menu exclusively featured American items, including "Double Happiness Cheesecake" and chocolate brownies.

Built at an average cost of US$2 million each, China Coast restaurants were designed to resemble pagodas and included open-air kitchens, bamboo and silk design elements, and decorations imported from China. By using open-air kitchens and table-side cooking, kitchen staff could cater the intensity of spices to each diner's preferences. Waitstaff were dressed in Americanized Chinese clothing, including satin tunics.

== Decline ==
After operating several successful locations in the Orlando area, China Coast began a rapid and ill-fated national expansion in 1993, ultimately resulting in its demise. Initial industry analyses projected success due to Americans liking Chinese food but not knowing how to cook it themselves at home. However, problems quickly mounted, including negative reviews, poor service, inadequate staff training, expensive physical design, and a complicated concept and process that were cited by the company as factors contributing to the chain's downfall. Industry analysts noted the chain's inconsistency with service and food quality, as well as expensive construction and land costs in high-profile commercial districts. Although the company sought to become customers' preferred option over local, independent Chinese restaurants, China Coast struggled to attract diners who preferred more authentic food and were committed to locally owned Chinese restaurants.

In 1994, expansion plans were halted after reaching a peak of 52 China Coast restaurants, up from nine at the beginning of the year. At the time of the chain's closing in August 1995, it operated 51 locations with about 3,000 employees in the United States. Darden spent more than US$100 million on the chain, which never turned a profit and was losing about US$7 million per quarter at the time of its closure. The chain also struggled to sell its empty locations, due to high land costs and expensive conversions needed to change the buildings' unusual design.

== See also ==
- List of Chinese restaurants
