= York Steak House =

Former chain of American steakhouses

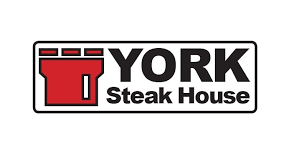

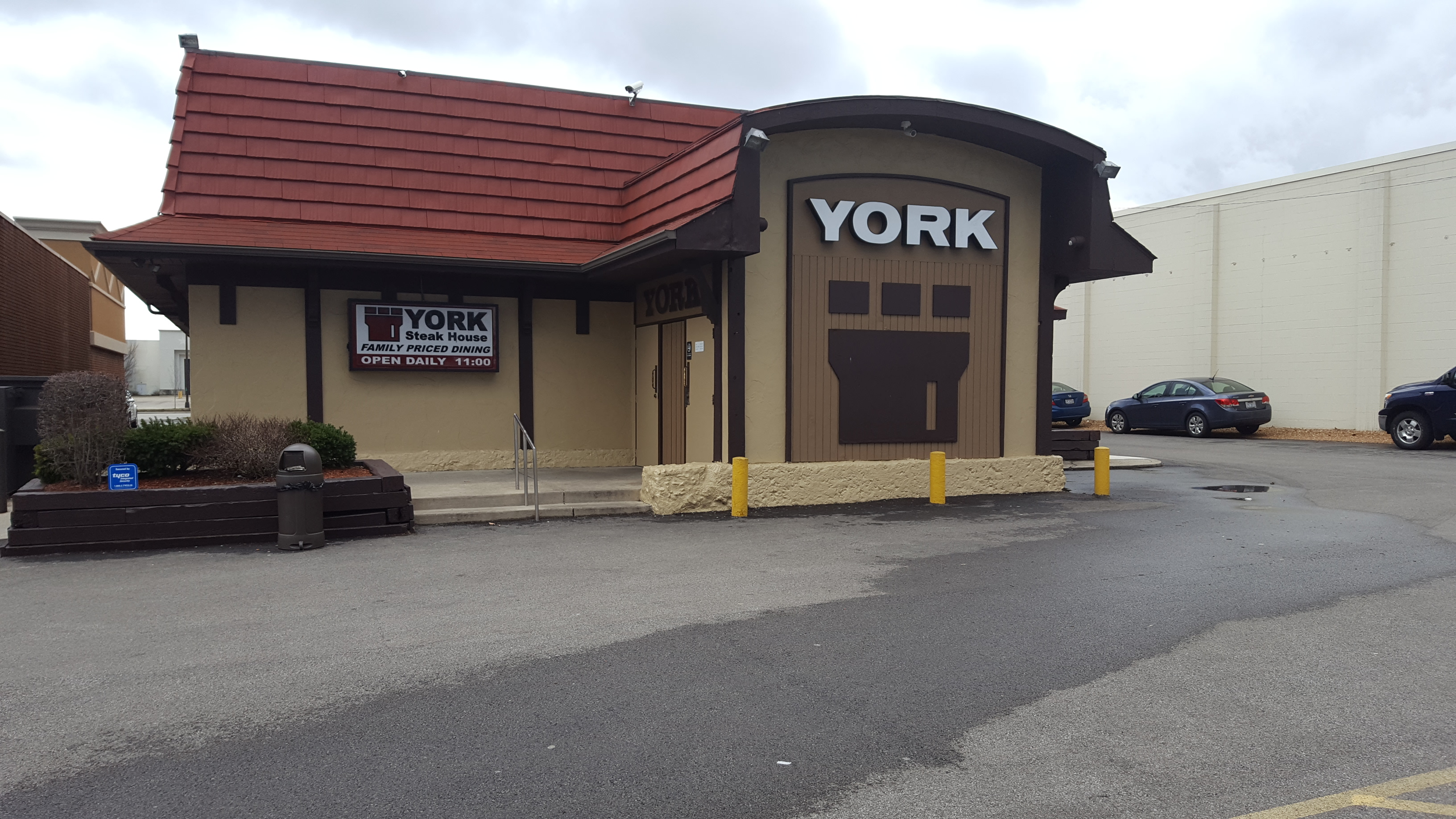
- Last remaining York Steakhouse in Columbus, OH in March 2017
- Type: Subsidiary (1977–1989)
- Industry: Restaurant
- Founded: 1966; 60 years ago in Columbus, Ohio, U.S.
- Founders: Eddie Grayson and Bernie Gros
- Defunct: 1989; 37 years ago (as chain)
- Fate: Ceased operations as a chain (independently-owned franchises continued on after 1989)
- Headquarters: Columbus, Ohio, U.S.
- Number of locations: 200 (1982); 1 (2022)
- Area served: Midwestern and Eastern United States
- Products: Steak
- Owner: Tim Burkhammer (Columbus location)
- Parent: General Mills (1977–c. 1989); Independent franchises (1989–2015)
- Website: theyorksteakhouse.com

York Steak House was a national chain of steakhouse restaurants in the United States. It was among several chains owned at the time by cereal manufacturer General Mills. By 1982, there were nearly 200 restaurants in 27 states from Texas to Maine. Though popular in the late 1970s and early 1980s, the majority of its locations shut down in 1989.

The fate of the rest of the chain after 1989 still remains unclear. One source reported that the remaining York Steak House chain was eventually purchased by Uno Restaurant Holdings Corporation, while other sources reported that the remaining York Steak House chain was sold in 1989 to U.S.A. Cafes Inc., a major franchisee of Bonanza Steakhouses, for conversion to the Bonanza brand.

The restaurants, located primarily in shopping malls, generally had a floorplan of a cafeteria: cold items on one side, hot items on the other, with the cashier at the end. The decor was composed of subdued lighting, heavy wooden furniture, and iron chandeliers.

The restaurants were run cafeteria style, with a-la-carte pricing of items. Tipping was not allowed at any of its restaurants. There was an extra charge for pats of butter and sour cream.

== History ==
The first York Steak House was opened in 1966 by Eddie Grayson and Bernie Gros in Columbus, Ohio. The second unit of the chain was built and operated by Grayson's brother Howard inside the Maine Mall in South Portland, Maine, when the mall first opened in 1971.

In April 1977, York Steak House was purchased by General Mills. At the time of the acquisition, York had 47 units. Another source claimed that York had 150 at the time of its sale to General Mills.

In the early 1980s, many of the York Steak House locations were converted into a new concept called York's Choices, which featured a round bakery case/kiosk that sold its signature cakes and pies at the front of the store.

Although it is not very clear when General Mills disposed of the York Steak House chain, it is known that York Steak House was not part of General Mills' portfolio of restaurant chains when Darden Restaurants was spun off in 1995.

After General Mills sold the chain, a limited number of York Steak Houses continued to operate for several years as independent restaurants. As of 2025, only one York Steak House remains in operation, in Columbus, Ohio, near the now-demolished Westland Mall. This location became an independently-owned franchised operation in 1989 owned by Jay Bettin. It largely retains the signature look and cafeteria-style format of the former chain. Jay Bettin retired in July 2024 and sold the lone restaurant to Tim Burkhammer.

The single restaurant abandoned their website domains "york-steakhouse.com" and "theyorksteakhouse.com" by mid-2025. The restaurant was almost closed by the state of Ohio for failure of paying unpaid sales taxes in February 2026.

== Notes ==
- Van Warner, Rick (December 18, 1989). "GM Restaurants sprints for next summit". Nation's Restaurant News. 23 (51). Archived from the original on September 9, 2004 – via FindArticles.
- Bernstein, Charles (December 18, 1989). "How to succeed through failure: the General Mills Restaurants story". Nation's Restaurant News. 23 (51). Archived from the original on April 4, 2005 – via FindArticles.
- A review of the Columbus, Ohio York Steak House, written in 2007 (accessed August 14, 2015 via archive.org).
