= Chuy's =

American Tex-Mex restaurant chain

Chuy's Opco, Inc.

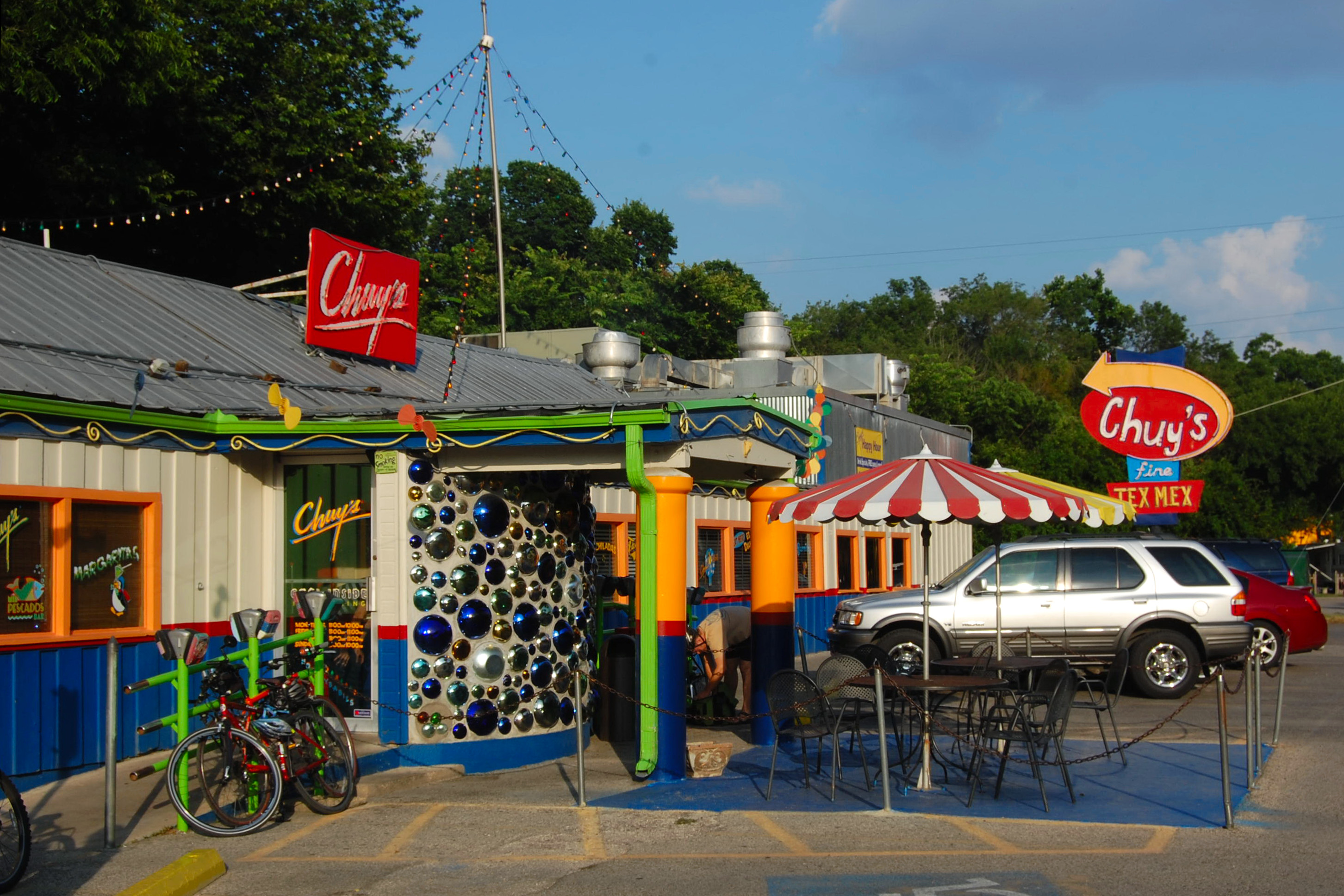
- The original Chuy's on Barton Springs Road in Austin, Texas
- Trade name: Chuy's
- Type: Subsidiary
- Industry: Restaurant
- Founded: 1982; 44 years ago
- Founders: Mike Young; John Zapp
- Headquarters: Austin, Texas, United States
- Number of locations: 100 (2023)
- Area served: United States
- Key people: Steve Hislop (CEO)
- Revenue: ▲US$422 million (2022)
- Number of employees: 7,400 (2022)
- Parent: Darden Restaurants
- Website: chuys.com

Chuy's Opco, Inc. is an American Tex-Mex restaurant chain founded in 1982 in Austin, Texas, by Mike Young and John Zapp. As of July 2024, Chuy's had 101 restaurants across 15 states in Arkansas, Louisiana, Colorado, Texas, Virginia, Florida, Ohio, Indiana, Tennessee, Georgia, Alabama, Kentucky, Oklahoma, North Carolina, and South Carolina.

== History ==
Chuy's was founded by Mike Young and John Zapp, and the first Chuy's location opened in 1982 on Barton Springs Road in Austin, Texas.

On May 31, 2001, then President George W. Bush's twin daughters, Jenna Bush and Barbara Bush, were cited for using fake IDs at the Barton Springs Road Chuy's, which put Chuy's in the national spotlight.

In 2009, Chuy's opened its first restaurant outside of Texas, in Franklin, Tennessee. A second location outside of Texas opened in March 2010 in Murfreesboro, Tennessee, followed that summer by locations in Birmingham, Alabama and Louisville, Kentucky.

On July 24, 2012, Chuy's went public with a $75.8 million dollar IPO. At that time they operated 36 locations in 7 states.

Cofounder Mike Young died on August 11, 2023, at the age of 74.

In July 2024, Darden Restaurants agreed to acquire Chuy's in an all-cash deal valued at $605 million. The acquisition was completed on October 11, 2024.

== Menu ==
Chuy's serves Tex-Mex cuisine, such as enchiladas, fajitas, tacos, and burritos as well as alcoholic cocktails. The food is prepared in each restaurant.

== Charitable contributions ==
Chuy’s Children Giving to Children Parade has annually collected toys to be distributed to underprivileged children via the Operation Blue Santa's city of Austin Police Department not-for-profit organization since 1988.

== See also ==
- List of Mexican restaurants
