= William Darden =

Founder of Red Lobster

William Bristor Darden
- Born: William Bristor Darden; November 17, 1918; White Plains, Georgia, US
- Died: March 29, 1994 (aged 75); Orlando, Florida, US
- Resting place: Doctor Phillips Cemetery; Orlando, Florida
- Occupations: Darden Restaurants, Red Lobster
- Known for: Founder of Red Lobster
- Spouse: Mary Green
- Children: 3

William Bristor Darden (November 17, 1918 – March 29, 1994), known as Bill, was an American businessman and the founder of the Red Lobster restaurant franchise. He is also the namesake of the multi-brand restaurant operator Darden Restaurants, which considers Darden to be its founder.

== Early life ==
When Darden was 19 years old, he opened his first restaurant, called The Green Frog, in Waycross, Georgia. The restaurant's slogan was "Service with a Hop". Going against the state's laws at the time, Darden refused to racially segregate the patrons.

The Green Frog was highly successful, and Darden decided to invest in Howard Johnson's hotels and restaurants.

== Career ==
In 1968, Darden founded the first Red Lobster restaurant in Lakeland, Florida, an inland city. The restaurant was initially called the Red Lobster Inn. Darden was inspired by Gary's Duck Inn, an Orlando seafood restaurant that Darden bought in 1963 with some partners.

The business became so successful that Darden opened four more restaurants. In 1970, General Mills made Darden an offer to purchase the franchise. Darden became an executive within the General Mills company.

Darden left a positive impact on those around him during his professional career. He was described as "tough and personable". Joe R. Lee, vice chairman of General Mills and one of Darden's business associates, said, "I know of no other person who has touched so many lives in a positive way as Bill Darden." Dick Monroe, vice president of Red Lobster public relations, recalled an interaction with Darden in an elevator before the two had been formally introduced: "He knew things about me that probably my boss didn't even know. He just had a real people personality, and I saw that in the culture of the company."
