= Alinean =

Software company based in Florida

Alinean, Inc.
- Type: privately held
- Industry: Sales & Marketing Software
- Founded: September 2001 in Orlando, Florida
- Headquarters: Winter Park
- Website: alinean.com

Alinean, Inc. is a privately held company founded in September 2001 in Orlando, Florida by Tom Pisello. Alinean develops sales and marketing software. The company offers services to analyze different technology products and business services. Its offerings include Alinean Interactive White Papers, a demand generation tool for B2B marketers.

== History ==
The Orlando Sentinel reported that between 2007 and 2010, the company experienced 20-30% growth. In 2010, Alinean was ranked number 2942 in the top companies from Inc. The site reported a three-year growth of 73 percent. In the same year, Alinean received several awards. Grow FL awarded Alinean a Florida Company to Watch recognition. Inc. 5000 identified Alinean as one of the fastest growing companies.
