= Bahama Breeze =

American restaurant chain

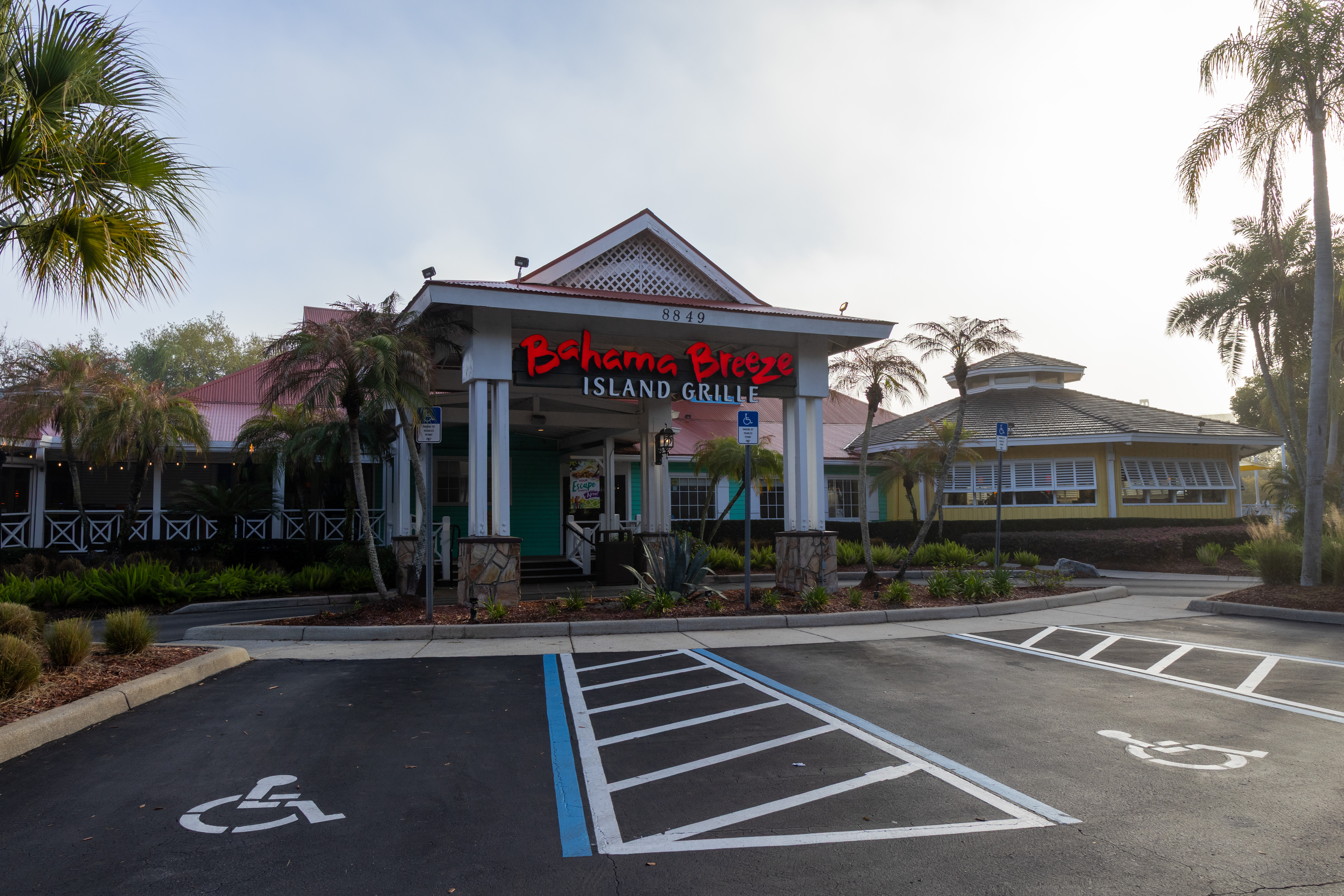
- A Bahama Breeze location in Orlando, Florida
- Trade name: Bahama Breeze
- Type: Division
- Industry: Restaurant Franchising
- Genre: Casual dining
- Founded: 1996; 30 years ago, in Orlando, Florida
- Headquarters: 1000 Darden Center Drive; Orlando, Florida, U.S. 32837
- Number of locations: 14 (April 2026)
- Key people: Eugene I. Lee, Jr. (chairman and CEO of Darden)
- Products: tropical food and american cuisine
- Parent: Darden Restaurants (1996–present)
- Website: bahamabreeze.com

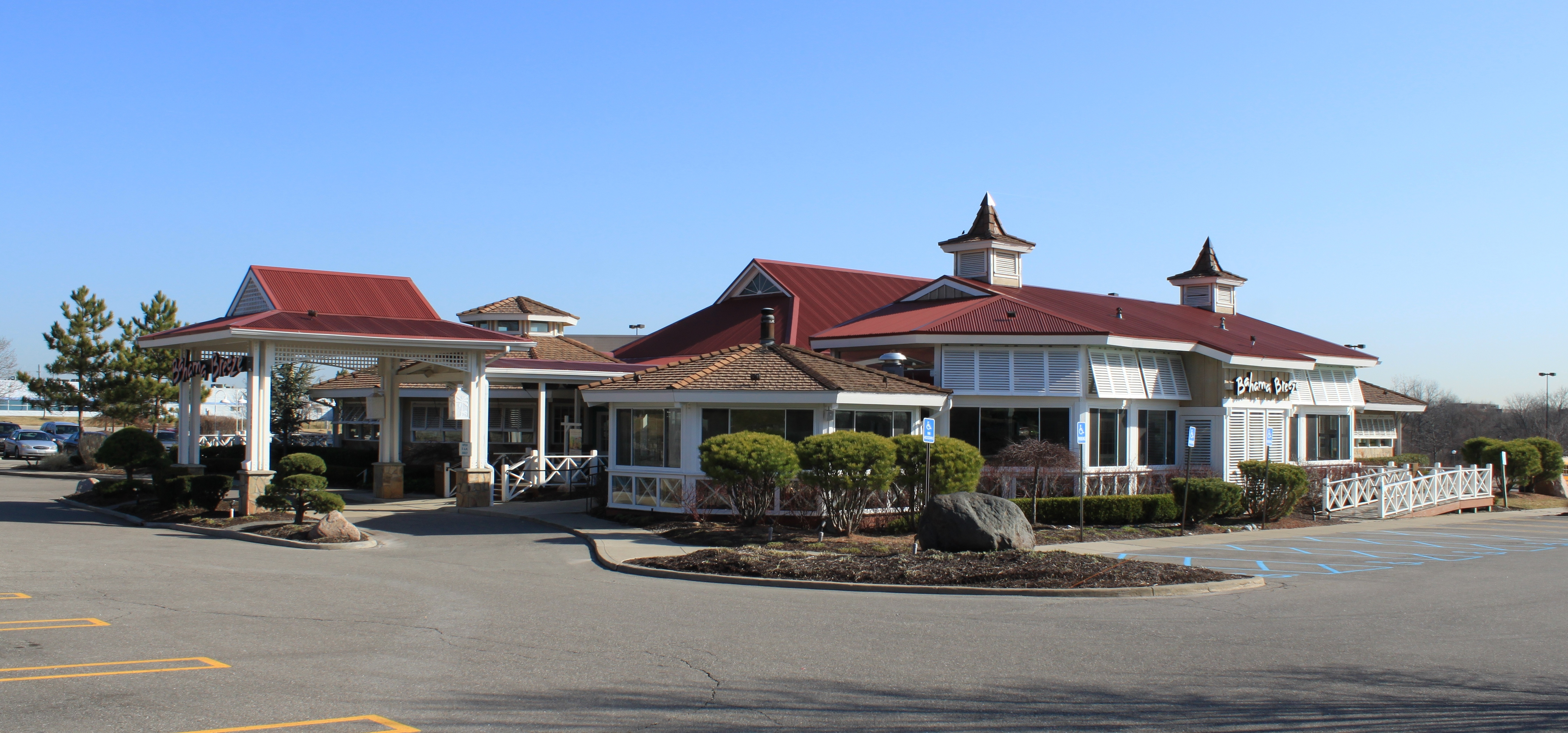
A Bahama Breeze in Livonia, Michigan.

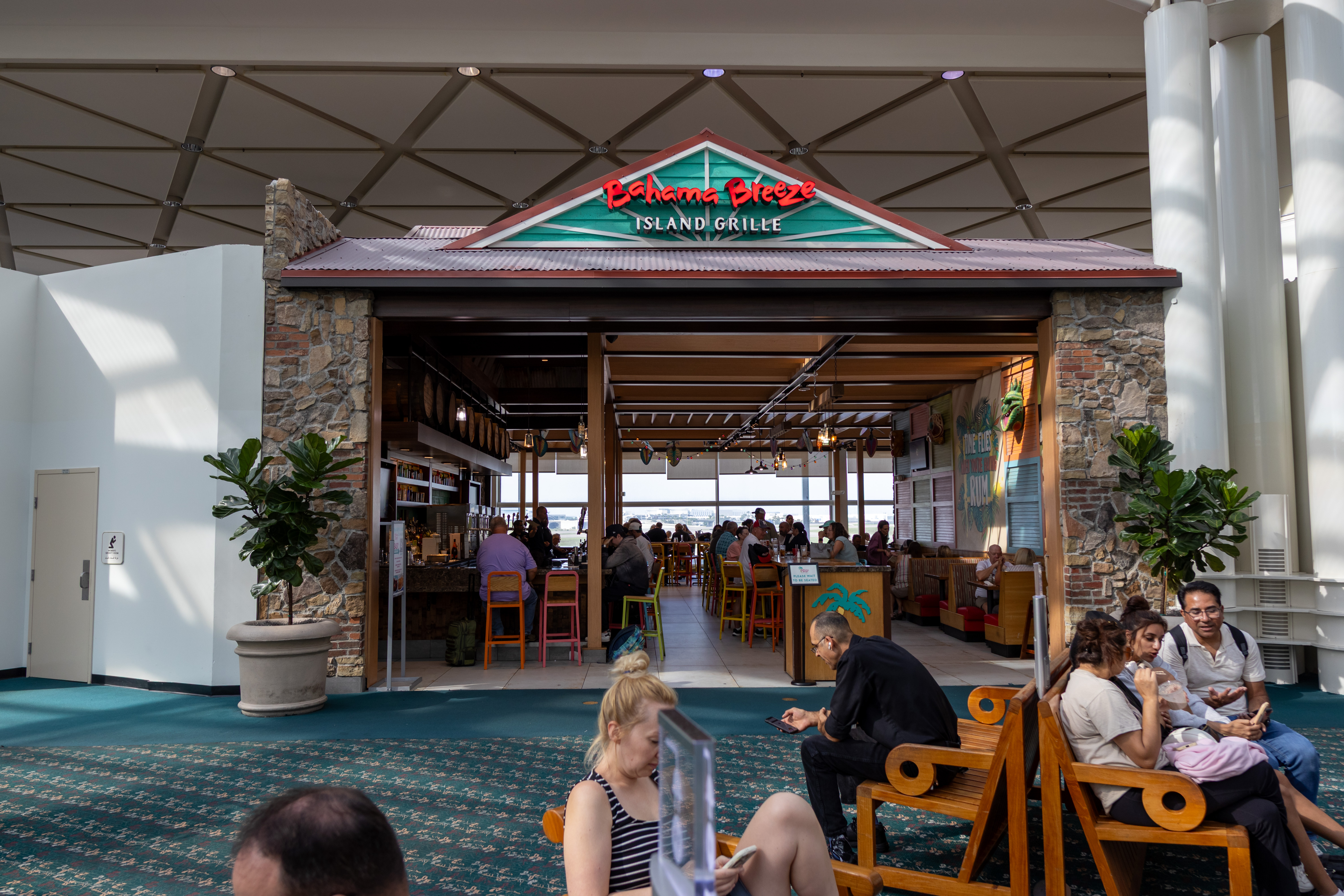
A Bahama Breeze location inside Terminal B at Orlando International Airport in Orlando, Florida.

Darden Concepts, Inc. doing business as Bahama Breeze, is an American restaurant chain owned by Darden Restaurants. They specialize in Caribbean-inspired seafood, chicken, steaks, and tropical drinks.

== History ==
Founded in 1996 by Darden Restaurants, their first location was in Orlando, Florida on International Drive. As of April 2014, there were 43 Bahama Breeze locations in the United States. Most locations are in suburban retail districts and tourist areas, and about half of the locations are in Florida.

In May 2025, 15 restaurants were closed that included all locations in New York, Nevada, Massachusetts, and Tennessee, with some of the Florida locations and all but one of the New Jersey locations closing. The restaurant chain has 29 locations left. The closures have been attributed to a decrease in sales of 7.7% in 2024. In June 2025, Darden planned to close, sell, or rebrand the remaining 29 Bahama Breeze locations, citing a lack of "strategic priority" for the chain. In February 2026, it was announced that all locations will close by April 5 of that year, following struggling inflation and decline. Ultimately, some of the locations closed on that date, while others, primarily in Florida, will remain open for conversion.
