= Pioneers (missions agency) =

Christian organization

- Founded: 1979
- Founder: Ted Fletcher
- Type: Evangelical Missions Agency
- Location: Orlando, Florida
- Region served: 97 countries
- Members: 3077 (345 teams)
- Key people: Ted Fletcher, Peggy Fletcher, John Fletcher, Steve Richardson
- Website: www.pioneers.org
- Formerly called: World Evangelical Outreach

Pioneers is a Christian missions organization focused on church planting among unreached people groups. It was founded by former Wall Street Journal National Sales Manager Ted Fletcher in 1979 and has offices in Orlando, Florida, Australia, Ghana, Canada, New Zealand, the UK, Singapore, and Brazil. Pioneers operates in 97 countries, training and supporting 3,077 international members serving on 345 teams among 207 people groups in 154 languages.

Pioneers was originally called World Evangelical Outreach and adopted its current name in 1984. It was formed in response to Ralph D. Winter's description of the task of the church as reaching unreached ethnolinguistic people groups, and "set out to practice good missiology by contextualizing its mission and message to a postmodern missionary generation."
