= Cheddar's Scratch Kitchen =

American restaurant chain

Darden Concepts, Inc.
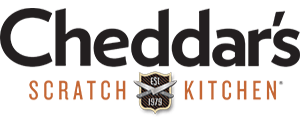

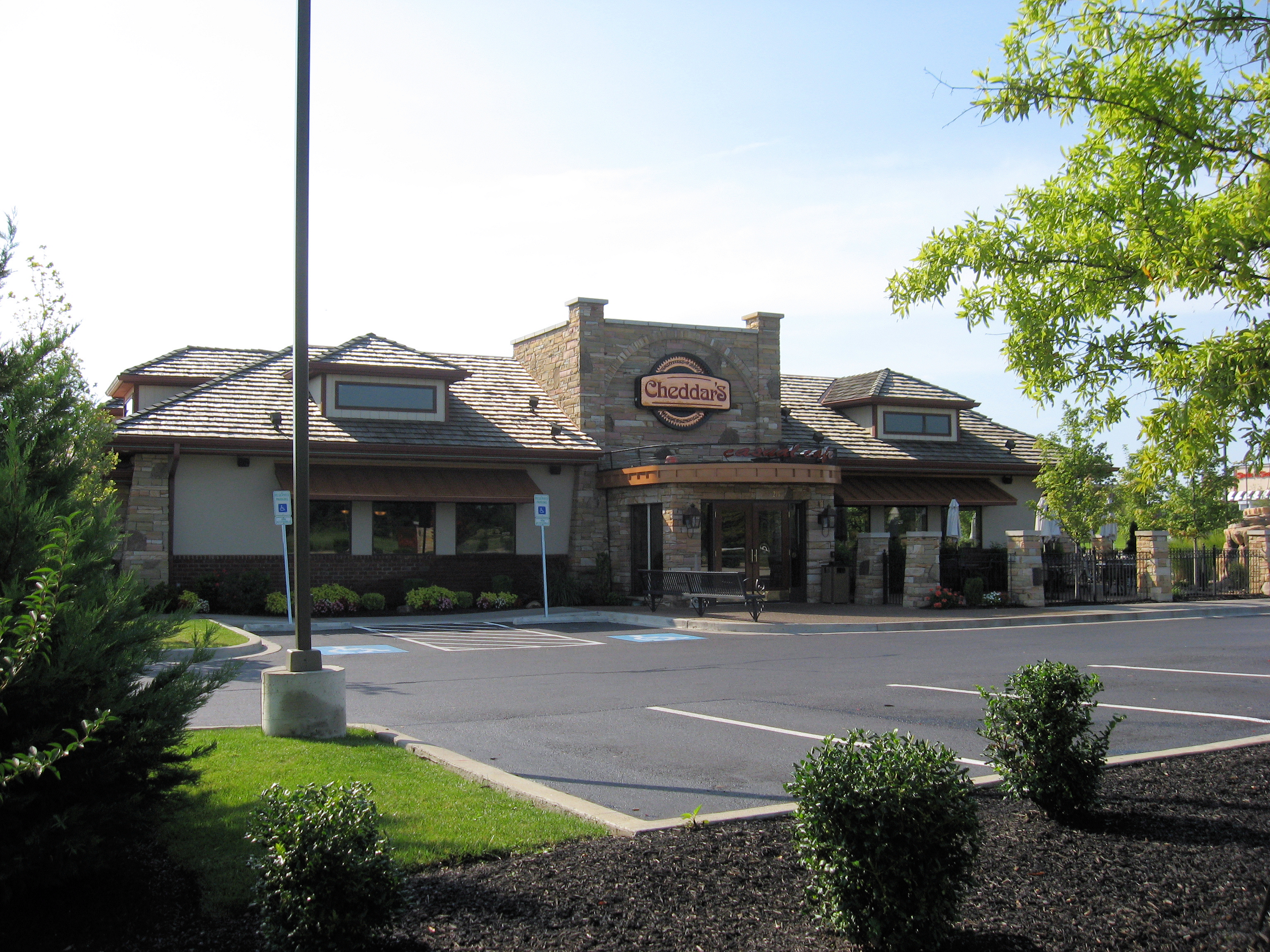
- A Cheddar's in Hendersonville, Tennessee
- Trade name: Cheddar's Scratch Kitchen
- Formerly: Cheddar's Burgers n' Such (1979–1981); Cheddar's Casual Cafe (1981–2015)
- Type: Division
- Industry: Restaurant
- Founded: 1979; 47 years ago in Arlington, Texas
- Founders: Aubrey Good; Doug Rogers
- Headquarters: Orlando, Florida, U.S.
- Number of locations: 185 company-owned and franchise locations (Jan. 2024)
- Key people: John Wilkerson (President)
- Revenue: $751 million (2023)
- Number of employees: 23,000 (2023)
- Parent: Darden Restaurants (2017–present)
- Website: cheddars.com

Darden Concepts, Inc. doing business as Cheddar's Scratch Kitchen, formerly known as Cheddar's Casual Cafe, is an American restaurant chain based in Orlando, Florida owned by Darden Restaurants. Founded in 1979, the company has more than 170 locations in 28 states as of 2018.

== History ==
In 1979, Aubrey Good and Doug Rogers opened the first Cheddar's Casual Cafe in Arlington, Texas. The name was proposed by a 5th-grade class when the founders asked for restaurant name suggestions. The chain reached 10 locations by 1995.

By 2003, Cheddar's generated $150 million in revenue from 42 restaurants in 13 states and Brazos Private Equity Partners made an initial investment to grow the company that year. In August 2006, when the company generated $245 million in revenue from 55 restaurants in 15 states, Oak Investment Partners and L Catterton Partners jointly purchased Cheddar's.

In August 2007, the company recruited Kelly Baltes from Darden Restaurants as CEO.

In October 2014, Ian Baines was brought on as president and CEO, after being CEO and president at Uno Restaurant Holdings Corporation. Throughout his career, he has held various roles of increased responsibility with Darden Restaurants and Brinker International, Inc.

In 2015, the company changed its name to Cheddar's Scratch Kitchen.

In 2017, Cheddar's Scratch Kitchen acquired forty-four franchised units located in Ohio, Kentucky, Virginia, North Carolina, Tennessee and West Virginia from their "largest franchisee" Greer Companies, who is based in Kentucky. This brought their portfolio up to 164 corporate owned restaurants.

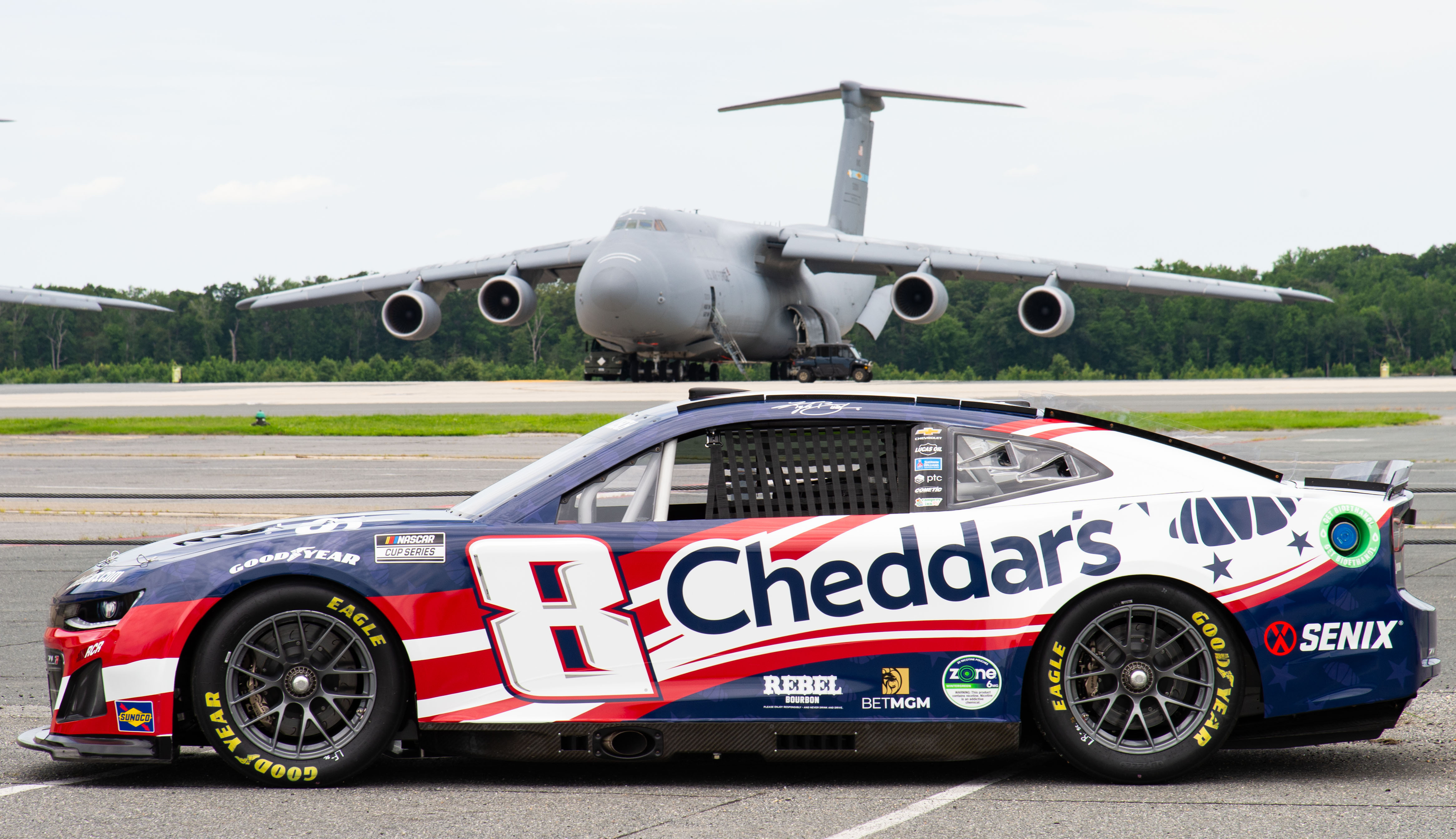
Kyle Busch's NASCAR sponsored by Cheddars

On March 27, 2017, Darden Restaurants announced its intent to acquire Cheddar's from shareholders such as L Catterton and Oak Investment Partners for $780 million plus another $10 million for transaction-related expenses. On March 28, 2017, when Darden announced it that had acquired Cheddar's Scratch Kitchen, Darden became the biggest gainer that day on the S&P 500. The acquisition was completed on April 24, 2017.

== See also ==
- List of restaurant chains
- List of food companies
- List of casual dining restaurant chains
