= The Capital Grille =

American restaurant chain

- Trade name: The Capital Grille
- Type: Division
- Industry: Restaurant
- Genre: Fine dining
- Founded: 1990; 36 years ago, in Providence, Rhode Island
- Founder: Ned Grace
- Headquarters: 1000 Darden Center Drive; Orlando, Florida, U.S. 32837
- Number of locations: 74 (October 2025)
- Key people: Eugene Lee (chairman and CEO of Darden)
- Products: USDA Choice Steaks
- Parent: Rare Hospitality International (1990–2007); Darden Restaurants (2007–present)
- Website: thecapitalgrille.com

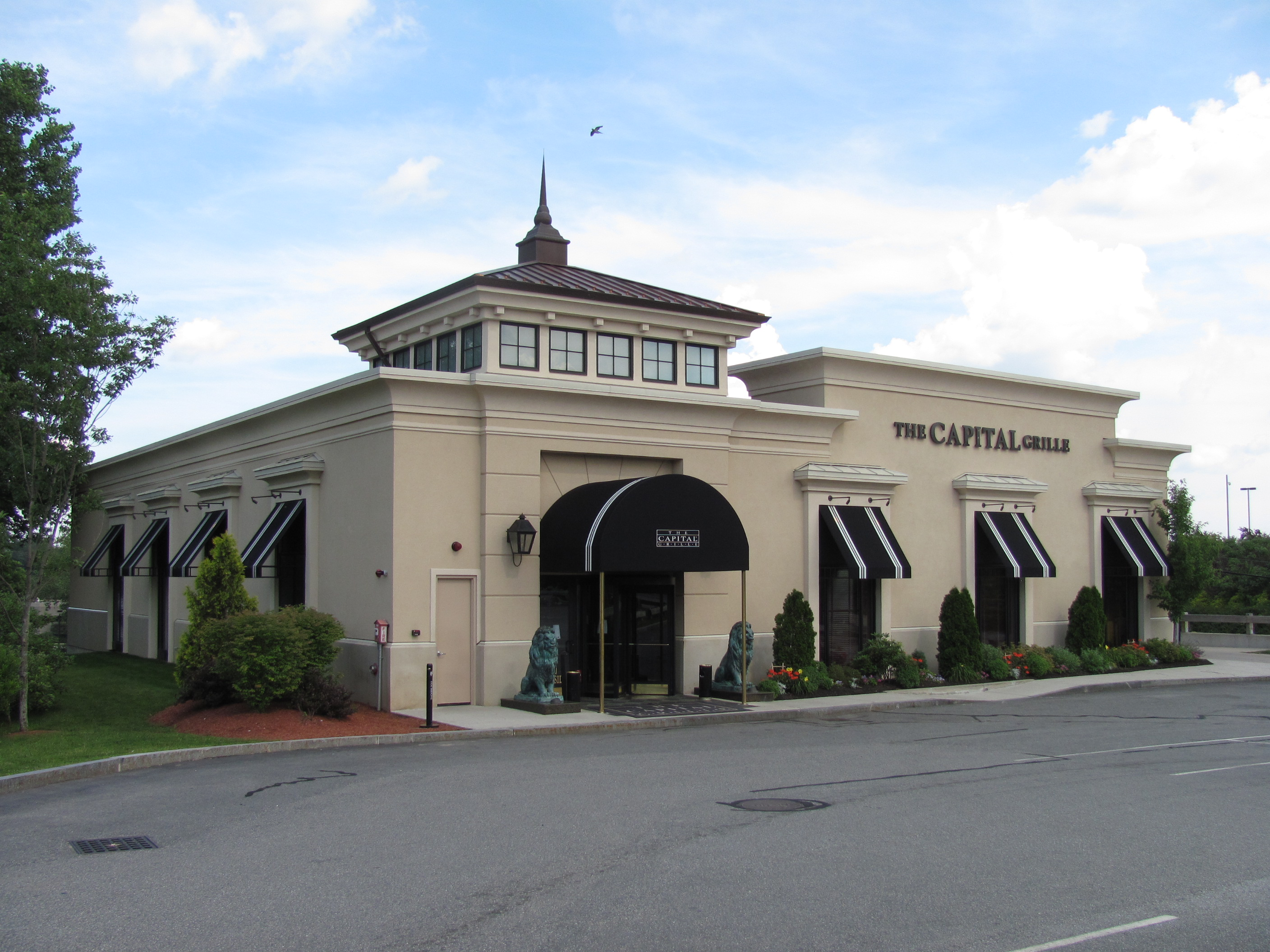
The Capital Grille at Wayside Commons in Burlington, Massachusetts

Darden Concepts, Inc. doing business as The Capital Grille, is an American restaurant chain of upscale steakhouses owned by Darden Restaurants. The brand has locations in twenty-five states, the District of Columbia, and Mexico City. There are 74 locations, including one location in Costa Rica.

== History ==
The original Capital Grille was founded by Ned Grace, in Providence, Rhode Island, in 1990. The opening was curious for several reasons: the upscale steakhouse contrasted with the then-rundown downtown area of Providence, and the opening occurred amid an ongoing recession. Grace envisioned the restaurant being popular with business and political elite, and his ideas proved to be accurate. Seven years after opening, the original location pulled in over $4 million in annual sales.

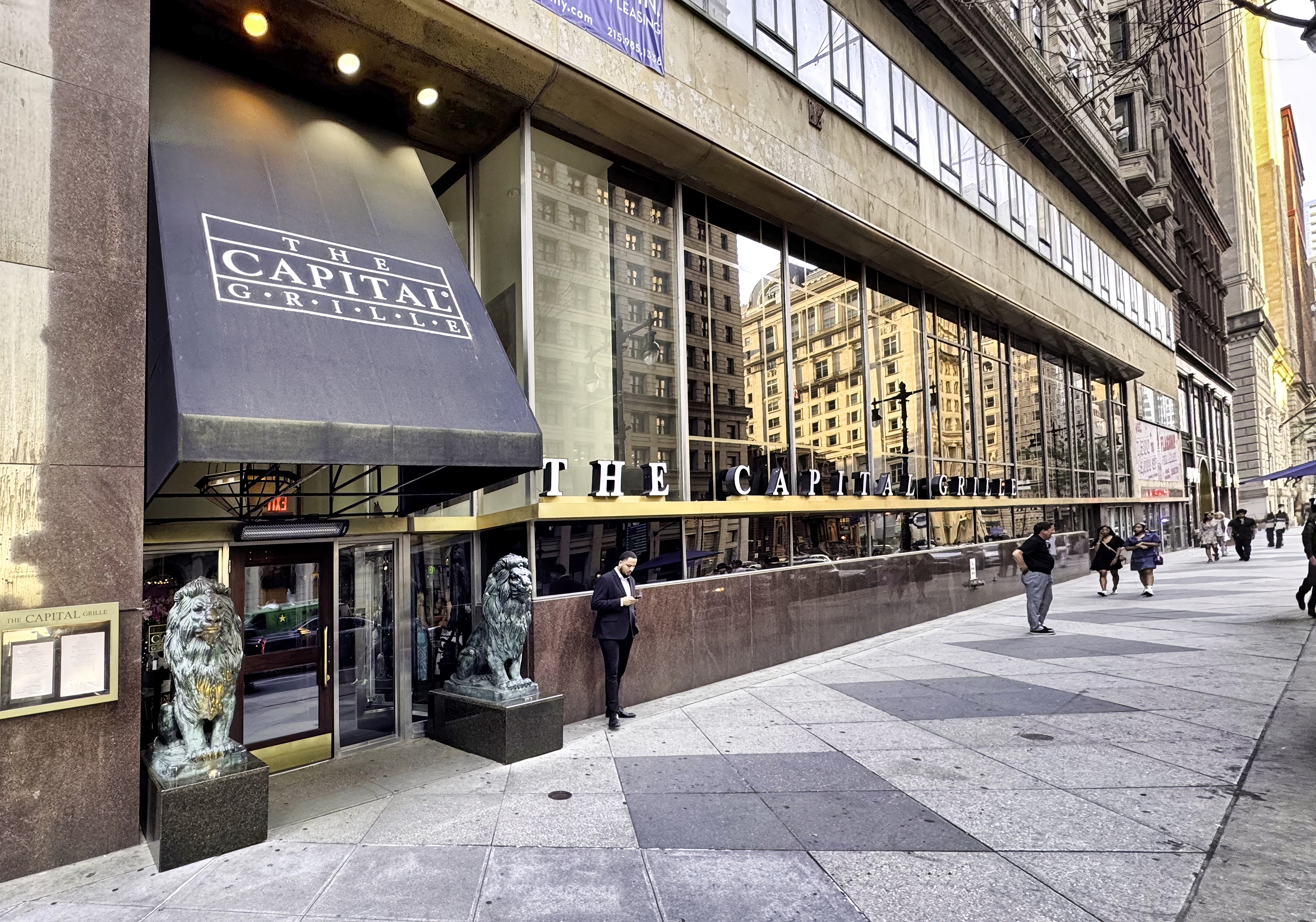
The Capital Grille in Philadelphia

Under the leadership of Grace's Bugaboo Creek Steak House Inc. (the name of Grace's other chain), the chain expanded to several major markets. By 1996, The Capital Grille had locations in the nation's capital of Washington, D.C. and Boston, along with Pittsburgh. In 1997, aided by a $20 million credit line from two banks, it expanded with four more locations. Bugaboo Creek Steak House Inc. went public in 1994, and later changed its name to RARE Hospitality International, Inc. According to The Washington Business Journal, the chain was acquired by Darden Restaurants as a "part of a $1.19 billion acquisition of RARE Hospitality in 2007".

The Capital Grille operates under the Specialty Restaurant Group division of Darden. In March 2018, a spinoff restaurant called The Capital Burger was opened in Washington, DC. In January 2020, The Capital Burger opened their second location in Reston, Virginia.

== Lawsuit ==
In 2012, employees in five states filed lawsuits against the company alleging racial discrimination and wage violations. The lawsuit alleges that the company favored white workers over people of color for lucrative tipped jobs as well as requiring tipped workers to share their earnings with non-tipped workers.

== Thanksgiving controversy ==
In 2013, the Capital Grille in Pittsburgh, Pennsylvania was open for Thanksgiving for the first time in its history. Capital Grille employees at the Pittsburgh location and members of the Restaurant Opportunities Center protested having to work on Thanksgiving without receiving holiday pay. In addition, the Pittsburgh City Council passed a resolution opposing Capital Grille's decision to force employees to work on Thanksgiving without holiday pay.
