= HostDime =

American data center infrastructure provider

HostDime Global Corp
- Company type: Private company
- Founded: 2003; 23 years ago
- Headquarters: Orlando, Florida, United States
- Founder: Manny Vivar
- Industry: internet
- Products: Data centers, Colocation centre, Bare-metal servers, Cloud computing
- Revenue: US$13,800,000 (2012)
- Employees: 350
- Website: www.hostdime.com

HostDime Global Corp is an American data center infrastructure provider offering an array of cloud products including physical bare metal servers, virtualized cloud servers, and colocation services. HostDime's data centers are carrier-neutral facilities in global edge locations.

HostDime owns and operates infrastructure and networks in eight countries: the United States, Mexico, Brazil, United Kingdom, Netherlands, India, Colombia, and Hong Kong. Their flagship facility is in Orlando, Florida.

== History ==
HostDime Global Corp was founded by Manny Vivar and opened its first data center in downtown Orlando, Florida in December 2003 and moved its servers from a New Jersey Colocation facility. The company was bootstrapped and funded with under $50 by Vivar. HostDime's first international location was in João Pessoa, Brazil in 2006. Locations in Mexico, Colombia, and the United Kingdom opened in 2008, with India in 2010, and Netherlands and Hong Kong in 2012.

In November 2012, a report by Citizen Lab found that HostDime was among a handful of American companies selling hosting services to the Syrian government in direct opposition of an executive order from President Barack Obama. HostDime stated that the website in question, Syria's Ministry of Religious Affairs, was hosted by a customer who leased a server in their data center. Immediate steps were taken to sever ties from Syria and that matter was quickly resolved.

In 2013, HostDime built their first data center build of its own was a 10,000 square foot facility in Guadalajara, Mexico.

In 2016, HostDime purchased a 5-acre land parcel fronting I-4 in Orlando metro area, Town of Eatonville. The seven-story building would combine the data company's headquarters and its data center in one structure.

On July 14, 2017, HostDime officially opened their data center in João Pessoa, Brazil. The facility was only the second data center in northeast Brazil. The $15 million data center officially became Tier III Design Certified by the Uptime Institute in September 2020. It also became the first company in Brazil to receive the ISO 27701 certification.

In February 2020, HostDime went to work on another purpose-built data center, this time in Bogotá, Colombia. The facility is one of the largest data center construction investments in Colombia and one of the largest data centers in Latin America. The facility is expected to be commissioned for production in early 2021.

On March 18, 2026, a major outage occurred at HostDime's London facility after the withdrawal of the 212.18.224.0/20 address space at 16:50 UTC resulting in a rapid decline of upstream visibility with the final peering removed by 18:10 UTC. The outage was publicly acknowledged via HostDime's X account at 17:50 UTC. As of March 24, 2026 the outage is still ongoing and no further update has been made public. A customer of HostDime, VPSDime, has claimed the outage relates to a contract dispute with the data center.

== Present ==
HostDime operates one of the largest networks in the Central Florida region. In 2020, HostDime broke ground on the $35 million data center and corporate headquarters outside of Orlando metro area. Construction is due for completion in summer 2022. This will be Central Florida's largest data center.

As of 2021, HostDime is a privately held and self-funded company with no outside capital investors. Ownership of the company is privately held by the founder and key employees.

== Data Centers ==
HostDime operates in 10 edge data centers around the world.

Data center locations:

Americas: Orlando, Florida, Los Angeles, California, Guadalajara, Mexico, São Paulo, Brazil, João Pessoa, Brazil Bogotá, Colombia. Europe: London, United Kingdom, Rotterdam, Netherlands Asia-Pacific: New Delhi, India, Chai Wan, Hong Kong.
