= Seasons 52 =

American fresh grill and wine bar chain

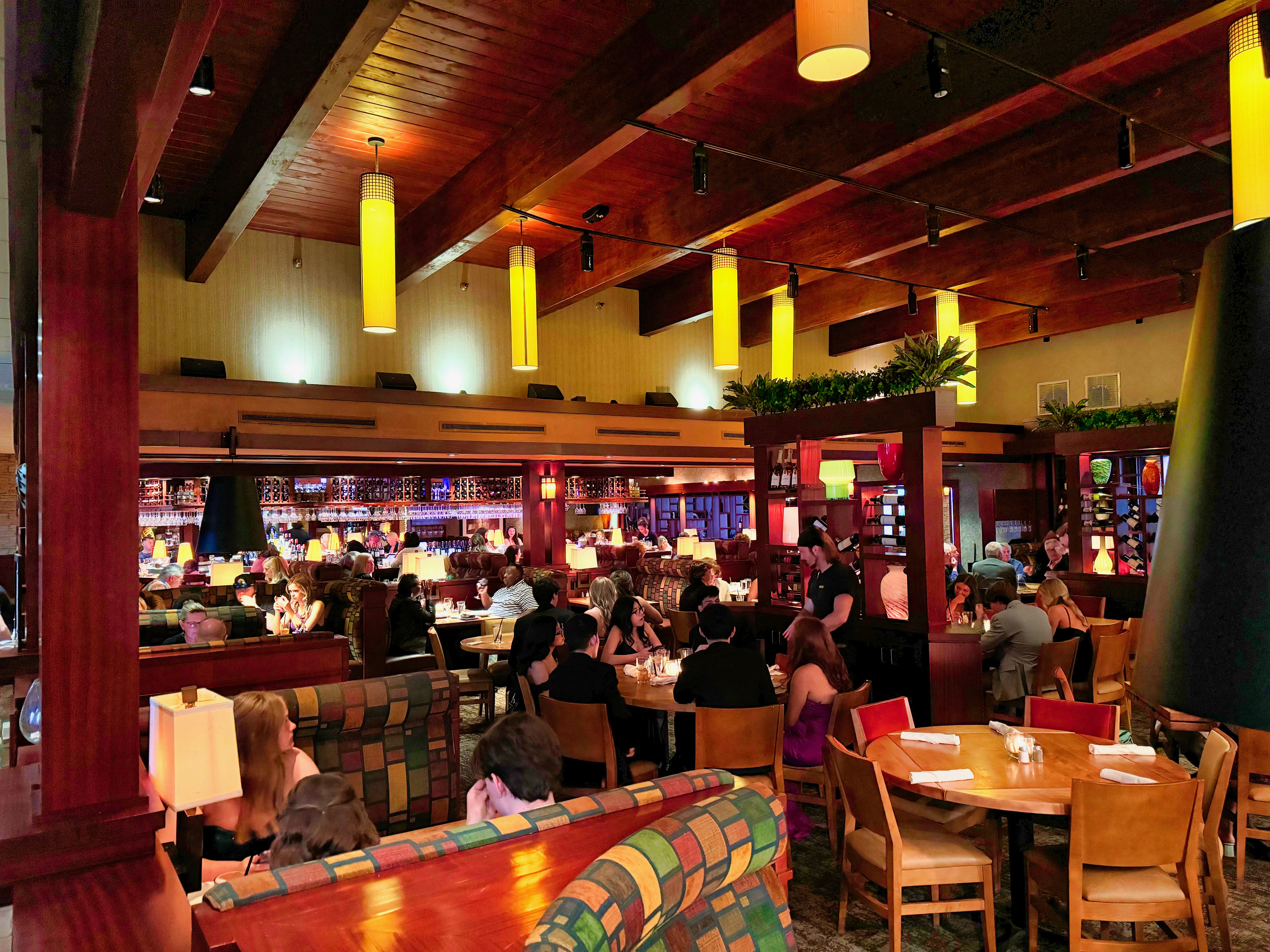
A Seasons 52 dining room

Seasons 52 is an American casual dining restaurant chain owned by Darden Restaurants. It was founded in 2003 in Orlando, Florida. The chain's concept is to deliver a casually sophisticated atmosphere, seasonal menu, fresh ingredients, and menu items that are naturally lighter. The chain had forty-four locations in the United States in 2023. The restaurant's core menu changes four times a year with each season.
