= LongHorn Steakhouse =

American restaurant chain

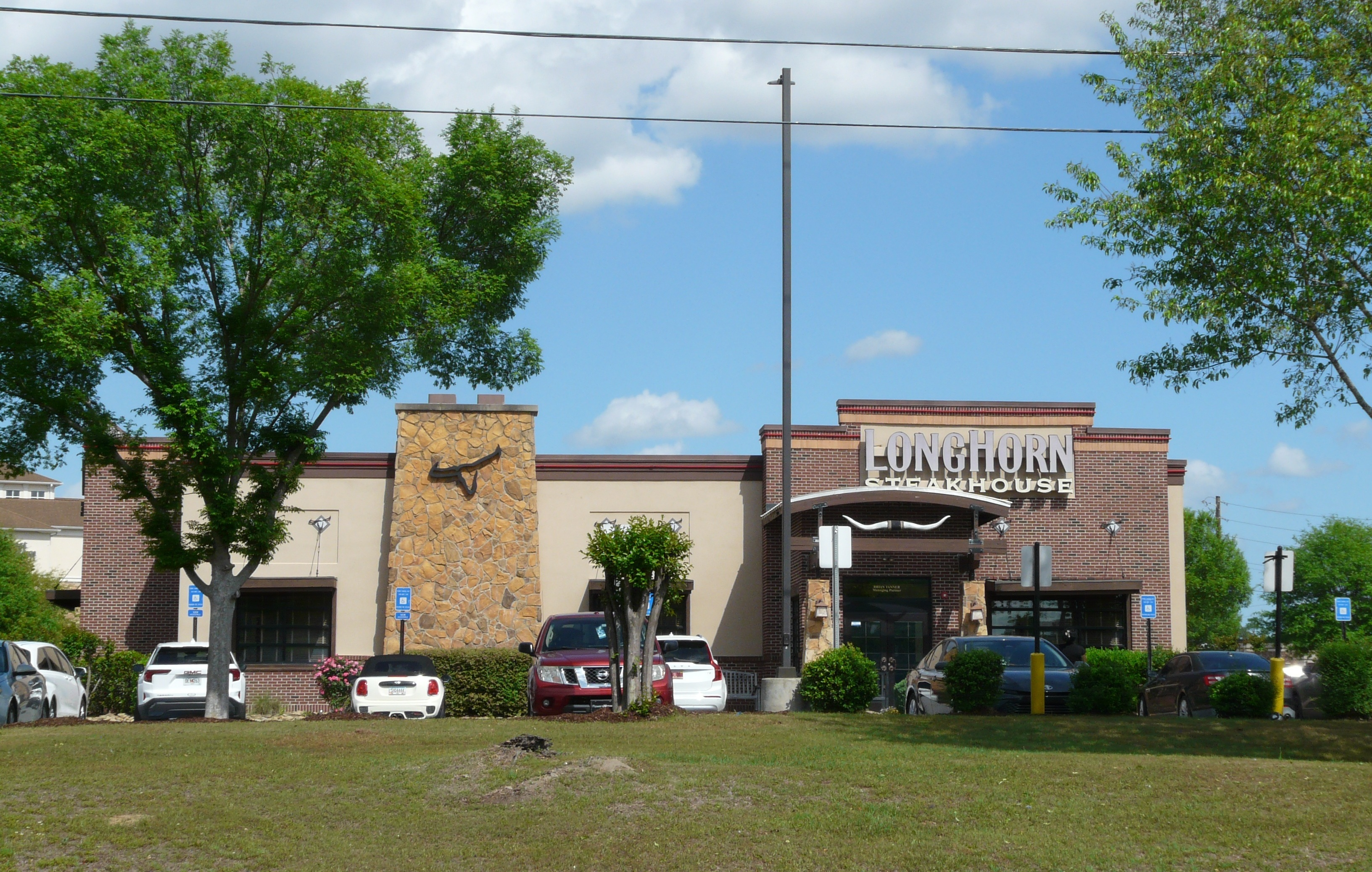
- location in Thomasville, Georgia
- Trade name: LongHorn Steakhouse
- Type: Division
- Industry: Restaurant
- Genre: Steak house
- Founded: August 10, 1981; 45 years ago in Atlanta, Georgia
- Founder: George McKerrow Jr.
- Headquarters: 1000 Darden Center Drive; Orlando, Florida, U.S. 32837
- Number of locations: 596 (May 2025)
- Area served: United States; Puerto Rico; Guam; Philippines
- Key people: Todd Burrowes (president); Rick Cardenas (CEO of Darden)
- Products: Steaks; chicken; burgers; salads
- Parent: Darden Restaurants (2007–present)
- Website: longhornsteakhouse.com

RARE Hospitality Management, LLC. doing business as LongHorn Steakhouse, is an American casual dining restaurant chain owned and operated by Darden Restaurants, headquartered in Orlando, Florida. As of May 2025, LongHorn Steakhouse operates 596 locations across the United States and select territories.

== History ==
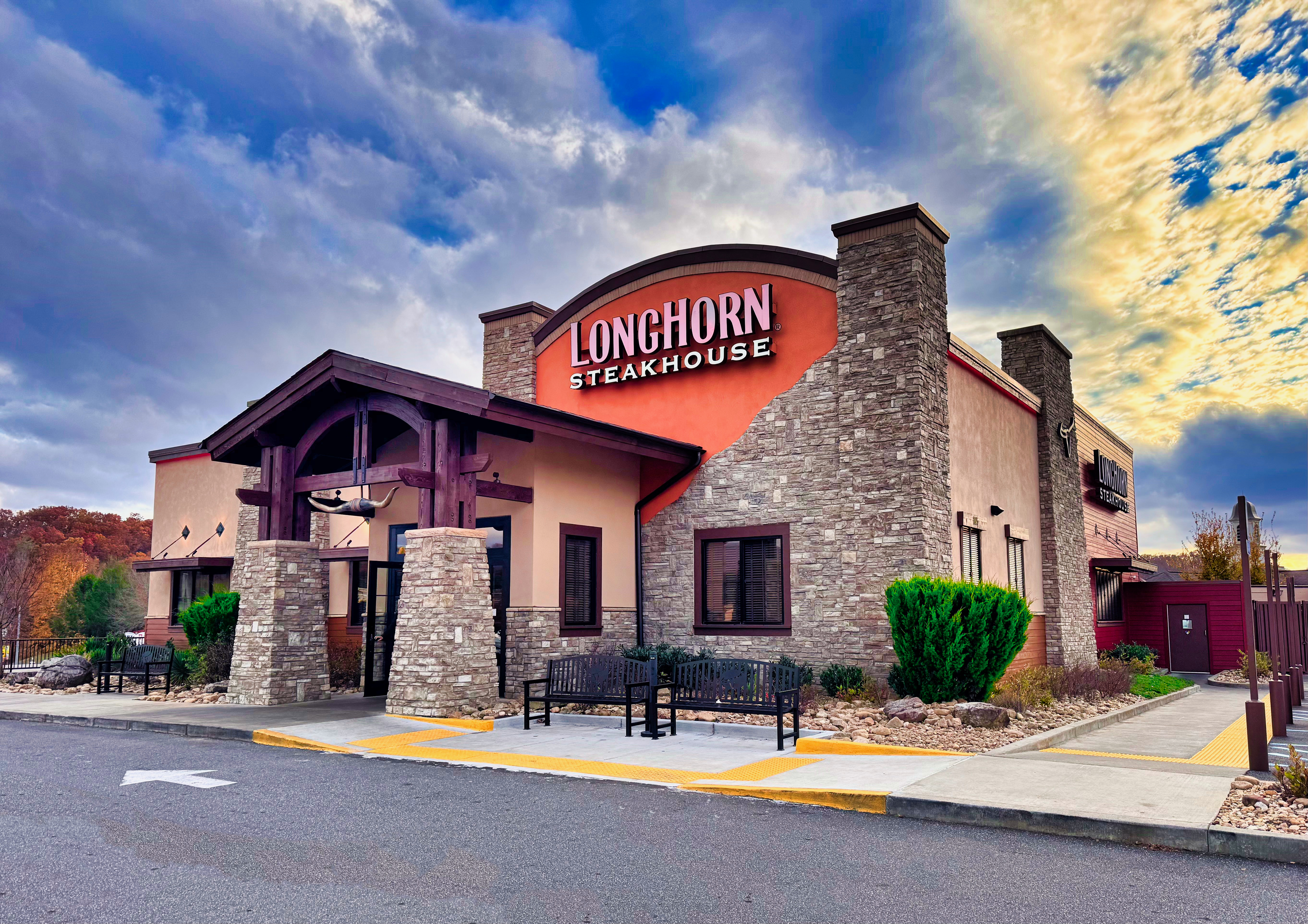
A LongHorn Steakhouse in Blairsville, Georgia

LongHorn Steakhouse was founded in 1981 by George McKerrow Jr. and his father George Sr., Bill Norman, and Bill Dukes. Before starting the chain, McKerrow worked as a manager at Quinn's Mill Restaurant, which was part of Victoria Station—a San Francisco-based dining concept known for using refurbished railroad cars as dining areas. Victoria Station was popular across the United States during the 1970s and 1980s.

The first location, originally called LongHorn Steaks Restaurant & Saloon, opened on Peachtree Street in Atlanta on August 10, 1981. It was a former antique store and later an adult entertainment business.

It was located across from Harrison's, a popular pub on Peachtree frequented by Atlanta Journal and Constitution columnist Ron Hudspeth. Because Harrison's had a limited bar menu, patrons often visited LongHorn for steaks. In January 1982, a snowstorm known as Snow Jam 82 stranded commuters in metro Atlanta. LongHorn offered $1 drinks and menu specials to affected motorists, an action publicized by Hudspeth in his column, which helped improve the restaurant's performance.

LongHorn Steakhouse at Shangri-La Plaza in the Philippines.

By 1990, the franchise expanded farther south. It had restaurants throughout the Eastern United States in addition to many locations in the Midwest, Southwest, and Puerto Rico. In August 2007, LongHorn Steakhouse, formerly owned and operated by RARE Hospitality International Inc., was purchased by Darden Restaurants, Inc. On April 11, 2025, their first international location was opened in the Philippines.

== Theme ==
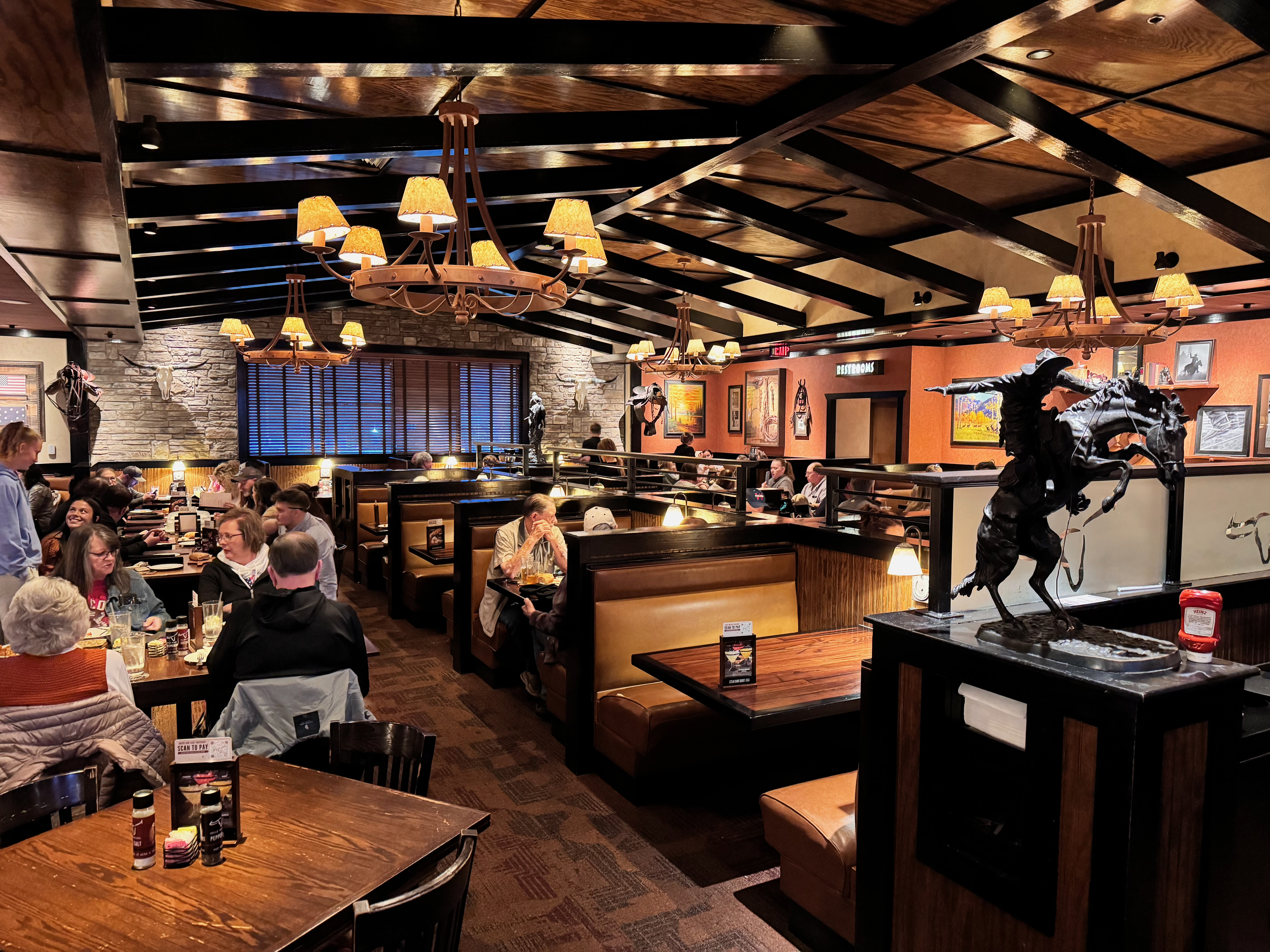
Interior of a typical LongHorn Steakhouse location

LongHorn Steakhouse has a Western/Texan theme. Each restaurant is decorated with oil paintings, photos, and selected Western memorabilia that support this theme.

== Menu ==
The restaurant is best known for its variety of steak, including its "Flo's Filet". In addition to steak, the menu features ribs, chicken, salmon, lobster, shrimp, and salads. Appetizers include their "Texas Tonion" and "Wild West Shrimp," alongside a selection of side dishes. LongHorn Steakhouse offers a full bar with draft and bottled beer, wine, and several signature margaritas. A lunch menu is available, featuring soups, salads, sandwiches, and hamburgers. They offer parmesan crusts for a variety of their dishes.

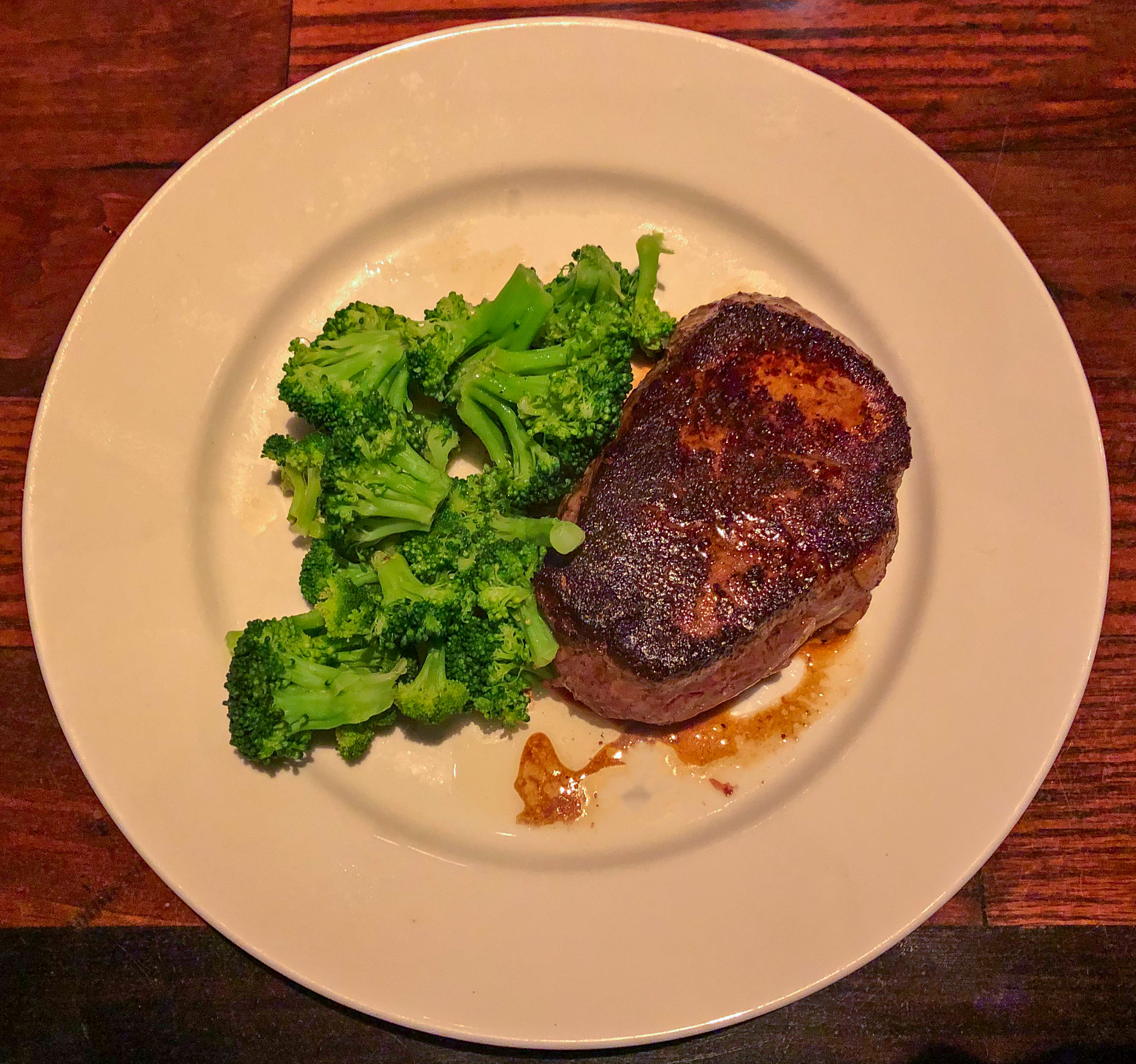
Flo's Filet, a center cut filet

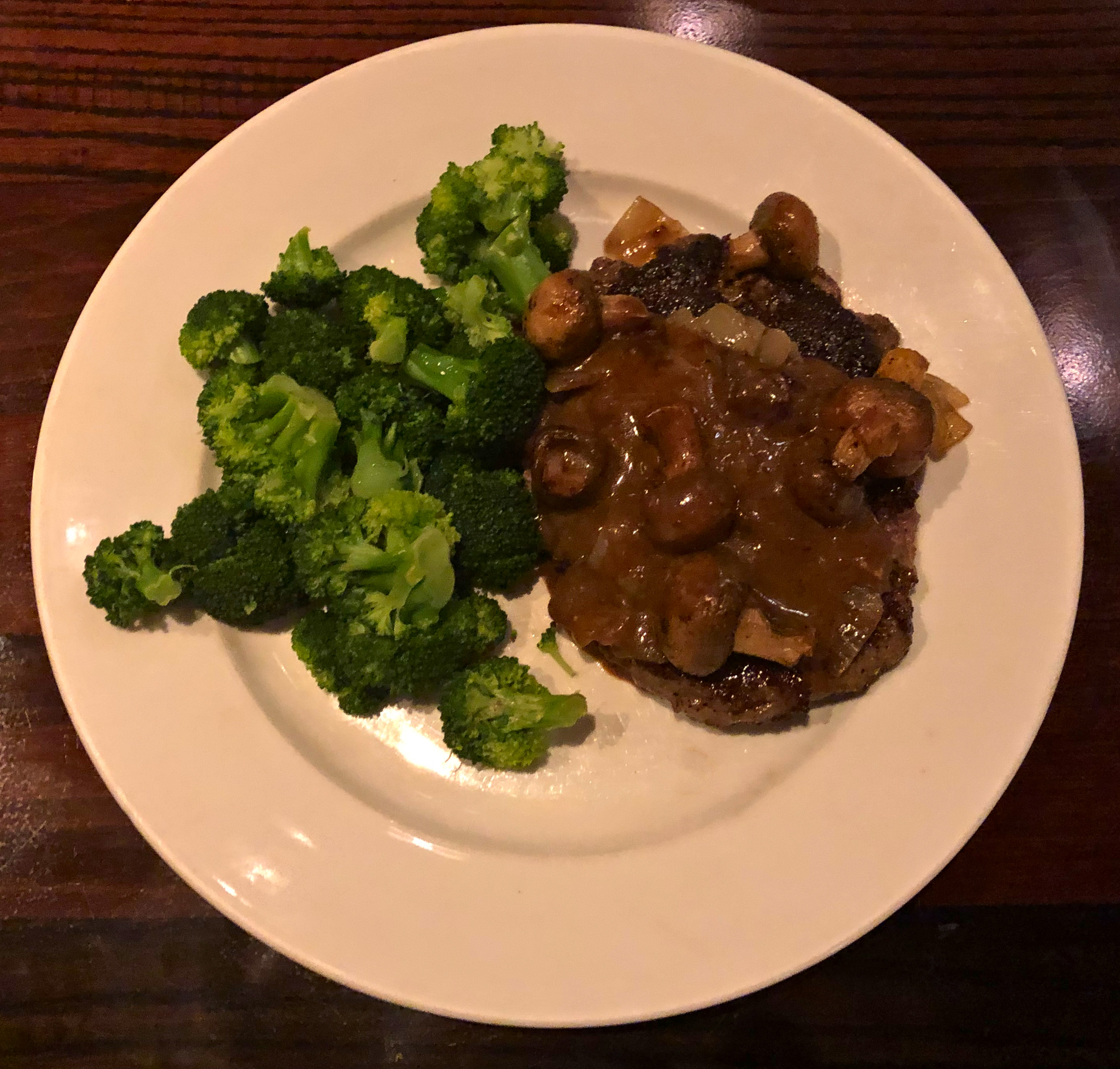
Chopped steak (ground beef)

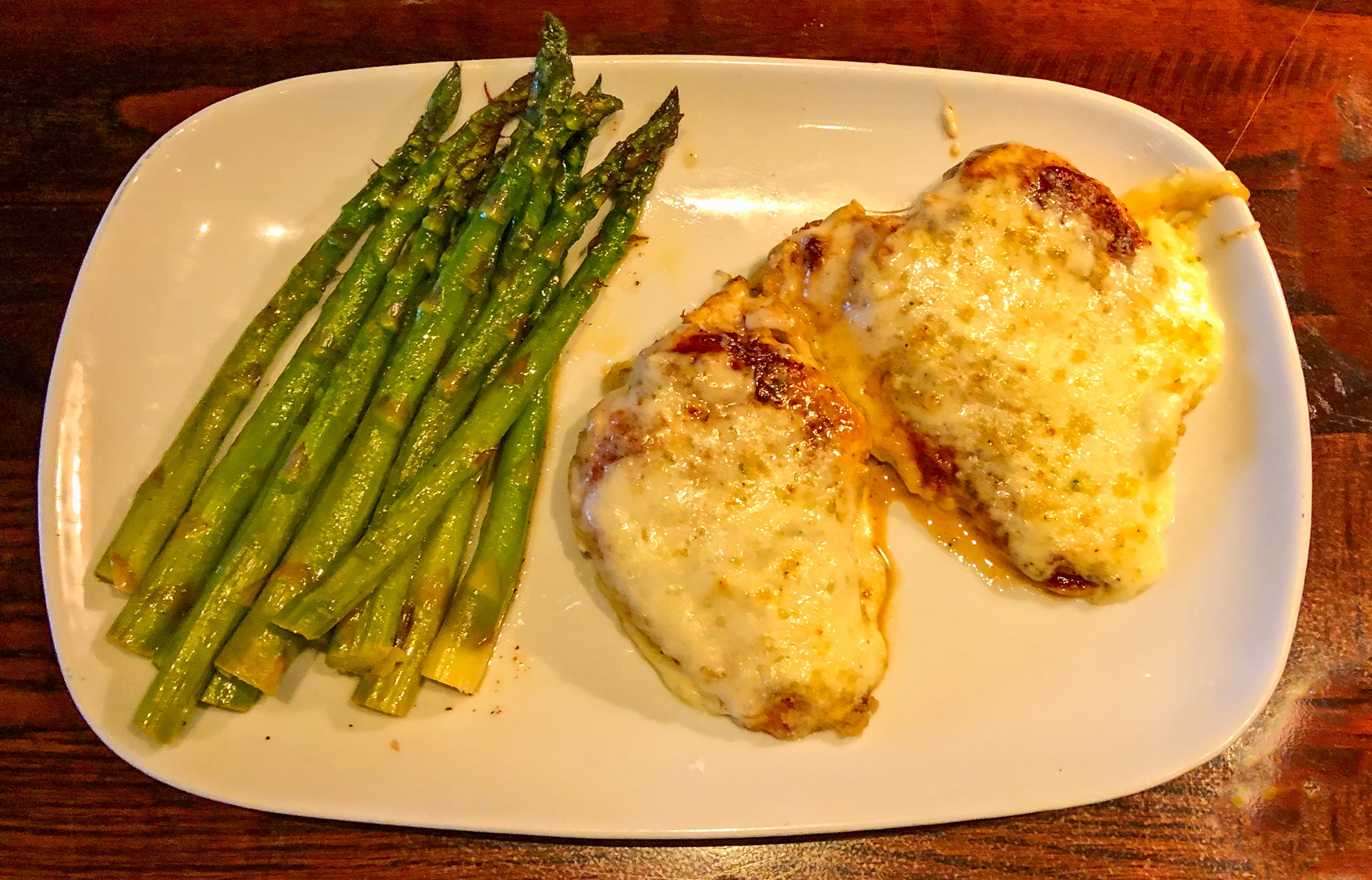
Longhorn Chicken with a parmesan crust

=== Doneness preference ===
According to research conducted between May 2016 and May 2017, 37.5% of diners preferred their steak done medium, 25.8% medium well, 22.5% medium rare, and 11.7% well done. Only 2.5% preferred their steak to be rare.
