= Companies listed on the New York Stock Exchange (D) =

== D ==
Stock name	Symbol	Country of origin
D. R. Horton	DHI	US
Dun & Bradstreet	DNB	US
Dana Holding Corporation	DAN	US
Danaher Corporation	DHR	US
Danaos Corporation	DAC	Greece
DAQO New Energy Corp.	DQ	Cayman Islands
Darden Restaurants	DRI	US
Darling Ingredients Inc.	DAR	US
DaVita Inc.	DVA	US
DCP Midstream Partners	DPM	US
Deckers Outdoor Corporation	DECK	US
John Deere	DE	US
Delek Logistics Partners, LP	DKL	US
Delek	DK	US
Delphi Automotive	DLPH	US
Delta Air Lines	DAL	US
Deltic Timber Corporation	DEL	US
Deluxe Corporation	DLX	US
Demand Media	DMD	US
Demandware	DWRE	US
The Denali Fund Inc.	DNY	US
Deutsche Bank	DB	Germany
Devon Energy	DVN	US
DeVry Education Group	DV	US
DHT Holdings, Inc.	DHT	Marshall Islands
Diageo	DEO	United Kingdom
Diamond Offshore Drilling	DO	US
Diamond Resorts International	DRII	US
DiamondRock Hospitality Company	DRH	US
Diana Shipping, Inc.	DSX	Greece
Dice.com	DHX	US
Dick's Sporting Goods	DKS	US
Diebold	DBD	US
Digital Realty	DLR	US
Dillard's	DDS	US
DineEquity	DIN	US
DNOW Inc.	DNOW	US
Dolby Laboratories	DLB	US
Dollar General	DG	US
Dominion Resources	D	US
Domtar	UFS	Canada
Donaldson Company	DCI	US
Doral Financial Corporation	DRL	Puerto Rico
Dorian LPG Ltd.	LPG	Marshall Islands
Douglas Dynamics, Inc.	PLOW	US
Douglas Emmett, Inc.	DEI	US
Dover Corporation	DOV	US
Dover Downs	DDE	US
Dover Motorsports Incorporated	DVD	US
Dow Chemical Company	DOW	US
Dr Pepper Snapple Group	DPS	US
Dr. Reddy's Laboratories	RDY	India
DRDGOLD Limited	DRD	South Africa
Dresser-Rand Group	DRC	US
Drew Industries Incorporated	DW	US
Dril-Quip, Inc.	DRQ	US
DST Systems Inc.	DST	US
DSW, Inc.	DSW	US
DTE Energy	DTE	US
Ducommun	DCO	US
Duff & Phelps	DUC	US
Duke Energy	DUK	US
DuPont Fabros Technology	DFT	US
Dycom Industries	DY	US
Dynegy	DYN	US
Dynex Capital Inc.	DX	US
