= ABC Fine Wine & Spirits =

Alcohol retailer in Florida, United States

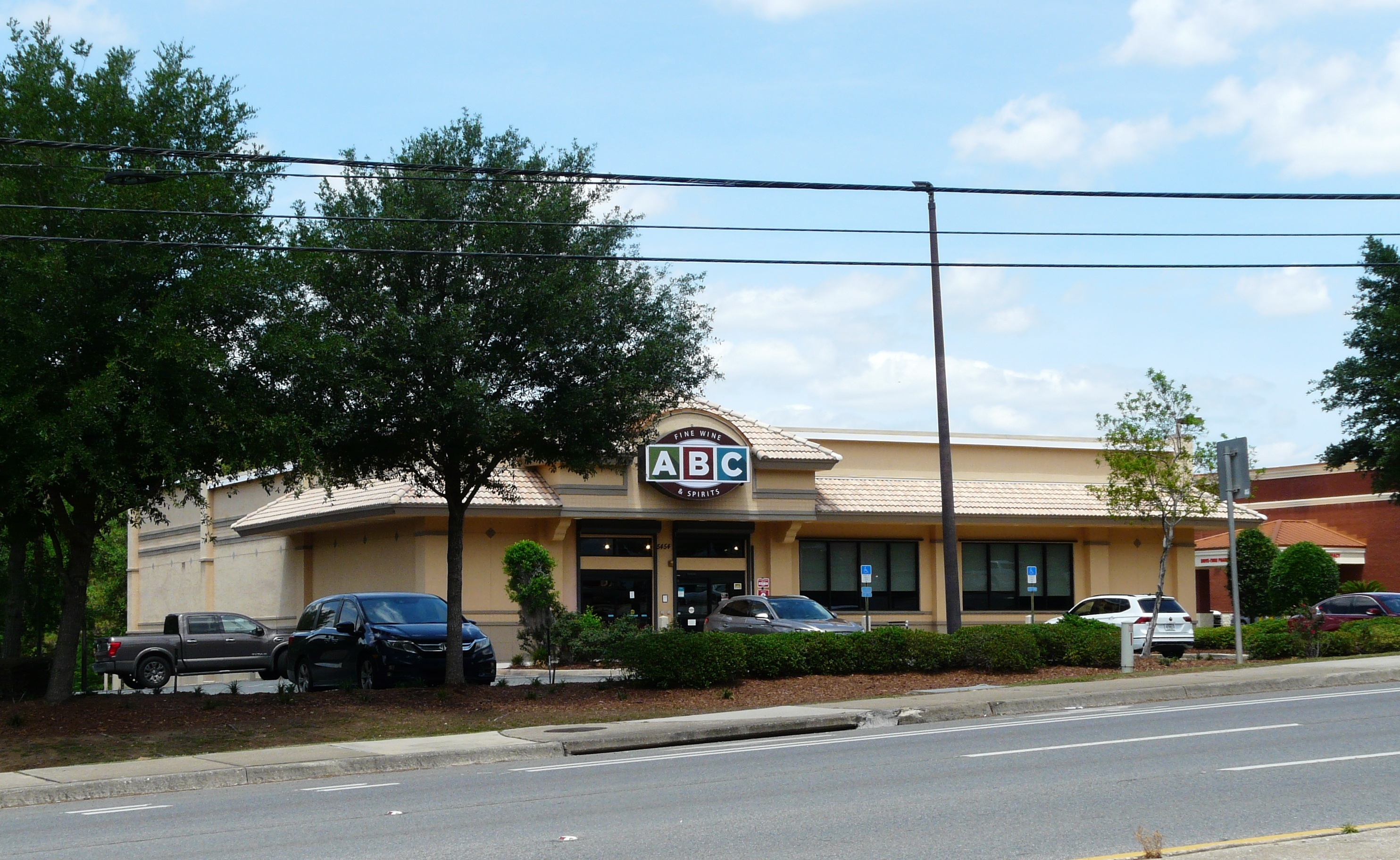
- ABC store in Tallahassee, Florida
- Formerly: Jack's Friendly Neighborhood Bar, ABC Liquors
- Type: Private
- Industry: Retail
- Founded: 1936
- Founder: Jack Holloway
- Headquarters: Orlando, Florida, United States
- Number of locations: 123 (2021)
- Key people: Charles Bailes III (CEO)
- Products: Wine, spirits, beer, cigars, gourmet food, accessories
- Revenue: ▲$700 million (2019)
- Number of employees: 1,200 (2021)
- Website: www.abcfws.com

ABC Fine Wine & Spirits is an American retail chain that specializes in wine, spirits, beer, cigars, gourmet food, and accessories. The company is based in Orlando, Florida, and was founded in 1936 by Jack Holloway. It is owned by the Bailes family, and Charles Bailes III is its CEO. Despite the name, the company has no relation to the state-run Alcoholic Beverage Control or Alcoholic Beverage Commission stores (both of which are commonly known as ABC stores) found in several U.S. states.

== History ==
Jack Holloway, a Georgia native who moved to Florida in 1931, was working as a manager at a United Cigar store when Prohibition ended in 1933. Seeing an opportunity in the newly legalized liquor trade, he proposed selling alcohol to his employer, who declined. Holloway then borrowed money from a relative and opened Jack's Friendly Neighborhood Bar at the corner of North Orange Avenue and Wall Street in downtown Orlando in 1936. The location was strategic, as it was near a bus stop for Pinecastle Air Force Base (now Orlando International Airport), attracting servicemen.

In 1950, Holloway renamed the business ABC Liquors, reportedly to ensure it appeared first in the phone book and to create a memorable, trustworthy brand. The name later evolved to ABC Fine Wine & Spirits to reflect a more modern retail focus. Holloway was skilled at numbers and sales and he found a planner and builder in Charles Bailes Jr., who married Holloway's daughter, Jackie, and left Cone Bros. Construction, one of the companies that helped build Florida's Turnpike, to join ABC. The company grew slowly, reaching about six stores by the mid-1940s. Holloway, known for his frugality and business acumen, reinvested profits into acquiring more bars and package stores. Many early stores included attached lounges, ranging from dive bars to country music dance bars and discos. Holloway's daughter, Jackie, married Charles Bailes Jr., who joined the company after working at Cone Bros. Construction. Bailes Jr. helped professionalize operations, and the company built a new headquarters and warehouse in 1975 in south Orlando, where it remains. Holloway's grandsons, Charles Bailes III (current Chairman and CEO) and Jess Bailes (Executive Vice President), took leadership roles in 1994, continuing the family-owned tradition.

By the late 1980s, ABC expanded beyond Central Florida with the acquisition of Jax Liquors, growing its footprint across the state. As of recent data, ABC operates 123–125 stores from the Florida Panhandle to Miami, with several more under construction, making it Florida's largest independent alcohol retailer. In the 1980s and 1990s, under Charles Bailes III, ABC phased out its lounges and closed stores in less desirable locations, reducing from approximately 200 to 140 stores. The company remodeled remaining stores to create a more inviting, modern retail experience, moving away from barred windows and a “porn shop” vibe to open, well-lit stores with Spanish roof tiles. This shift was partly driven by the realization that women accounted for nearly two-thirds of alcohol sales. In the 1980s, the company was split between the Holloway-Bailes family and has remained under their ownership ever since.

Under their leadership, ABC has continued to expand retail operations and product offerings, as well as charitable and community initiatives.
