= Adamolekun =

Adamolekun is a Yoruba surname. Notable people with the surname include:

- Ladipo Adamolekun, public administration scholar
- Nathaniel Adamolekun, Jamaican footballer
- Olufolasade Adamolekun, Jamaican footballer
- Yemi Adamolekun, executive director of Enough is Enough
- Damola Adamolekun, CEO of Red Lobster
