= Khanyisile =

Khanyisile is a feminine given name, derived from the Nguni word khanya, meaning "light." Notable people with the name include:

- Khanyisile Mbau (born 1985), South African actress
- Khanyisile Motsa, South African humanitarian
- Khanyisile Litchfield-Tshabalala, South African navy admiral
