= Khanyisa =

Khanyisa may refer to:

- Khanyisa Mayo, South African soccer player
- Khanyisa Chawane, South African netball player
- Khanyisile Litchfield-Tshabalala, former South African navy admiral
- Khanyisile Motsa, South African humanitarian
