= Pashtana Durrani =

Afghani teacher (born 1997)

- Born: 1997 (age 28–29); Pakistan
- Education: American University of Afghanistan, Harvard University
- Occupations: Feminist, activist, and educator
- Organization: Founder of learnafghan.org
- Title: International Scholar in Residence at the Wellesley Centers for Women
- Awards: BBC 100 Women
- Website: pashtanadurrani.com

Pashtana Durrani (born 1997) is an Afghan feminist, activist, and educator. She is the founder of LEARN Afghanistan, the country’s first digital school network, dedicated to providing education to Afghan children and women, particularly focusing on girls’ education and women’s rights.

== Early life and education ==
Pashtana Durrani was born in 1997 in a refugee camp near Quetta, Pakistan. Growing up as refugees, Durrani’s family deeply valued education, adopting the motto: “You can go hungry, but not without a day of learning.”

In 2001, her father, a tribal leader, established a girls’ school in the refugee camp, where her mother and aunt taught. This initiative provided education to local girls despite cultural and logistical barriers, instilling in Durrani a lifelong commitment to education.

In 2016, after completing high school, Durrani moved to Afghanistan. Following her father’s death when she was 21, she assumed leadership of her family and was elected as khan by her tribe, a role she held until her younger brother came of age.

== Founding of LEARN Afghan ==
In 2018, Durrani founded LEARN Afgan, an NGO that provides education to Afghan children and women through digital platforms. At the time of the Taliban takeover of Afghanistan in 2021, LEARN operated 18 digital schools across southern Afghanistan, educating over 10,000 students and training more than 80 teachers in digital literacy.

The organization also prioritizes girls’ health, training 700 girls in menstrual hygiene management.

Following the fall of Kabul in August 2021, Durrani went into hiding. LEARN Afghanistan resumed operations, although covertly, within a month of the takeover.

After Taliban’s resurgence in 2021, LEARN transitioned to operating underground schools in five provinces, continuing to educate hundreds of girls daily despite significant risks. By 2024, this network expanded to include six provinces, with underground schools in Kandahar, Helmand, Daikundi, Samangan, Herat, and Bamyan. As of November 2026, LEARN reports that 5,170 students learn through 25 community-based schools across 24 provinces.

At the time of the Taliban takeover, Durrani was studying political science at the American University of Afghanistan. Forced into exile in October 2021, she relocated to the United States. In November 2021, she became a visiting fellow at the Wellesley College, where she focused on how to improve the distribution of humanitarian aid and mitigate financial corruption. In 2023, her role transitioned to that of International Scholar in Residence, continuing her work on supporting Afghan women and girls through education and maternal health initiatives.

== Activism ==
Durrani’s activism is deeply influenced by her upbringing and personal experiences as a refugee and educator. She emphasizes the transformative power of education in dismantling systemic barriers and empowering communities. Despite being forced into exile, she continues to advocate for Afghan girls’ education from abroad, frequently providing commentary on platforms like BBC, CNN, and PBS.

== Academic and professional work ==
Durrani is an international scholar in residence at the Wellesley Centers for Women, focusing on female education and maternal health. She holds a Master of Education in Education Policy Analysis from Harvard University. Harvard University.

== Awards and recognition ==
- 2017–2019 Global Youth Representative, Amnesty International.
- 2020 Malala Fund Education Champion
- 2021 Tällberg-SNF-Eliasson Emerging Leader Prize
- 2021 BBC 100 Women
- 2022 UN Young Activists Award
- 2023 CEU Open Society Prize
- 2023 Global Citizen Prize for Human Rights
- 2023 Muhammad Ali Humanitarian Award
- 2024 Women’s Excellence Award, World Economic Forum.
- 2024 Daughter of Greatness, Muhammad Ali Center
- 2024 Great Group Reads selection, Women's National Book Association, for Last to Eat, Last to Learn
- 2025 30 Under 30, International Literacy Association
- 2025 Ginetta Sagan Award, Amnesty International USA

== Memoir ==
Durrani’s memoir, Last to Eat, Last to Learn (2022, Kensington), chronicles her journey from refugee to activist and her work with LEARN Afghanistan.
