= Wawira Njiru =

Kenyan entrepreneur, nutritionist, and philanthropist

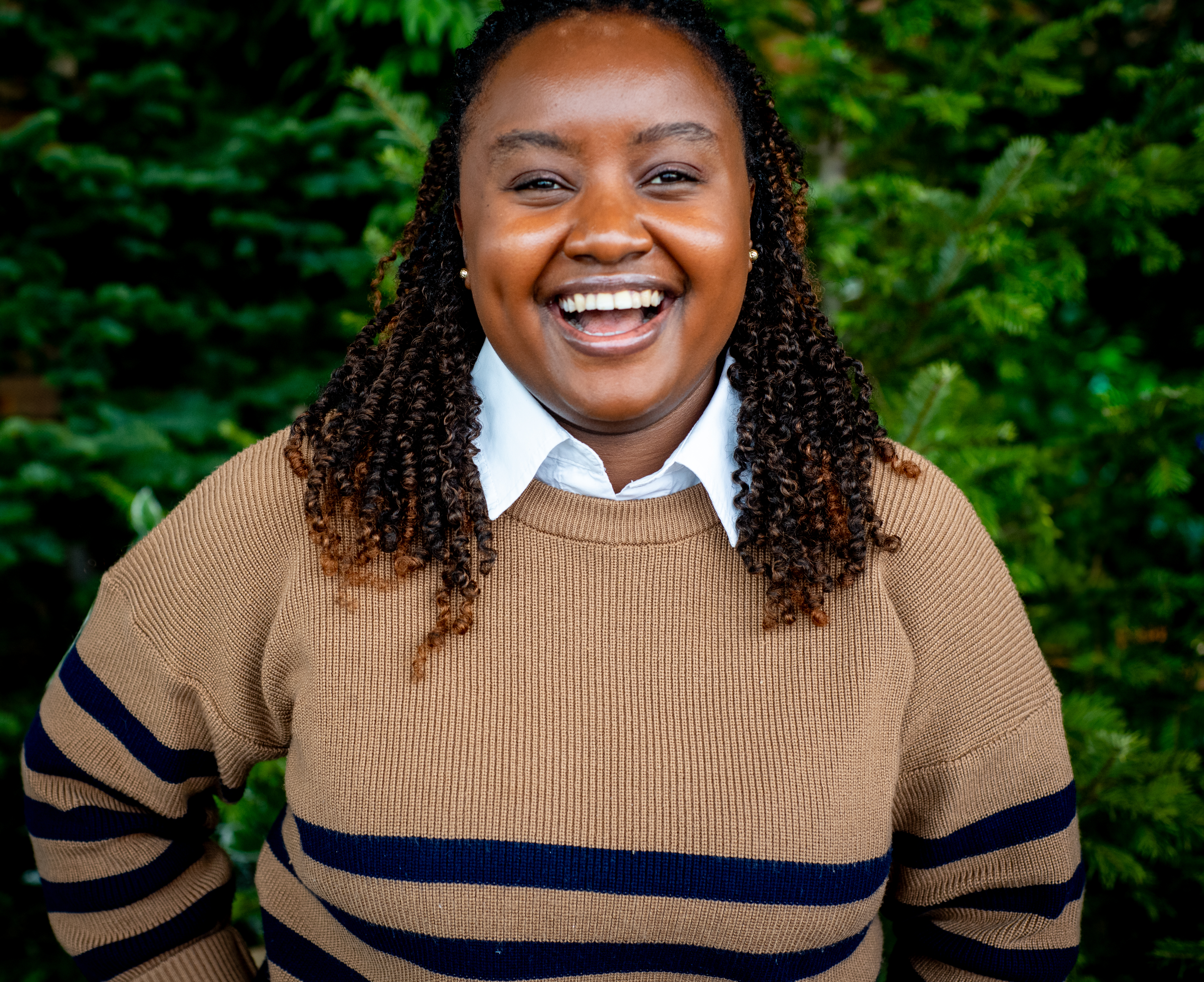
- Wawira Njiru at TED 2025
- Born: January 27, 1991 (age 35)
- Citizenship: Kenya
- Education: University of South Australia (Bachelor of Nutrition Science)
- Occupations: Nutritionist, social entrepreneur and philanthropist
- Years active: 2012–present
- Title: Founder and CEO of Food for Education

Wawìra Njirū is a Kenyan social entrepreneur, nutritionist, and philanthropist. She is the CEO of Food for Education, an organization that serves a hot, nutritious and affordable school meal to over 500,000 public primary school children in the urban and peri-urban areas of Kenya.

== Early life and education ==
Njirū grew up in the town of Rūirū, in Kiambu County, northwest of the capital city of Nairobi. She attended local schools for her primary and secondary education. In 2010, she was admitted to the University of South Australia, in Adelaide, where she graduated with a Bachelor of Nutrition Science degree.

== Career ==
In 2012, while pursuing her undergraduate degree at the University of South Australia, Njirū hosted a Kenyan-themed fundraising dinner where she invited 80 guests, charged them $20 per plate and raised the equivalent of Ksh. 126,000.

With these funds, Food for Education was founded. Njirū set up a makeshift kitchen in Rūirū Primary School whose outreach was to an initial 25 children. This was followed by several internet fundraising campaigns. Over time, the number of children in the program increased.

According to Njirū, it costs Ksh30 (approx. US$0.30) to provide a meal to a primary-going school child in Kenya. The parents or guardians are asked to contribute KSh15 (approx. US$0.15). Food for Education and subsidies from government cover the remaining cost.

The organization uses a hub-and-spoke system whereby meals are prepared in central kitchens (hub) and distributed through systematized logistics to schools (spoke). Their technology-centered approach allows parents to pay $0.15/meal via mobile money and primary school students with their NFC smartwatches connected to a virtual wallet allows them to 'tap to eat' in under 5 seconds.

== Awards and recognition ==
In 2018, Business Daily Africa, a Kenyan daily newspaper, named Njirū one of the "Top 40 Under 40 Kenyan Women" for the year 2018. In December 2018, she became the first person to win the Global Citizen Prize for Youth Leadership. In 2018, she was named among the "100 Most Influential Young Kenyans" by Avance Media. In October 2021, Njirū was recognized as the UN Person of the Year.

In 2024, Njirū received the Skoll Award for Social Innovation, from the Skoll Foundation, in an event held in Oxford, England. She was awarded alongside three other organizations. Later that year, she received an Icon Award for "The World's 50 Best Restaurants", for her contributions in the food industry. She was also an awardee of the 2024 Elevate Prize by the Elevate Prize Foundation.

Her organization, Food for Education, was awarded the University of Pennsylvania Barry and Marie Lipman Family Prize in 2024.

In 2025, Njirū was recognized by CNBC as a "Changemaker".
