= Priya Prakash =

Indian businesswoman

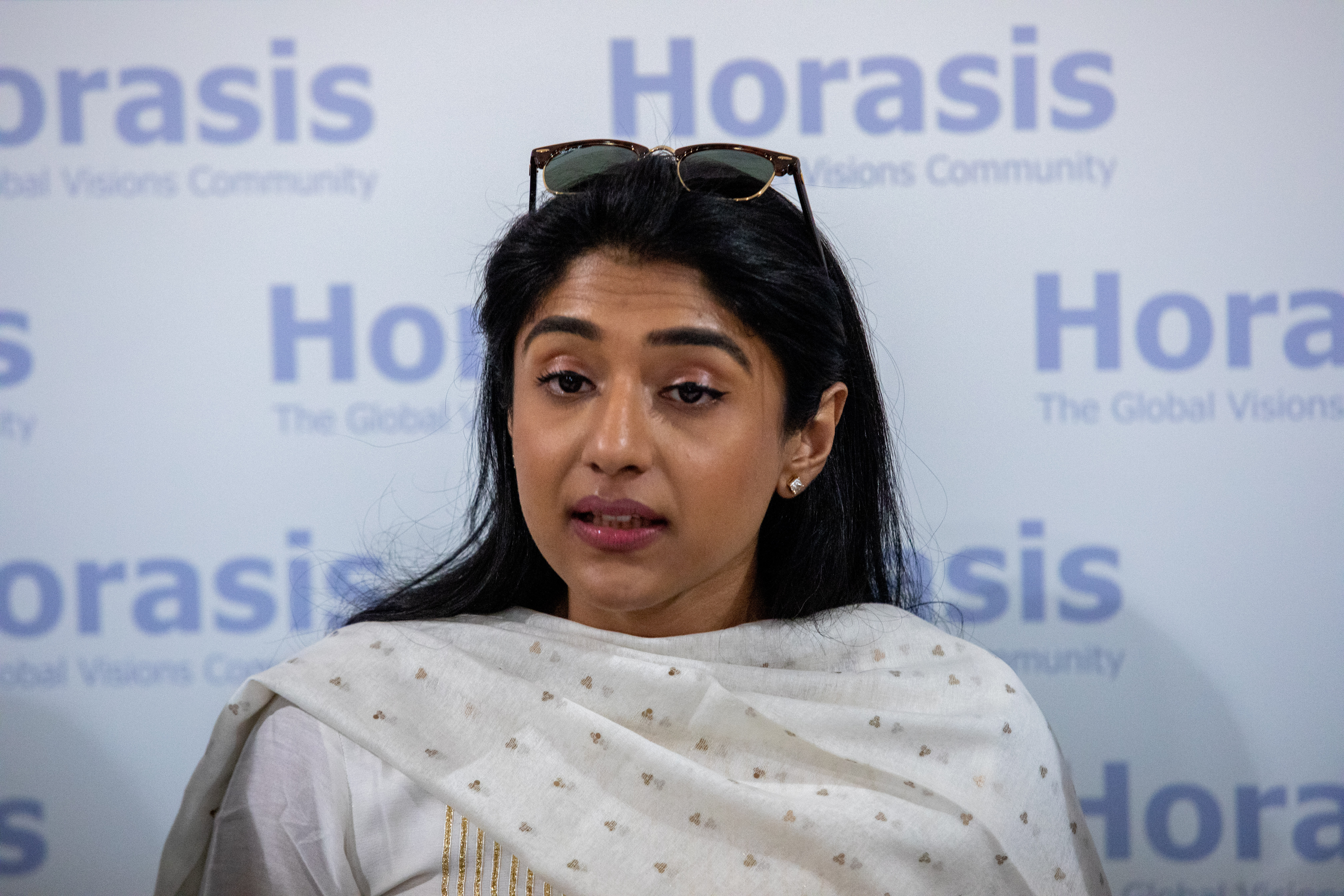
- Prakash in 2018
- Born: 1990 (age 35–36) (Note: In 2018, Prakash was reported to be 28); Gurgaon, India
- Education: Rishi Valley School; Lady Shri Ram College for Women
- Known for: CEO of HealthSetGo

Priya Prakash (born 1990) is an Indian businesswoman and executive. She is the founder and CEO of HealthSetGo.

== Early life and education ==
Prakash was educated at the Rishi Valley School and Lady Shri Ram College for Women. Growing up, she was bullied for being overweight which caused her to develop an eating disorder in college. This inspired her to join a gym in 2012, where she met a fitness coach who encouraged her to have a healthier relationship with her food.

Prakash was awarded in Forbes' Under 30 Asia 2018 in Healthcare and Sciences and honoured with the Unilever Young Entrepreneur of the Year in 2018. She also won the Global Citizen Prize 2019.

Apart from work she is a Delhi State Level Weightlifter, Tedx Speaker, Crossfit L1 Trainer, and health blogger.

== Career ==
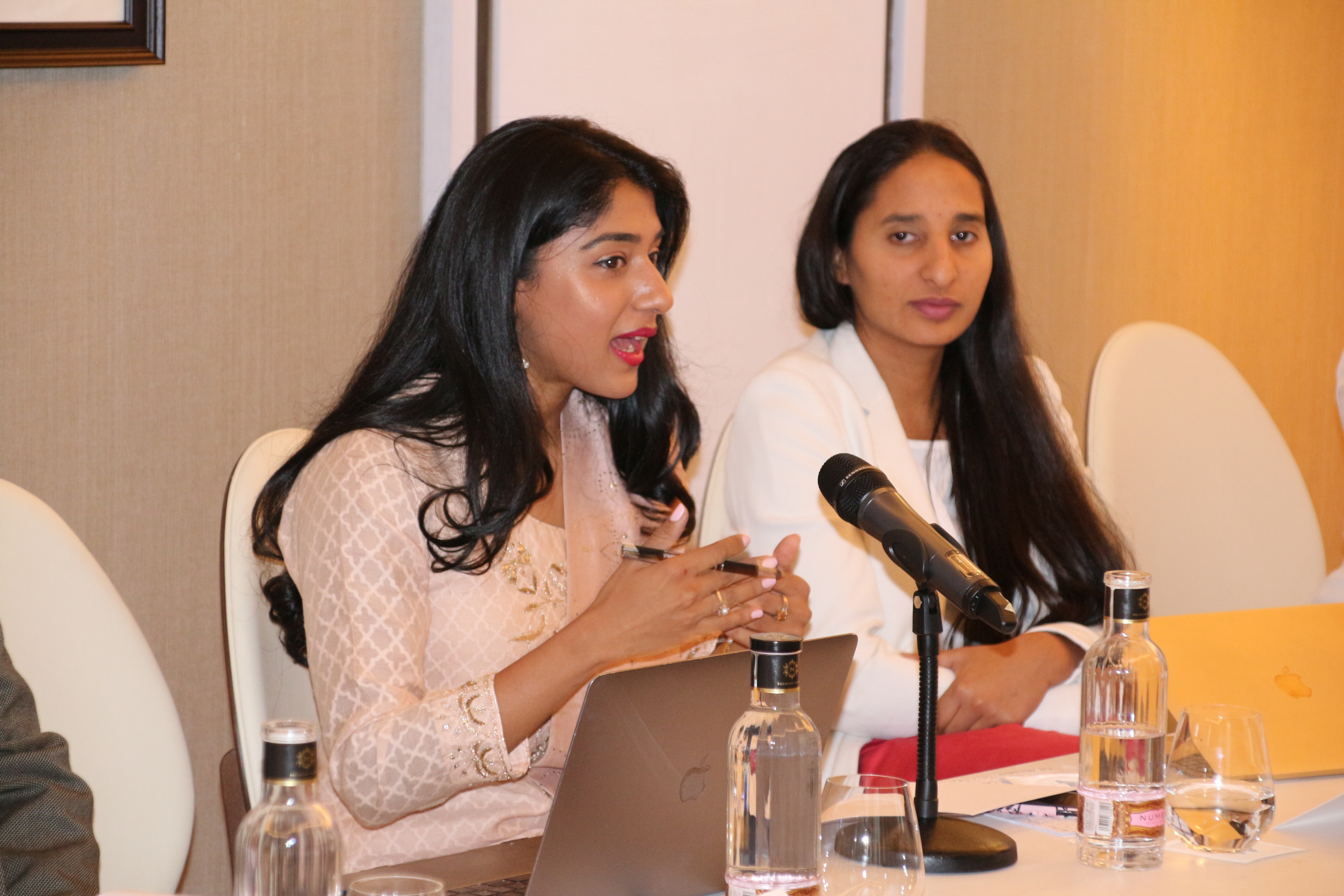

After graduating, Prakash began a career in finance. By 2014, Prakash founded HealthSetGo, which aimed to encourage healthy behaviour in children around India. Three years later, HealthSetGo was partnered with 16 hospitals, 90 doctors and 35 clinics across India.

In 2018, Prakash was named to Forbes 30 Under 30 Asia List due to the expansion of HealthSetGo. Her organization had grown to train more than 300 doctors and teachers across 70 cities to encourage healthy eating, which was estimated to have impacted more than 80,000 students. One of the implementations HealthSetGo added to schools was by conducting a health assessment during school to monitor children's health and development. This also meant that early signs of disease were caught quickly and dealt with. At the end of the medical exams, the schools were then given advice on how to improve and assess future health related issues. She also helped organize an annual HealthSetGo Run to commemorate World Health Day. The following year, she was a finalist for the Cartier Women's Initiative Awards. Later in December, she won the Cisco Youth Leadership Prize, which included a $250,000 grant towards HealthSetGo.
