= Ineza Umuhoza Grace =

Eco-feminist

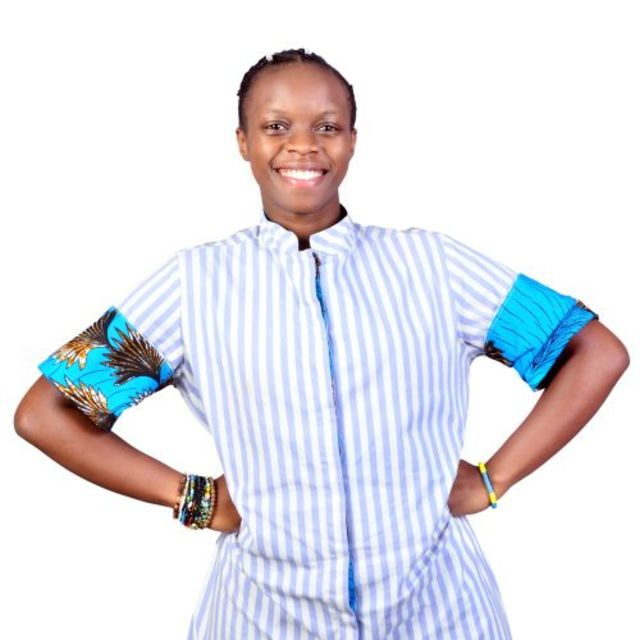
- Ineza's photo for her National Geographic Explorer profile.
- Born: 1996 (age 29–30); Kigali, Rwanda
- Education: University of Rwanda
- Occupations: Eco-feminist, climate activist, environmentalist
- Notable work: The Green Protector
- Awards: Young Explorer 2020, Dragon's Den: Community-Based Adaptation 2020, Top 100 Young African Conservation Leaders 2021, Global Citizen 2023
- Website: https://www.thegreenprotector.org/

Ineza Umuhoza Grace (born 1996) is an eco-feminist, climate activist and environmentalist from Kigali, Rwanda. She is the CEO of The Green Protector, co-ordinator of the Loss and Damage Youth Coalition and Research Assistant for the CCLAD project. She was a Global Citizen Prize winner in 2023.

== Early life and education ==
Grace was born and raised in Kigali, Rwanda. A storm flooded her house at the age of 5, and CNET reported on her as someone with personal experience of loss and damage; natural disasters such as floods are becoming a frequent occurrence in Rwanda. Grace produced an animated film—assisted by a grant from the National Geographic Society—to educate young people on climate change issues.

Grace graduated with a Bachelor's Degree in Water & Environmental Engineering in 2018 from the University of Rwanda. After graduating, she studied climate change diplomacy with United Nations Institute for Training and Research (UNITAR) and Business Management with the African Women Enterprise Cooperation.

== Career ==
Grace became interested in land neutrality activities, such as the conservation of the Congo Basin, during her time at the Youth Delegation at United Nations Convention to Combat Desertification (UNCCD), and as a MILEAD (Moremi Initiative Leadership Empowerment and Development) fellow, in 2017. She came to found The Green Fighter that year, later renamed as The Green Protector, through understanding the importance of youth engagement.

At first, The Green Protector aimed to bring together youth in the environment protection sector to create a better-protected environment in the local community. The organisation's aims remain the same, but now on a global scale. The Green Protector promotes the creation of youth networking platforms, social inclusion, innovative thinking, climate action and environmental education, now engaging with 25 different schools and universities. It has allowed Grace to work with 3500 young people, in addition to organising a cleaning day to clean up plastic in the local community and hosting a virtual dialogue between students from the University of Rwanda and South-West University in China about climate change.

In 2018, Grace was a climate change negotiator for the Rwandan delegation to the United Nations Framework Convention on Climate Change (UNFCCC), where she served as a youth contact to provide a youth perspective on important issues, such as climate change, to the government. Ineza's previous experience through the UNITAR course aided her in this position. In 2019, she became a Young African Leadership Initiative for Cohort 35, where she was trained on how to be a transformative leader in Africa and became a Global Shaper for the Kigali Hub. This role allowed her to connect with leaders in Kigali to influence policies on education, employment, health, and the environment. In 2020, Grace became a JWH initiative grantee—she used the grant to partake in an internship at the Global Green Growth Institute, where she helped implement projects while supporting youth engagement in line with Rwanda's environment and climate change policies.

In 2020, Grace was part of a team that started the Loss and Damage Youth Coalition, an alliance of over 600 youths from 60 different countries. Their purpose was to hold world leaders accountable and urge them to take action on addressing environmental loss and damage. The Green Protector is part of the founding organisation of the coalition. 2022 brought Grace to the COP27 global summit on climate change, where she helped present a demand from many youth activists for a fund to cover loss and damages. The campaign was successful, as World Leaders agreed to contribute to offsetting the effects of loss and damage on the most vulnerable nations.

Grace pursues her work for the CCLAD (Politics of Climate Change Loss and Damage) project, raising awareness about how social and political practices at international and national levels influence the usual process of construction, conveyance and contestation. She additionally continues to be an activist against climate change and for eco-feminism through her work at The Green Protector and posts on Twitter.

== Awards ==
Grace has achieved some awards for her efforts in eco-feminism, climate activism and environmentalism.

Award name	Year	Organisation	Reason
Dragon's Den: Community-Based Adaptation	2020	IIED	Her business idea to turn climate adaptation projects into investible projects.
Young Explorer	2020	National Geographic	The contributions of her organisation, The Green Protector, along with her work for the Loss and Damage Youth Coalition, UNFCCC and Cohort 35.
100 Top African Conservation Leaders	2021	100 Top African Conservation Leaders	Her work with her organisation, The Green Protector, and all that it has been able to achieve. She approaches environment, conservation and climate change with a unique roadmap that enables youth to equip themselves to be actors of change in their communities.
Global Citizen Prize	2023	Global Citizen	Her eco-feminist activism in the fight for global climate justice and her crucial leadership for loss and damage climate action.
