= Global Citizen Prize =

- Awarded for: Humanitarian efforts
- First award: 2016
- Website: https://www.globalcitizen.org/en/prize/

The Global Citizen Prize is an awards show organized by Global Citizen (formerly known as the Global Poverty Project), aimed at celebrating activists and leaders around the world. It began in September 2016 with the George Harrison Global Citizen Award (later renamed the Global Artist of the Year Award), and expanded to include more awards in 2018, 2019, and 2020.

== History ==
=== 2016 ===
The inaugural George Harrison Global Citizen Award was posthumously awarded to George Harrison during the “World on Stage” event at the 2016 Global Citizen Festival in New York.

=== 2017 ===
In 2017, the George Harrison Award was given to Annie Lennox for her dedication to humanitarian work at the 2017 Global Citizen Festival in New York.

=== 2018 ===
At the 2018 Global Citizen Festival: Mandela 100 event in Johannesburg, South Africa, the Global Poverty Project presented their first ever Global Citizen Prize for a World Leader, to Norwegian Prime Minister Erna Solberg, and the Cisco Youth Leadership Award, given to Wawira Njiru.

=== 2019 ===
The 2019 Global Citizen Prize Awards was the first year awards were presented at a ceremony, hosted by John Legend at the Royal Albert Hall in London on December 13, 2019. The following prizes were presented during the ceremony, which was broadcast by NBC on December 20:

Global Citizen of the Year - Richard Curtis

Global Artist of the Year - Sting

Global Citizen Prize for World Leader - Amina J. Mohammed, Deputy Secretary General of the United Nations

Global Citizen Prize for Business Leader - Hamdi Ulukaya, Chobani Founder/CEO

Cisco Youth Leadership Award - Priya Prakash

=== 2020 ===
The Global Citizen Prize Awards were broadcast (on NBC in the United States, and the CBC in Canada) and streamed live on December 19, 2020, and were hosted again by John Legend. The 2020 awards introduced multiple new awards for philanthropy, culture and education, activism, and the Country Hero Award.

Global Citizen of the Year - Bryan Stevenson

Global Citizen Artist of the Year - Elton John

Global Citizen Prize for World Leader - Ursula von der Leyen

Global Citizen Prize for Business Leader - Temie Giwa-Tubosun, Founder and CEO at LifeBank (Nigeria)

Global Citizen Prize for Activism - Black Lives Matter movement

Global Citizen Prize for Culture & Education - Sesame Workshop

Global Citizen Prize for Philanthropy - Warren Buffett

=== 2022 ===
The 2022 Global Citizen Awards were awarded at a private dinner event, on May 22, in New York’s Gotham Hall.

==== Cisco Youth Leadership Award ====
- Nidhi Pant, S4S Technologies, India

==== Global Citizen Prize: Citizen Award Winners ====
- Mexico: Mitzy Violeta Cortés Guzmán, Futuros Indígenas Network & Milpa Project
- Samoa: Brianna Fruean, Pacific Climate Warriors
- Germany: Anuscheh Amir-Khalili, Band of Sisters, part of NGO Flamingo
- UK: Payzee Mahmod, Iranian & Kurdish Women’s Rights Organization (IKWRO)
- South Africa: Khanyisile Motsa, Berea-Hillbrow Home of Hope
- Nigeria: 'Yemi Adamolekun, Enough is Enough (EiE) Nigeria; Active Citizen & Connector
- USA: Barbie Izquierdo, Food Security Activist and Consultant

=== 2023 ===
The 2023 awards were presented during the Global Citizen NOW summit at The Glasshouse in New York City on Thursday April 27, 2023

==== Cisco Youth Leadership Award ====
- Nkosana Butholenkosi Masuku

==== Global Citizen Prize ====
- Deja Foxx
- Pashtana Durrani
- Wangari Kuria
- Ineza Umuhoza Grace

=== 2024 ===
The 2024 awards were presented during the Global Citizen NOW summit in New York City on Thursday May 1, 2024

==== Cisco Youth Leadership Award ====
- Ricardo Enrique Alba Torres, CEO & Co-Founder of Eko Group H2O+

==== Global Citizen Prize: Citizen Award Winners ====
- Tanzania: Lydia Charles Moyo, Founder and Executive Director of Her Initiative and Innovator at Panda Digital
- Democratic Republic of Congo: Olivier Bahemuke Ndoole, Maître / GREEN LAWYER at ACEDH
- Fiji: Vishal Prasad, Campaign Director at Pacific Islands Students Fighting Climate Change
- Ireland: Sophie Healy-Thow, Founder of Act4Food
- Uganda: Andrew Ddembe, Founder & Executive Director of MobiKlinic

=== 2025 ===
The 2025 awards were presented during the Global Citizen NOW summit at in New York City on Thursday April 30, 2025

==== Cisco Youth Leadership Award ====
- Esther Kimani, Farmer Lifeline Technologies

==== Global Citizen Prize: Citizen Award Winners ====
- Ukraine: Valeriia Rachynska, 100% Life
- Brazil: Taily Terena, Institute of Indigenous Memory and Science
- Nigeria: Omowumi Ogunrotimi, Gender Mobile Initiative
- Ghana: Lydia Kekeli Amenyaglo, Ghana Food Movement
