= Enough is Enough (Nigeria) =

Nigerian Advocacy Group

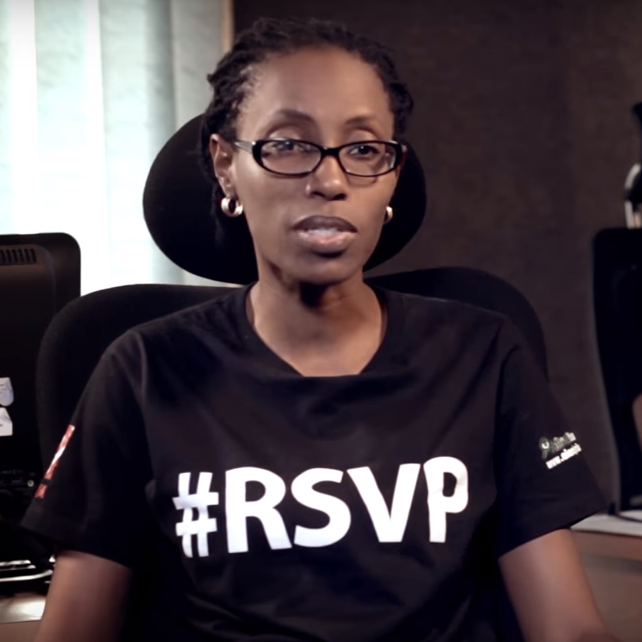
Yemi Adamolekun - Executive director of Enough is Enough in 2015

Enough is Enough is a coalition of Nigerian youth advocacy groups to promote better governance and political accountability in the country. Based in Lagos and Abuja, it has organized concerts, petitions, protests and workshops to call attention to the violence being committed by Boko Haram, freedom for the kidnapped Chibok girls, high remuneration of legislators and denial of visa for elected officials who travel abroad for medical care.

The executive director is Yemi Adamolekun. In the run-up to the 2015 general elections, the group organized a mobilization campaign to encourage voter registration by youths. In February 2017, the group planned to hold a rally in Lagos to draw attention to the economic situation in the country.
