= Yemi Adamolekun =

Nigerian executive director

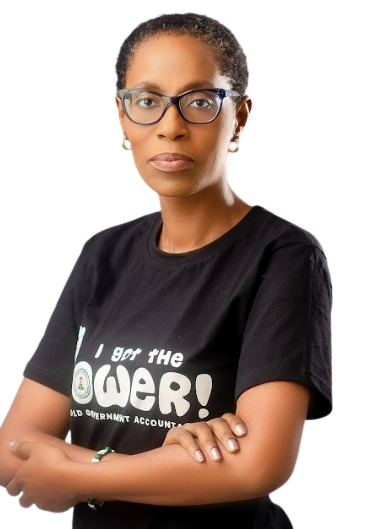
- Adamolekun in 2022
- Born: 12 January 1975 (age 51)
- Education: University of Lagos, University of Oxford, University of Virginia
- Occupation: Activist
- Organization: Enough is Enough
- Known for: Activism and Social Campaigning
- Awards: Most Influential People of African Descent, Global Citizen Prize

Yemi Adamolekun (born 12 January 1975) is a Nigerian activist and the former founding executive director of Enough is Enough, a civil society organisation that advocates for better governance in Nigeria. She is also a senior associate at the Center for Strategic and International Studies. Adamolekun participates in political discussions and was awarded a Global Citizen Prize in 2022.

== Early life and education ==
Adamolekun was born on 12 January 1975 and grew up on the campus of Obafemi Awolowo University at Ifẹ in Nigeria. She was educated at the University of Lagos, later studied at the University of Virginia, and pursued postgraduate qualifications at the London School of Economics and the Saïd Business School at the University of Oxford.

== Career ==
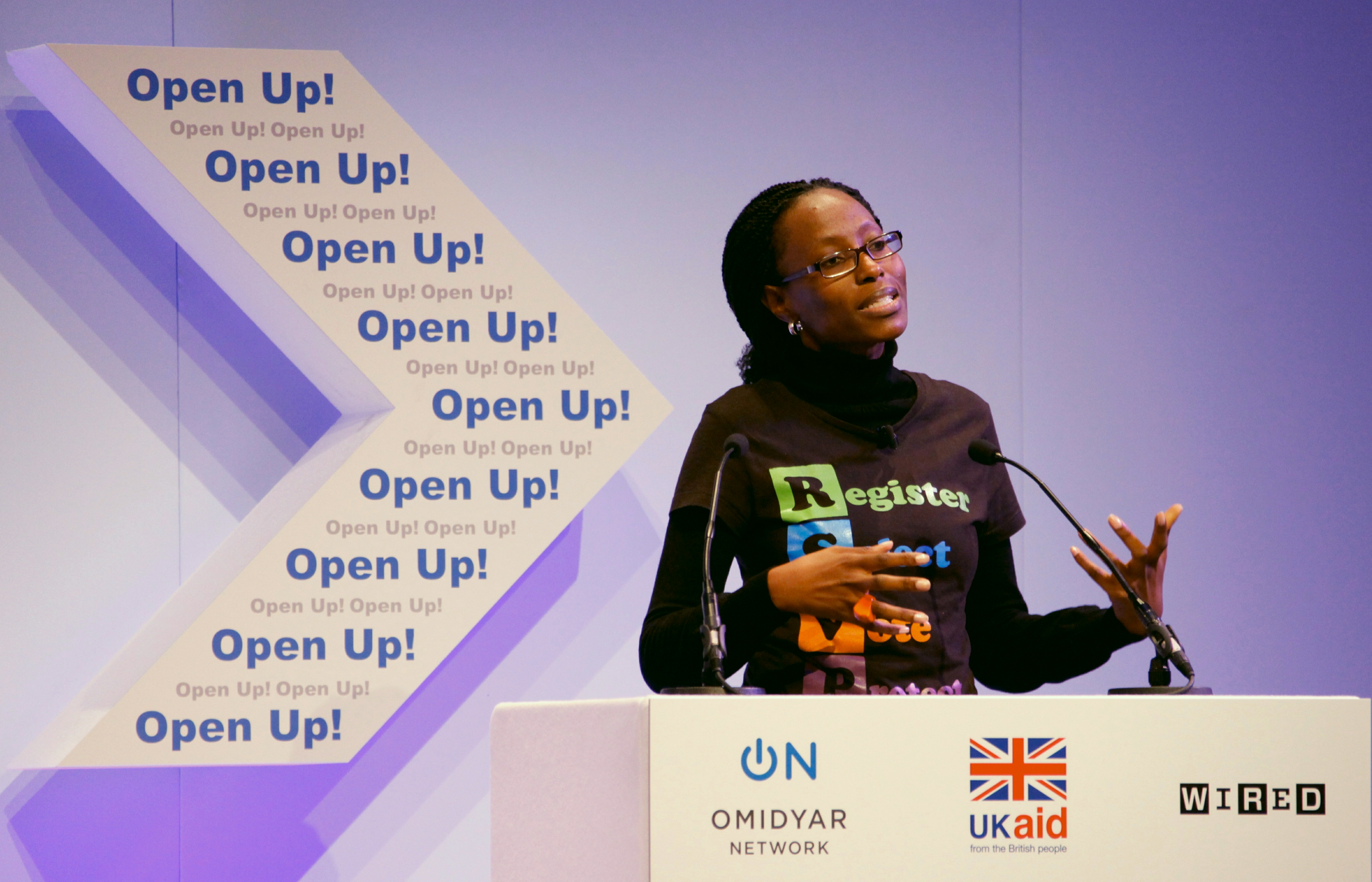
Yemi Adamolekun speaking at a conference in 2012

Adamolekun began her career working at Navigant Consulting in the US, then returned to Nigeria to work at Alder Consulting. For 14 years (specifically between 2011 and 2025) she served as the executive director of Enough is Enough (Nigeria), which campaigns for better governance. The organisation co-ordinates different groups and broadcasts radio shows in 25 states. It supports local initiatives, for example working against violence in Katsina, reopening a healthcare centre in Osun State and helping to repair the roofs of schools in Niger State. Adamolekun commented to AllAfrica: "part of why Nigeria is unpeaceful is huge amounts of poverty: people fighting over scarce resources, insecurity, distrust – people desperate to survive". During the elections, Enough is Enough began its "RSVP" campaign, encouraging people to Register, Select, Vote and Protect. It also demanded more transparency in the National Assembly and participated in the "BringBackOurGirls" movement following the Chibok schoolgirls kidnapping.

Adamolekun is also a senior associate in the Center for Strategic and International Studies.

== Other events ==
In 2018, Adamolekun's name appeared on the list of Most Influential People of African Descent (MIPAD). Also in 2018, she criticised President Muhammadu Buhari for going abroad to seek medical treatment for himself and his son, whilst healthcare professionals in Nigeria were on strike for better working conditions.

Alongside Israel Aye, Ndidi Okonkwo Nwuneli and Yemi Osinaike, Adamolekun was on a panel that asked political candidates questions in the Lagos gubernatorial debate before the 2019 Nigerian general election. She then became a spokesperson for the Not in My Church movement, when Pastor Biodun Fatoyinbo returned to the Commonwealth of Zion Assembly church a month after leaving it in the wake of underage rape allegations.

In November 2019, she attended a demonstration in support of Omoyele Sowore in Abuja and alleged that members of the State Security Service had attacked her and broken her mobile telephone whilst she was recording two journalists being beaten up. She had pledged to attend every court hearing of Sowore. In December 2019, Sowore was released and re-arrested the following day, and Adamolekun was at another demonstration which was attacked by unknown people. In 2022, she was awarded a Global Citizen Prize.
