= Red Lobster =

American casual dining restaurant chain

Red Lobster Hospitality LLC

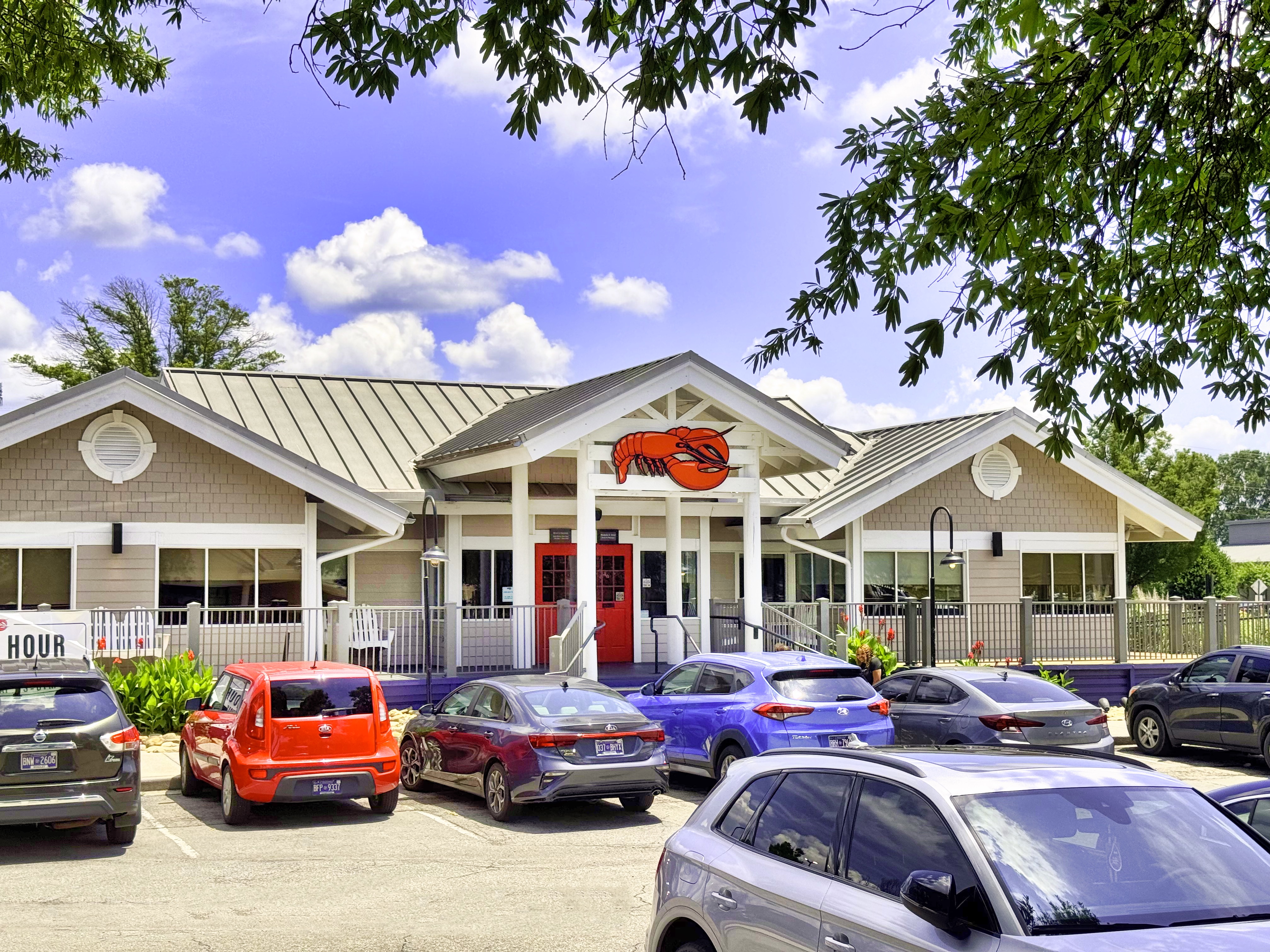
- Location in Chattanooga, Tennessee
- Trade name: Red Lobster
- Type: Subsidiary
- Industry: Restaurant
- Genre: Casual dining
- Founded: January 18, 1968; 58 years ago Lakeland, Florida, US
- Founders: Bill Darden; Charley Woodsby
- Headquarters: Orlando, Florida, US
- Number of locations: 545 (2025)
- Area served: United States; Canada; Mexico; Ecuador; Japan; Thailand
- Key people: Damola Adamolekun (CEO)
- Products: Seafood; chicken; steaks; pasta
- Revenue: US$2.6 billion (2018)
- Number of employees: 55,000
- Parent: Darden Restaurants/General Mills Restaurants (1970–2014); Golden Gate Capital (2014–2020); Thai Union Group (2020–2024); RL Investor Holdings (2024–present)
- Website: RedLobster.com

Red Lobster Hospitality LLC is an American casual dining restaurant chain headquartered in Orlando, Florida. The company has operations across most of the United States (including Puerto Rico), and Canada, as well as in Ecuador, Japan, Mexico, and Thailand. Golden Gate Capital was Red Lobster's parent company after it was acquired from Darden Restaurants on July 28, 2014. Seafood supplier Thai Union acquired a 25% stake in the company in 2016 for a reported $575 million and in 2020 purchased the remaining portion from GGC.

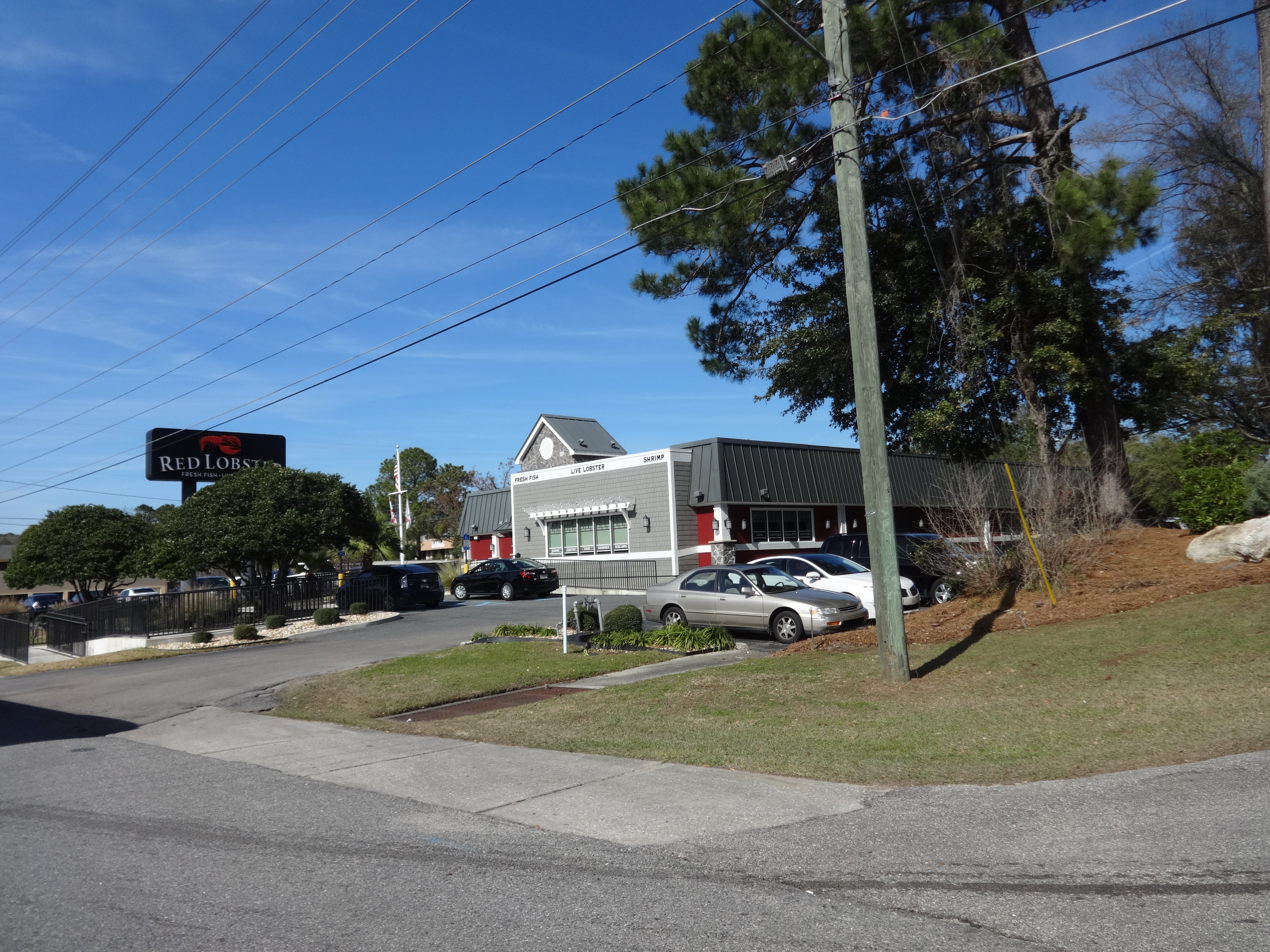
Location in Tallahassee, Florida in 2015; believed to be the chain's longest-operating location.

In May 2024, Red Lobster closed at least 99 of its restaurants and then filed for Chapter 11 bankruptcy protection after securing over $100 million in financing commitments from its lenders. The company has also entered a stalking horse agreement to sell itself and have its lenders manage it.

== History ==
=== Formation and growth ===
The first Red Lobster restaurant was opened on January 18, 1968, in Lakeland, Florida, by entrepreneurs Bill Darden and Charley Woodsby. The oft-quoted date of March 27, 1968, is based on the incorporation date of Red Lobster Inns of America, Inc. (now GMRI, Inc.) in the Florida Secretary of State's Office.

Originally billed as the "Harbor for Seafood Lovers", the first restaurant was followed by four others throughout the American South. In 1970, General Mills acquired Red Lobster as a five-unit company and with new backing, the chain expanded rapidly in the 1980s.

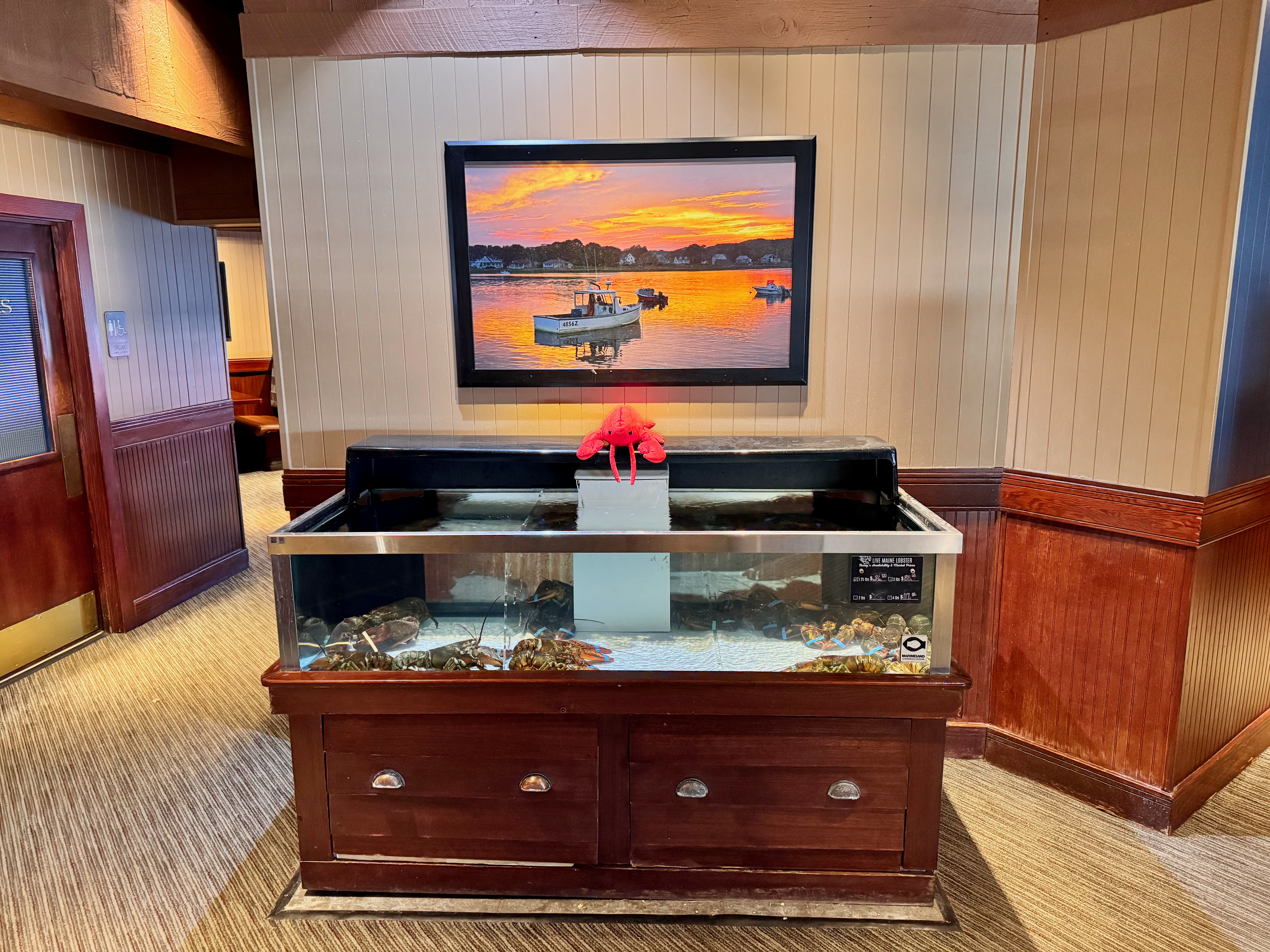
The live lobster tank is a staple in Red Lobster restaurant lobbies

Red Lobster entered Canada in the 1980s, in many cases by buying Ponderosa Steakhouse locations. Currently, Red Lobster generally maintains between 25 and 30 locations in Canada, the bulk in larger urban centres in Ontario (across Southern Ontario (from Southwestern Ontario through Golden Horseshoe and southern to Eastern Ontario) plus one in Sudbury, in northern Ontario and Barrie, Ontario in Central Ontario) with a smaller number in larger urban centres in all three Prairie provinces (Calgary, Edmonton, Regina, Saskatoon and Winnipeg). It exited the Quebec market (14 locations including Vanier and Montreal) in September 1997, due to financial losses, and was entirely absent from the Maritime provinces, British Columbia and the Arctic territories.

In 1991, Red Lobster introduced its now famous garlic cheese biscuits (given the name Cheddar Bay Biscuits in 1996) developed by culinary leader Kurt Hankins.

On March 29, 1994, Bill Darden died, after an extended illness, at the age of 75.

In 1995, Red Lobster (along with Olive Garden and other sister chains), became part of Darden Restaurants, Inc. During that time, General Mills decided to release Darden into an independent, publicly traded corporation.

=== 2009 prototype and sale ===
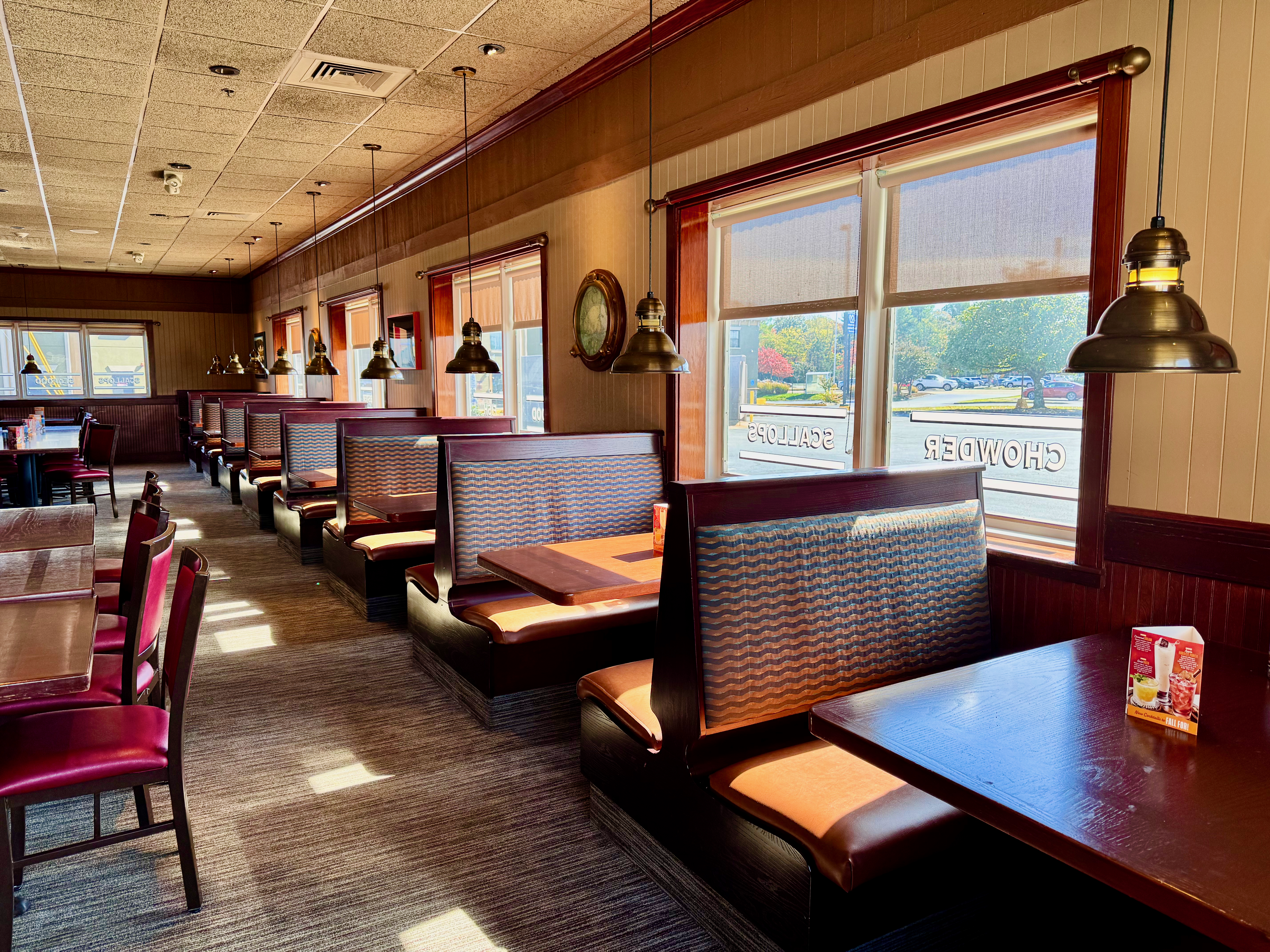
The interior of a Red Lobster in Knoxville, Tennessee

In 2009, Red Lobster debuted its new Bar Harbor restaurant prototype modeled after coastal New England architecture. The new exterior features include shingle and stone towers, signal flags, and Adirondack-style benches. The interior updates include dark wood paneling, warm-toned fabrics, soft lighting, and nautical decor and artwork.

On December 19, 2013, Darden Restaurants announced plans to sell or spin off the Red Lobster brand, citing pressure from stock investors. This was in direct response to Darden's going over budget on a new digital platform.

On May 12, 2014, Darden announced that as part of its spinoff of Red Lobster, it was converting the co-located Red Lobster and Olive Garden locations into standalone Olive Garden locations. On May 16, 2014, Darden announced it would be selling the Red Lobster seafood restaurant chain to Golden Gate Capital for US$2.1 billion. Darden announced the completion of the sale of Red Lobster on July 28, 2014. As part of the sale, a sale/leaseback of the real estate for 500 restaurants was completed to American Realty Capital Partners for $1.5 billion to finance the purchase. By 2023, rents totaled $200 million per year and was a factor in the 2024 bankruptcy filing.

On August 6, 2014, Red Lobster announced its new headquarters location in CNL Center City Commons in Orlando. On March 6, 2015, Red Lobster officially opened the Restaurant Support Center. Seafood supplier Thai Union acquired a 25 percent stake in the company in 2016 for a reported $575 million, and in 2020 purchased the remaining portion from GGC.

In 2021, Thai Union appointed Kelli Valade as Red Lobster's CEO. Valade brought in a new leadership team. However, in 2022, Thai Union began to bring in its representatives into Red Lobster's headquarters. Paul Kenny, who was part of the Thai Union-led investor group that acquired Red Lobster, sat on Red Lobster board. Kenny became Red Lobster's interim CEO in 2022, after disagreeing Valade's assessment that significant further investment was needed. Under Kenny's lead, the company removed two of its longtime shrimp suppliers, leaving Thai Union to supply the shrimp at higher costs in "coordination with Thai Union and under the guise of a 'quality review'". Other Thai Union representatives became more involved in the company's supply chain, finance, operations and strategy teams. Changes to restaurant operations and menus alienated customers and staff while hurting sales. Promotions became shrimp-centric, capping with the Ultimate Endless Shrimp promotion which customers could have a buffet of shrimps with no limits. It was estimated that the restaurant would lose $3 for each customer who came in for the shrimp promotion in some areas. It was alleged that Thai Union was clearing its inventory as the shrimps they sold were initially fresh and then frozen with dates progressively "went further into the past".

=== Restructuring and bankruptcy ===
In March 2024, Jonathan Tibus was hired as the company's new CEO. Tibus previously was CEO during the bankruptcy of Kona Grill and the chief restructuring officer of Krystal. Officials deemed Red Lobster as a "zombie brand" and said that they were exploring options to save the company, including a restructuring turnaround, fire sale, or a possible bankruptcy filing. Red Lobster also announced that it was searching for a new buyer, and if one could not be found, the company may file for bankruptcy within the coming months.

On April 16, 2024, Bloomberg reported that Red Lobster was preparing to file for Chapter 11 bankruptcy, highlighting leases and labor costs among the issues. The company planned to exit some underperforming leases as well as address other long-term contracts and rising labor costs. The company expected to continue operating normally during the bankruptcy procedure while discussing a possible bankruptcy debt reduction plan with its creditors.

On May 13, 2024, Red Lobster abruptly closed some restaurants in 28 states. This included all of its Buffalo-area locations and most of its Orlando-area locations. TAGeX Brands conducted liquidation auctions for restaurant fixtures and supplies at the closed locations and concluded them by May 16.

On May 20, 2024, Red Lobster filed for Chapter 11 bankruptcy protection after securing over $100 million in financing commitments from its lenders. The company had also entered a stalking horse agreement to sell itself and have its lenders manage it, which would allow for the company to receive financing and shed some of its $1 billion debt. On May 23, 2024, Red Lobster announced that their Canadian operations would also be declaring bankruptcy by no later than May 28. The company would close some underperforming Canadian locations during the proceedings.

On June 6, 2024, Red Lobster announced that if their bankruptcy plan ended up getting approved, up to 129 additional locations would be permanently shut down. One of these locations included their restaurant at Times Square in Manhattan. On June 12, hip hop rapper Flavor Flav was hired by the company to be the spokesperson of Red Lobster commercials, after he previously ordered the entire Red Lobster menu in order to save the company. In his first commercial, he would announce that CrabFest would be returning to restaurants nationwide.

On June 14, it was reported that Fortress Investment Group, a Wall Street investment firm co-founded by the Milwaukee Bucks co-owner Wesley Edens, was interested in saving Red Lobster out of bankruptcy. The company evaluated which regions would fit Red Lobster's attempted comeback and revival. That same day, Red Lobster Canada announced that it would ask the Ontario court to recognize its stalking horse bid and approve a sales process as soon as the next week. This procedure would allow the company to preserve their operations in Canada, as the bid would allow for lenders avoid the risk of assets being sold for a lower price. On June 18, an Ontario court approved the sale procedure for Red Lobster Canada.

On August 25, 2024, Red Lobster announced the closure of 23 additional restaurants, all of which were set to be shuttered by August 31. On August 26, Damola Adamolekun was appointed CEO of Red Lobster, replacing Tibus.

On September 5, 2024, a court approved Red Lobster's bankruptcy plan. RL Investor Holdings, a private group of investors consisted of TCW Private Credit, Blue Torch and funds managed by Fortress Investment Group, acquired the company after court approval on September 16. Red Lobster officially exited Chapter 11 bankruptcy that day.

== Promotions ==
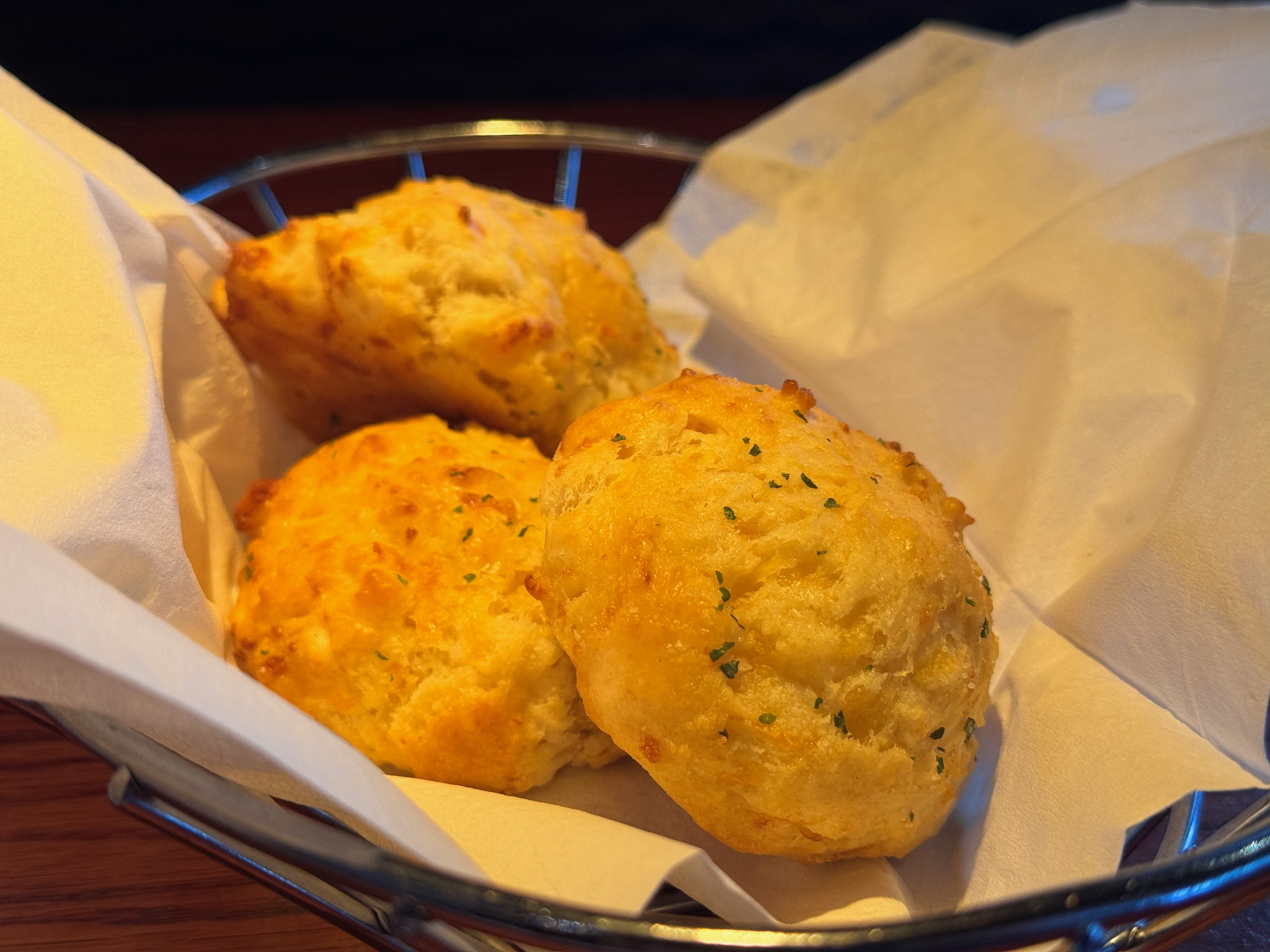
A basket of Cheddar Bay Biscuits at Red Lobster

In 2003, Red Lobster offered an endless snow crab leg promotion, the second in its history. The promotion resulted in its parent company, Darden Restaurants, taking a $3 million charge to third-quarter earnings, resulting in president Edna Morris's departure from the company.

The ill-timed promotion was launched amid high wholesale crab leg prices. The chain also underestimated how many times a customer would order more. Further complicating matters at the restaurant level was the time customers spent table-side in the restaurant cracking crab legs. This resulted in increased waiting times in the lobby and overall diminished customer capacity per hour.

Red Lobster introduced a new Daily Deals menu in 2020, featuring Endless Shrimp Mondays and more deals.

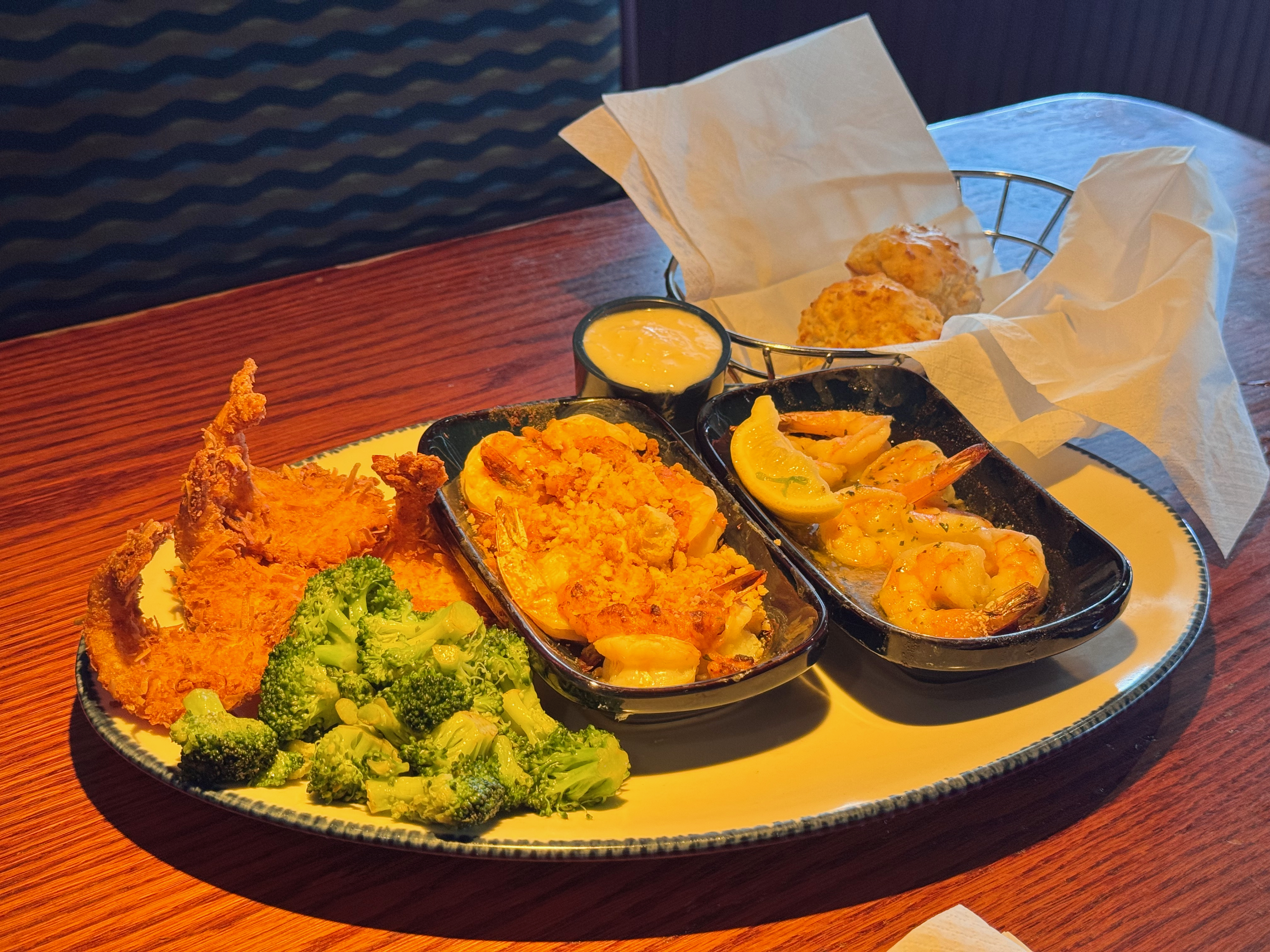
An Endless Shrimp meal

In June 2023, Red Lobster reintroduced Ultimate Endless Shrimp, normally run as a limited-time promotion during autumn, as a permanent addition to their menu. For $20, guests could order two shrimp dishes to start, and keep ordering until they were full. This resulted in a $11 million loss for Red Lobster in its third quarter earnings for that year, as the company underestimated the amount of customers taking advantage of a deal that had low profit margins. In response, Red Lobster raised the prices on the deal twice, from $20 to $22, and then to $25.

== Menu ==
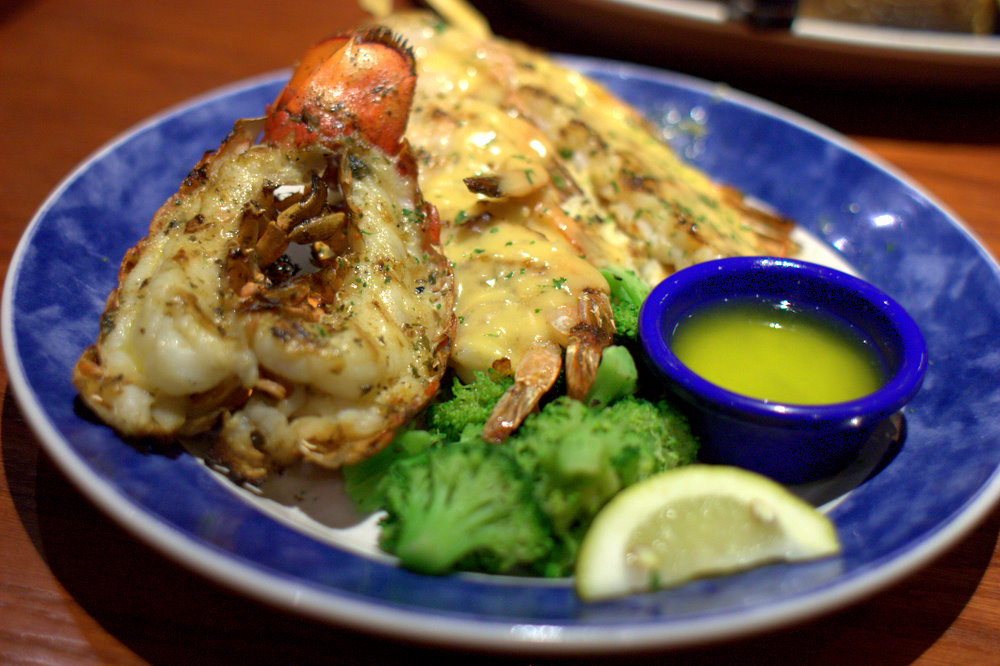
A Lobsterfest duo meal

The brand specializes in seafood, including crab, fish, lobster, mollusks, and shrimp. It also serves chicken, desserts, pasta, and steak.

In June 2025, Red Lobster introduced bagged seafood boils, including the Mariner's Boil and Sailor's Boil, as part of its Crabfest promotion. The seafood boils have since become permanent menu items.

=== Lobster bisque controversy ===
In February 2016, Inside Edition reported that Red Lobster used a mix of less expensive langostino along with Maine lobster in its lobster bisque recipe.

== Locations ==
As of February 13, 2025, the company had 514 locations worldwide. These locations span 44 US states, Canada, Ecuador, Japan, Mexico, and Thailand.

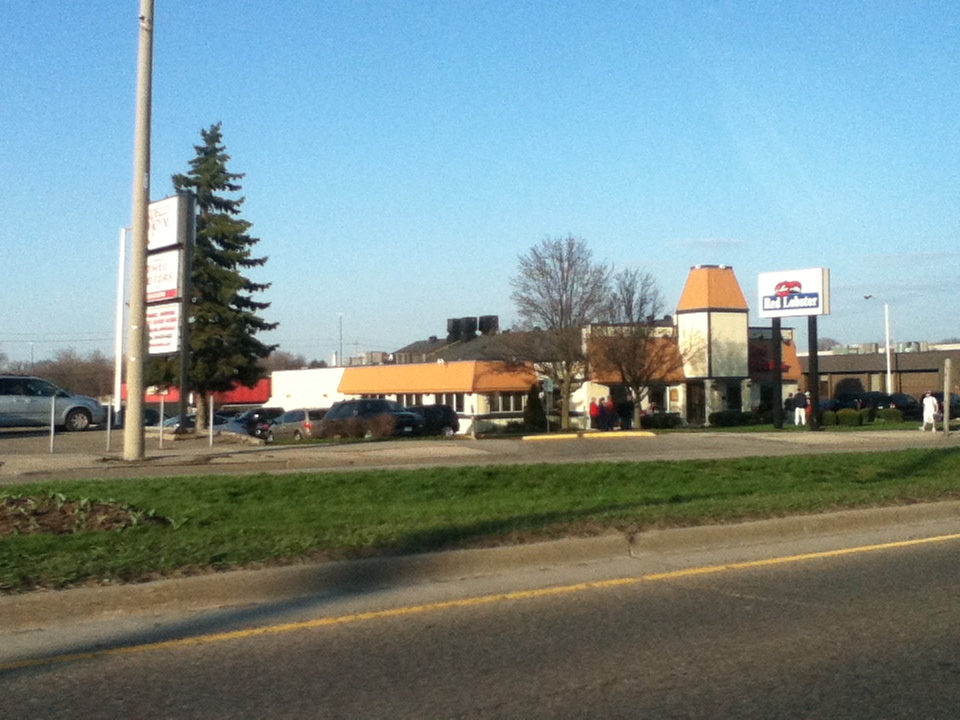
The Red Lobster in Kitchener, Ontario (2013). This is one of the Ponderosa remakes, as are most Red Lobsters in Canada

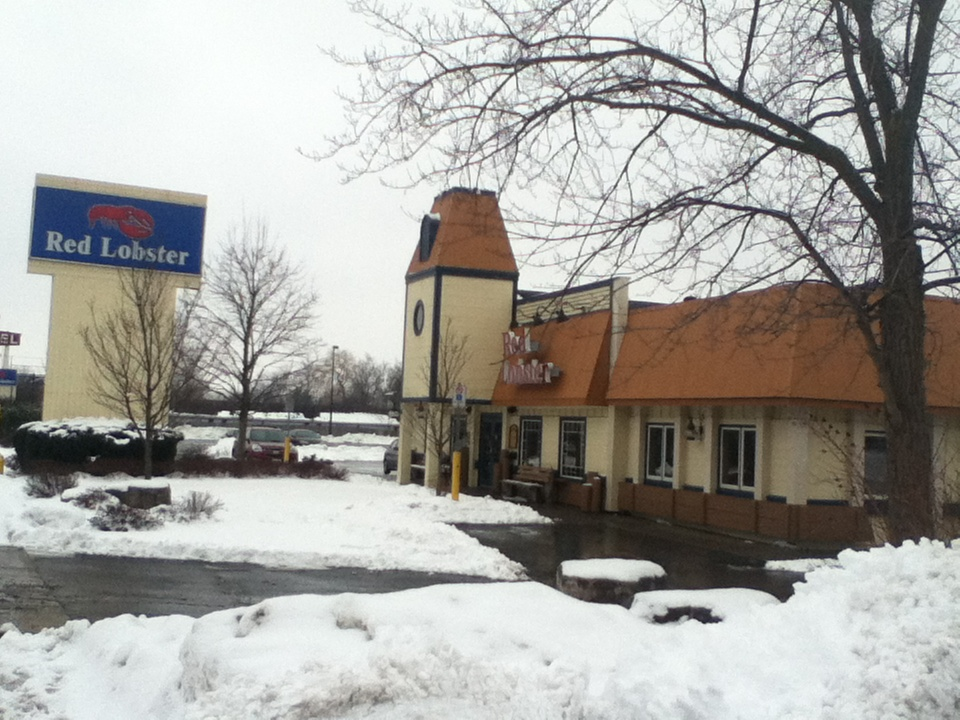
The Red Lobster in London, Ontario (2013). This one is also a Ponderosa remake, and also has an addition to the right, as it was added on when the Dundas location in London closed, around the late 80s.

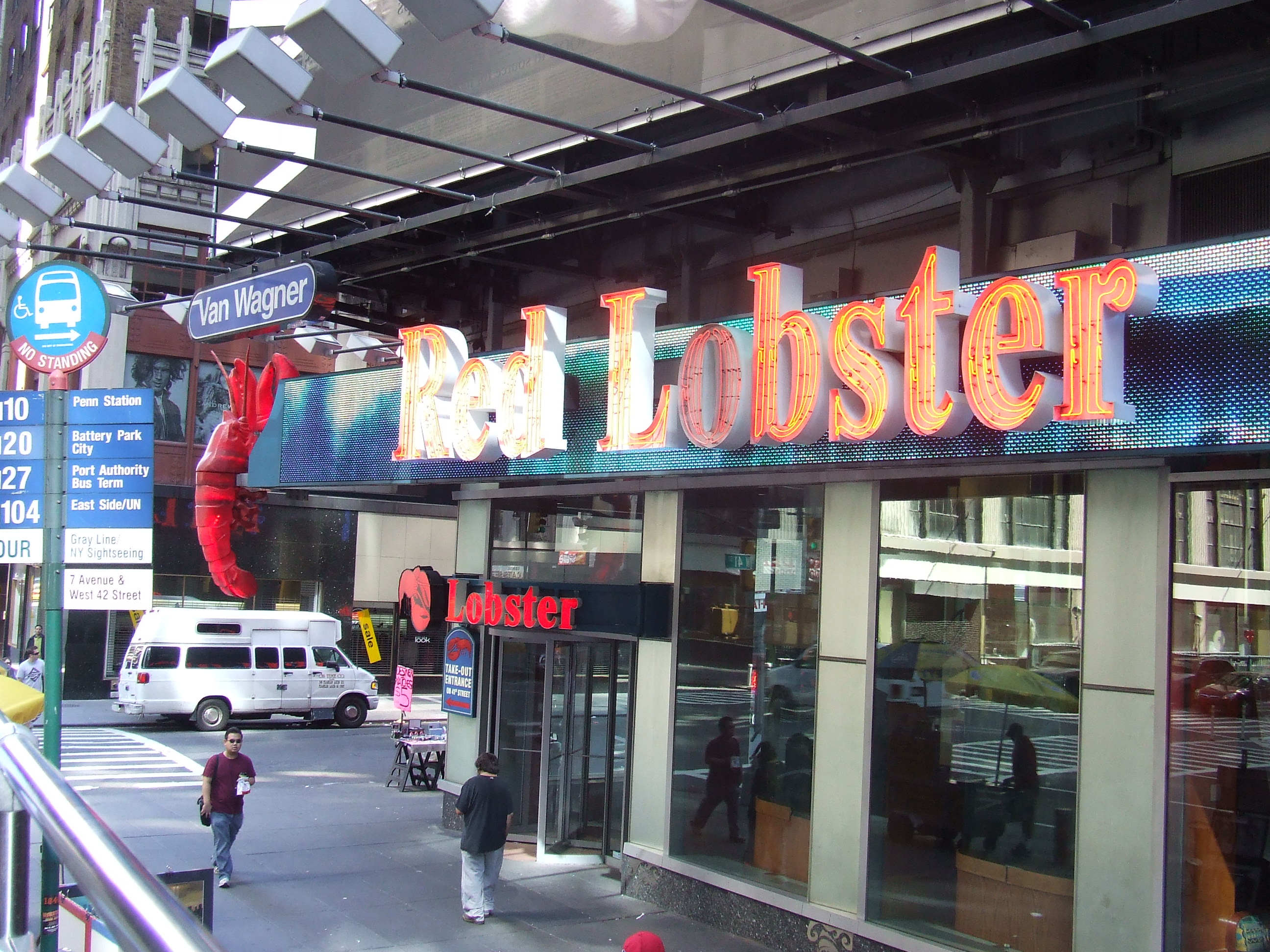
Red Lobster on 7th Avenue, in Times Square, New York City (2007)

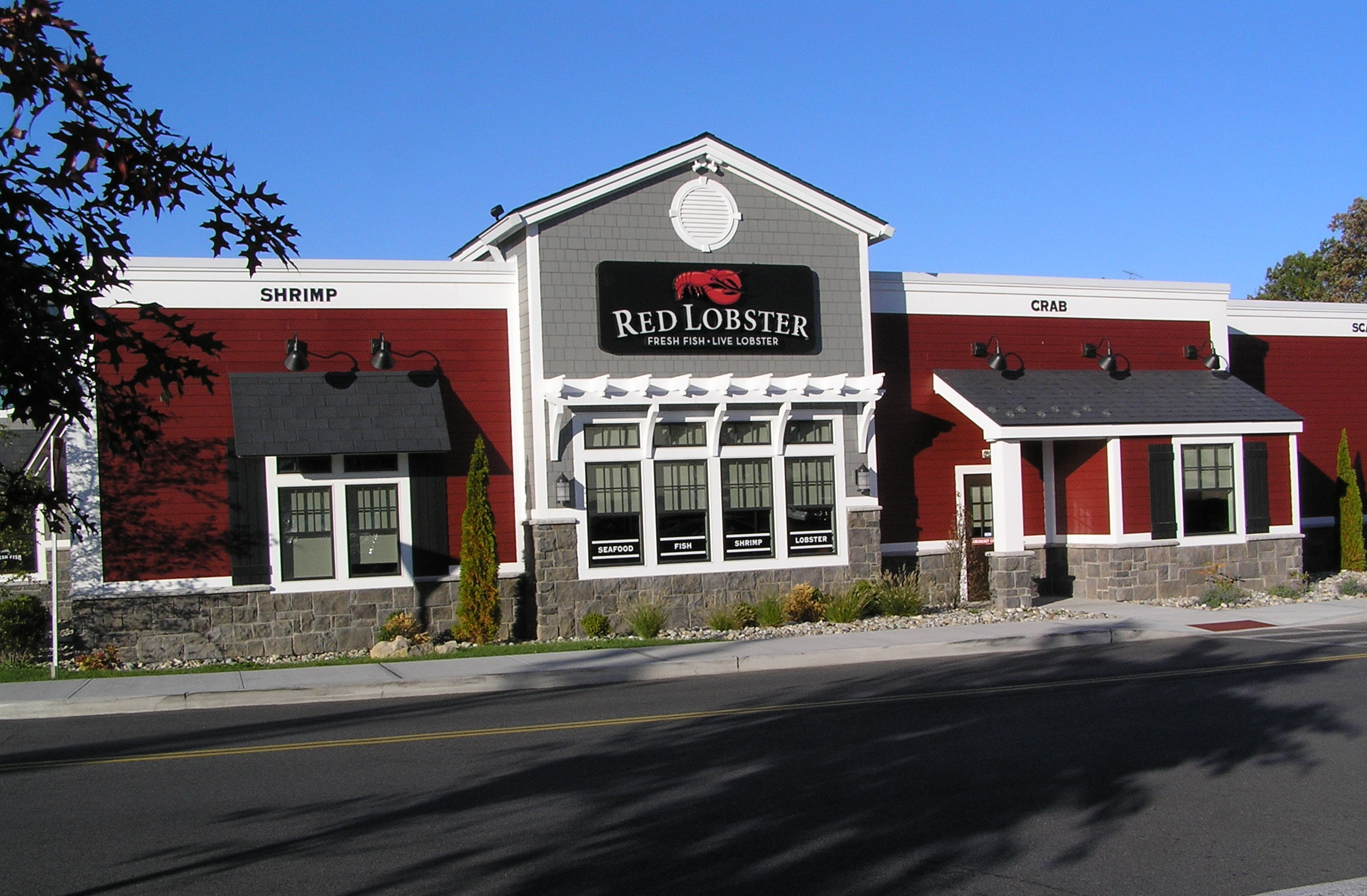
Red Lobster in Yonkers, New York (2012)

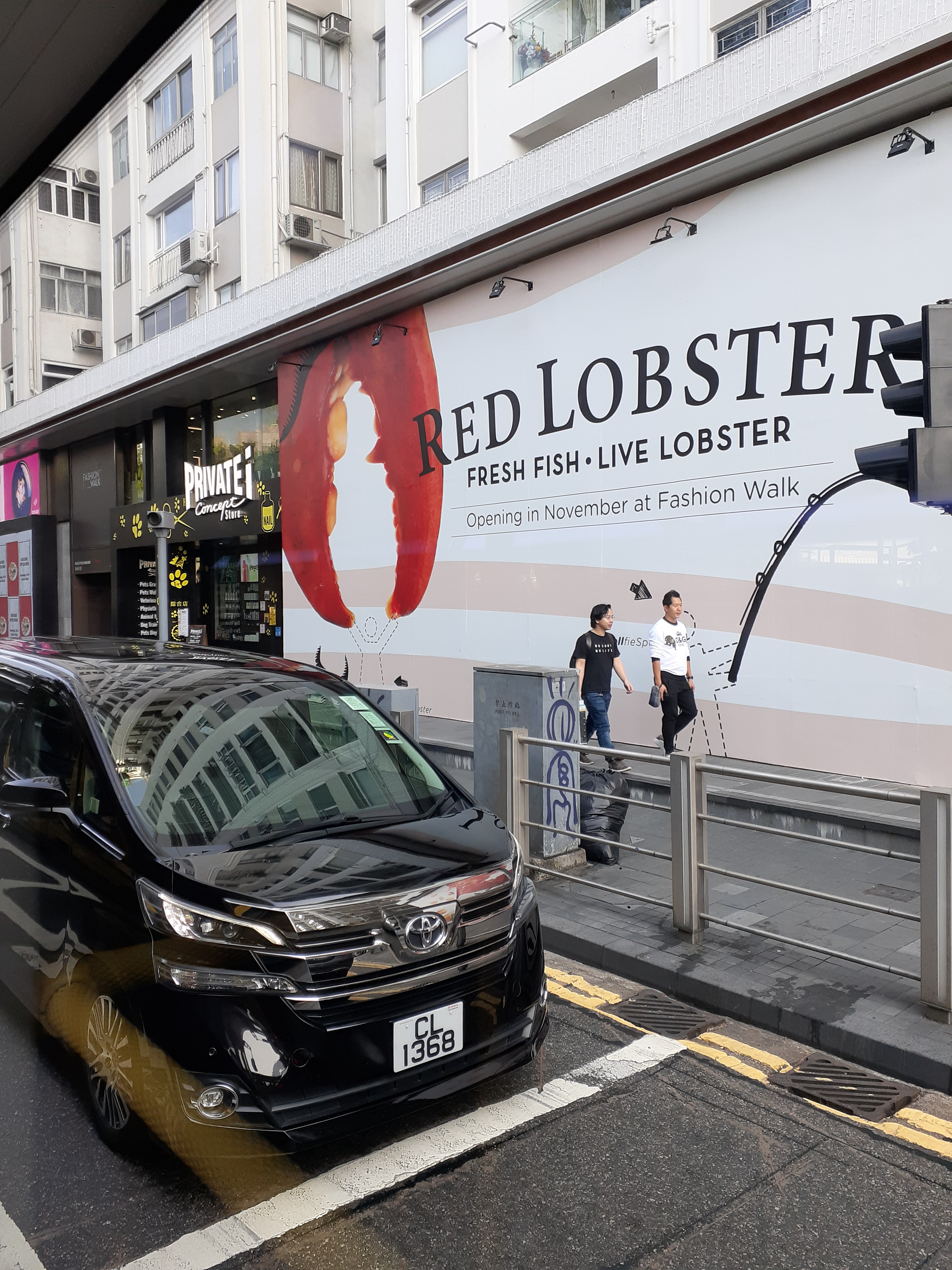
Red Lobster opening in Hong Kong (2010).

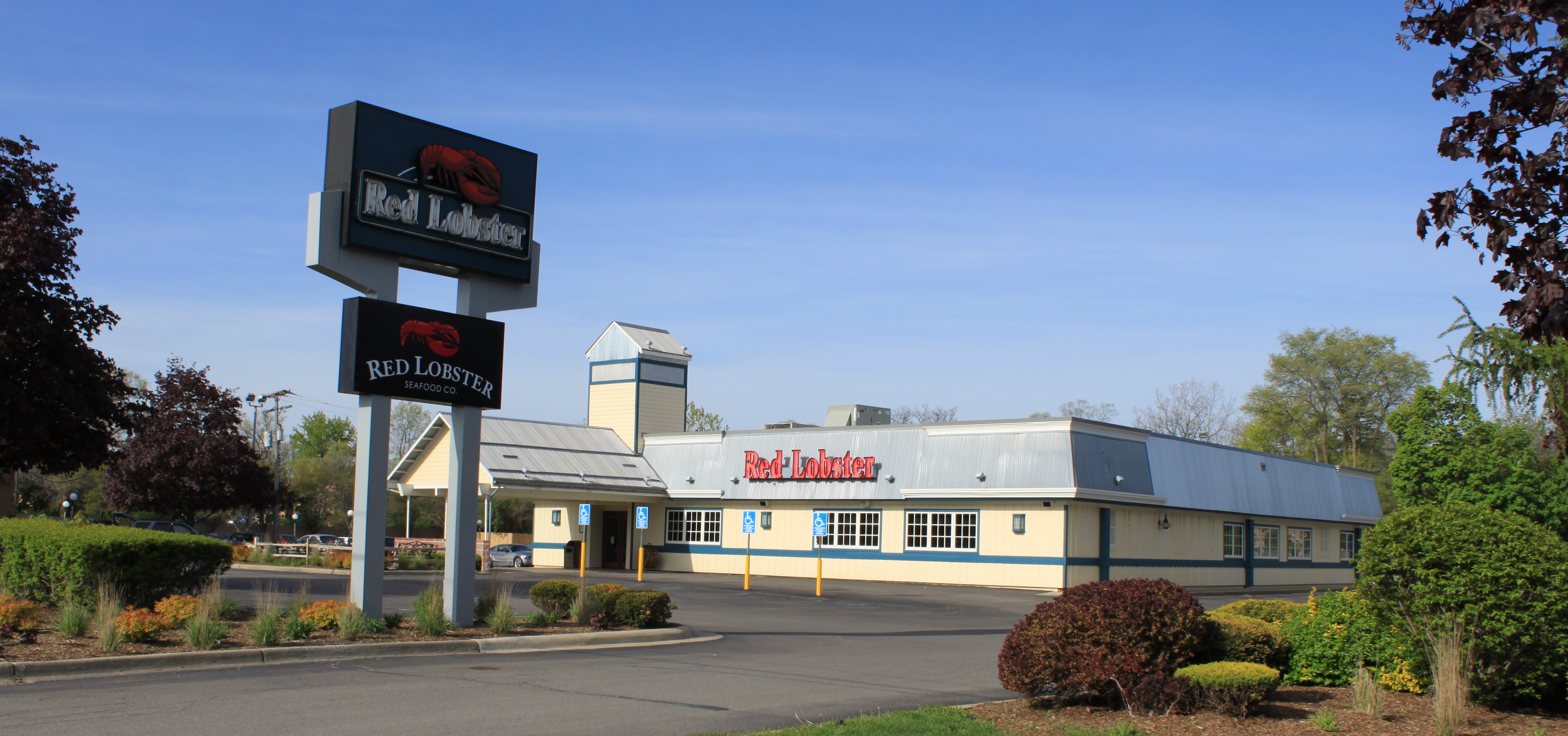
Red Lobster in Ann Arbor, Michigan (2010)

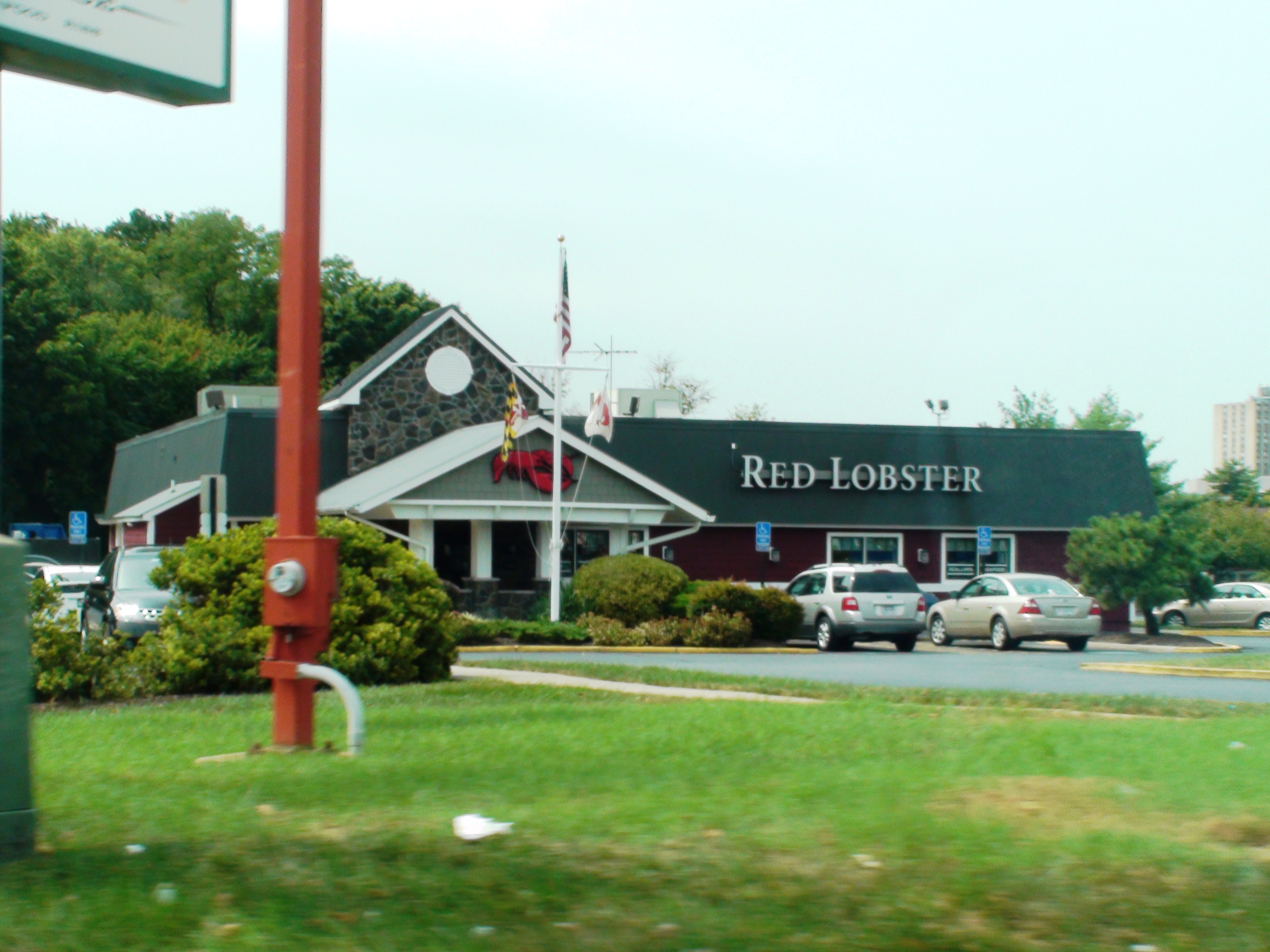
Red Lobster in Gaithersburg, Maryland, in September 2013 (now closed).

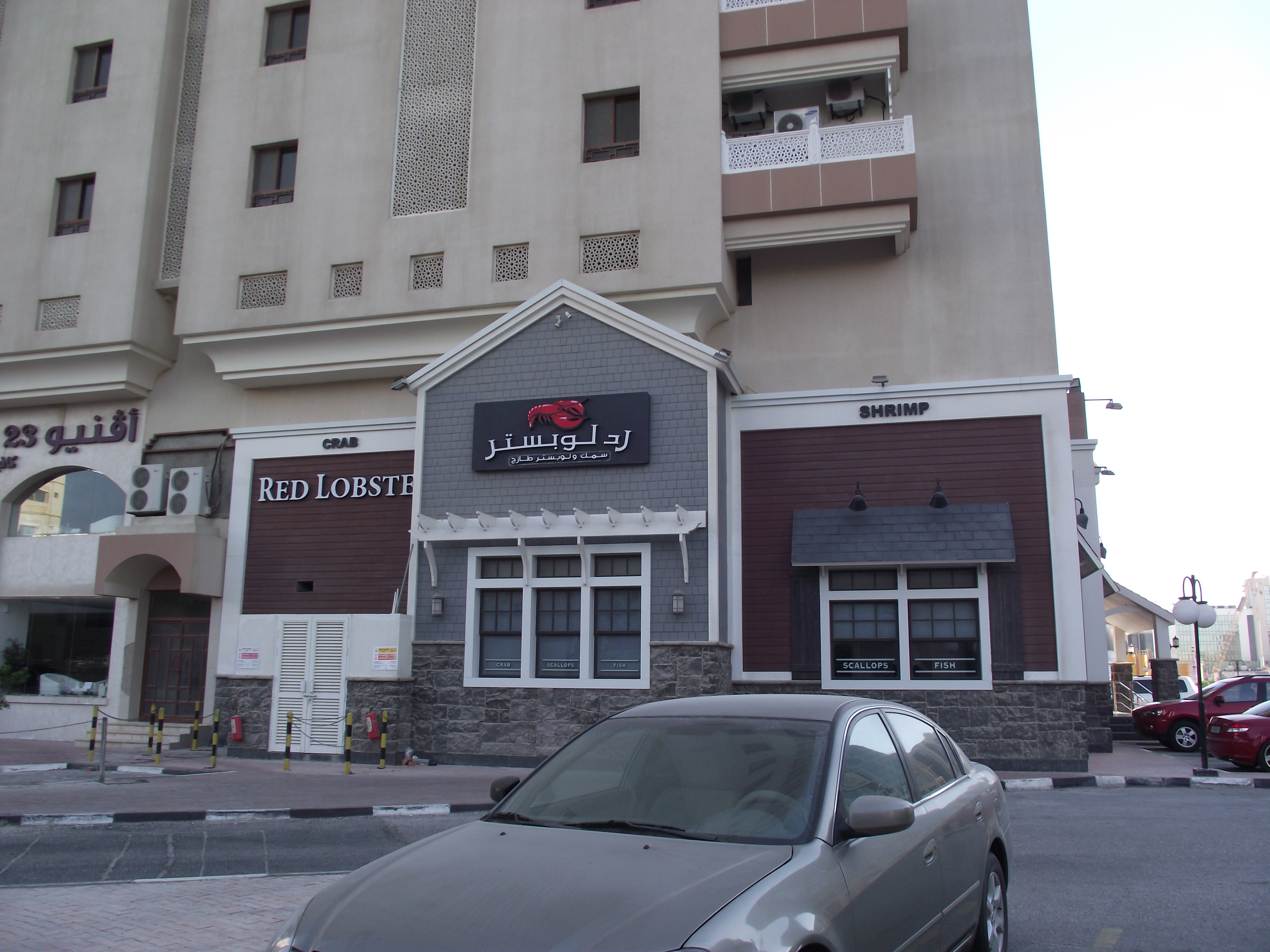
Red Lobster in Doha, Qatar, opened to the public in June 2012, making it the company's second Red Lobster restaurant to be established in the Middle East.

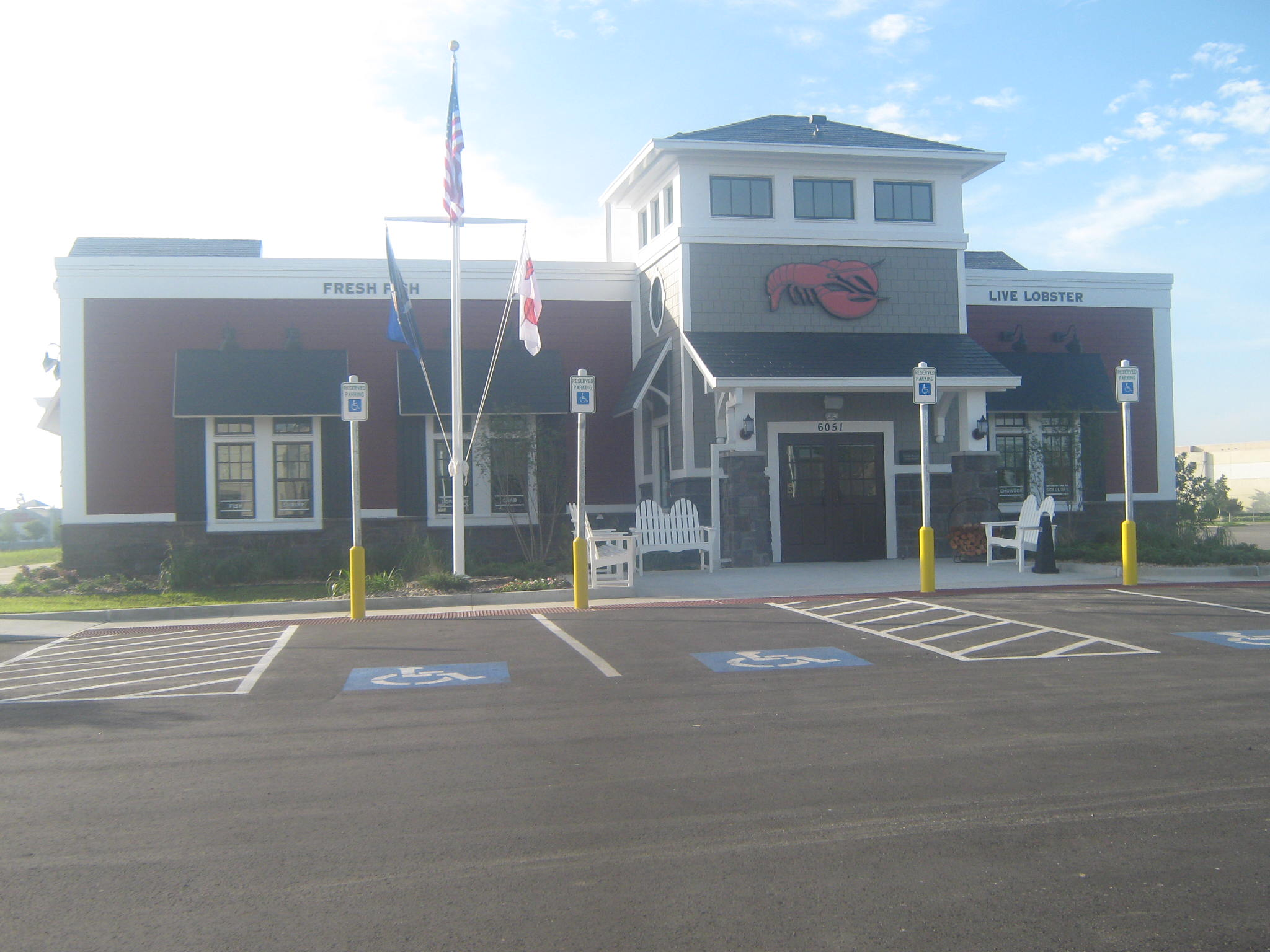
The "Bar Harbor" prototype design as seen at the Baton Rouge, Louisiana location

== In popular culture ==
In 2007, writer Stewart O'Nan published the novella Last Night at the Lobster about the closing of a Red Lobster restaurant in Connecticut.

In February 2016, singer Beyoncé referenced Red Lobster in her single "Formation". After unexpectedly releasing the single and performing it during the Super Bowl 50 halftime show, Red Lobster reported a 33% sales increase.

== See also ==
- List of casual dining restaurant chains
- List of seafood restaurants
