= Damola Adamolekun =

Nigerian-American business executive

- Born: February 1989 (age 37); Nigeria
- Citizenship: Nigeria; United States (since 1998)
- Education: Brown University (BA); Harvard Business School (MBA)
- Occupation: Businessman
- Years active: 2020–present
- Employer(s): Goldman Sachs; TPG Inc. Paulson & Co. Fortress Investment Group
- Known for: CEO of P.F. Chang's (2020–2023); CEO of Red Lobster (2024–present)
- Title: 6th Chief Executive Officer of Red Lobster
- Term: August 2024–present
- Predecessor: Jonathan Tibus

Damola Adamolekun (born February 1989) is a Nigerian-American business executive and the current chief executive officer of Red Lobster Investor Holdings. He is the youngest CEO of Red Lobster and previously held experience in financial and operational restructuring, particularly as CEO of P. F. Chang's in the early 2020s.

== Early life and educational background ==
Damola Adamolekun was born in Nigeria in 1989 to Yoruba parents, a neurologist (father) and a pharmacist (mother). He spent his early childhood in Zimbabwe and the Netherlands before moving to Springfield, Illinois, with his family at the age of 9. His family later relocated to Columbia, Maryland, where he attended Wilde Lake High School. From a young age, Adamolekun exhibited an interest in business, opening his first stock portfolio at age 16.

Adamolekun holds a Bachelor of Arts in Economics and Political Science from Brown University, where he served as President of the Brown Investment Group and was a member of the university’s Ivy League champion football team. He later obtained an MBA from Harvard Business School, where he was a Portfolio Manager for the HBS Investment Club.

== Career ==
Adamolekun began his professional career as an Investment Banker at Goldman Sachs and later worked as a private equity associate at TPG Inc. He also held board positions at P.F. Chang's, Inday, NuLeaf, the National Restaurant Association, and International Tower Hill Mines.

=== P. F. Chang's ===
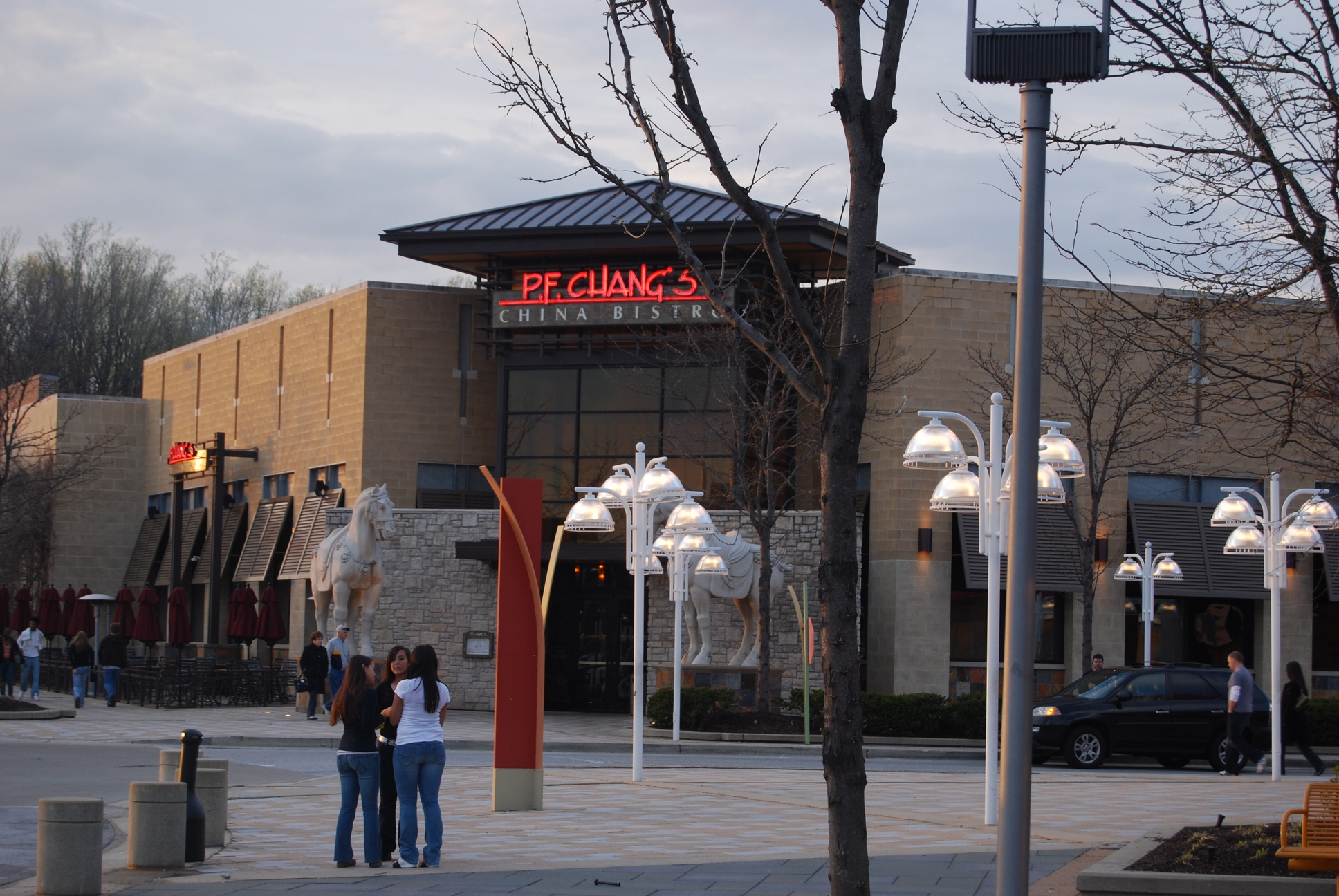
P. F. Chang's at The Mall in Columbia, Columbia, MD.

In 2017, after completing his MBA at Harvard Business School, Adamolekun joined Paulson & Co., an investment firm founded by hedge fund billionaire John Paulson. During his time at Paulson & Co., P. F. Chang’s was put up for sale, and Adamolekun pitched the investment idea to Paulson, which led to Paulson & Co. and TriArtisan Capital Advisors acquiring a controlling stake in P.F. Chang's in 2019. After the acquisition, Adamolekun joined the Board and became the company's Chief Strategy Officer.

In 2020, Adamolekun became P. F. Chang's first black CEO at the age of 31. During his tenure, the company launched P. F. Chang's To Go, a concept that led to the growth of the brand’s delivery business. During the COVID-19 pandemic, Adamolekun returned P. F. Chang's to profitability with a 31.7% increase in sales by 2021 and annual revenues of $1 billion. In 2023, Adamolekun stepped down as CEO of P. F. Chang’s after four years in the role but remained involved with the brand’s private equity owners.

=== Red Lobster ===
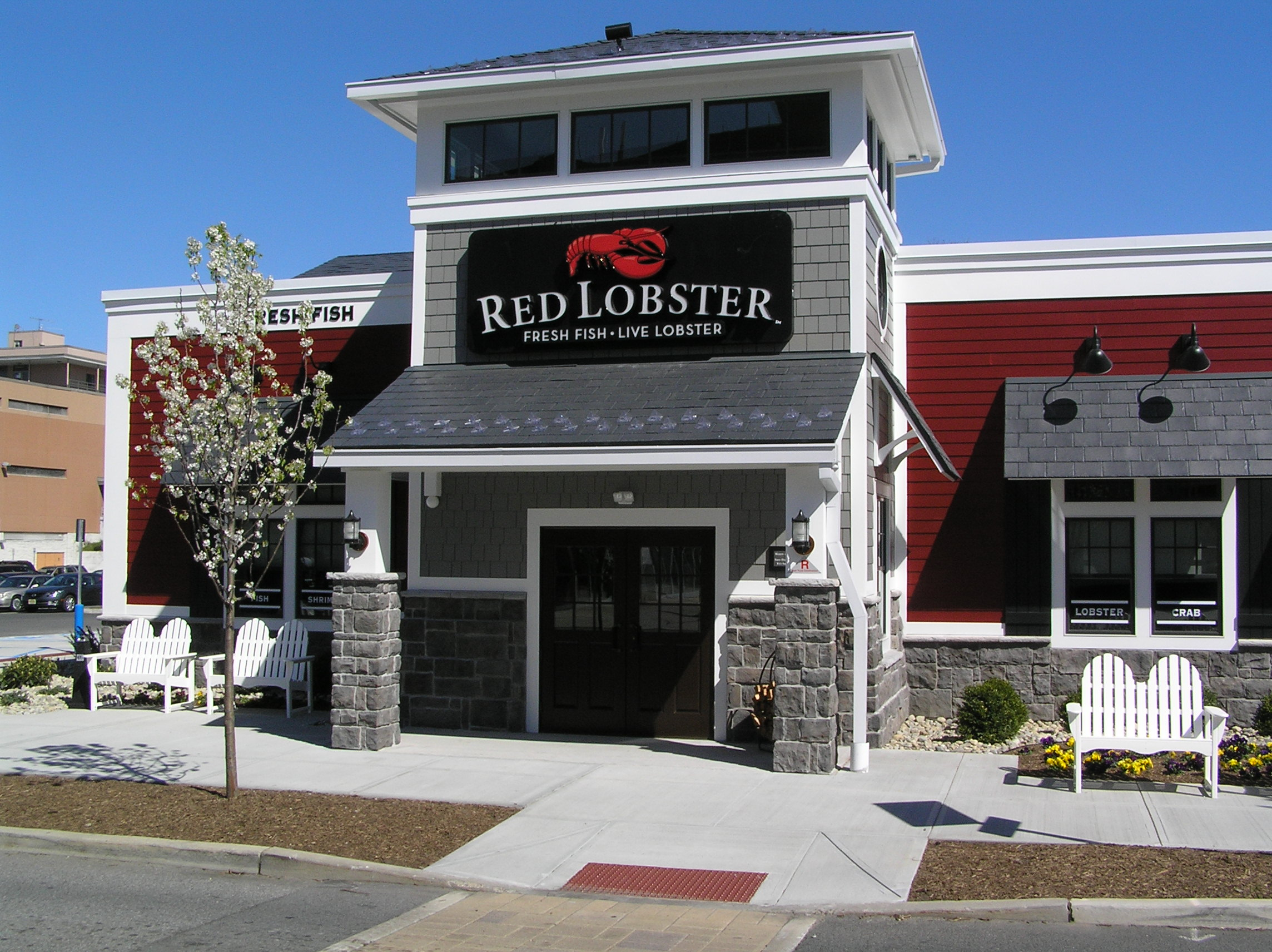
Red Lobster

In 2024, the Orlando-based seafood chain Red Lobster slipped towards bankruptcy, closing 93 locations and filing for Chapter 11 bankruptcy protection on May 20, 2024, with over $1 billion in debt. On June 14, 2024, it was reported that Fortress Investment Group, a Wall Street investment firm co-founded by Milwaukee Bucks co-owner Wesley Edens, was interested in acquiring the company.

Fortress Investment Group Logo

On August 26, 2024, Fortress appointed Adamolekun CEO of Red Lobster Investor Holdings LLC, making him the youngest CEO in the company’s history. Adamolekun stated that he wanted to lead Red Lobster’s turnaround because of its history as the "first really successful casual dining chain in America at scale", and that his approach to Red Lobster’s recovery would focus on incremental changes rather than a complete overhaul.

== Recognition and awards ==
- Top CEO of the Year The Rising Star –2021.
- Fortune 100 Most Powerful People–2024.
