= Khanyisile Motsa =

Mam Khanyi with her award from the Nelson Mandela Foundation

Khanyisile Motsa is a humanitarian working to improve living conditions for South African children.

Also known as Mam Khanyi, she founded Home of Hope for Girls (HoH) in Johannesburg in 2002 after opening her home to young girls fleeing prostitution and trafficking. HoH provides shelter for seventy-five girls and has helped thousands by working with the South African police and social services.

When Trevor Noah launched The Trevor Noah Foundation to help equip South African orphans and vulnerable youth with education and life skills, he invited Mam Khanyi to contribute as a panelist.

== Awards ==
- Nedbank Hero 2009 for Community Building
- Winner of the 2010 Feather Award in the Women’s National Community Builder and Humanitarian category
- 2010 Shoprite/Checkers Woman of the Year – Youth Movers
- The Rotary Clubs of Rosebank and Randburg award for Community Building.
- At the 2018 centenary celebration of Nelson Mandela’s life, The Nelson Mandela Foundation awarded Mam Khanyi as one of South Africa’s ‘Unsung Heroes’
- 2022 Winner of the Global Citizen Prize: Citizen Award South Africa, for her continued commitment and the impact of her organization on the lives of more than 200 rescued women and girls.
