= Grand Hyatt Seattle =

Hotel in Seattle, Washington, U.S.

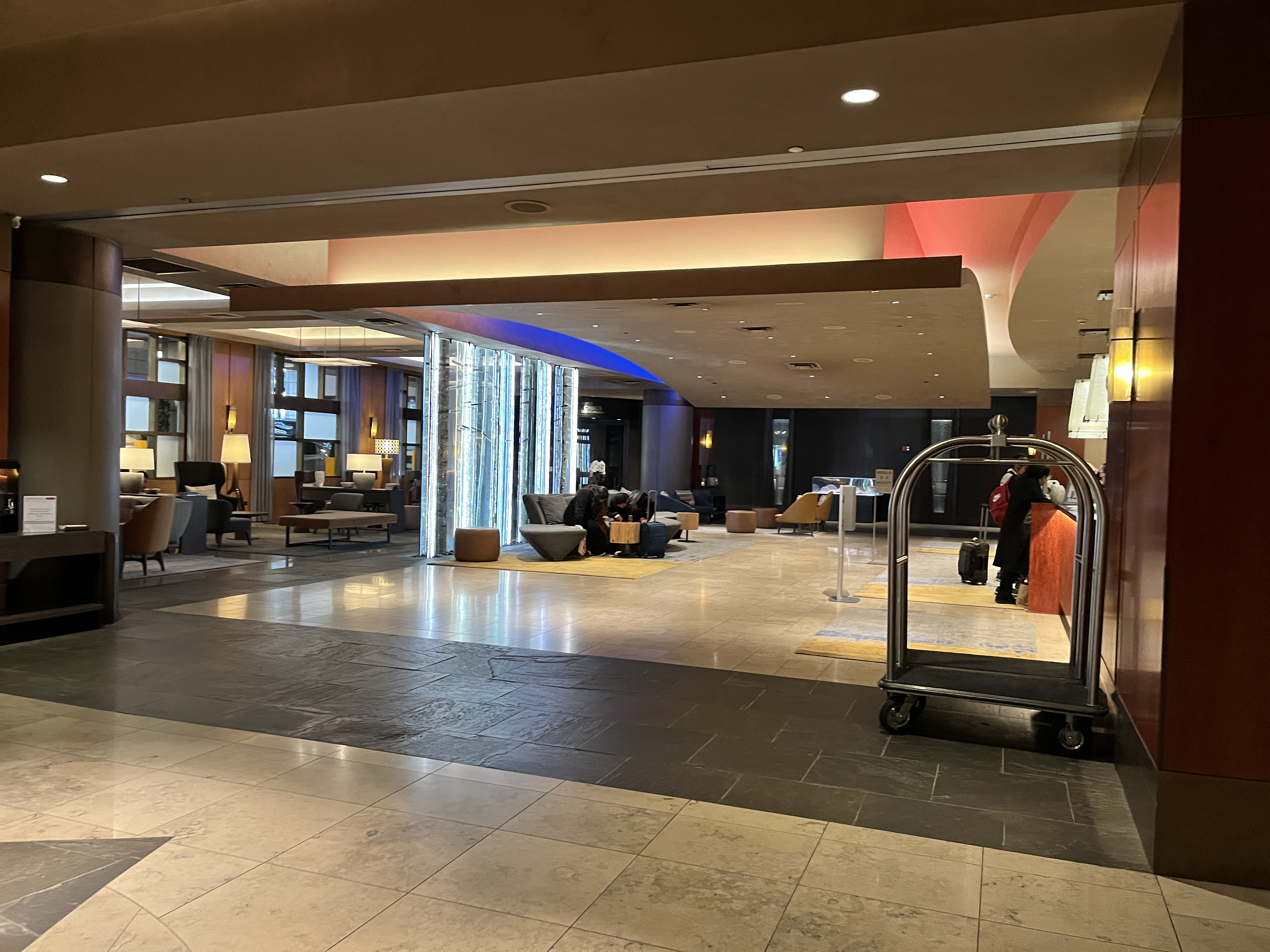
- Interior lobby, 2022
- Interactive map of the Grand Hyatt Seattle area

General information
- Location: Seattle, Washington, United States
- Coordinates: 47.6127°N 122.3334°W

Grand Hyatt Seattle is a hotel in Seattle, in the U.S. state of Washington. The 30-floor building was constructed in 2001 and renovated in 2014.

== Features ==
The 425-room hotel houses a Starbucks shop, a Ruth's Chris Steak House restaurant, as well as Ruth's Chris Lounge. Other amenities have included a health club with exercise equipment, a jacuzzi, and a sauna.

Sculptures have been installed outside the hotel, including one by Willem de Kooning and The Sculptor by Tom Otterness.

== History ==
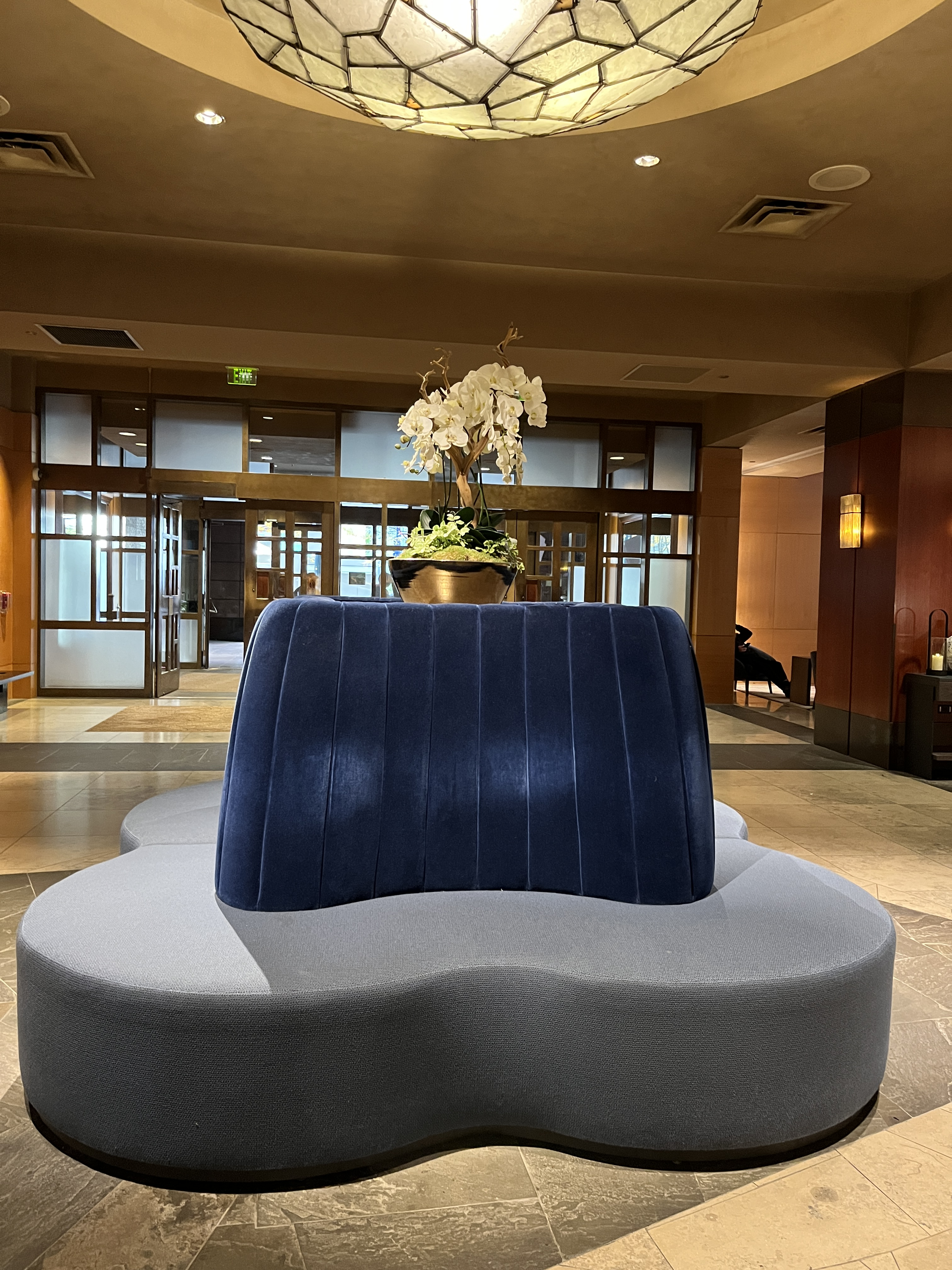
Interior lobby, 2022

In 2014, employees of Grand Hyatt Seattle and Hyatt at Olive 8 picketed at the hotel's front entrance over union rights. The hotel remained open during the COVID-19 pandemic.

== Reception ==
In 2016, PCMag included the Grand Hyatt Seattle in a selection of the city's best "wired" hotels. Fodor's has recommended the hotel for its location, views, large bathrooms, and on-site restaurants, but cited traffic noise and charges for Wi-Fi and select services in the business center as cons. Frommer's rates the hotel two out of three stars. The website included the Grand Hyatt Seattle in a 2006 overview of the "best bets for a place to stay" in the city and said, "Stylish without being trendy, this luxury downtown tower hotel provides not only the finest room amenities but also the best service." U.S. News & World Report has ranked the hotel eighth in downtown Seattle, twelfth in the city, number 17 in Washington, and number 748 in the U.S.
