= Cameron Mitchell Restaurants =

American restaurant company

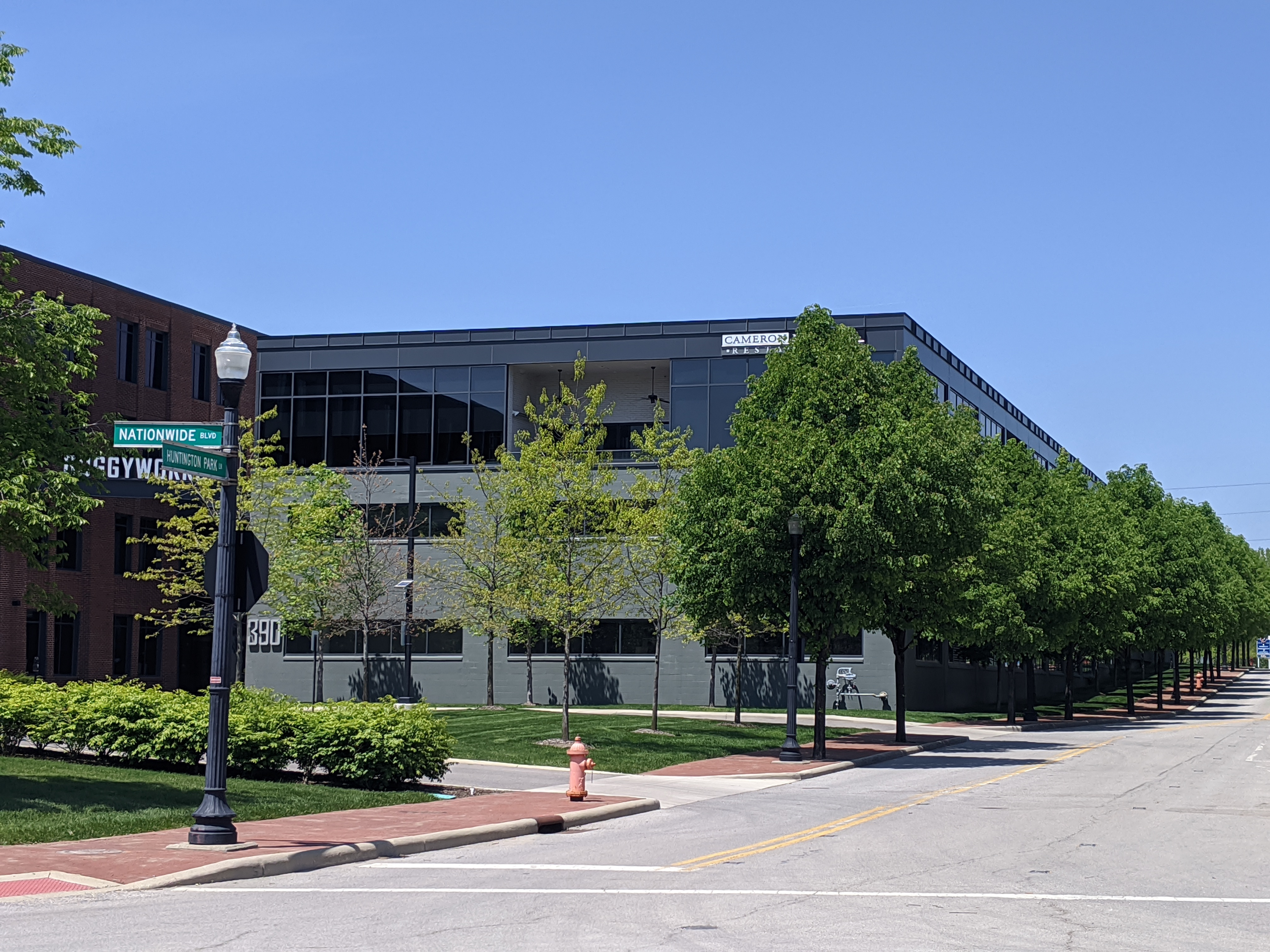
- Corporate offices
- Industry: Hospitality
- Founded: 1993; 33 years ago
- Founder: Cameron Mitchell
- Headquarters: Columbus, Ohio, United States
- Number of locations: 70 (49, 21 Rusty Bucket)
- Area served: Central Ohio; Beverly Hills, California; Boston; Chicago; Dallas; Denver; Detroit; Tampa, Florida; Indianapolis; Kansas City; New York City; Philadelphia; Phoenix, Arizona; Orlando, Florida; Washington D.C. Naples, Florida; Las Vegas
- Key people: Cameron Mitchell (Founder & CEO); David Miller (President & COO)
- Divisions: Ocean Prime+ 21 concepts
- Subsidiaries: Rusty Bucket Restaurant & Tavern; Buckeye Hospitality Construction
- Website: https://www.cameronmitchell.com

Cameron Mitchell Restaurants, LLC. is a restaurant group headquartered in Columbus, Ohio. It owns restaurants under various names, many of which are located in Central Ohio.

While remaining independent and privately held, Cameron Mitchell Restaurants has grown to 50 restaurant locations across the country from Beverly Hills to New York City, and 20 different concepts in 15 states and the District of Columbia, including the steakhouse and seafood restaurant, Ocean Prime. Cameron Mitchell also runs a separate catering company, Cameron Mitchell Premier Events.

The group's Ocean Prime concept opened in Troy, Michigan in June 2008 and has locations in Columbus (under the name Mitchell's Ocean Club) and in seventeen other cities across the United States. The company also manages and co-owns a sister company, Rusty Bucket Restaurant & Tavern.

The group formerly owned the Mitchell's Steakhouse and Mitchell's Fish Market brands, but sold both of these concepts along with one Cameron's Steakhouse location to Ruth's Chris in February 2008.

== Cameron Mitchell Restaurants ==
- The Avenue Steak Tavern
  - Dublin, Ohio
  - Grandview Heights, Ohio
- The Barn at Rocky Fork Creek
  - Gahanna, Ohio
- Butcher & Rose
  - Downtown Columbus, Ohio
- Budd Dairy Food Hall
  - Italian Village, Columbus, Ohio
- Cameron's American Bistro
  - Worthington, Ohio
- Cameron Mitchell Premier Events
  - Columbus, Ohio
- Cap City Fine Diner & Bar
  - Bridge Park, Dublin, Ohio
  - Gahanna, Ohio
  - Grandview Heights, Ohio
- Cento
  - German Village, Columbus, Ohio
- Del Mar Naples
  - Naples, Florida
- Del Mar Columbus
  - Easton Town Center, Columbus, Ohio
- SoCal Kitchen
  - Short North, Columbus, Ohio
- The Guild House
  - Short North, Columbus, Ohio
- Hudson 29 Kitchen + Drink
  - New Albany, Ohio
  - Upper Arlington, Ohio
- Lincoln Social Rooftop
  - Short North, Columbus, Ohio
- Marcella's Ristorante
  - Polaris Fashion Place, Columbus, Ohio
  - Short North, Columbus, Ohio
- Martini Modern Italian
  - Arena District, Columbus, Ohio
- Mitchell's Ocean Club
  - Easton Town Center, Columbus, Ohio
- Molly Woo's Asian Bistro
  - Polaris Fashion Place, Columbus, Ohio
- Ocean Prime
  - Beverly Hills, California
  - Boston, Massachusetts
  - Chicago, Illinois
  - Dallas, Texas
  - Denver, Colorado - Larimer Square
  - Denver, Colorado - Tech Center
  - Detroit, Michigan
  - Indianapolis, Indiana
  - Kansas City, Missouri
  - Las Vegas, Nevada
  - Naples, Florida
  - New York City, New York
  - Orlando, Florida
  - Philadelphia, Pennsylvania
  - Phoenix, Arizona
  - Tampa, Florida
  - Washington, D.C.
- The Pearl Restaurant, Tavern & Oyster Room
  - Short North, Columbus, Ohio
  - Dublin, Ohio
  - Tampa, Florida
- Prime Social Rooftop
  - Kansas City, Missouri
- Valentina's
  - Bridge Park, Dublin, Ohio

Upcoming Locations

- Big Rock Italian Chophouse – 2025
  - Birmingham, Michigan
- Cap City Fine Diner & Bar – Fall 2024
  - Cincinnati, Ohio
- Ocean Prime
  - Sarasota, Florida – 2024
  - Nashville, Tennessee – 2025
  - Ft. Lauderdale – 2025
- Rooftop Concept (Name TBA) - 2024
  - Naples, Florida

== Cameron Mitchell ==
Cameron Mitchell is president and founder of Cameron Mitchell Restaurants. He gained notoriety in the restaurant industry in 2008, when two of the company's concepts: Mitchell's/Columbus Fish Market and Mitchell's/Cameron's Steakhouse—a total of 22 units—sold to Ruth's Hospitality Group for $92 million.

Mitchell is a 1986 graduate of the Culinary Institute of America, where he was the first alumnus to hold the position of Chairman Emeritus of the Board of Trustees. He is also the school's largest alumni donor.

In 1993, Mitchell began Cameron Mitchell Restaurants by opening its first concept, Cameron's American Bistro. As a result of the development of several new concepts and expansion of its more popular concepts, Cameron Mitchell Restaurants became a 33-unit, multi-concept operation with locations in nine states. Before the sale of its two biggest concepts in 2008, the company's annual sales surpassed $120 million.
