= Ocean Prime =

Steakhouse and seafood restaurant chain

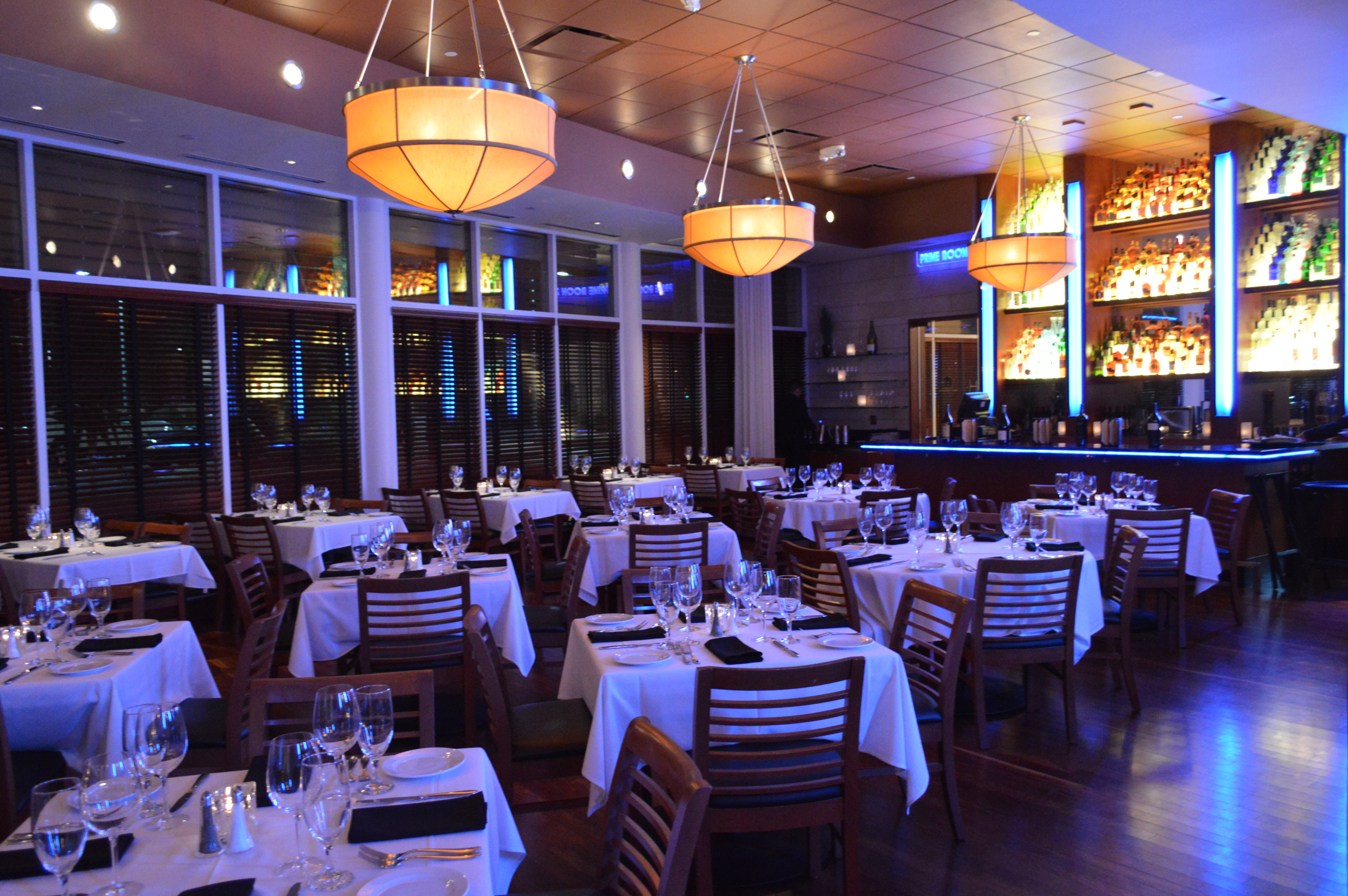
Ocean Prime in Phoenix, Arizona

Ocean Prime is a steakhouse and seafood restaurant concept owned by Cameron Mitchell Restaurants, consisting of 18 restaurants in 14 states plus Washington, D.C. Mitchell's Ocean Club opened in August 2006, starting the Ocean Prime brand in Columbus, Ohio, and the first Ocean Prime outside of Ohio opened in Troy, Michigan in June 2008. Other locations include Beverly Hills, Boston, Chicago, Dallas, Denver (Tech Center and Larimer Square), Indianapolis, Kansas City, Las Vegas, Naples, New York City, Orlando, Philadelphia, Phoenix, Tampa and Washington, D.C. Ocean Prime Sarasota is listed among the chain's current locations, and Ocean Prime Nashville opened in April 2026.

== Restaurants ==
=== Mitchell's Ocean Club ===
- Easton Town Center, Columbus, Ohio

=== Ocean Prime ===
- Beverly Hills
- Boston
- Chicago
- Dallas
- Denver - Larimer Square
- Denver - Tech Center
- Detroit
- Fort Lauderdale
- Indianapolis
- Kansas City
- Las Vegas
- Naples
- New York City
- Orlando
- Philadelphia
- Phoenix
- Tampa
- Washington, D.C.

== Awards ==
- Nation’s Restaurant News: 100 Under 100 – Ocean Prime
- Nation’s Restaurant News: Top 250 of Top 500 list – Ocean Prime
- Nation’s Restaurant News: 2023 America’s Top 25 Restaurant Groups – Cameron Mitchell Restaurants
- Ernst & Young: 2023 Entrepreneur of the Year East Central Lifetime Achievement Award – Cameron Mitchell
- OpenTable: 100 Most Popular Restaurants for Outdoor Dining in America 2023 – Ocean Prime Tampa
- OpenTable: Top 100 Restaurants in the U.S. 2022 – Ocean Prime Tampa
- OpenTable: 2022 Diner’s Choice Awards – Ocean Prime Beverly Hills, Boston, Chicago, Dallas, Denver Larimer Square, Indianapolis, Kansas City, Naples, New York, Orlando, Philadelphia, Phoenix, Tampa, Troy, Washington, D.C., Denver Tech Center and Mitchell’s Ocean Club
- Restaurant Business: Technomic's 2022 and 2023 Top 500 Chain Restaurant Report – Ocean Prime
- FSR: 2022 NextGen25 – Ocean Prime
- OpenTable: 2022 Most Romantic Restaurants in the Country – Ocean Prime Denver - Larimer Square
- TripAdvisor: 2022 #1 Highest Rated Seafood Restaurant in NYC – Ocean Prime New York
- Tampa Magazine: 2021 Best Restaurants: Best Seafood Restaurant – Ocean Prime Tampa
- Orlando Magazine: 2021 Annual Dining Awards: Best Place for a Business Dinner, Best Cocktails, Best Service, Best Appetizers, Best Wine – Ocean Prime Orlando
- USA Today 10Best: Best Steakhouses in Denver – Ocean Prime Denver - Larimer Square
- Phoenix Magazine: Best Restaurants in North Phoenix 2021 – Ocean Prime Phoenix
- Dallas Observer: 2020 Best of Dallas: Best Bartender, April McEuen – Ocean Prime Dallas
- Gulfshore Life: 2020 Best of the Gulfshore: Best Private Room – Ocean Prime Naples

== See also ==
- List of seafood restaurants
