= 1924 United States presidential election in Indiana =

- November 4, 1924
- Turnout: 70.7% ▼0.3 pp

Nominee	Calvin Coolidge	John W. Davis	Robert M. La Follette
Party	Republican	Democratic	Progressive
Home state	Massachusetts	West Virginia	Wisconsin
Running mate	Charles G. Dawes	Charles W. Bryan	Burton K. Wheeler
Electoral vote	15	0	0
Popular vote	703,042	492,245	71,700
Percentage	55.25%	38.69%	5.64%
County results
Coolidge
40–50%
50–60%
60–70%
Davis
40–50%
50–60%
60–70%
President before election
Calvin Coolidge
Republican
Elected President
Calvin Coolidge
Republican

A presidential election was held in Indiana on November 4, 1924, as part of the 1924 United States presidential election. The Republican ticket of the incumbent president of the United States Calvin Coolidge and the director of the Bureau of the Budget Charles G. Dawes defeated the Democratic ticket of the former U.S. ambassador to the United Kingdom John W. Davis and the governor of Nebraska Charles W. Bryan. The Progressive ticket of the senior U.S. senator from Wisconsin Robert M. La Follette and the junior U.S. senator from Montana Burton K. Wheeler finished a distant third. Coolidge defeated Davis and La Follette in the national election with 382 electoral votes.

The Indiana Ku Klux Klan was the subject of serious controversy and played an active role in the campaign. The Klan intervened successfully in the state's Republican primary and dominated the Republican state convention, which nominated a slate of candidates endorsed by Grand Dragon D. C. Stephenson. Coolidge attempted to distance himself from the Klan by campaigning separately from the state Republican candidates, but was endorsed by the Fiery Cross, the official publication of the Klan in Indiana. Davis and the state Democratic ticket denounced the Klan and campaigned for votes from African-Americans, who were a traditionally Republican constituency; prominent Black community leaders formed the Independent Voters League to encourage Black Hoosiers to abandon the Republican Party. Despite his indifferent response to the Klan's outreach, regression analysis indicates Coolidge received the overwhelming support of Indiana Klansmen, including those who had previously supported Democrats. Klansmen were 10 percent more likely to support La Follette than the general population, despite his poor showing in the state, while Davis polled between 70 and 80 percent of the Black vote in Indianapolis.

== Primary elections ==
=== Republican Party ===
Indiana Republican primary, May 6, 1924
Party	Candidate	Votes	%
Republican	Calvin Coolidge	310,618	54.29
Republican	Hiram Johnson	261,566	45.71
Total votes		572,184	100.00

=== Democratic Party ===
No candidates filed to run in the Indiana Democratic primary, and consequently no primary election was held.

== General election ==
=== Results ===
Indiana chose 15 electors on a statewide general ticket. State law required voters to elect each member of the Electoral College individually, rather than as a group. This sometimes resulted in small differences in the number of votes cast for electors pledged to the same presidential candidate, if some voters did not vote for all the electors nominated by a party. The following table quotes the official returns published by the secretary of state of Indiana, which list the votes for the first elector on each ticket.

1924 United States presidential election in Indiana
Party	Candidate	Votes	%	±%
Republican	Calvin Coolidge Charles G. Dawes	703,042	55.25	▲0.11
Democratic	John W. Davis Charles W. Bryan	492,245	38.69	▼1.80
Progressive	Robert M. La Follette Burton K. Wheeler	71,700	5.64	▲5.64
Prohibition	Herman P. Faris Marie C. Brehm	4,416	0.35	▼0.72
Workers	William Z. Foster Benjamin Gitlow	987	0.08	▲0.08
Total votes		1,272,390	100.00	

=== Results by county ===
1924 United States presidential election in Indiana by county
County	Calvin Coolidge Republican		John W. Davis Democratic		Robert M. La Follette Progressive		Herman P. Faris Prohibition		William Z. Foster Workers		Margin		Total
County	Votes	%	Votes	%	Votes	%	Votes	%	Votes	%	Votes	%	Total
Adams	3,330	41.34%	4,300	53.38%	391	4.85%	33	0.41%	1	0.01%	-970	-12.04%	8,055
Allen	25,207	54.12%	17,244	37.03%	3,889	8.35%	125	0.27%	108	0.23%	7,963	17.10%	46,573
Bartholomew	6,606	56.62%	4,760	40.80%	272	2.33%	30	0.26%	0	0.00%	1,846	15.82%	11,668
Benton	3,250	58.14%	2,104	37.64%	216	3.86%	19	0.34%	1	0.02%	1,146	20.50%	5,590
Blackford	3,553	51.10%	3,094	44.50%	264	3.80%	40	0.58%	2	0.03%	459	6.60%	6,953
Boone	6,256	52.57%	5,466	45.93%	156	1.31%	18	0.15%	4	0.03%	790	6.64%	11,900
Brown	756	36.93%	1,229	60.04%	47	2.30%	14	0.68%	1	0.05%	-473	-23.11%	2,047
Carroll	4,543	53.52%	3,660	43.11%	254	2.99%	31	0.37%	1	0.01%	883	10.40%	8,489
Cass	9,939	55.89%	5,276	29.67%	2,480	13.95%	43	0.24%	45	0.25%	4,663	26.22%	17,783
Clark	5,944	51.70%	5,218	45.38%	315	2.74%	21	0.18%	0	0.00%	726	6.31%	11,498
Clay	5,955	48.86%	5,349	43.88%	843	6.92%	42	0.34%	0	0.00%	606	4.97%	12,189
Clinton	7,469	53.88%	6,070	43.79%	261	1.88%	57	0.41%	5	0.04%	1,399	10.09%	13,862
Crawford	1,917	43.08%	2,384	53.57%	123	2.76%	26	0.58%	0	0.00%	-467	-10.49%	4,450
Daviess	6,427	51.42%	5,558	44.46%	488	3.90%	25	0.20%	2	0.02%	869	6.95%	12,500
Dearborn	4,588	48.11%	4,330	45.41%	582	6.10%	35	0.37%	1	0.01%	258	2.71%	9,536
Decatur	4,907	52.94%	4,092	44.15%	246	2.65%	22	0.24%	2	0.02%	815	8.79%	9,269
DeKalb	6,093	54.63%	4,133	37.05%	872	7.82%	56	0.50%	0	0.00%	1,960	17.57%	11,154
Delaware	14,411	61.74%	7,830	33.55%	767	3.29%	299	1.28%	33	0.14%	6,581	28.20%	23,340
Dubois	2,708	30.53%	5,651	63.71%	504	5.68%	5	0.06%	2	0.02%	-2,943	-33.18%	8,870
Elkhart	13,096	64.50%	4,729	23.29%	2,343	11.54%	123	0.61%	13	0.06%	8,367	41.21%	20,304
Fayette	5,284	62.16%	2,940	34.58%	244	2.87%	31	0.36%	2	0.02%	2,344	27.57%	8,501
Floyd	6,733	46.50%	6,971	48.15%	738	5.10%	29	0.20%	8	0.06%	-238	-1.64%	14,479
Fountain	4,796	51.28%	4,282	45.78%	249	2.66%	18	0.19%	8	0.09%	514	5.50%	9,353
Franklin	3,296	44.43%	3,915	52.78%	190	2.56%	15	0.20%	2	0.03%	-619	-8.34%	7,418
Fulton	4,329	55.53%	3,244	41.61%	192	2.46%	21	0.27%	10	0.13%	1,085	13.92%	7,796
Gibson	7,100	49.62%	6,149	42.98%	993	6.94%	61	0.43%	5	0.03%	951	6.65%	14,308
Grant	11,173	55.10%	7,086	34.95%	1,884	9.29%	120	0.59%	13	0.06%	4,087	20.16%	20,276
Greene	6,670	45.93%	5,966	41.09%	1,832	12.62%	53	0.36%	0	0.00%	704	4.85%	14,521
Hamilton	7,463	64.91%	3,785	32.92%	192	1.67%	58	0.50%	0	0.00%	3,678	31.99%	11,498
Hancock	4,063	47.27%	4,364	50.77%	113	1.31%	54	0.63%	1	0.01%	-301	-3.50%	8,595
Harrison	3,896	48.31%	4,005	49.67%	147	1.82%	16	0.20%	0	0.00%	-109	-1.35%	8,064
Hendricks	5,766	61.02%	3,489	36.92%	168	1.78%	23	0.24%	3	0.03%	2,277	24.10%	9,449
Henry	8,800	60.85%	5,376	37.18%	205	1.42%	72	0.50%	8	0.06%	3,424	23.68%	14,461
Howard	10,438	60.05%	5,451	31.36%	1,378	7.93%	116	0.67%	0	0.00%	4,987	28.69%	17,383
Huntington	7,437	51.42%	5,506	38.07%	1,446	10.00%	70	0.48%	3	0.02%	1,931	13.35%	14,462
Jackson	4,187	41.63%	5,332	53.02%	506	5.03%	31	0.31%	1	0.01%	-1,145	-11.39%	10,057
Jasper	3,679	64.36%	1,744	30.51%	281	4.92%	12	0.21%	0	0.00%	1,935	33.85%	5,716
Jay	5,753	52.83%	4,812	44.19%	269	2.47%	53	0.49%	3	0.03%	941	8.64%	10,890
Jefferson	5,192	55.50%	3,914	41.84%	221	2.36%	25	0.27%	3	0.03%	1,278	13.66%	9,355
Jennings	3,506	54.41%	2,730	42.36%	184	2.86%	22	0.34%	2	0.03%	776	12.04%	6,444
Johnson	4,954	50.77%	4,699	48.16%	90	0.92%	13	0.13%	1	0.01%	255	2.61%	9,757
Knox	8,493	44.31%	8,603	44.88%	1,986	10.36%	57	0.30%	29	0.15%	-110	-0.57%	19,168
Kosciusko	6,819	58.33%	4,384	37.50%	419	3.58%	64	0.55%	4	0.03%	2,435	20.83%	11,690
LaGrange	3,081	63.34%	1,566	32.20%	203	4.17%	13	0.27%	1	0.02%	1,515	31.15%	4,864
Lake	30,990	64.61%	10,918	22.76%	5,822	12.14%	150	0.31%	88	0.18%	20,072	41.84%	47,968
LaPorte	11,597	61.22%	5,214	27.52%	2,078	10.97%	29	0.15%	25	0.13%	6,383	33.70%	18,943
Lawrence	7,438	60.70%	4,414	36.02%	376	3.07%	24	0.20%	2	0.02%	3,024	24.68%	12,254
Madison	18,447	57.64%	12,061	37.69%	1,282	4.01%	187	0.58%	26	0.08%	6,386	19.95%	32,003
Marion	95,135	59.13%	59,498	36.98%	5,842	3.63%	230	0.14%	175	0.11%	35,637	22.15%	160,880
Marshall	5,354	53.22%	4,277	42.51%	377	3.75%	49	0.49%	3	0.03%	1,077	10.71%	10,060
Martin	2,470	46.77%	2,669	50.54%	134	2.54%	7	0.13%	1	0.02%	-199	-3.77%	5,281
Miami	6,796	51.49%	4,976	37.70%	1,335	10.11%	65	0.49%	27	0.20%	1,820	13.79%	13,199
Monroe	6,247	55.22%	4,689	41.45%	348	3.08%	24	0.21%	4	0.04%	1,558	13.77%	11,312
Montgomery	8,366	58.52%	5,708	39.93%	186	1.30%	31	0.22%	4	0.03%	2,658	18.59%	14,295
Morgan	5,328	55.58%	4,042	42.17%	184	1.92%	31	0.32%	1	0.01%	1,286	13.42%	9,586
Newton	2,705	60.37%	1,523	33.99%	240	5.36%	12	0.27%	1	0.02%	1,182	26.38%	4,481
Noble	5,793	55.72%	4,163	40.04%	398	3.83%	35	0.34%	8	0.08%	1,630	15.68%	10,397
Ohio	989	46.98%	1,058	50.26%	44	2.09%	14	0.67%	0	0.00%	-69	-3.28%	2,105
Orange	4,538	56.04%	3,374	41.66%	161	1.99%	23	0.28%	2	0.02%	1,164	14.37%	8,098
Owen	2,627	47.41%	2,670	48.19%	225	4.06%	18	0.32%	1	0.02%	-43	-0.78%	5,541
Parke	4,877	59.12%	2,898	35.13%	415	5.03%	35	0.42%	24	0.29%	1,979	23.99%	8,249
Perry	3,240	44.30%	3,895	53.25%	170	2.32%	9	0.12%	0	0.00%	-655	-8.96%	7,314
Pike	3,885	48.78%	3,604	45.25%	442	5.55%	22	0.28%	12	0.15%	281	3.53%	7,965
Porter	5,613	67.76%	1,640	19.80%	1,009	12.18%	22	0.27%	0	0.00%	3,973	47.96%	8,284
Posey	4,173	48.82%	4,115	48.14%	227	2.66%	29	0.34%	4	0.05%	58	0.68%	8,548
Pulaski	2,725	55.03%	1,953	39.44%	253	5.11%	12	0.24%	9	0.18%	772	15.59%	4,952
Putnam	4,930	49.14%	4,759	47.44%	326	3.25%	16	0.16%	1	0.01%	171	1.70%	10,032
Randolph	7,397	64.10%	3,768	32.65%	262	2.27%	108	0.94%	4	0.03%	3,629	31.45%	11,539
Ripley	4,694	49.02%	4,257	44.45%	605	6.32%	18	0.19%	2	0.02%	437	4.56%	9,576
Rush	5,958	62.58%	3,415	35.87%	110	1.16%	36	0.38%	2	0.02%	2,543	26.71%	9,521
Scott	1,532	44.59%	1,824	53.08%	64	1.86%	15	0.44%	1	0.03%	-292	-8.50%	3,436
Shelby	6,664	51.52%	5,976	46.20%	228	1.76%	67	0.52%	1	0.01%	688	5.32%	12,936
Spencer	4,395	48.59%	4,409	48.75%	211	2.33%	20	0.22%	10	0.11%	-14	-0.15%	9,045
St. Joseph	23,682	57.65%	15,056	36.65%	2,202	5.36%	108	0.26%	34	0.08%	8,626	21.00%	41,082
Starke	2,329	53.00%	1,555	35.39%	501	11.40%	8	0.18%	1	0.02%	774	17.61%	4,394
Steuben	4,046	68.52%	1,610	27.27%	216	3.66%	32	0.54%	1	0.02%	2,436	41.25%	5,905
Sullivan	5,139	42.64%	5,213	43.25%	1,610	13.36%	71	0.59%	20	0.17%	-74	-0.61%	12,053
Switzerland	2,346	48.29%	2,414	49.69%	73	1.50%	25	0.51%	0	0.00%	-68	-1.40%	4,858
Tippecanoe	12,161	58.40%	7,619	36.59%	976	4.69%	56	0.27%	11	0.05%	4,542	21.81%	20,823
Tipton	4,183	51.33%	3,660	44.91%	261	3.20%	46	0.56%	0	0.00%	523	6.42%	8,150
Union	1,907	58.77%	1,284	39.57%	40	1.23%	13	0.40%	1	0.03%	623	19.20%	3,245
Vanderburgh	25,907	55.29%	17,186	36.68%	3,640	7.77%	79	0.17%	44	0.09%	8,721	18.61%	46,856
Vermillion	4,489	49.14%	2,779	30.42%	1,800	19.70%	43	0.47%	24	0.26%	1,710	18.72%	9,135
Vigo	19,545	52.74%	12,999	35.08%	4,320	11.66%	146	0.39%	49	0.13%	6,546	17.66%	37,059
Wabash	7,277	60.44%	4,054	33.67%	610	5.07%	89	0.74%	10	0.08%	3,223	26.77%	12,040
Warren	3,035	69.66%	1,150	26.39%	159	3.65%	12	0.28%	1	0.02%	1,885	43.26%	4,357
Warrick	4,437	51.49%	3,797	44.06%	343	3.98%	19	0.22%	21	0.24%	640	7.43%	8,617
Washington	3,479	46.37%	3,942	52.55%	64	0.85%	16	0.21%	1	0.01%	-463	-6.17%	7,502
Wayne	11,487	59.75%	6,211	32.31%	1,445	7.52%	81	0.42%	1	0.01%	5,276	27.44%	19,225
Wells	3,932	44.92%	4,537	51.83%	210	2.40%	73	0.83%	2	0.02%	-605	-6.91%	8,754
White	4,475	56.36%	3,138	39.52%	305	3.84%	22	0.28%	0	0.00%	1,337	16.84%	7,940
Whitley	4,420	54.84%	3,484	43.23%	128	1.59%	28	0.35%	0	0.00%	936	11.61%	8,060
TOTAL	703,042	55.25%	492,245	38.69%	71,700	5.64%	4,416	0.35%	987	0.08%	210,797	16.57%	1,272,390

== See also ==
- United States presidential elections in Indiana

== Bibliography ==
- Congressional Quarterly (1985). Congressional Quarterly's Guide to U.S. Elections (2nd ed.). Washington D.C.: Congressional Quarterly. ISBN 978-0-87187-339-2.
- Giffin, William W. (June 1983). "The Political Realignment of Black Voters in Indianapolis, 1924". Indiana Magazine of History. 79 (2): 158. JSTOR 27790698.
- Indiana (1925). Year Book of the State of Indiana for the Year 1924. Indianapolis: Legislative Reference Bureau.
- Madison, James H. (2016). Indiana through Tradition and Change: A History of the Hoosier State and Its People, 1920–1945. Indianapolis: Indiana Historical Society.
- Madison, James H. (1986). The Indiana Way: A State History. Bloomington: Indiana University Press.
- McVeigh, Rory (2009). The Rise of the Ku Klux Klan: Right-Wing Movements and National Politics. Minneapolis: University of Minnesota Press.
- Moore, Leonard J. (1991). Citizen Klansmen: The Ku Klux Klan in Indiana, 1921–1928. Chapel Hill: University of North Carolina Press.
- Petersen, Svend (1963). A Statistical History of the American Presidential Elections. New York: Frederick Ungar Publishing Company. LCCN 62-21786.
- Spencer, William W.; Tennant, Maurice E.; Lesh, Ulysses S., eds. (1924). Election Laws of Indiana [...]. Indianapolis: State Board of Election Commissioners.
