= Ku Klux Klan auxiliaries =

American white supremacist hate groups

Ku Klux Klan auxiliaries are organized groups that supplement, but do not directly integrate with the Ku Klux Klan. These auxiliaries include: Women of the Ku Klux Klan, The Jr. Ku Klux Klan, The Tri-K Girls, the American Crusaders, The Royal Riders of the Red Robe, The Ku Klux balla, and the Klan's Colored Man auxiliary.

The second iteration of the Ku Klux Klan emerged in the 1920s and was officially branded as "the Knights of the Ku Klux Klan." Its membership was restricted to American-born white, Protestant males over the age of 18. There are also organized Ku Klux Klan sanctioned auxiliary chapters across the Atlantic spread throughout European countries, in French-Canada, and Mexican cities. It originates from the United States.

== Background ==
The Ku Klux Klan of the 1920s existed during a Progressive Era, a period of great optimism in the ability of people to improve society. During this period, some believed that eugenics could improve society by increasing the desirable characteristics of the population thus reducing crime, poverty and other social problems.

The 1920s were also characterized by profound social changes that disturbed many of America's largely rural, white, Protestant population. They feared the potential power and influence of: African Americans, Southern Europeans, Roman Catholics, Jews, Bolshevists, and potential and leftist labor unions. The Klan saw itself as defending American culture against dangerous foreigners and their ideas. It carried the American flag rather than the Confederate flag that later followers adopted.

This group believed that it was defending traditional American values; however, it often violated some of those values. Drinking alcoholic beverages was suddenly disdained publicly as a symbol of southern Europeans, Catholics and Jews. They not only strongly supported national prohibition of alcohol, but actively enforced it, sometimes with violence.

== Women ==
The Women of the Ku Klux Klan auxiliary, commonly known as the WKKK, was open to white, Protestant, American-born women "of good character" over the age of 18 who owed no allegiance to any foreign government or sect, such as Catholicism, Socialism, and Communism. It is estimated to have had over one million members, a quarter of whom lived in Indiana. Women made up almost half of the total Klan membership in Indiana, but in other states, they remained a tiny minority. These women were drawn to the Klan by claims that membership would ensure that white Protestant women would gain women's rights, as well as the opportunity to socially connect.

The founding of a women's auxiliary of the Klan was modeled on an earlier group of organized women calling themselves the Ladies of the Invisible Empire. Chapters were founded throughout the country with the Portland, Oregon chapter initiating more than one thousand women into their order in a single month in 1922. Initiation into these chapters required the women to detail their family, religious, and political background, as well as swear allegiance to Christianity and the principles of "pure Americanism". Unsure about the competition that the Ladies of the Invisible Empire and other women's organizations would create, the Klan promoted the idea of a single women's auxiliary, now known as the formal women of the Ku Klux Klan. The Klan felt that by including women in their political agenda, women's suffrage could not only be safeguarded, but could also encourage development of other women's legal rights, while working to preserve white, Protestant supremacy. The women of the Klan were to be assistants to the Klansmen in their 100% American mission. Despite the group’s mission to preserve traditional American family values, many of the women who joined did so against the wishes of their families and husbands, on occasion leading to conflict. Furthermore, not all Klansmen were in favor of officially including women within their group. Some felt that allowing women to be involved in the political realm, including allowing them to vote, would foster masculine boldness and independence and depreciate the decency of womanhood. As a result, some women felt alienated, and in 1922 they wrote letters to the editor of The Fiery Cross protesting their exclusion from the Klan. The wives of Klan members were not always happy staying at home with the children and wanted to be involved in the new white Protestant movement along with their husbands.

Women were recruited into the Women's Ku Klux Klan by hired female kleagles, who used the same campaigning methods as their male counterparts. Recruitment was conducted through social contact using personal, family, and work connections as well as through existing organizations. Open meetings were also held for the politically inactive and women currently not in Klan families. In four months, the Women's Ku Klux Klan had successfully doubled its previous membership, now bringing the total to 250,000 women. By November 1923, thirty-six states included female chapters of the Ku Klux Klan.

There were a number of female Klan auxiliary organizations in the 1920s before the foundation of the official Women of the Ku Klux Klan. These groups included Kamelia, Ladies of the Invisible Empire, Ladies of the Invisible Eye, Dixie Protestant Women's League, Grand League of Protestant Women, White American Protestants, Queens of the Golden Mask, and Hooded Ladies of the Mystic Den

== Royal Riders of the Red Robe ==
The Royal Riders of the Red Robe was open to English-speaking people who were "Anglo-Saxon" but not technically native-born Americans. Many branches of the Royal Riders were separated only by title. Some would even share meetings, offices and perform similar rituals. The Royal Riders were even listed in the Klan's Pacific Northwest Domain Directory. The Royal Riders stretched beyond the Northwestern United States, and even had branches in British Columbia, Vancouver and Victoria.

== KKK Kid Klans ==
The origins of the Ku Klux Klan Kid Klans dates to 1924 when a mass baptism was performed which included a commitment to a set of principals called Americanism. Based on eye-witness reports, ten children were encircled by some of fifty men all wearing white robes. The baptism included a promise to God and a vow to religiously raise the children of the KKK. The meaning of the vow is to dedicate the children to a lifetime upholding of segregation, bigotry, and suppression. The children christened were few in number compared to those who participated in the Klan and its auxiliary organizations.

The Kid Klans are the following: Junior Ku Klux Klan, Tri-K-Klub, and Ku Klux Kiddies. The Junior Ku Klux Klan originated in Lykens, Pennsylvania where the group announced its presence by blowing a horn and lighting a letter “J” on fire next to a burning cross. The Junior Ku Klux Klan was for teenage boys and became so popular that it expanded across fifteen states. The Tri-K-Klub was for teenage girls and was based on the women's group, also known as the WKKK. Members of the Tri-K-Klub learned a pledge song that is the following: “Beneath this flag that waves above/This cross that lights our way/You’ll always find a sister’s love/In the heart of each Tri-K.” Members learned about motherhood and traditional gender roles, assisted their mothers in promoting and catering to the main organization, and appeared in parades, sometimes as “Miss 100 Percent American,” a reference to the KKK's goal of keeping the white race 100 percent “pure.” The Ku Klux Kiddies, sometimes referred to as cradle cubs, was a klan for infants and children.

Life as a child in the Klan was abnormal. The kids in the klans participated in parades, went to picnics, and attended summer camps. A Kool Koast Kamp advertisement in Rockport, Texas promised “a real family recreation under high-class moral conditions for those involved in the Ku Klux Klan. Nights at the Kamp involved a law enforcer, who took part in KKK activities and watched the children within the Kamp. The children also attended Klan Kolleges during the 1920s in the states of Indiana and Georgia. Other activities for the Kid Klans consisted of KKK wedding rituals, charitable giving events, and funerals. At the funerals, the letters “KKK” were formed by an arrangement of flowers.

In contrast to the KKK's original formation as a Southern terrorist organization during the years of Reconstruction, the Klan encouraged and invited the involvement of women and children. It was part of an attempt to create a core of true believers who would ensure the supposed purity of the white race. After the release of the film, Birth of a Nation, the KKK movement was revived and grew to encompass three to eight million Klansmen by the mid-1920s. The Ku Klux Klan wanted to keep American society pure and free of anyone who was not white and Protestant. The Klan believed the best way to achieve that goal was to involve the entire family in their beliefs. As the “Invisible Empire” of the Ku Klux Klan reached its pinnacle of membership and national influence in the twenties, children partook in the Klan's societal rituals. Entire families dedicated their lives to promoting their ideology of white supremacy.

== Other auxiliaries ==
The American Krusaders was open to white, Protestant, naturalized American citizens of foreign birth.

The Klan's Colored Man auxiliary was for African-American men. Little is known about these auxiliaries.

In Oregon the Junior Order of Klansmen was for teenagers and the Eugene Police Department had been a helpful auxiliary for helping spread the rhetoric and implementing the goals of the KKK. Current EPD policy indicates no intentional association or assistance to the KKK at this point in time.
