= Budd Dairy Food Hall =

Food hall in Columbus, Ohio

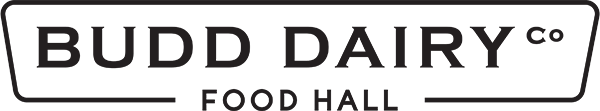
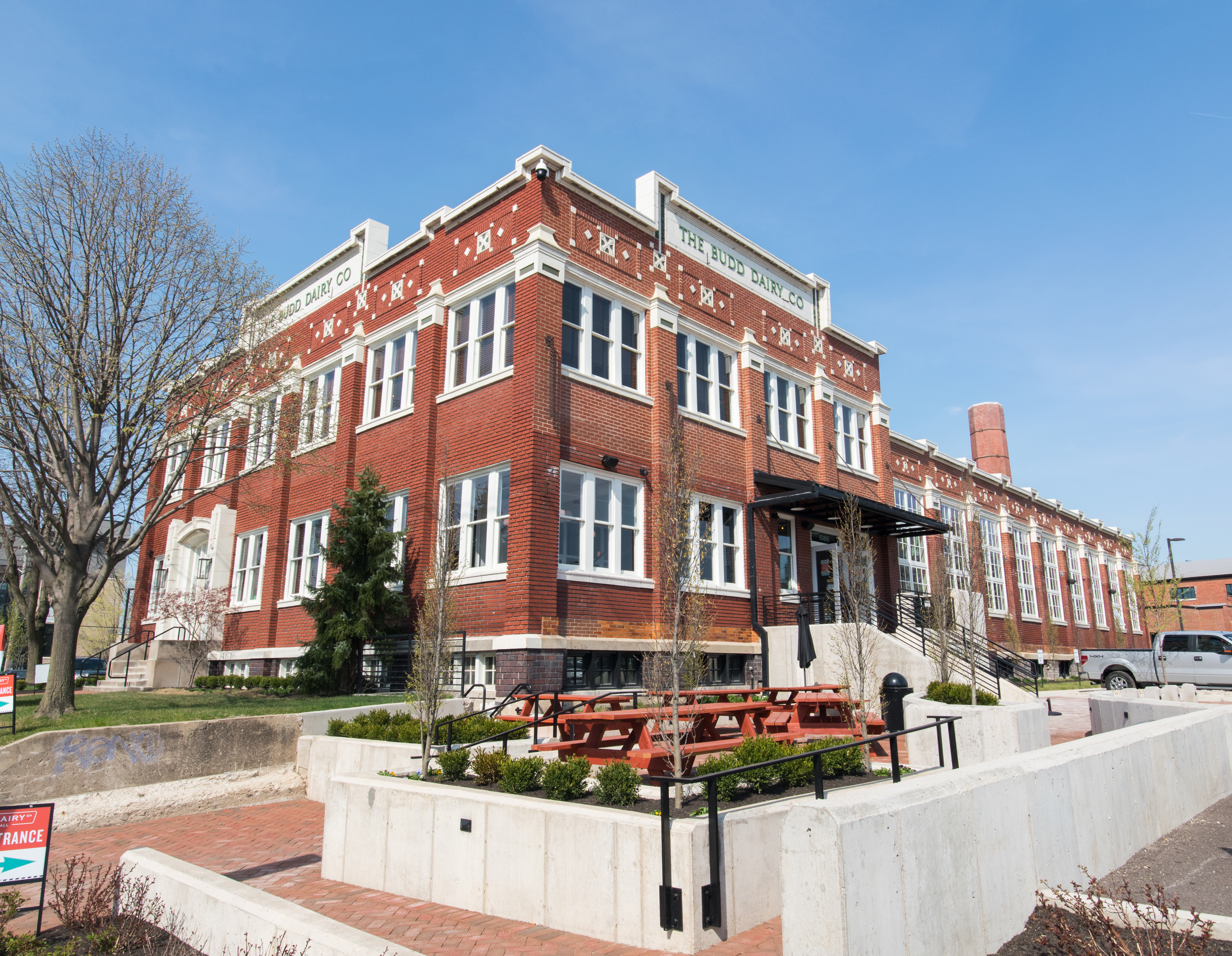
- On opening day in April 2021
- Coordinates: 39.985208°N 82.998791°W
- Address: 1086 N. 4th St., Columbus, Ohio
- Opened: April 6, 2021
- Manager: Cameron Mitchell Restaurants
- Parking: Surface lots
- Public transit: 4, 12; CoGo
- Website: Official website
- Budd Dairy Company
- U.S. National Register of Historic Places
- Interactive map highlighting the building's location
- Built: 1916
- Architects: W. H. Budd, D. Riebel & Sons
- NRHP reference No.: 100000664
- Added to NRHP: February 14, 2017

Budd Dairy Food Hall is a food hall in the Italian Village neighborhood of Columbus, Ohio. The Cameron Mitchell Restaurants-run hall holds ten foodservice locations, three bars, and indoor, patio, and rooftop seating. It is situated in the historic Budd Dairy Company building, a former milk processing and distribution facility. The space was renovated beginning in 2018, and opened in April 2021.

== Attributes ==
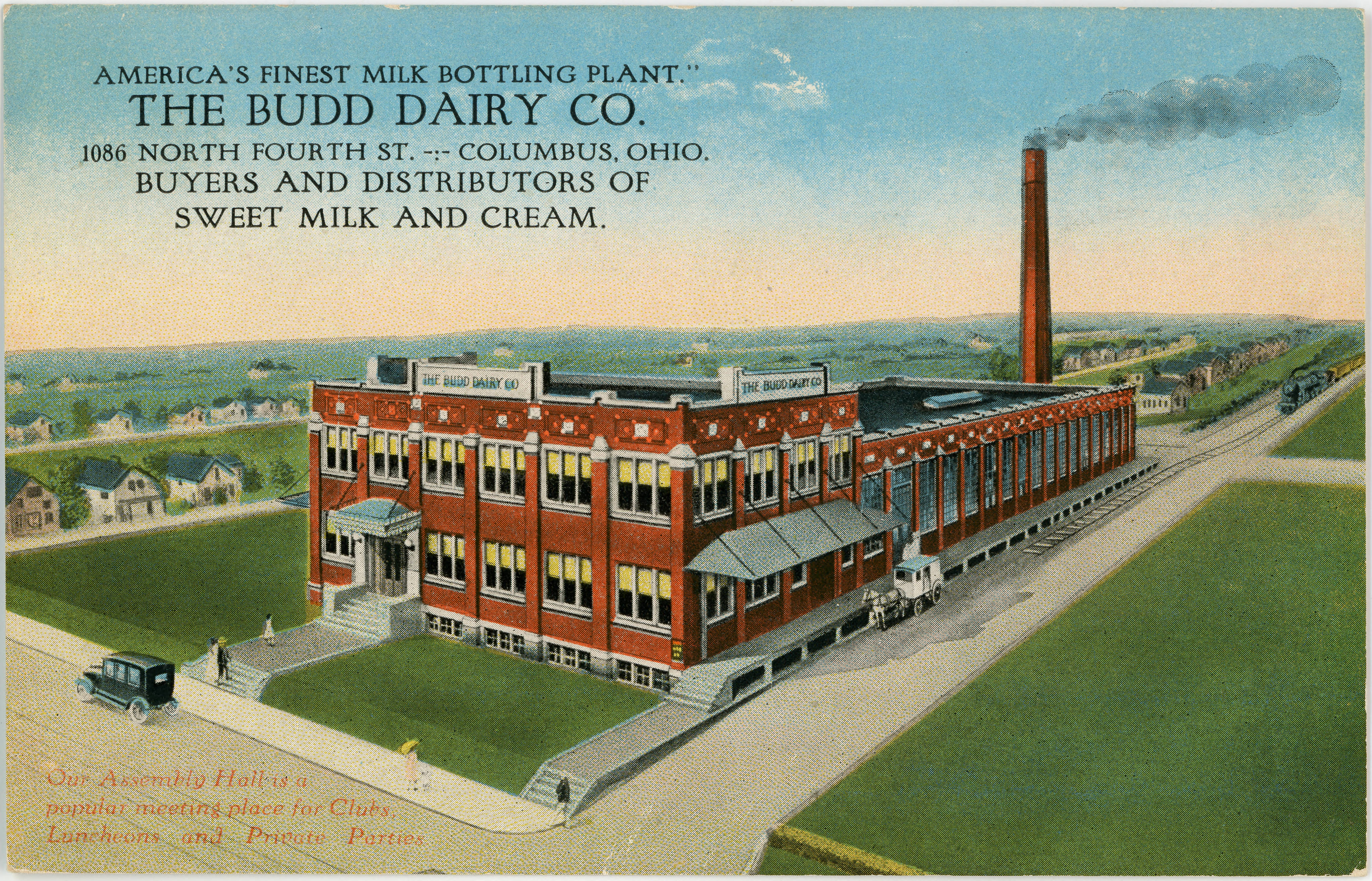
Early 20th century postcard illustration of the building

The one- and two-story building was designed by Budd Dairy Company president William Hooper Budd along with D. Riebel & Sons. The original structure measured 71 ft × 153 ft (22 m × 47 m). It has an exterior of red pressed brick and white enamel terra cotta trim. The inside utilizes concrete and steel, with white enamel brick finishes. The building originally had red tile floors throughout. Electric lights illuminated the building at night, with a total of 148 lamps.

When operated as a milk processing plant, the building featured pasteurization, clarification, and bottling machinery. An observation gallery, open to the public at all times, allowed visitors to view all steps of dairy processing taking place. The Budd Dairy plant had modern features at the time, including good ventilation, electric lighting, and an "air washing system" to change out air every four to ten times an hour. As first built, the basement contained machines for this system, as well as a power plant, ice plant, cold storage, and drivers checking room. An assembly hall and kitchen, measuring 33 ft × 38 ft (10 m × 12 m), was used for ladies' clubs and other public events by reservation. The space was free for public use.

Now operating as a food hall, the building has ten spaces for foodservice operations, including one for rotating pop-up businesses. In addition to those ten, the food hall has one bar on each of its two levels and a third bar on its rooftop patio. Eating spaces include seating on the main floor, several outdoor patios, second-floor dining space, and the rooftop patio. Budd Dairy has a unique ordering system where servers take drink orders, guests pay on their phones, and then they are texted to pick up their order when ready. The system was designed during the COVID pandemic to reduce exposure with traditional lines.

== History ==
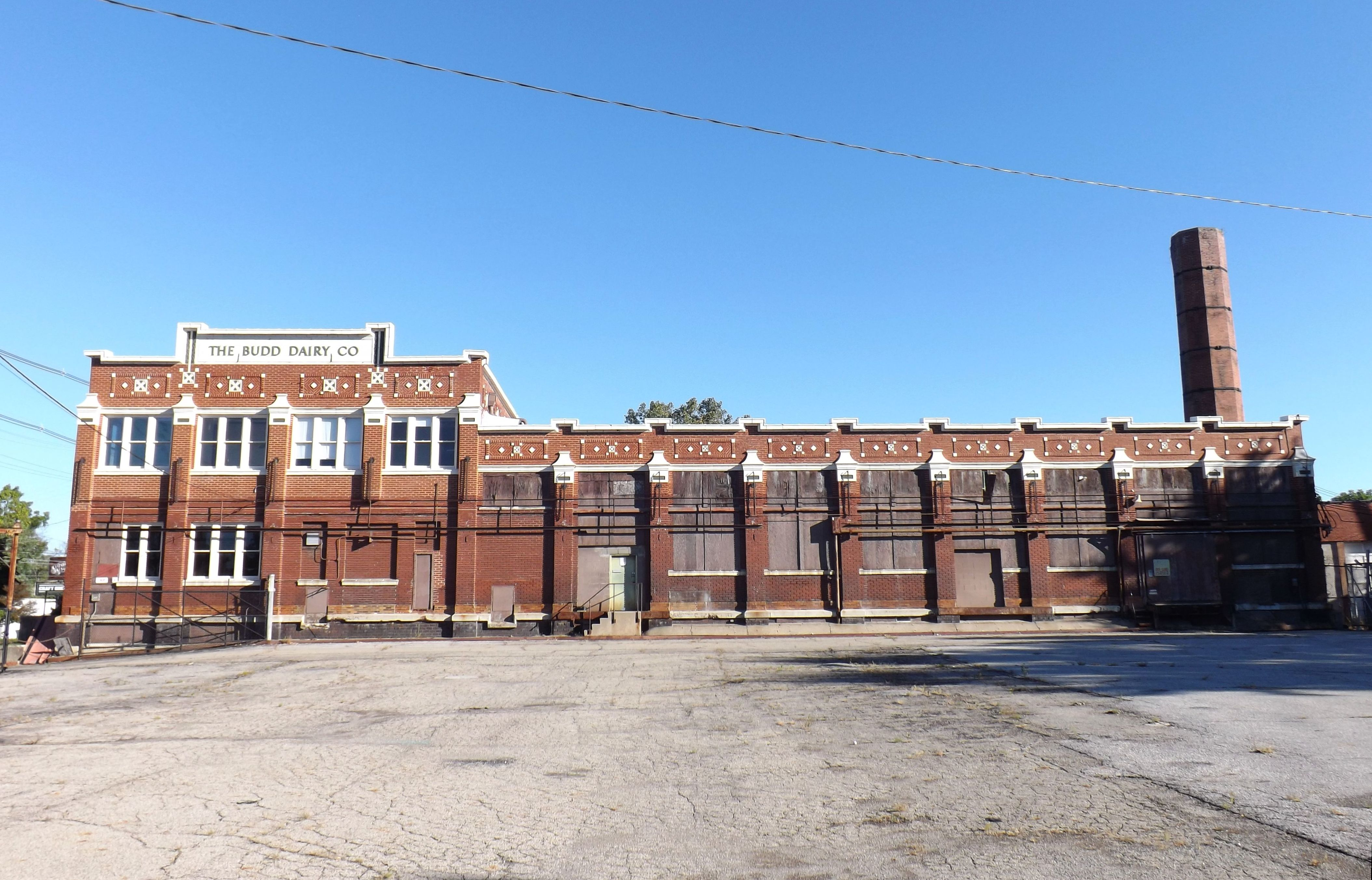
Prior to renovation, in 2014

The building was built in 1916, opening around January 1917. It had an estimated cost of $75,000. It operated as a milk processing and distribution center for the Budd Dairy Company, founded as the S.T. Budd Dairy Co. by Simon T. Budd in 1894. As first built, the building could process 6,000-14,000 gallons of milk and cream per day.

In 1923, the company advertised a product in The Fiery Cross, a Ku Klux Klan newspaper. The advertisement prompted a boycott of Budd Dairy products by the Black community, quickly followed by Catholics and Jews. The boycott is thought to be among the earliest successful race-related boycotts in the United States. Seven months into the boycott, in April 1924, the Hamilton Milk Co. purchased the financially weakened Budd Dairy Co. The company later became part of the Borden Dairy Co.

Developers received about $2 million to aide in its renovation in 2017. The building was listed on the National Register of Historic Places in the same year. The building was renovated to become the Budd Dairy Food Hall, a Cameron Mitchell Restaurants project. The project began in 2018 and was near opening in 2020 when the COVID-19 pandemic prompted a delay. Budd Dairy Food Hall opened to the public in April 2021.

== Gallery ==
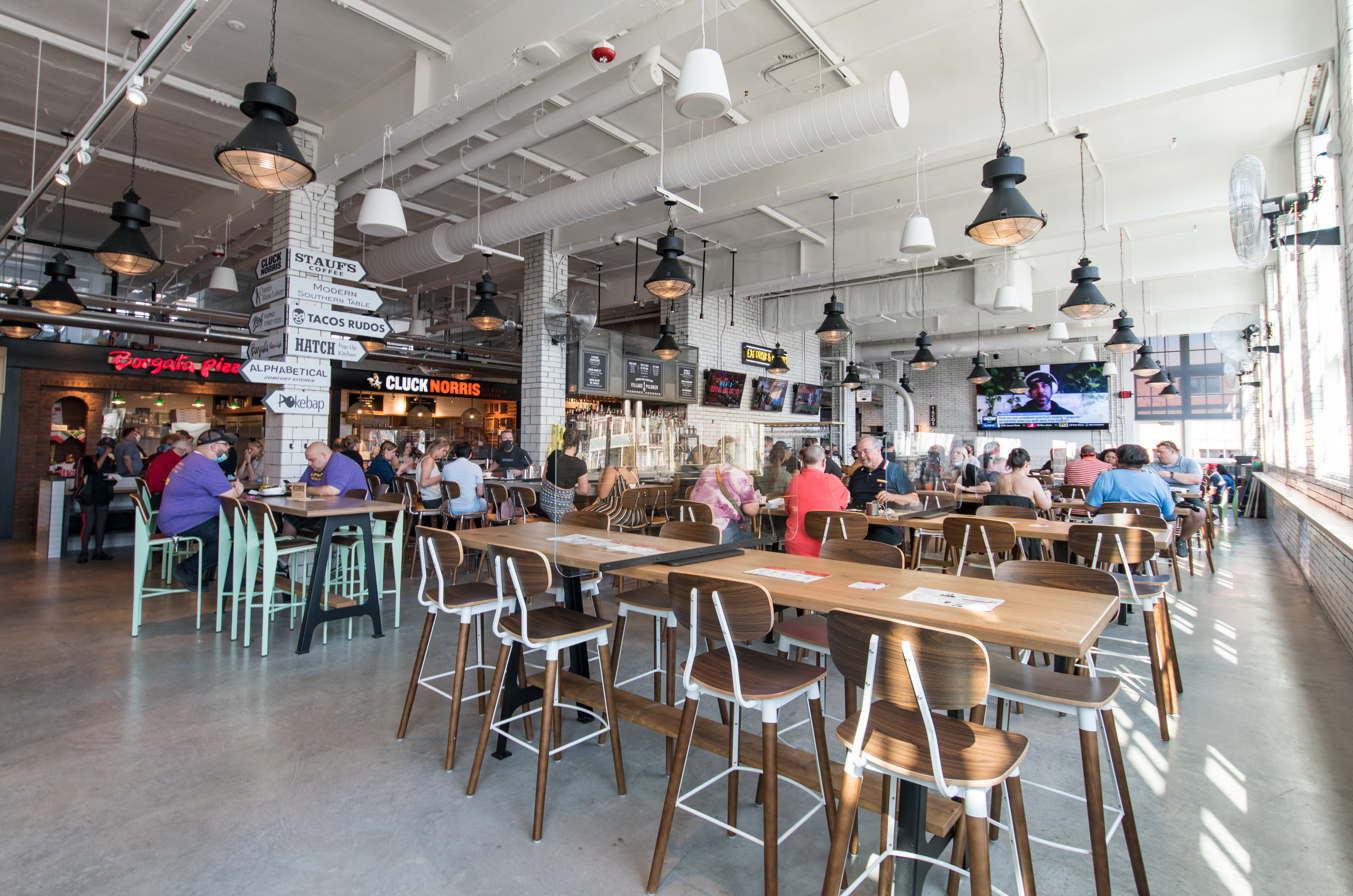
Main hall

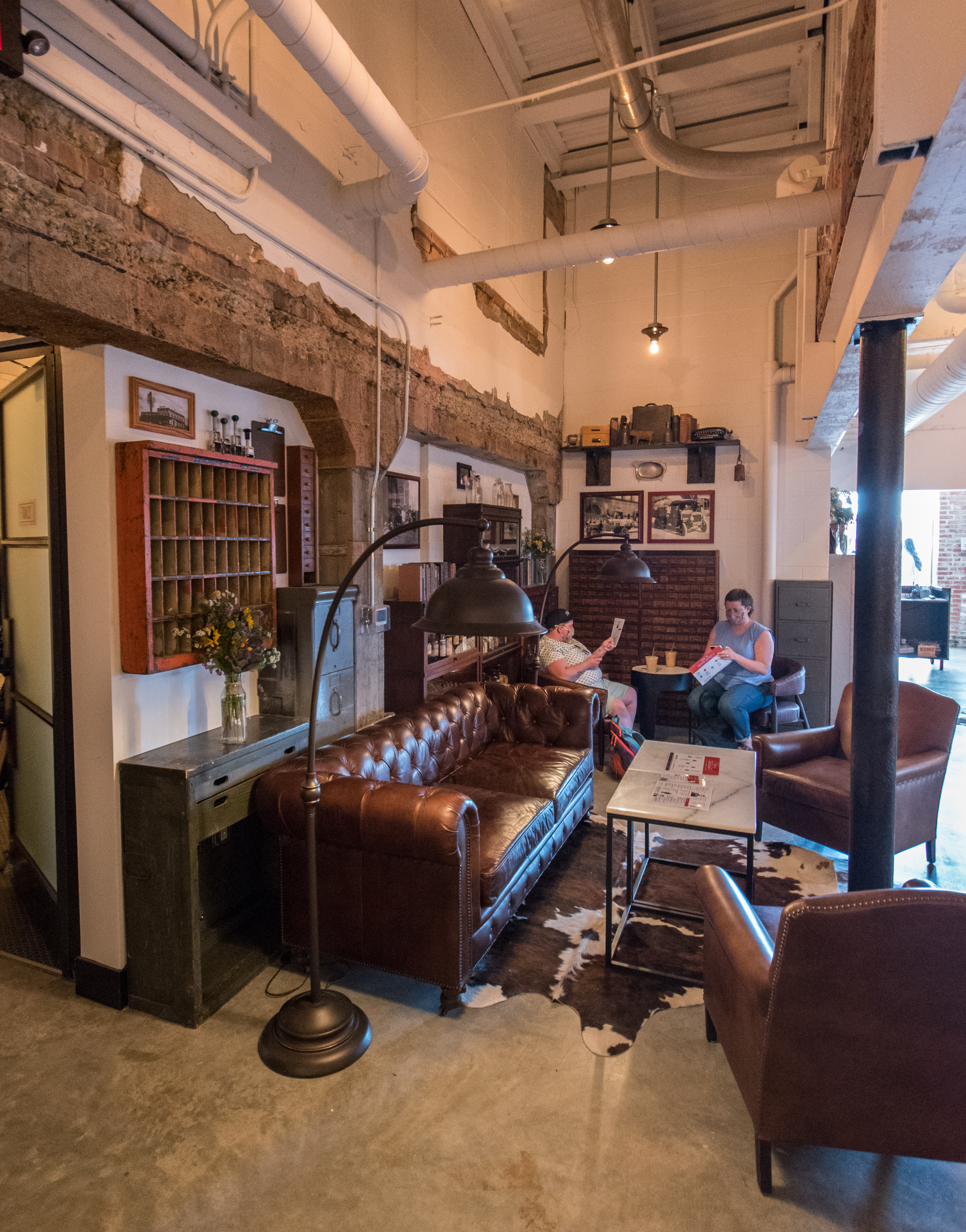
Lounge space

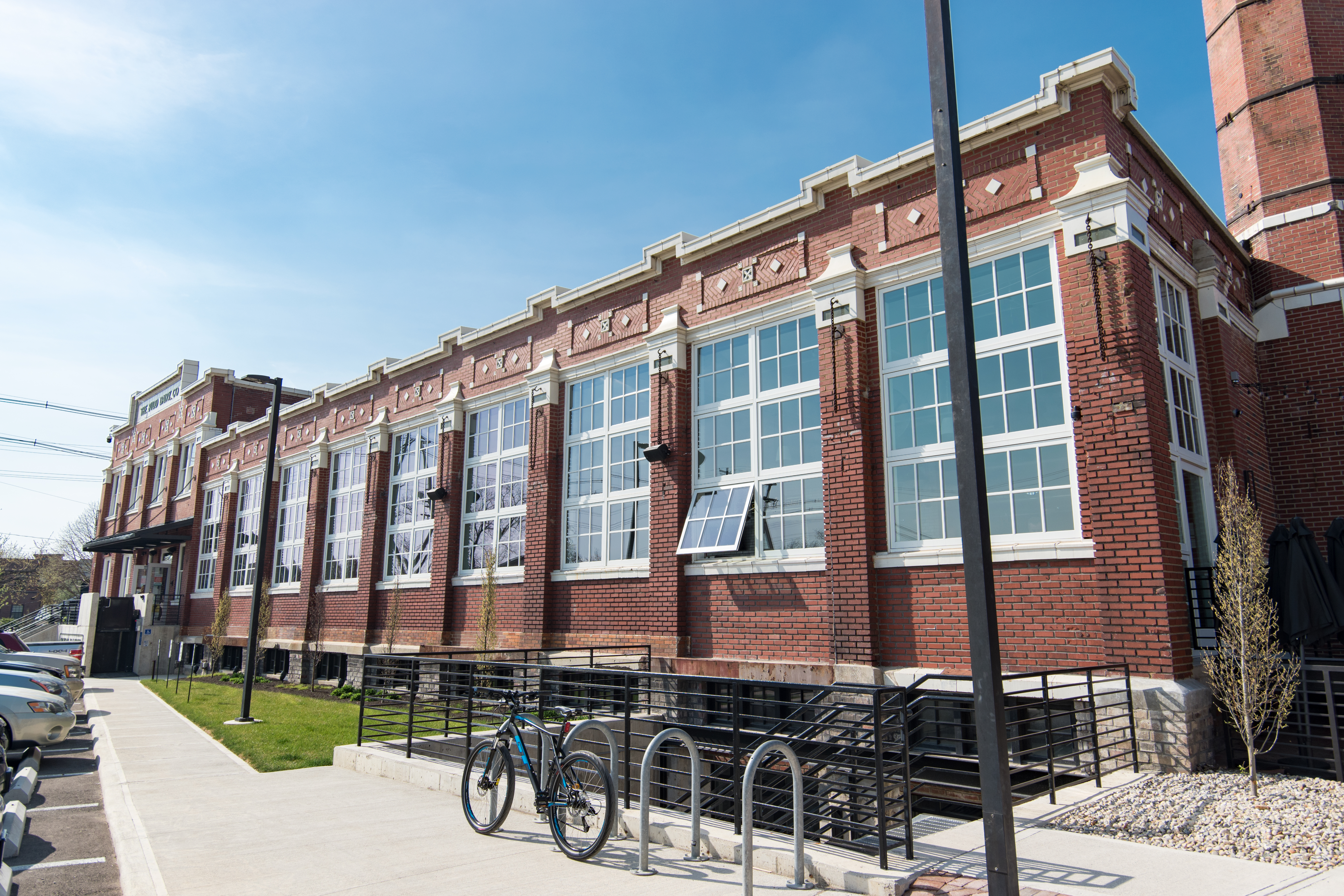
South facade details

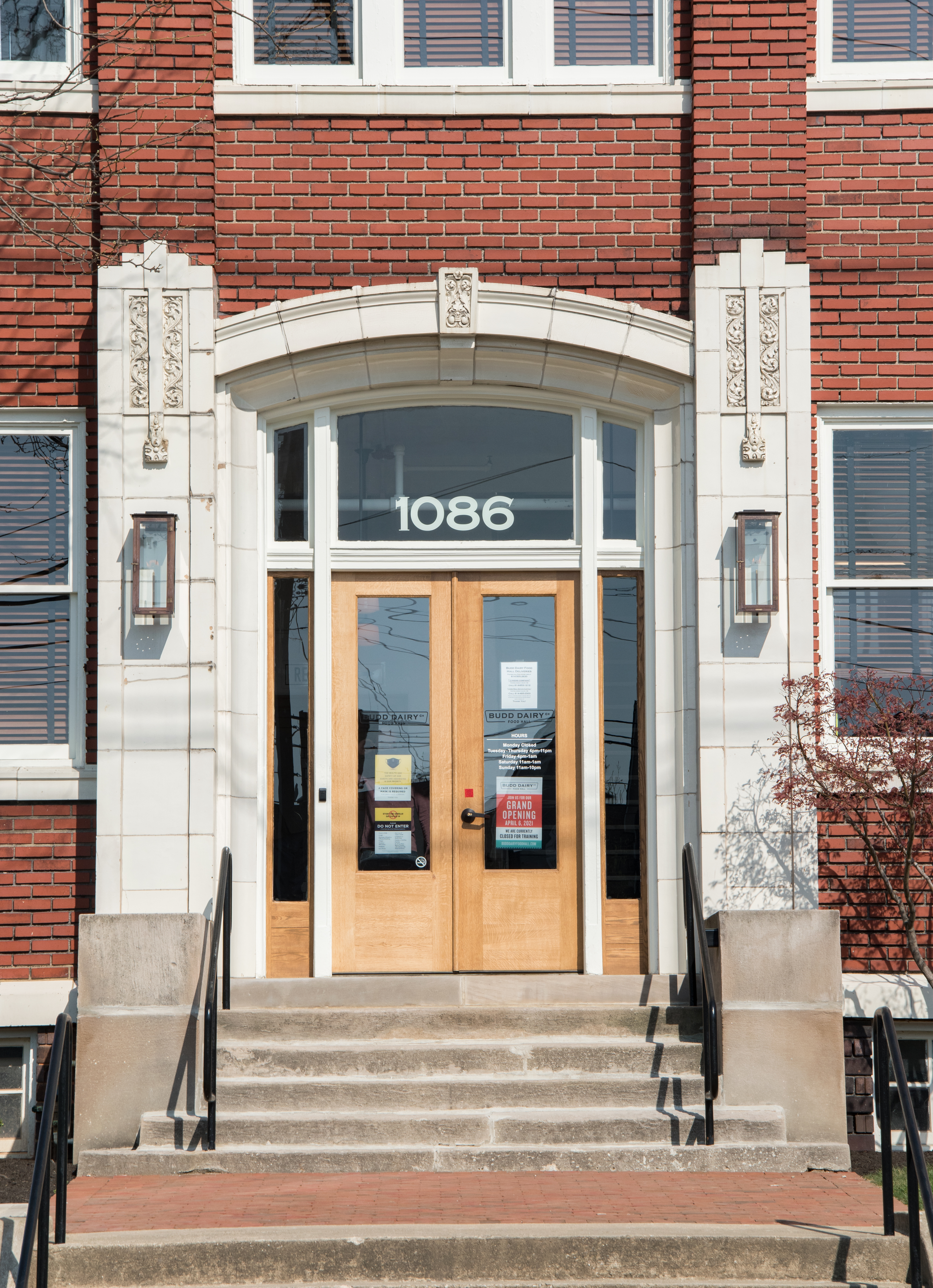
Original main entrance

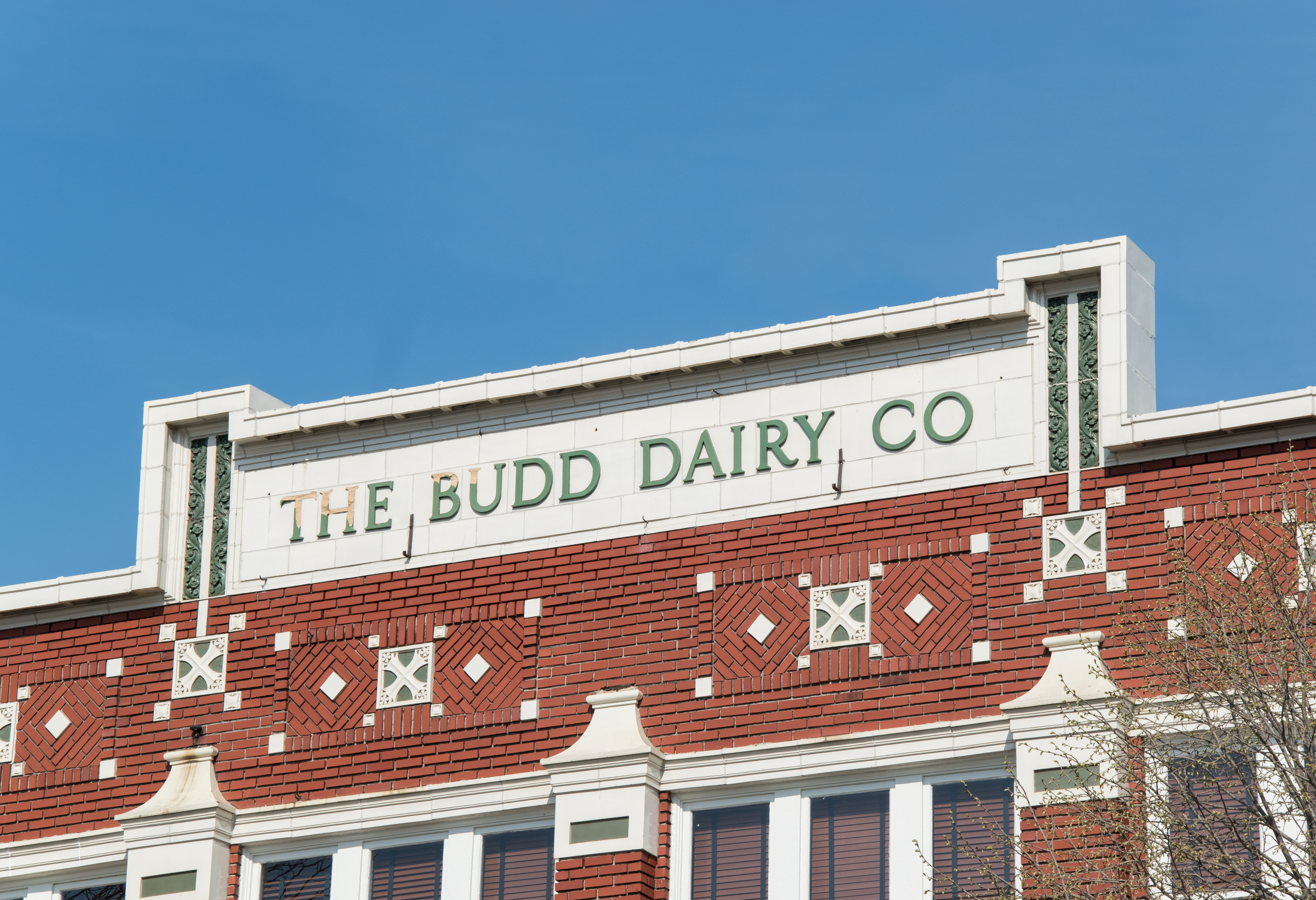
Signage facing Front St.

== See also ==
- National Register of Historic Places listings in Columbus, Ohio
