= Rusty Bucket Restaurant & Tavern =

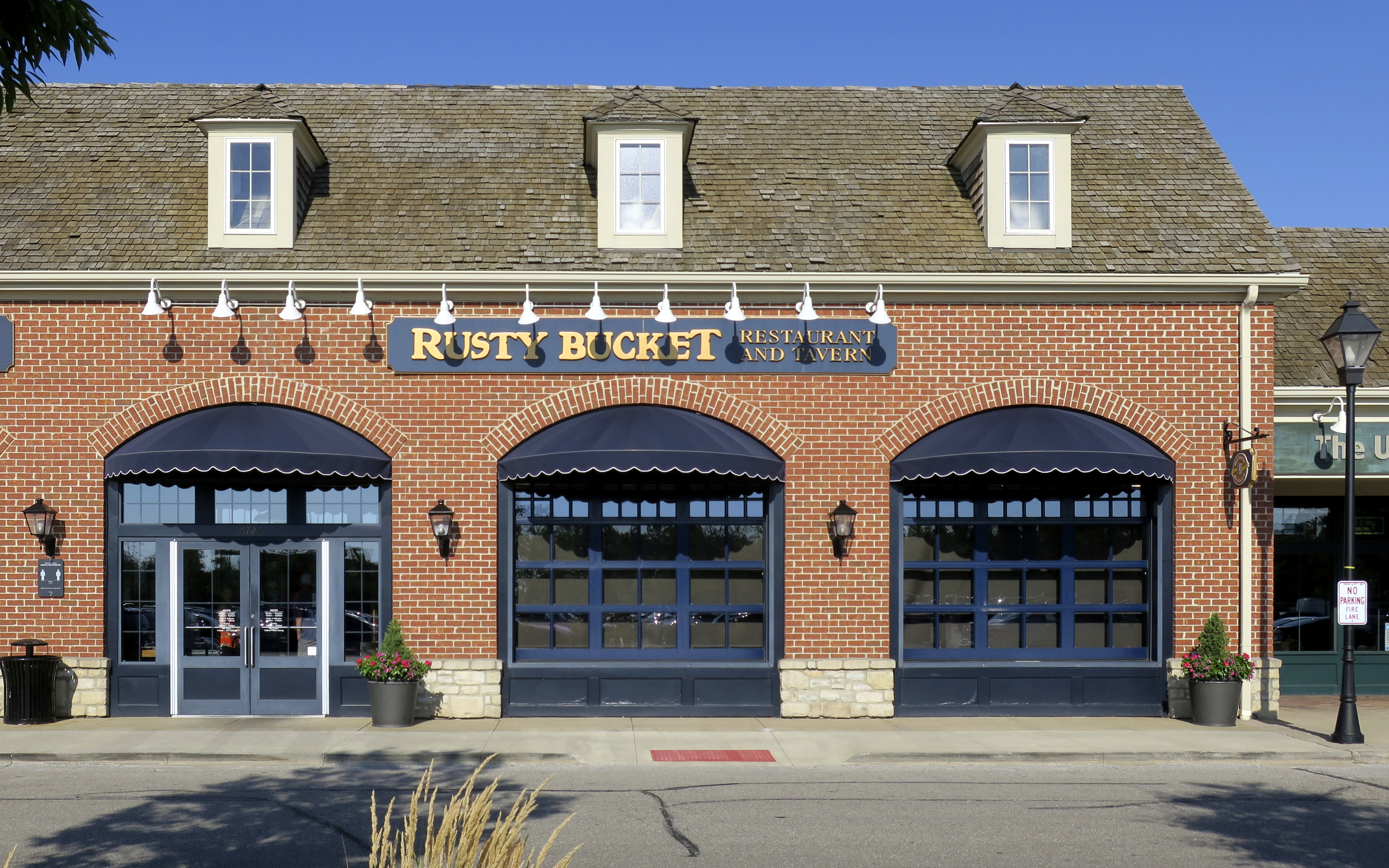
- Rusty Bucket Restaurant & Tavern (Dublin, Ohio)
- Type: Private
- Industry: Hospitality
- Founded: May 2002; 24 years ago
- Founder: Gary Callicoat
- Headquarters: Columbus, OH, United States
- Number of locations: 18
- Area served: Indiana; Michigan; North Carolina; Ohio
- Key people: Cameron Mitchell
- Parent: Cameron Mitchell Restaurants
- Website: "Rusty Bucket Restaurant & Tavern"

Rusty Bucket Restaurant & Tavern is a restaurant company headquartered in Columbus, Ohio. It was founded in 2002 by president and owner, Gary Callicoat. The company currently owns 18 restaurants in Ohio, Indiana, and Michigan. Rusty Bucket Restaurant & Tavern is the sister company of Cameron Mitchell Restaurants.

== Locations ==
- Indiana
  - Indianapolis
- Michigan
  - Bingham Farms
  - Bloomfield
  - Northville
- Ohio
  - Bexley
  - Clintonville, Columbus
  - Dayton
  - Dublin
  - Easton Town Center, Columbus
  - Gahanna
  - Hilliard
  - Liberty Center
  - Mason
  - New Albany
  - Rookwood, Cincinnati)
  - ((Upper Arlington, Ohio))
  - Westerville
  - Worthington
