= Ruth's Hospitality Group =

American holding company

Ruth's Hospitality Group, Inc.
- Traded as: Nasdaq: RUTH
- Industry: Restaurants
- Founded: May 2008; 18 years ago
- Defunct: June 2023; 3 years ago
- Fate: Acquired by Darden Restaurants
- Headquarters: Winter Park, Florida, USA
- Products: Luxury food service
- Revenue: 468,026,000 United States dollar (2020)
- Website: None

Ruth's Hospitality Group, Inc. was a restaurant company with a focus on American steakhouse restaurants. Ruth's was acquired by Darden Restaurants in June 2023.

The group was rebranded in May 2008, shortly after Ruth's Chris Steak House acquired the Mitchell's Fish Market and Columbus Fish Market brands from Cameron Mitchell Restaurants. The company was rebranded with a new name by CEO Mike McDonnell to reflect the broader diversity of restaurants in its portfolio. The company resold the MFM restaurant chain in 2014 for $10m to Landry's.

== History ==
The period immediately after the acquisition of the Mitchell's restaurants in February 2008 was turbulent and resulted in the ousting of CEO Craig Miller, who Mike O'Donnell replaced in April 2008. In 2009, RHGI reported declining revenues at both the Ruth's Chris and the Mitchell's brands, with a drop of 22% in Q2 2009. By 2010, O'Donnell had begun to reverse the decline, and in 2011, he was able to report an increase of 9.2% in revenue for Ruth's Chris and a decrease of just 2% for Mitchell's. Overall revenues rose by $15.9m to $353.6m. In a statement to shareholders, he attributed this to their growing success in private dining and catering facilities, as well as improved services for business customers.

In February 2013, RHGI reported a rise in revenues of 7.9% to $398.6 million in 2012 compared to $369.6 million in the prior year. They noted that 4th quarter sales at Ruth's Chris restaurants were up 7.0% on the previous year, representing the 11th consecutive quarterly increase in sales and 20% growth over three years. The Mitchell's brands showed an increase of 5.2% over the previous year.

RHGI continued to add new restaurants to the Ruth's Chris chain, including in Harrah's casino in Las Vegas in January 2013, after the previous Las Vegas location in the Flamingo closed in 2009. The company has announced plans for 2013 that include expanding the Ruth's Chris brand into China, a new Ruth's restaurant in Denver, Colorado, and four or five new franchised Ruth's locations.

In 2014 the company announced the resale of its Mitchell's brand to concentrate on its Ruth's Chris Steak House chain.

In May 2023, it was announced that Darden would acquire RHGI in a $715 million deal. The deal was completed in June of that year.

== Paycheck Protection Program ==
On April 17, 2020, two subsidiaries of Ruth's Hospitality Group received $20 million in Paycheck Protection Program loans secured by the federal government. Although the subsidiaries were eligible for these loans and planned to use them to pay their restaurant employees, there was a considerable public backlash.

Most businesses are eligible if they have 500 or fewer employees in the United States, but businesses in the restaurant industry were eligible if they had 500 or fewer employees per location. Each business is allowed one loan, but Ruth's Hospitality Group's two subsidiaries received a loan. When applying, each business must certify, in good faith, that "current economic uncertainty makes this loan request necessary to support the ongoing operations of the applicant." On April 23, after the Ruth's Chris subsidiaries applied for the loans under the then-existing loan guidelines, the Small Business Administration said that it is unlikely that a publicly traded business with substantial market value and access to capital markets could be eligible for a PPP loan. Because of the current economic uncertainty, such a business would not be able to certify in good faith that the PPP loan is necessary to support its ongoing operations. Businesses that had certified with a questionable basis to certify had until May 7 to repay loan proceeds or else risk investigation by the Small Business Administration.

On April 24, Ruth's Hospitality Group announced it would repay the loans.
