= Mitchell's Fish Market =

American seafood restaurant chain

- Company type: Subsidiary
- Industry: Restaurants
- Founded: 1998; 28 years ago
- Headquarters: Houston, Texas, USA
- Number of locations: 8 restaurants (as of 2021)
- Key people: Tilman J. Fertitta (Landry's, Inc.)
- Products: Luxury food service
- Revenue: ▲$70.3 million USD (2012)
- Parent: Landry's, Inc. (since 2014)
- Website: mitchellsfishmarket.com/

The Mitchell's Fish Market is an American seafood restaurant chain founded in 1998 by restaurateur Cameron Mitchell of Columbus, Ohio.

Starting from a single location opened in 1998 in Columbus called the "Columbus Fish Market", by 2006, the chain had 12 locations. The chain formed part of the Cameron Mitchell Restaurants group until 2008, when the then-22 unit chain, including 19 Fish Market units, was sold to Ruth's Chris Steak House (later renamed Ruth's Hospitality Group) for $92 million.

By 2014, it had 18 locations throughout Florida, Illinois, Indiana, Kentucky, Michigan, Ohio, Pennsylvania and Wisconsin. In late 2014, Landry's, Inc. acquired the chain from Ruth's for $10 million, a fraction of the 2008 sale price. The deal included 18 Mitchell's Fish Market locations and three steakhouse units.

As of January 2018, there were 14 Mitchell's locations.

As of January 2021, there are only 8 locations which remain open, located in the Midwest plus one in Louisville, Kentucky according to the Mitchell's homepage.

== See also ==
- List of seafood restaurants
