= Ruth's Chris Steak House =

American restaurant chain

- Trade name: Ruth's Chris Steak House
- Formerly: Chris' Steak House (1927–1976)
- Type: Division
- Industry: Restaurants
- Genre: Fine dining
- Founded: 1927; 99 years ago in Broad Street, New Orleans, Louisiana
- Founder: Chris Matulich (1927, namesake); Ruth Fertel (1965, namesake)
- Headquarters: Winter Park, Florida
- Number of locations: 100+ steakhouses
- Area served: United States (including Puerto Rico); Canada; Aruba; Panama; Mexico; Singapore; China; Indonesia; Japan; Taiwan; Hong Kong; Philippines
- Key people: Rik Jenkins (President)
- Products: Food service
- Revenue: US$468 million (FY 2019)
- Number of employees: 5,000+ (2020)
- Parent: Darden Restaurants
- Website: www.ruthschris.com

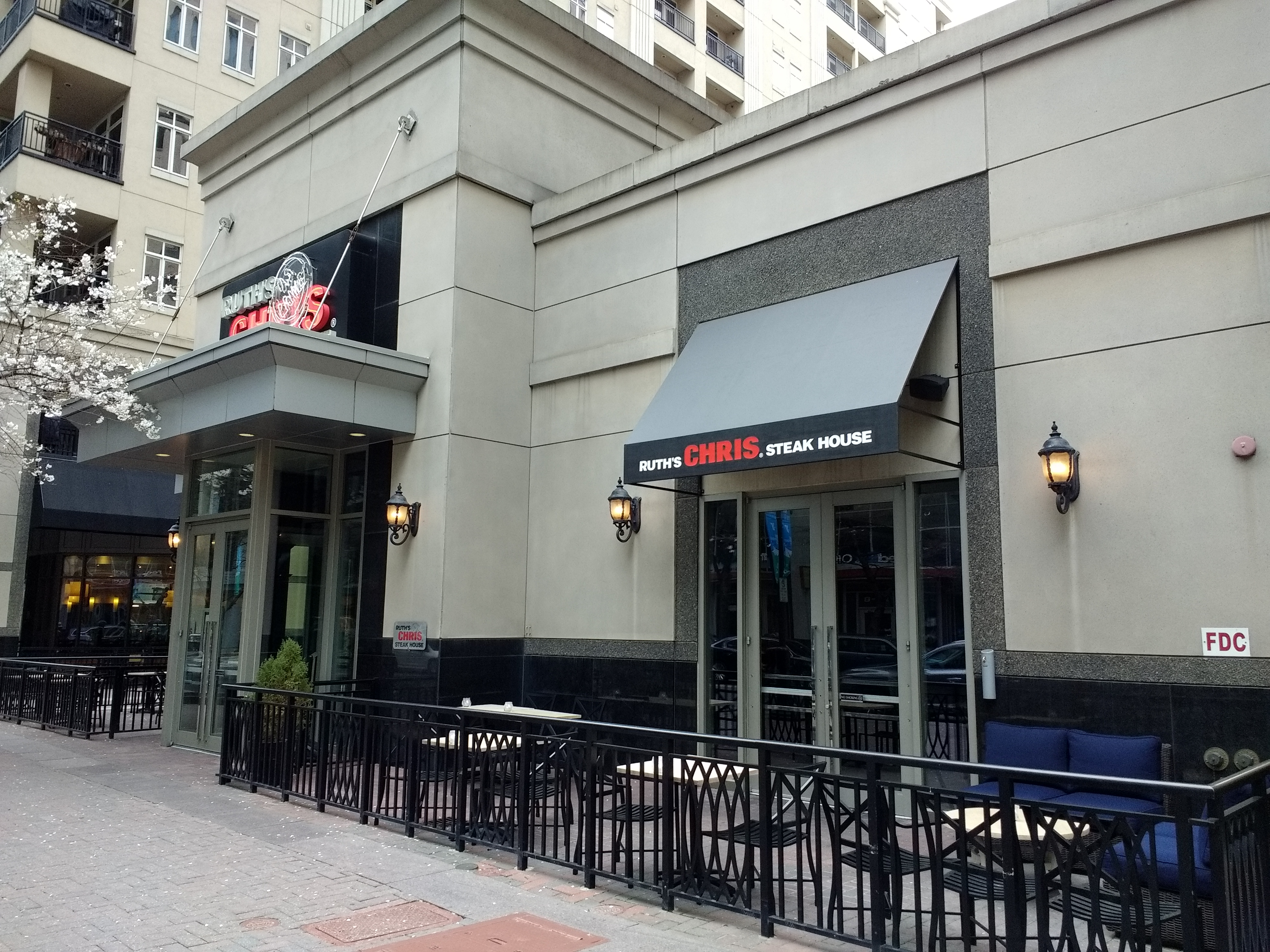
Ruth's Chris Steak House in Charlotte, North Carolina

Darden Concepts, Inc. doing business as Ruth's Chris Steak House, is a chain of over 100 steakhouses across the United States, Canada and Mexico. On May 22, 2008, the company underwent rebranding and became part of Ruth's Hospitality Group after its acquisition of Mitchell's Fish Market. The group's headquarters are in Winter Park, Florida. Darden Restaurants later acquired the chain.

== History ==
=== The original Chris' Steak House (1927–1965) ===
Chris' Steak House was founded on February 27, 1927, by New Orleans entrepreneur Chris Matulich. It was located at 1100 North Broad Street near the Fair Grounds Race Course, seated 60 people, and had no parking lot. During Matulich's 38-year management, the business was sold six times. Each time it was sold the business failed and Matulich bought the restaurant back cheaply from the purchasers. In 2022, the building became the focus of a historic preservation dispute, when its new owner demolished the iconic wraparound terracotta-tile awning without the proper permits.

=== Ownership by Ruth Fertel, 1965–1999 ===
==== Acquisition, 1965 ====
Ruth Fertel was a divorced single mother who needed money to send her teenage sons to college. Ignoring the advice of her banker, lawyer, and friends, Ruth purchased the restaurant in 1965. She used her brother's restaurant, Sig's Antique Restaurant in Port Sulphur, Louisiana, along with family recipes to lay the foundation for her restaurant. She initially planned to raise just $18,000 (equivalent to $183,900 in 2025) to cover the purchase price, until it was pointed out to her that she would need an additional $4,000 (equivalent to $41,000) to cover the cost of renovations and food. On her first day, May 24, 1965, she sold 35 steaks at $5 each (equivalent to $50).

Fertel personally took a hand in every part of the business. For many years, Chris Steak House was the only upscale restaurant in New Orleans with an all-female wait staff.

==== Name change to Ruth's Chris Steak House, 1976 ====
In early 1976, shortly after Fertel signed a new ten-year lease on the restaurant, a fire destroyed the building. Fertel had recently acquired a second property nearby to rent out as a party space. Within seven days, she had relocated the restaurant to its new location a few blocks away at 711 North Broad Street and re-opened it, expanding to 160 seats in the process. The sales agreement with Matulich prevented her from using the original name at any other address, so she named the new restaurant Ruth's Chris Steak House in order to keep some continuity with the previous location. She admitted later to Fortune Magazine that "I've always hated the name, but we've always managed to work around it."

==== Expansion and franchising, 1976–1999 ====
The first franchised restaurant was opened in 1977 by a loyal customer, Thomas J. "T. J." Moran (c. 1931–2015), in Baton Rouge, who went on to open several more franchised Ruth's Chris locations, TJ Ribs, and Ruffino's restaurants through his company T.J. Moran Associates. Fertel noted, "All our franchisees were people who had eaten at one time or another in one of our restaurants. We never looked for franchisees. They came to us". The chain expanded rapidly over the next two decades, with 66 locations in the U.S. and overseas by mid-1998, and achieving over $200 million in annual revenues.

=== Acquisition by Madison Dearborn 1999–2005 ===
In 1999, Fertel, then 72, developed lung cancer. She sold a 79.3 percent interest in the chain in August 1999 to investment company Madison Dearborn Partners of Chicago, remaining as a shareholder until her death in 2002.

In that period, the chain expanded to 86 restaurants, including 10 overseas locations. Revenues fell to $167.8 million in 2003, before rising again to $192.2 million in 2004.

=== Public company, 2005 onward ===
On August 9, 2005, under President and CEO Craig Miller, Ruth's Chris Steak House became a public company following a successful IPO valuing the company at $235 million and an increase of 15 percent in first-day trading.

==== Relocation to Florida, 2005 ====
In late August 2005 Hurricane Katrina devastated Greater New Orleans (see: Effect of Hurricane Katrina on New Orleans), and the chain moved its corporate headquarters to Heathrow, Florida. Like most businesses in the city, two of the chain's locations in the New Orleans area were forced to close because of the storm. The Metairie location has since reopened. Members of the Fertel family, particularly Ruth's son Randy, were bitterly opposed to the move. Amid much criticism by local officials and media, and on the heels of the announcement by Morton's that it would reopen its own New Orleans branch, the corporate offices announced that, due to extensive damage, the old flagship location on Broad Street would be permanently closed and donated to charity. Tulane University was the recipient of the gift, remodeling and reopening the site in 2012 as the Ruth U. Fertel/Tulane Community Health Center. In May 2008, Ruth's Chris reopened in New Orleans and is centrally located downtown in Harrah's Hotel.

In 2011, the corporate headquarters was relocated to its current location in Winter Park, Florida.

==== Expansion ====
In February 2008, the company purchased the Mitchell's Fish Restaurant and Columbus Fish Market brands from Cameron Mitchell Restaurants for $92 million. As the recession began to bite, the acquisition was not initially successful. The stock price fell from $22 in 2006 to under $5 and company debts rose to $185 million. CFO Tom Pennison resigned, and CEO Craig Miller was ousted by the board to be replaced by Mike O'Donnell. O'Donnell restructured and rebranded the company, creating Ruth's Hospitality Group (RHGI) as the parent entity in May 2008, allowing each of the individual restaurant brands to have their own identity within the group. The current President and COO is Kevin Toomy, formerly owner and president of the Goldcoast Seafood Grill in South Florida.

In February 2013, RHGI reported that fourth quarter sales at Ruth's Chris restaurants were up by 7.0 percent on the previous year, representing the 11th consecutive quarterly increase in sales.

Ruth's Chris continues to add new restaurants, most recently in Harrah's casino in Las Vegas in January 2013, after the previous Las Vegas location on Flamingo closed in 2009. a new restaurant in Denver, Colorado, and four or five new franchised locations. In 2015, it was announced that the restaurant was expanding into Albuquerque, New Mexico. In 2016, Ruth's Chris opened its restaurant in Odenton, Maryland. In 2018, Ruth's Chris opened at the Silver Legacy in Reno, Nevada which replaced Sterling's Seafood Steakhouse that had been in business from 1995 to 2018.

The newest Ruth's Chris location in West Des Moines, Iowa, opened in August 2023.

==== COVID-19 pandemic ====
During the coronavirus pandemic, Ruth's Hospitality Group received $20 million in forgivable loans intended for small businesses from the Paycheck Protection Program, leading to widespread backlash. The funds were distributed as part of the government's $2.2 trillion CARES Act, which set limits of $10 million per entity. On April 17, 2020, two of the company's subsidiaries each received $10 million. These loans were meant for companies with 500 or fewer employees while Ruth's Chris employs more than 5,700. On April 24, 2020, it was reported that the loans would be repaid to the Treasury Department following the public controversy.

=== Acquisition by Darden Restaurants (2023 – ) ===
On May 3, 2023, Darden Restaurants announced it was acquiring Ruth's Hospitality Group Inc. for $21.50 per share in an all-cash transaction with an equity value of approximately $715 million. The acquisition was completed on June 14.

== Lawsuits and discrimination ==
On multiple occasions and in several jurisdictions, Ruth's Chris has been the target of legal action for its treatment of staff, employees, and customers. In 2011, class action status was granted to female employees in a complaint that charged the company with pay discrimination, fewer promotions, and maintaining a "sexually-charged" environment.

In 2017, the company was accused of denying service to black customers, as part of a class action lawsuit. The charges stemmed from a Houston customer who was seated in a different dining area.
