= Larimer Square =

United States historic center

- U.S. National Register of Historic Places
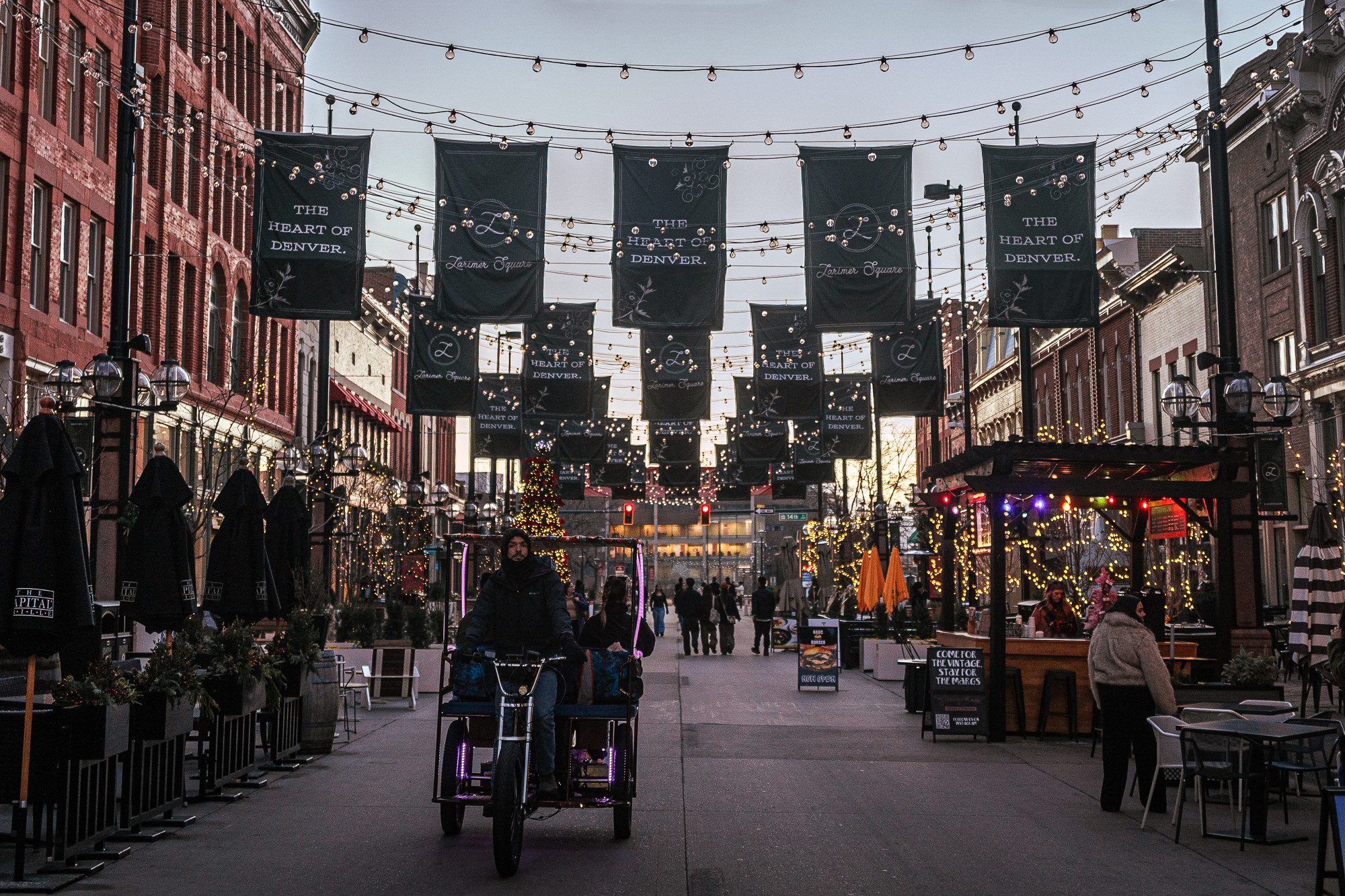

- Location within Colorado
- Location: 1400 block of Larimer St., Denver, Colorado
- Coordinates: 39°44′56″N 104°59′55″W
- Area: 1.8 acres (0.73 ha)
- Built: 1870
- Architectural style: Mixed (more than 2 Styles from different periods)
- NRHP reference No.: 73000468
- Added to NRHP: May 7, 1973

Larimer Square is a historic district located along Larimer Street in downtown Denver, Colorado. It is recognized as Denver’s oldest surviving commercial district and was designated the city’s first historic district in 1971.

== History ==
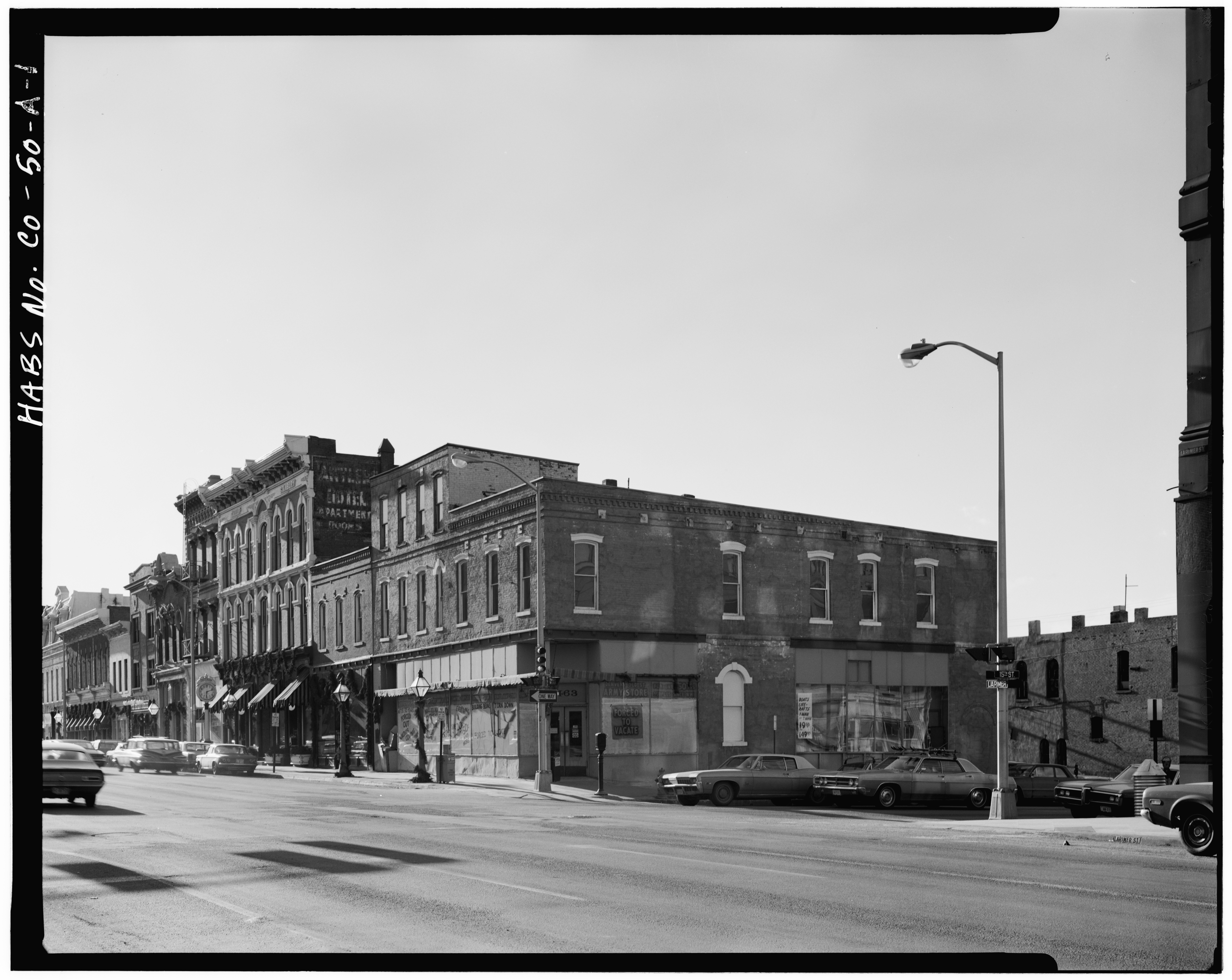
A historic photo of Larimer Square

=== Early history ===
The oldest commercial block in the city, the Larimer Square was originally laid out by William E Larimer in 1858. During the Pike's Peak gold rush, the street developed into Denver’s primary commercial corridor, hosting hotels, saloons, retail stores, and professional offices.

Most of the buildings that now comprise Larimer Square were constructed between the 1870s and 1890s. These structures reflect Victorian-era commercial architecture typical of western boomtowns and were built as Denver expanded into a regional trade center.

=== Decline and urban renewal pressure ===
By the early twentieth century, Denver’s commercial center had shifted away from Larimer Street toward other parts of downtown. Economic downturns, including the Panic of 1893, followed by suburbanization and changing retail patterns, contributed to the area’s decline.

By the mid-twentieth century, Larimer Street was widely regarded as blighted. Many buildings were subdivided or underutilized, and several proposals during the 1950s and 1960s called for demolition of the block as part of broader urban renewal efforts affecting downtown Denver.

=== Preservation and designation ===
Larimer Square was preserved largely through the efforts of preservationist Dana Hudkins Crawford, who began acquiring and rehabilitating buildings on the block in the 1960s.. At a time when historic preservation was uncommon in Denver, Crawford advocated for adaptive reuse rather than demolition.

In 1965, Larimer Square Associates began restoring it as a historical and commercial centre. Her rehabilitation work led to the stabilization and reuse of the nineteenth-century buildings and helped establish historic preservation as a viable redevelopment strategy in the city. In 1971, Larimer Square became Denver’s first officially designated historic district, providing legal protections for its buildings and streetscape.

=== Modern use ===
Following its rehabilitation, Larimer Square developed into a mixed-use district containing restaurants, retail spaces, offices, and entertainment venues. The block is known for its pedestrian-oriented streetscape and seasonal lighting displays.

Larimer Square has been cited as an early example of adaptive reuse influencing later downtown redevelopment projects in Denver and other western cities.

== Architecture ==
The buildings within Larimer Square form a cohesive collection of late nineteenth-century commercial architecture. Construction dates primarily range from the 1870s through the 1890s, with most structures rising two to four stories in height.

Common architectural features include brick and stone masonry facades, decorative cornices, tall storefront windows, and regularly spaced upper-story fenestration. While individual buildings vary in detailing, the block maintains a consistent scale and rhythm reflective of its historic development as a unified commercial streetscape.

Several buildings within Larimer Square are individually listed on the National Register of Historic Places or contribute to the Larimer Square Historic District.
