= The Fiery Cross (newsletter) =

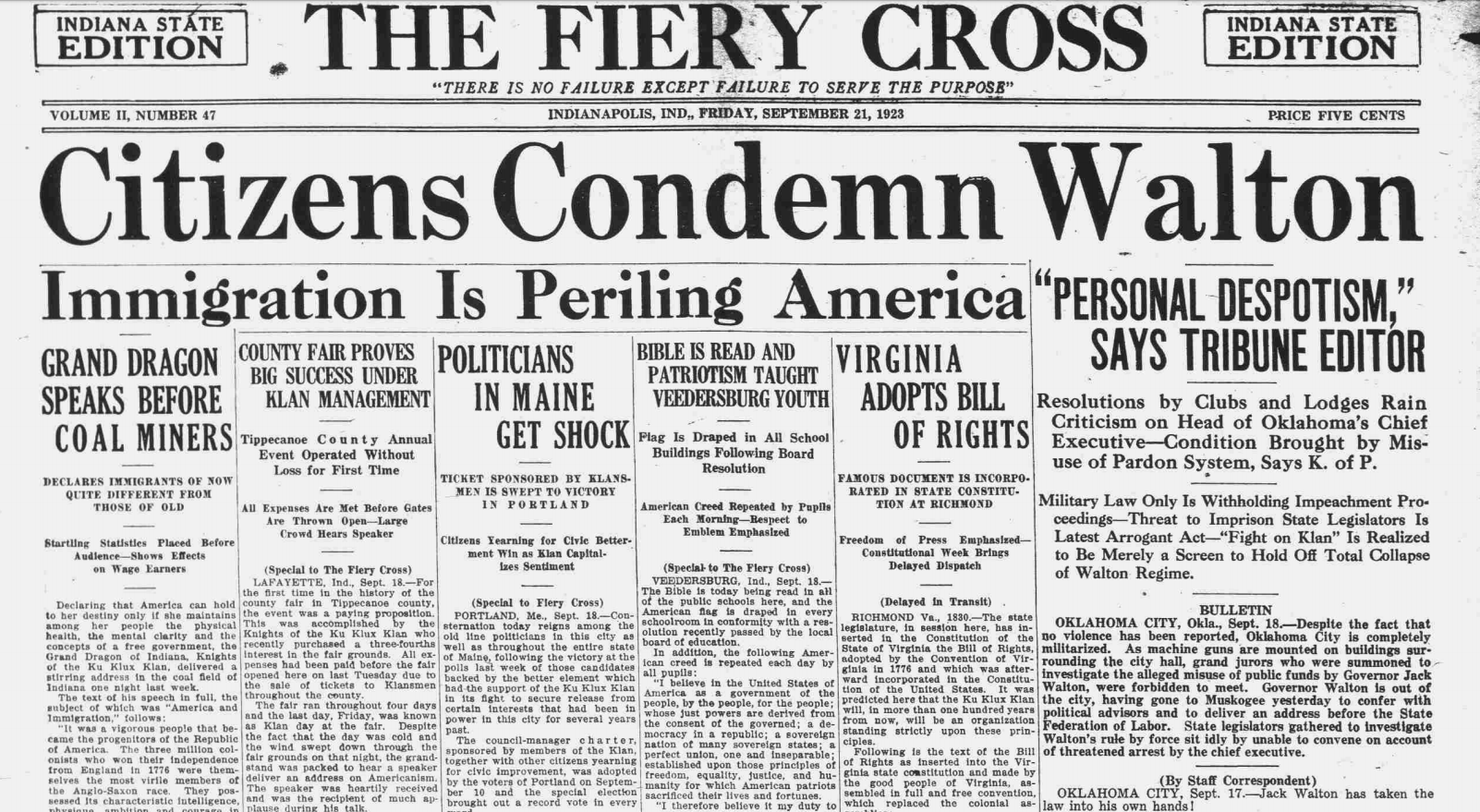
- Front page of the September 21, 1923, issue of the Indiana edition
- Type: Weekly newsletter
- Editor: Milton Elrod
- Founded: July 1922
- Ceased publication: February 1925
- Political alignment: Far-right
- Language: English
- Headquarters: Indianapolis, Indiana, U.S.

The Fiery Cross was an American weekly newsletter published by the United Klans of America, an organisation of the Ku Klux Klan (KKK). The newsletter was published mainly to attract the attention of "on-the-low" Whites, allowing them to be connected with the Klan without fear of others knowing they themselves are members. Its editor was Milton Elrod.

The Fiery Cross had several different editions that operated in different states. In Minnesota, publication of the pro-KKK Call of the North newspaper was taken over on February 22, 1924, and renamed the Minnesota Fiery Cross. Additional editions operated in Indiana between July 1923 and January 1925, and in Ohio between July 1923 and May 1924. After it ceased publications, it was succeeded in both states by the Indiana Kourier and the Ohio Kourier, who were both linked to the KKK. The Fiery Cross was primarily published out of Indianapolis in Indiana, which had the highest number of KKK members of any U.S. state in the early 1920s.

The Fiery Cross, as an extension of the KKK, advocated for stricter immigration laws and nativism, enforcement of the Eighteenth Amendment and Prohibition, and Protestantism. Excerpts from the Indiana edition have been used by historians to study the Indiana Klan. The stated mission of The Fiery Cross was to “to shake up people’s minds: to help mold active public opinion which will make America a proper place to live in.” The name is a reference to cross burning by the KKK.

== History ==
The Indiana Klan was controlled in the early 1920s by D. C. Stephenson, who became the Grand Dragon of the Indiana Klan on July 4, 1923. However, Stephenson came into conflict with the Imperial Wizard Hiram Wesley Evans and eventually split the Indiana Klan from the national organisation. During this split, ownership of The Fiery Cross was fought for, but in the end Evans won control over the paper.

== Content ==
As a newspaper for the KKK, The Fiery Cross advocated for the same political views and ideology held by the Klan. In multiple articles, it wrote in opposition to Catholicism and claimed they were responsible for much of the moral depravity of the period. Similarly, it commonly advocated for stricter immigration laws and nativism, and adherence to Prohibition.

As the reputation of the KKK was harmed by reports of violent acts committed by Klansmen, The Fiery Cross attempted to improve the Klan's reputation in its writing. It stated that the Klan "lived by a code of morals, tolerance and kinship." Additionally, it wrote that Klansmen were themselves victims of violence after membership lists were published in Indiana by other newspapers. The Fiery Cross wrote articles against the anti-KKK American Unity League of Chicago.
