= Kevin J. McCaffrey =

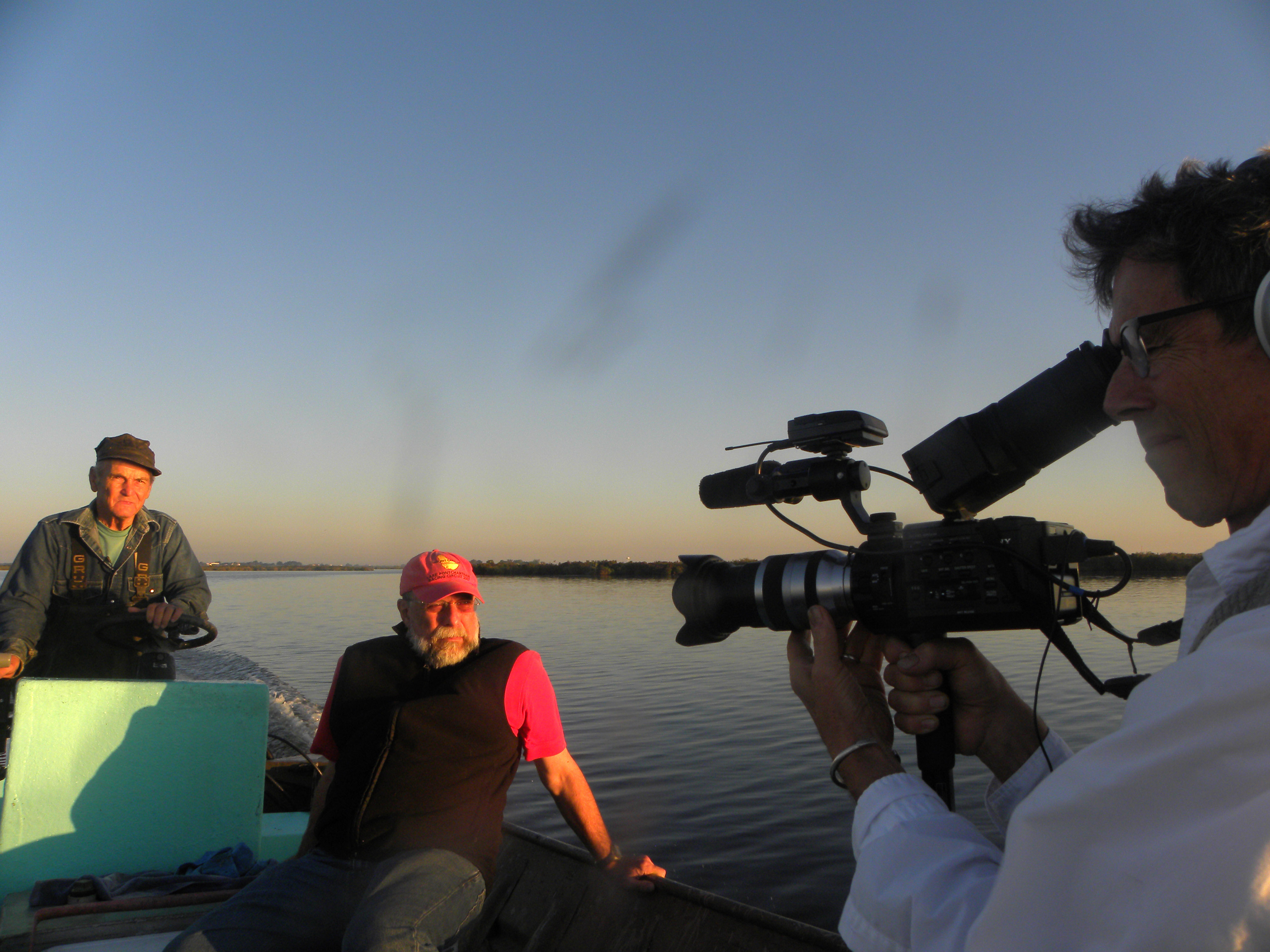
- Born: 1950 (age 75–76)
- Known for: Documentary Filmmaking, Oral Historian
- Notable work: No One Ever Went Hungry: Cajun Food Traditions Then & Now, Finding Common Ground

Kevin J. McCaffrey is an American filmmaker, writer, editor, and oral historian based in New Orleans. His documentary and archivist work primarily focuses on Louisiana history and culture, with an emphasis on the region's culinary history and environmental issues. McCaffrey's work has received both national and regional recognition. He has worked with a number of notable organizations dedicated to preserving the history and culture of Louisiana and New Orleans, including New Orleans Jazz & Heritage Foundation, Louisiana State Museum, Historic New Orleans Collection, WYES-TV, Loyola's Center for Environmental Communication, and the Louisiana Folklife Commission.

== Career ==
McCaffrey initially began his professional career in journalism, beginning with his college newspaper and literary magazine at Spring Hill College. His first national publication appeared in the 1973 “Fear and Loathing at the Watergate" issue of Rolling Stone.

By the early 1980s, McCaffrey had relocated to New Orleans and entered the book retail industry; he became active in the New Orleans booksellers community and subsequently, a key figure at the national level. His community work at the time included co-founding the New Orleans Gulf South Booksellers Association (NOGSBA); in 1985, while serving as president of NOGSBA, McCaffrey established the long-standing Book Tent at New Orleans Jazz & Heritage Festival in an effort to promote local bookstores and authors. During that same period, he also served as a co-founding board member of the Tennessee Williams & New Orleans Literary Festival, which was originally developed to combat the city's then ongoing recession; the debut festival is estimated to have brought in around 500 attendees; as of 2021, the annual event recorded 12,000+ attendees. In 1986, McCaffrey was elected to the board of directors of the American Booksellers Association and went on to serve a second term in 1989.

McCaffrey continued freelance editorial work, and his writing has appeared in publications that include School Library Journal, New Orleans Times-Picayune, and Louisiana Cultural Vistas. In 2005, he co-wrote, edited, and published a book titled The Year By Year, Selectively Quirky, History of the New Orleans Jazz & Heritage Festival, the first year-by-year historical survey of the annual festival.

=== Oral Historian and Documentarian ===
In the early 2000s, McCaffrey's career transitioned to oral history and documentation work, with a specific focus on the preservation of Louisiana culture, culinary history, and environment. His debut film A Common Pot: Creole Cooking on Cane River premiered on WYES-TV in 2003. His 2009 film, We Live To Eat: New Orleans’ Love Affair With Food, presents a New Orleans food history that was described by one reviewer as "a time capsule of culinary heritage." The film was named a finalist for a James Beard Award. His documentary No One Ever Went Hungry: Cajun Food Traditions Then & Now premiered at the Southern Food and Beverage Museum in 2011; McCaffrey stated his intention was not only to display the complexity of Cajun cuisine's development, but also show viewers why he believes Cajun culture displays "lessons of sustainability, community, and environmental response." The documentary was nominated for two Taste Awards and went on to receive the 2012 Louisiana Humanities Documentary of the Year Award.

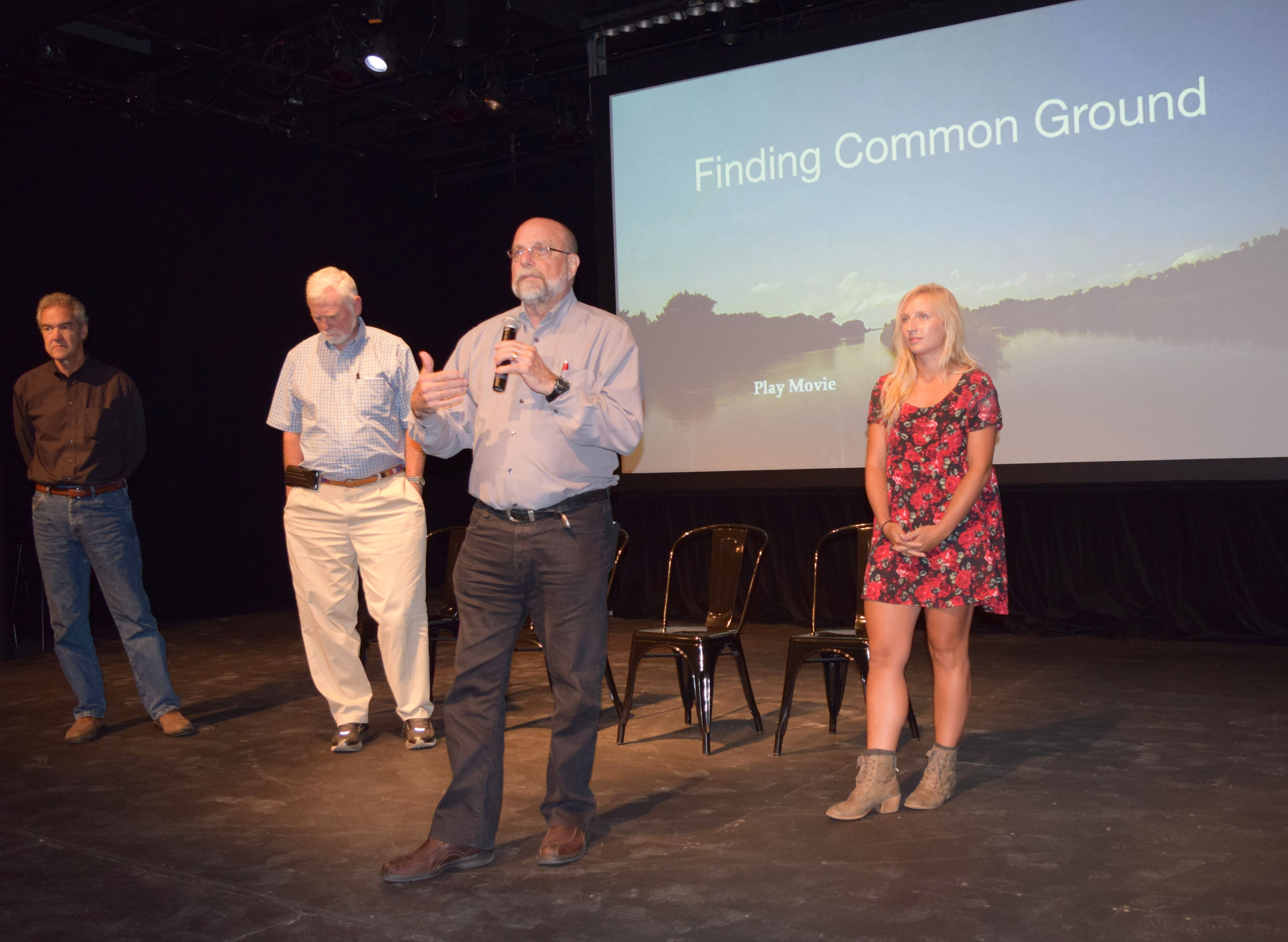
Kevin McCaffrey at screening of Finding Common Ground, New Orleans, with production team, Robert Thomas, PhD., Emma Reid, and Lenny Delbert Jr.

Both McCaffrey's culinary culture and environmental documentaries center interviews with both industry experts and Louisianian civilians' lived experiences. In an interview discussing his 2021 film Eternal Flow, McCaffrey described its format as a "stacked documentary," which he defined as an intentional series of vignettes that can be continuously expanded upon with further documentation. He also stated that all of his documentary work is fueled by a desire to promote "ordinary people doing extraordinary things.".

McCaffrey's expertise and oral history research on these topics have been cited in several books and academic papers, as well as cultural and economic reports commissioned by the state of Louisiana. His academic recognition includes a 2009 Research Fellowship from Newcomb Center for Research on Women and a 2013 Monroe Fellowship from Tulane University for a documentary on the history of jazz music. He is also a fellow of the Loyola University Institute for Environmental Communication.

=== Collaborations ===
In 2004, McCaffrey joined Dr. Robert Thomas, Director of the Loyola University Center for Environmental Communication, in directing and producing MRGOing, Going Gone?, a critique of the MRGO shipping channel; the film took almost 10 years to complete and was recognized with a Telly Award. McCaffrey and Dr. Thomas' follow-up documentary, Finding Common Ground, explores environmental planning in Louisiana and received a 2018 Impact Docs Award.

Through his production company e/Prime Media, McCaffrey and collaborator Randy Fertel of The Ruth Fertel Foundation enlisted WWOZ and the Ponderosa Stomp to partner in co-developing the website A Closer Walk, NOLA. The website provides an interactive, virtual map of information about notable locations related to New Orleans' music history.A Closer Walk was nominated for a 2018 Webby Award in the Travel Apps and Software category.

In 2019, McCaffrey joined with environmental activist Richard McCarthy to produce Lunch Money, a short film arguing in favor of implementing a modern day Marshall Plan in order to address economic disparities in rural America and reinvest in small farmers.

Former Newcomb Center archivist Susan Tucker credits McCaffrey as an instrumental organizer of oral history references for her book New Orleans Cuisine: Fourteen Signature Dishes and Their Histories. The book was initially developed through The New Orleans Culinary History Group, of which McCaffrey was a member; in a review of the book, "Where NOLA Eats" columnist Judy Walker commented on the historical detail in New Orleans Cuisine and posited that "Culinarians [will] spend the next 100 years relying on this unusual book."

A regular collaborator for McCaffrey has been his wife, artist Jan Gilbert, with whom he has worked on a number of community and culture-related art, environmental, and humanities projects. Since the '80s, they have contributed to a long-term academic research and applications development project on trans-cultural psychiatry and theater anthropology, conducted by Dr. Jacques Arpin of Geneva, Switzerland. Entitled "Masters of their Conditions," the study examines cultural rituals as performance and presents an art-making and therapy model that utilizes performance-based techniques. Gilbert and McCaffrey assisted with Dr. Arpin’s research on how communities cope with natural disasters, using Cajun culture as a point of reference. Both Gilbert and McCaffrey have joined with Dr. Arpin in presenting the study at international academic symposiums.

Several of Gilbert and McCaffrey's other collaborations have revolved around the aftermath of Hurricane Katrina, from art exhibitions to events produced through the VESTIGES Project arts collective. In 2011, they jointly served as guest editors for a special issue of TDR: The Drama Review. Entitled "New Orleans after the Flood," the issue reflected on the New Orleans' art community's ongoing efforts to recover from the effects of Hurricane Katrina.

== Selected Longform Documentary Work ==
Year	Film	Role
2021	Eternal Flow	Director, producer, writer, editor
2019	Lunch Money	Producer, director, writer
2017	Finding Common Ground	Co-Producer, director, writer
2017	Born on the Bayou	Producer, director, writer
2013	MRGOing, GOing, Gone	Co-director, co-producer, co-writer
2011	No One Ever Went Hungry: Cajun Food Traditions Today	Director, writer, producer
2009	In the Spirit: The Documentary Photography of Michael P. Smith	Director, writer, producer
2009	We Live to Eat: New Orleans’ Love Affair with Food	Director, writer, producer
2003	A Common Pot: Creole Cooking on Cane River	Director, writer, producer
