= Angelo Brocato's =

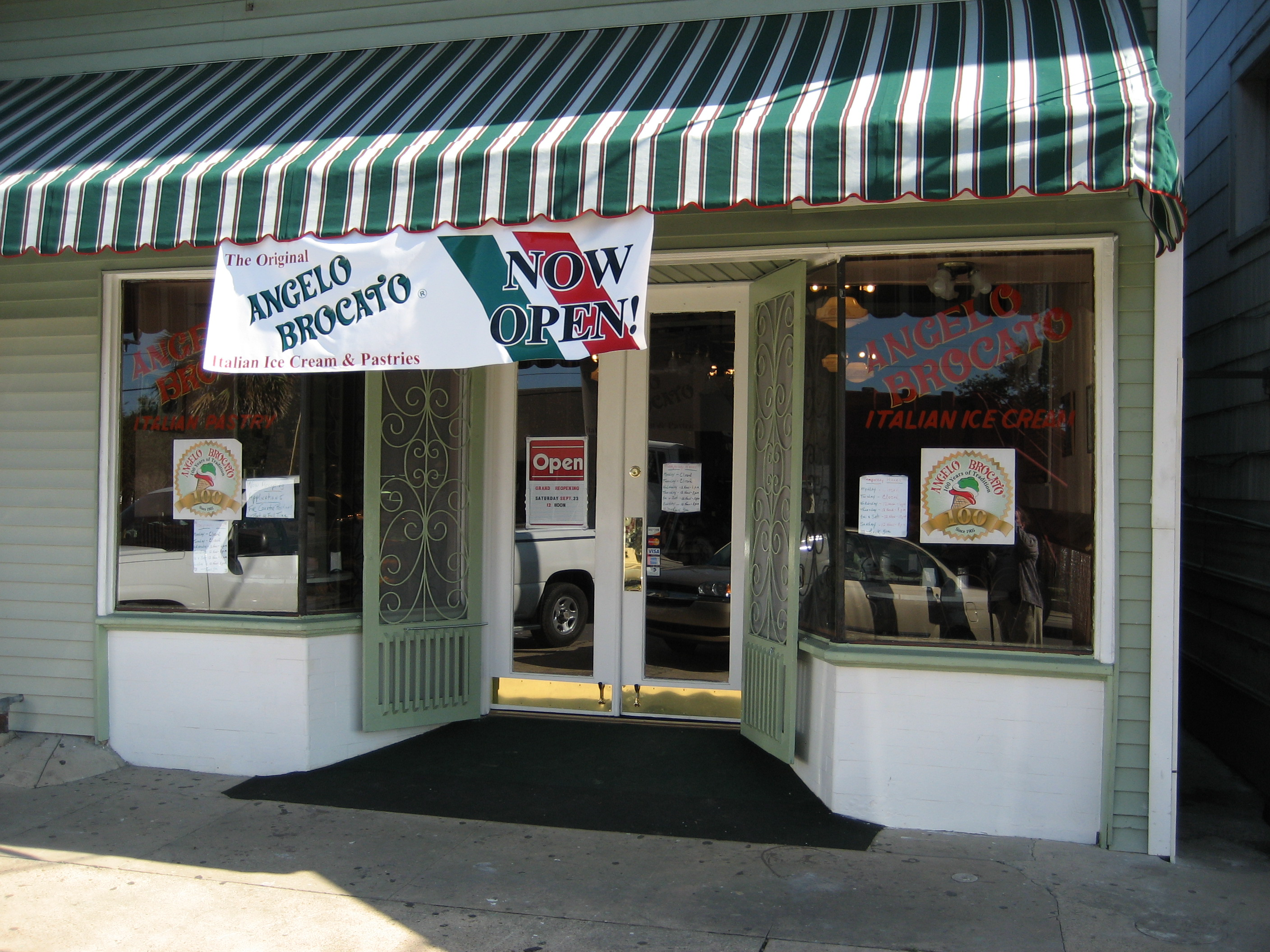
- Brocato's reopening in 2006 after Hurricane Katrina
- Interactive map of Angelo Brocato's

Restaurant information
- Established: 1905; 121 years ago
- Food type: Ice cream and desserts
- Location: 214 N. Carrollton Avenue, New Orleans, Louisiana, 70119, United States
- Coordinates: 29.9758°N 90.0990°W
- Website: www.angelobrocatoicecream.com

Angelo Brocato's Italian Ice Cream Parlor (often called Brocato's) is a family-owned ice cream parlor located in the Mid-City neighborhood of New Orleans, Louisiana. Founded in 1905, it is regarded as a New Orleans institution. Severely damaged by flooding after Hurricane Katrina, its 2006 reopening was reported as a significant advance in the rebuilding of the Mid-City area.

== History ==
Angelo Brocato was born in Cefalù, in Sicily, and at the age of 12 became an apprentice at an ice cream shop in Palermo. He later came to the United States; after opening a small ice cream store on Decatur Street, in 1905 he opened a larger ice cream parlor in the 500 block of Ursulines Street in the French Quarter. In 1921 the establishment moved to a larger space at 617 Ursulines, a white-tiled space with ceiling fans, modeled after fashionable parlors in Palermo. (The pastry and coffee shop Croissant d'Or now occupies this site, complete with its tiled walls.) This area of the French Quarter was an ethnic Italian neighborhood at the time, but the Italian population moved away over the years.

Angelo Brocato died in 1946. The business continued under his wife and children. Angelo Brocato, Jr, died in 1982; the store is now run by his son, Arthur Brocato, along with other family members.

The Ursulines store remained open until 1981; Brocato's also maintained a presence on Jackson Square for some years thereafter. The present location in Mid-City, near the corner of North Carrollton Avenue and Canal Street, was purchased in 1978.

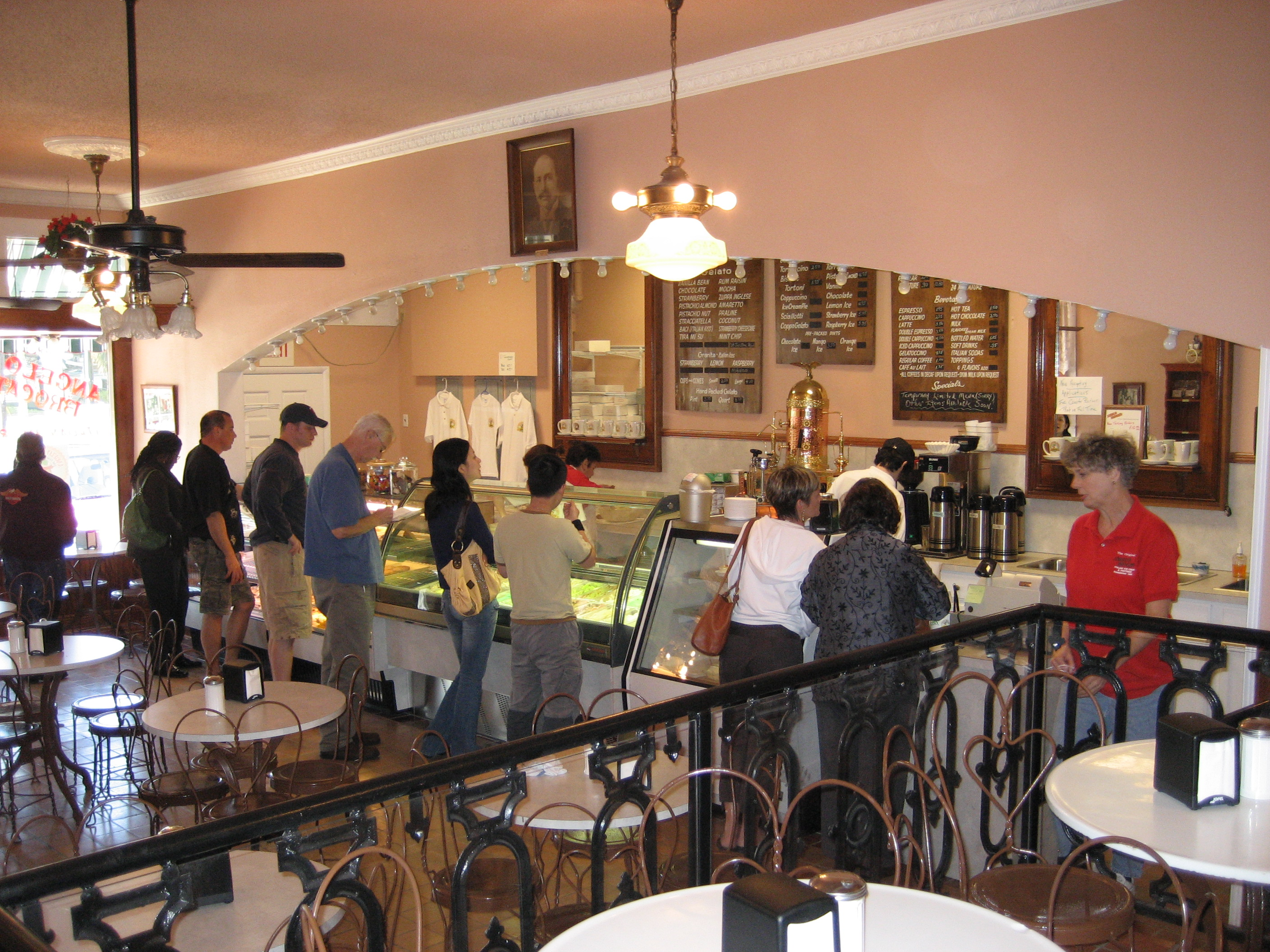
Brocato's interior, February 2007

Brocato's expanded its facilities in 2003 and celebrated its centennial in July 2005. Two months later, Brocato's Mid-City neighborhood found itself under five feet of water when the city's flood control systems failed after Hurricane Katrina. The store was severely damaged and for a time it was reported that it might not return. The store did finally reopen in September 2006. Welcomed by large crowds, the reopening was reported as an important step in the rebuilding of the Mid-City neighborhood.

In 2007, the Chef John Folse Culinary Institute at Nicholls State University gave the staff and owners of Brocato's its Lafcadio Hearn Award, which "honors individuals who have had a long-term, positive influence on Louisiana and U.S. cuisine and culture".

In the pilot episode of the HBO television series Treme, set in New Orleans three months after Hurricane Katrina, the character Creighton Bernette declines an offer of lemon ice at another (fictional) restaurant, saying that he would feel disloyal to eat lemon ice anywhere else while Brocato's was still closed. In the first episode of the second season, set in November 2006, Bernette's wife and daughter are shown eating, and talking with the real-life Angelo Brocato III, at the now-reopened Brocato's.

== Desserts ==
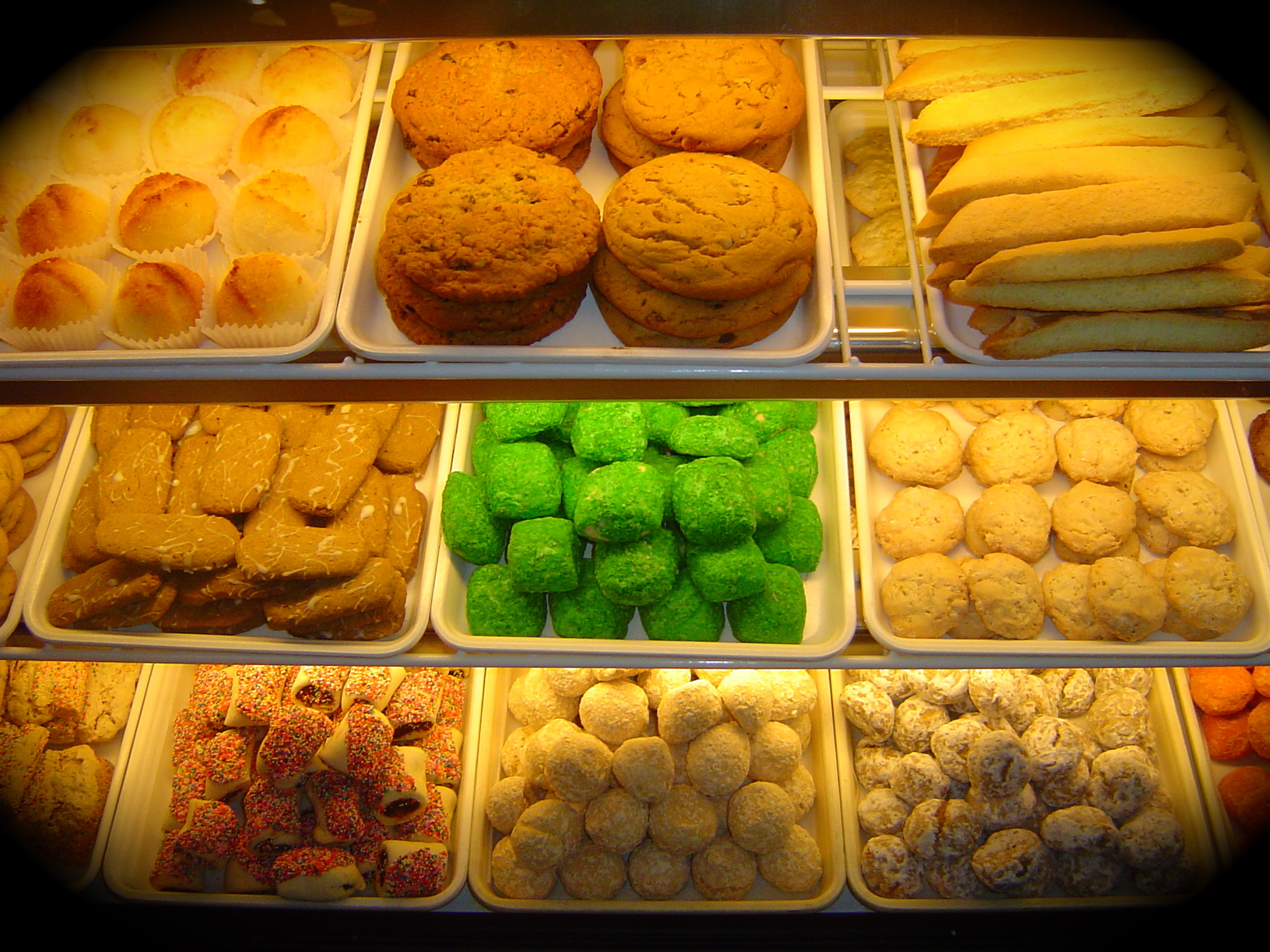
Italian cookies on display at Brocato's 2006 reopening

Angelo Brocato's first product was torroncino, a cinnamon-almond gelato. Brocato's still serves it in the same sliced-block form as in 1905. The business now sells a variety of gelati, Italian ices, cannoli, cookies, and other desserts. According to the Brocato's website, lemon ice is the "best-seller".
