= Ruth Fertel =

American businesswoman (1927–2002)

- Born: Ruth Ann Udstad; February 5, 1927; New Orleans, Louisiana
- Died: April 16, 2002 (aged 75); New Orleans, Louisiana
- Resting place: Metairie Cemetery
- Education: Louisiana State University
- Occupations: Restaurateur: founder, Ruth's Chris Steak House
- Years active: 1965–2002
- Spouse: Rodney Fertel (m. 1948; div. 1958)
- Children: 2 sons, including Randy Fertel

Ruth Ann Udstad Fertel (February 5, 1927 – April 16, 2002) was a Louisiana businesswoman best known as the founder of Ruth's Chris Steak Houses, which was founded in 1965.

== Early life and teaching ==
Ruth Ann Udstad was born into a poor family of Norwegian, Alsatian and Croatian descent in New Orleans, Louisiana. Her grandfather was born in Trondheim, Norway and emigrated to the United States where he became an engineer, and her mother was of mixed Alsatian-French and Croatian descent. Her father worked as an insurance salesman, and her mother was a kindergarten teacher. In 1932, during the Great Depression, she and her family relocated to her mother's birthplace, the community of Homeplace in Plaquemines Parish, which was about 60 miles from New Orleans. (Note: some sources claim she was either born or grew up in Happy Jack, Louisiana, also in Plaquemines.)

She skipped several grades in elementary school, and graduated at age 15. The family used the money from her brother Sig's World War Two G.I. Bill benefits to send her to Louisiana State University in Baton Rouge at 15, from where she graduated at age 19 with honors in chemistry and physics.

In 1946, Udstad obtained a job teaching at McNeese State University in Lake Charles. She left after two semesters.

On October 2, 1948, she married Rodney Fertel, who lived in Baton Rouge and shared her love of horses, and they had two sons, Jerry and Randy. In 1951, they opened a racing stable in Baton Rouge. Ruth earned a thoroughbred trainer's license, making her the first female horse trainer in Louisiana. Ruth and Rodney divorced in 1958. Rodney failed in the 1969 mayoral election in New Orleans as "The Gorilla Man", often wearing a gorilla suit to campaign events, championing the cause of renovating the Audubon Zoo.

Unable to support herself and her teenage sons on her alimony payments, she initially supplemented her income by making drapes out of her own home. In 1961, she took a job as a lab technician for physician-scientist George E. Burch at the Tulane University School of Medicine, earning $4,800 a year.

== Restaurateur ==
=== Chris' Steak House (1965–1976) ===
In 1965 Fertel, realizing she needed to earn more money to send her sons to college, found a classified ad in the Times-Picayune offering a restaurant for sale--the original Chris Steak House, a 60-seat restaurant at 1100 North Broad St, New Orleans. When she realized that it had opened on February 5, 1927, the day she was born, she took this as an omen. Ignoring the advice of her banker, lawyer, and friends, she mortgaged her house to purchase the restaurant despite knowing nothing about the restaurant business. She initially planned to raise just $18,000 to cover the purchase price, until it was pointed out to her that she would need an additional $4,000 to cover the cost of renovations and food. On her first day, May 24, 1965, she sold 35 steaks at $5 each. Within six months, she had made over double her annual salary from her previous job.

Fertel personally took a hand in every part of the business. She had to teach herself how to butcher steak, and despite being just five-foot-two and 110-pounds, would saw up 30-pound short loins by hand until she could afford an electric band saw. She staffed her restaurant with single mothers, saying that they were hard workers and reliable. For many years, Chris Steak House was the only upscale restaurant in New Orleans with an all-female wait staff. From the beginning her restaurant attracted local politicians as well as athletes, businessmen and reporters. Local celebrities like Fats Domino were regulars.

=== Ruth's Chris Steak House (1976 onwards) ===
Ruth's Chris Steakhouse logo

In early 1976, shortly after signing a new ten-year lease on the restaurant, a fire ruined the property. Fertel had recently acquired a second property nearby to rent out as party space. Within seven days, she had relocated the restaurant to its new location a few blocks away at 711 Broad Street and re-opened it, expanding to 160 seats in the process. The sales agreement prevented her from using the original name at any other address, so she named the new restaurant Ruth's Chris Steak House. She admitted later to Fortune Magazine that "I've always hated the name, but we've always managed to work around it." Political reporter Rosemary James noted that she "would not have missed a Friday before a major election at Ruth's Chris Steak House. That was the place to be if you wanted to get some scoops." Fertel bought two shotgun houses behind the restaurant, remodeled and connected them, and lived there for the rest of her life.

The same year, Fertel agreed to issue her first franchise. The first franchised restaurant was opened in 1977 by a loyal customer, Thomas J. "T. J." Moran (c. 1931-2015), in Baton Rouge, who went on to open several more franchised Ruth's Chris locations, TJ Ribs, and Ruffino's restaurants in Baton Rouge. Fertel noted, "All our franchisees were people who had eaten at one time or another in one of our restaurants. We never looked for franchisees. They came to us." The chain expanded rapidly over the next two decades, with over 80 locations in the US and overseas, and earning Fertel a number of accolades as an entrepreneur, and the epithet The First Lady of American Restaurants or The Empress of Steak.

She continued to run the Ruth's Chris business throughout her life. In 1997, the year she turned 70, she personally visited 42 of her restaurants to "smell out how they're doing." When she fell ill in 1999, she sold the chain to Madison Dearborn Partners of Chicago, Illinois.

== Death ==
A smoker for more than fifty years, she was diagnosed with lung cancer in 2000 and died two years later in 2002, at age 75. She was buried in Metairie Cemetery, in a lavish mausoleum she and her friend and business partner, Lana Duke, had commissioned in 1995, and which cost over $500,000. The granite building, on a square 27-foot plot, has black columns and stained glass windows featuring angels and the words "It's A Wonderful World". The Fertel-Duke mausoleum can hold six, and is intended to have Fertel family on one side and Duke family on the other. It was designed by the art department at Duke's advertising company. In 1999, Fertel and Duke held a party for over 150 guests to mark the completion of the structure. The event was presided over by Father Bob Massett, who blessed the crowd with a sprinkling of beer.

== Honors and awards ==
Her many awards include:

- 1992 – Regional Entrepreneur of the Year, Inc. Magazine
- 1995 – Entrepreneur of the Year, Horatio Alger Association
- 1999 Lafcadio Hearn Award, presented by the Chef John Folse Culinary Institute
- 2001 – Ella Brennan Savoir Faire Award
- DiRōNA (Distinguished Restaurants of North America) Hall of Fame Member
- Executive of the Year, Restaurants and Institutions Magazine
- Restaurant Business High Performance Leadership Award

== Legacy and philanthropy ==
During her lifetime, she was known for her charitable work. In 1965, when Hurricane Betsy hit New Orleans, she was left without power, and realized that the food in her restaurant was in danger of spoiling. She cooked everything and provided free steak meals to disaster workers and victims in the local area. She paid for the education of numerous children, provided counseling for women starting businesses, and contributed to local schools.

The Ruth U. Fertel Foundation, established in her will, supports education in Louisiana through programs designed to serve students from kindergarten through college. It gave away $1.2 million in 2006 after Hurricane Katrina.

The Ruth U. Fertel Culinary Arts Center at Nicholls State University in Thibodaux, Louisiana, is a planned expansion of the Chef John Folse Culinary Institute. It will include a student-operated restaurant, six kitchens, a commissary, an auditorium, a computer lab and several classrooms. The historic Rienzi-Levert house will house offices and provide accommodations for receptions and other special events.

The annual Ruth Fertel Keeper of the Flame Award is made jointly by the Southern Foodways Alliance and the Fertel Foundation, and honors an unsung hero or heroine who has made a great contribution to food. The award was first made in 2000. The honoree receives a monetary award and a documentary film is made about them.

Honorees include:

- 2000 J.C. Hardaway – pitmaster, Memphis, TN
- 2001 Ed Scott – catfish farmer, Drew, MS
- 2002 James Willis – pitmaster, Memphis, TN
- 2003 Bill Best – bean and tomato farmer, Berea, KY
- 2004 Martha Hawkins – restaurant owner, Montgomery, AL
- 2005 Martin Sawyer – bartender, New Orleans, LA
- 2006 Tommy Ward – oysterman, Apalachicola, FL
- 2007 Elizabeth Scott – tamale maker, Greenville, MS
- 2008 Earl Cruze – dairy farmer, Knoxville, TN
- 2009 Geno Lee – restaurant owner, Jackson, MS
- 2010 Peter Nguyen – on behalf of Gulf Coast Vietnamese fishing communities, MS
- 2011 Hardy Farms – peanut farm in Hawkinsville, GA
- 2012 Helen Turner — pitmistress of Helen's Bar-B-Q in Brownsville, TN
- 2013 Alzina Toups — operates Alzina's, a Cajun dining restaurant in Galliano, LA
- 2014 Goren "Red Dog" Avery — 30-year professional waiter, Birmingham, AL
- 2015 Phila Hach — caterer, innkeeper, and author, Nashville, TN
- 2016 David Shields — historian, University of South Carolina, Columbia, SC
- 2017 Laura Patricia Ramírez — tortilleria owner, Lexington, KY
- 2018 Adrian Miller — author, Denver, CO
- 2019 Felton Hurst — restaurant owner, Kenner, LA
- 2020 Hanan Shabazz — restaurateur and activist, Asheville, NC
