= Jan Gilbert (visual artist) =

American visual artist (born 1953)

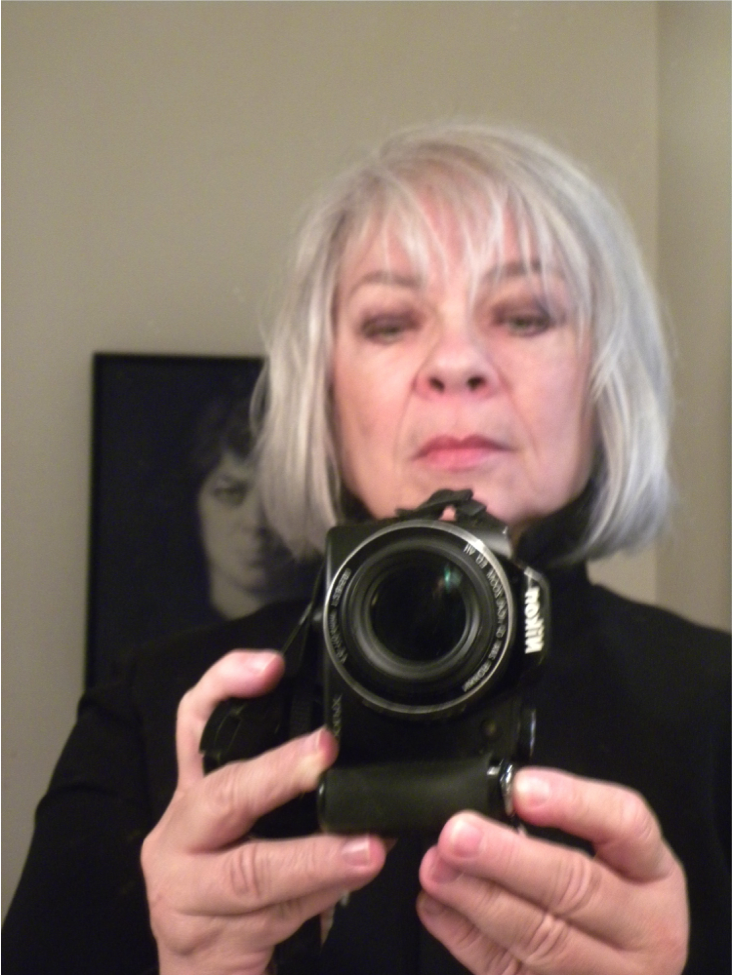
- Born: June 28, 1953 (age 73)
- Known for: Installation art, mixed media, public art
- Notable work: Goodbye Dad, Biography of a House, the VESTIGES Project

Jan Gilbert (born June 28, 1953) is an American visual artist, curator, and educator based in New Orleans. Since the 1980s, she has been known for her interdisciplinary and multi-media works that incorporate a variety of found objects. In a review of her Threshold exhibition, writer D. Eric Bookhardt wrote: “Gilbert’s exploration of an ordinary, even tawdry reality dissects not merely the images, but the mechanics of perception along with our assumptions about art, objects, and reality.”

Gilbert's work has been shown in galleries, museums, public art installations, and other venues both across the U.S. and abroad. Gilbert has been recognized with a number of awards, including individual artist fellowships from the Pollock-Krasner Foundation, Southern Arts Federation and National Endowment for the Arts, Louisiana Division of the Arts, Contemporary Arts Museum Houston, and Art Matters. Her projects have also been supported by grants from the NEA and Rockefeller Initiative for Interdisciplinary Artists, the Andy Warhol Foundation for the Visual Arts, Ford Foundation, and National Association of Artists' Organizations, among others.

== Early life ==
Jan Gilbert was born in New Orleans in 1953 to Helen Basilo and Charlie Gilbert and grew up in the Lakeview neighborhood of New Orleans. As a child, Gilbert's mother encouraged her to explore journaling with images, as well as ceramics and collages; Gilbert also learned sewing from her maternal grandmother, a trained seamstress; Gilbert credits these early skills as foundational for her development as an interdisciplinary mixed-media artist.

After receiving her bachelor's degree from University of New Orleans in 1980, Gilbert went on to earn a Master of Fine Arts in Painting from Tulane University in 1982.

== Art and career ==
Gilbert is known for her interdisciplinary mixed-media work, incorporating found objects, painting, printmaking, photography, and installation to create both two-dimensional and three-dimensional works of varying sizes. Gilbert has stated that her desire to use found objects in art pieces manifested during childhood, which led to her building the vast personal archive that has provided foundation for many of her works.

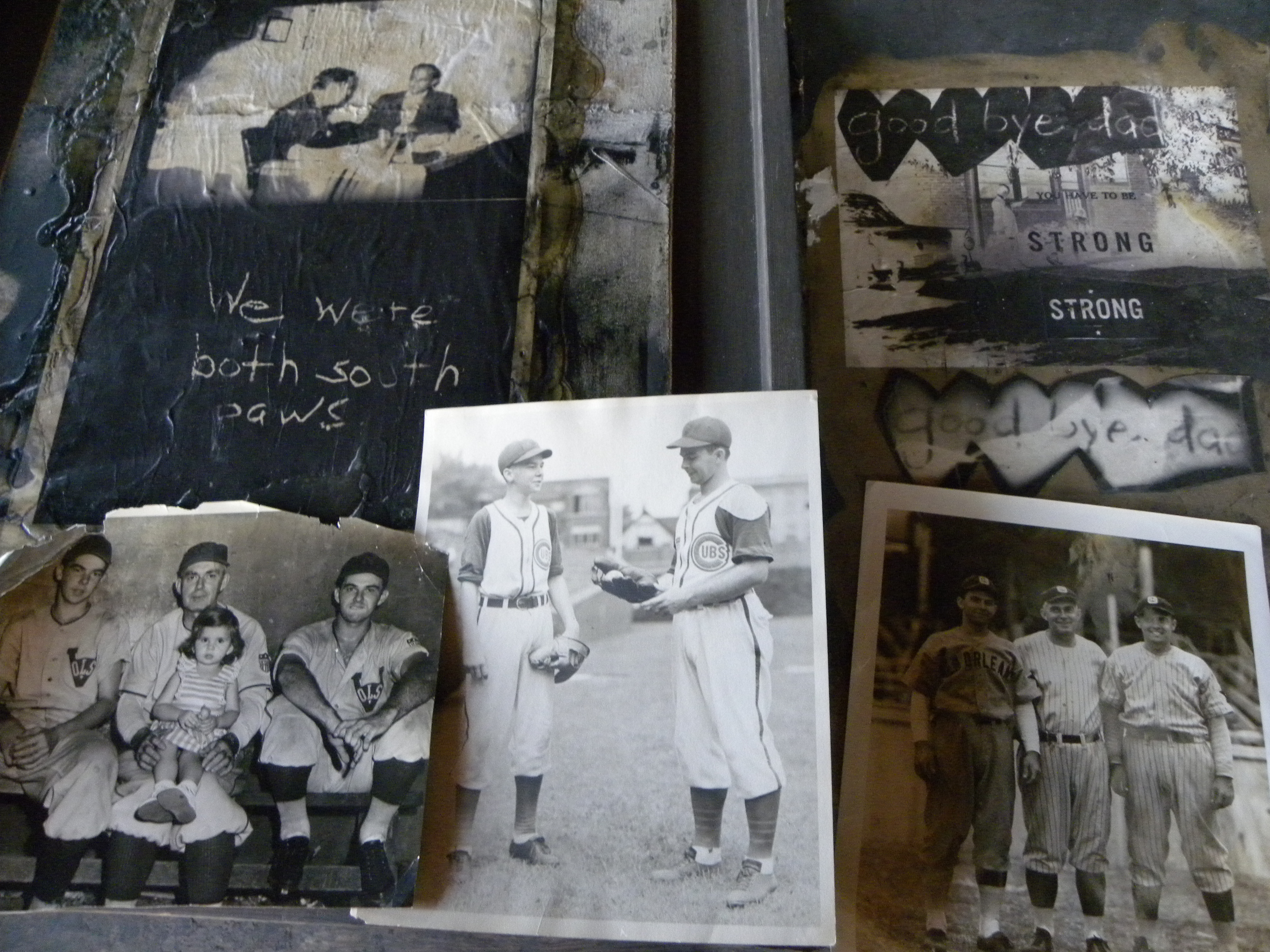
"Family photographs used to consider art pieces on family history," 1940-1997, Jan Gilbert. Photographic collage

Memory, loss, and transition are major themes throughout Gilbert's work. Gilbert's art is noted for its exploration of deeply personal subjects while simultaneously incorporating an ambiguity that one reviewer described as "mixed messages" that prompt viewers into considering their own experiences while interpreting Gilbert's work. In 1989, Gilbert debuted Beuys of Summer (also known as Goodbye, Dad), a series memorializing her late father Charlie, who played professional baseball for the Brooklyn Dodgers and Chicago Cubs; the title is a reference to both The Boys of Summer by Roger Kahn and German artist/theorist Joseph Beuys. Gilbert also has been known to “embalm” her photographic/collage work with wax-like acrylics to emphasize the preservation of memories held in the object.

Gilbert is also an educator, curator, and activist. Gilbert has taught at both Tulane University and Loyola University; she has also previously served as a grant panelist for the National Endowment for the Arts. Gilbert has curated a number of exhibitions over her career, including the 2019 exhibition "Art of the City: Postmodern to Post-Katrina” at the Historic New Orleans Collection; the show was developed as part of New Orleans' tricentennial celebration and featured the work of seventy five artists which included Zarouhie Abdalian, Luis Cruz Azaceta, Harold Baquet, Willie Birch, Dawn DeDeaux, Douglas Bourgeois, and Rontherin Ratliff, among others. From 2012 to 2013, Gilbert served as Interim Director of Visual Art for the Contemporary Arts Center (CAC) in New Orleans. The following year, Gilbert received a 2013 Community Arts award from the Arts Council of New Orleans, which recognizes “artistic excellence, sustained contributions, unusual achievements, perseverance, and a deep commitment to the arts and the cultural community."

=== Exhibitions ===
Since the 1980s, both Gilbert's solo work and collaborative projects have exhibited both nationally and abroad, including at venues such as the New Orleans Museum of Art, Newcomb Art Museum, Rebecca Randall Bryan Gallery at Coastal Carolina University, 571 Projects in New York, Arthur Roger Gallery, the Museum of Contemporary Art Skopje in Macedonia, among many others; her installation work has been presented in locations that have included a fire-damaged 19th century house in New Orleans, her childhood home post-Hurricane Katrina, a former Woolworth's in Tacoma, Washington, and an art route on the North Groningen coastline in the Netherlands.

Along with her dedication to public art installations, Gilbert's exhibitions have been noted for elements of ritual and performance, both of which became more explicit motifs in her presentations during the 1990s following numerous personal experiences with death and dying. In one instance, Gilbert honored a close friend lost to AIDS with Light in the Head (1995), a project that featured Gilbert making and burning candles while melding images of her friend into the wax over the course of eight hours on World AIDS Day. In 1999, while battling stage four breast cancer, Gilbert was inspired to create her Offerings series after a friend asked for objects to leave at the top of Mount Rainier as a "gift to the gods" for healing; Gilbert's offering consisted of a banana leaf from Jackson Square hand-stitched to create a pocket, which she then filled with locks of hair and cremated remains of loved ones.

In 2012, The Front art gallery in New Orleans hosted an exhibition entitled 30 Years / 30 Blocks, which presented a partial retrospective of Gilbert's past public artworks juxtaposed with future plans for new ones.

=== Collaborations ===
In addition to her solo work, Gilbert has been known for her frequent pursuit of collaborative projects. In 1984, Gilbert joined with fellow Tulane alumnae to form the VESTIGES Project, a New Orleans artist and writer collective focused on exploring the city's culture through image and text. In the thirty years since its inception, VESTIGES has produced a variety of exhibitions and art installations both in New Orleans and around the U.S. In 2008, the VESTIGES Project celebrated its 25-year anniversary with LOSS. RITUAL. RELIC. Residue: The Archive, a living archive installation curated by Gilbert and held at the Newcomb College Center for Research on Women; the exhibition showcased the timeline of VESTIGES, as well as artwork and methodology statements from a variety of New Orleans artists who had previously participated in VESTIGES.

Following the devastation of Hurricane Katrina, Gilbert initiated the VESTIGES Think Tank, an umbrella project and artist residency with the Contemporary Arts Center of New Orleans; it was through the VESTIGES Think Tank that Gilbert co-developed HOME, New Orleans, a neighborhood-based, arts-focused project that explored the city's various iterations of “home” in an effort to promote civic engagement and rebuild community in the wake of Hurricane Katrina. As part of HOME, New Orleans project, Gilbert returned to her childhood neighborhood of Lakeview and collaboratively developed a bus tour of site-specific installations and performances around the neighborhood, entitled LakeviewS. For her stop on the LakeviewS tour, Gilbert created “Biography of a House,” which consisted of a 300 ft ribbon of family photos wrapped around the flood line of her mother's home, accompanied by a sound installation of home tape recordings from Gilbert's childhood.

Gilbert has regularly collaborated with her husband, oral historian and documentary filmmaker Kevin J. McCaffrey on a variety of endeavors revolving around community, environmental issues, and culture. Many of Gilbert and McCaffrey's projects explore the aftermath of Hurricane Katrina on New Orleans, which have ranged from art exhibitions to guest editing events produced through the VESTIGES Project arts collective.

Since the 1980s, Gilbert has co-contributed to “Masters of their Conditions,” an ongoing academic research and applications development project conducted by trans-cultural psychiatry scholar Dr. Jacques Arpin. The study examines cultural rituals as performance and proposes a therapy model built on performance-based techniques, with Gilbert co-assisting with research on Cajun culture as a point of reference on how communities cope with natural disasters. Both Gilbert and her husband have joined Dr. Arpin in presenting the study at international academic symposiums. Gilbert and Arpin also collaboratively presented an installation of archival assemblages of image and text from "Masters of their Conditions" research sessions as part of the 2009 TransCultural Exchange Conference's "Here, There, & Everywhere: Anticipating Art for the Future" exhibitions.
