= Robert W. Tebbs =

American architectural photographer

Robert William Tebbs
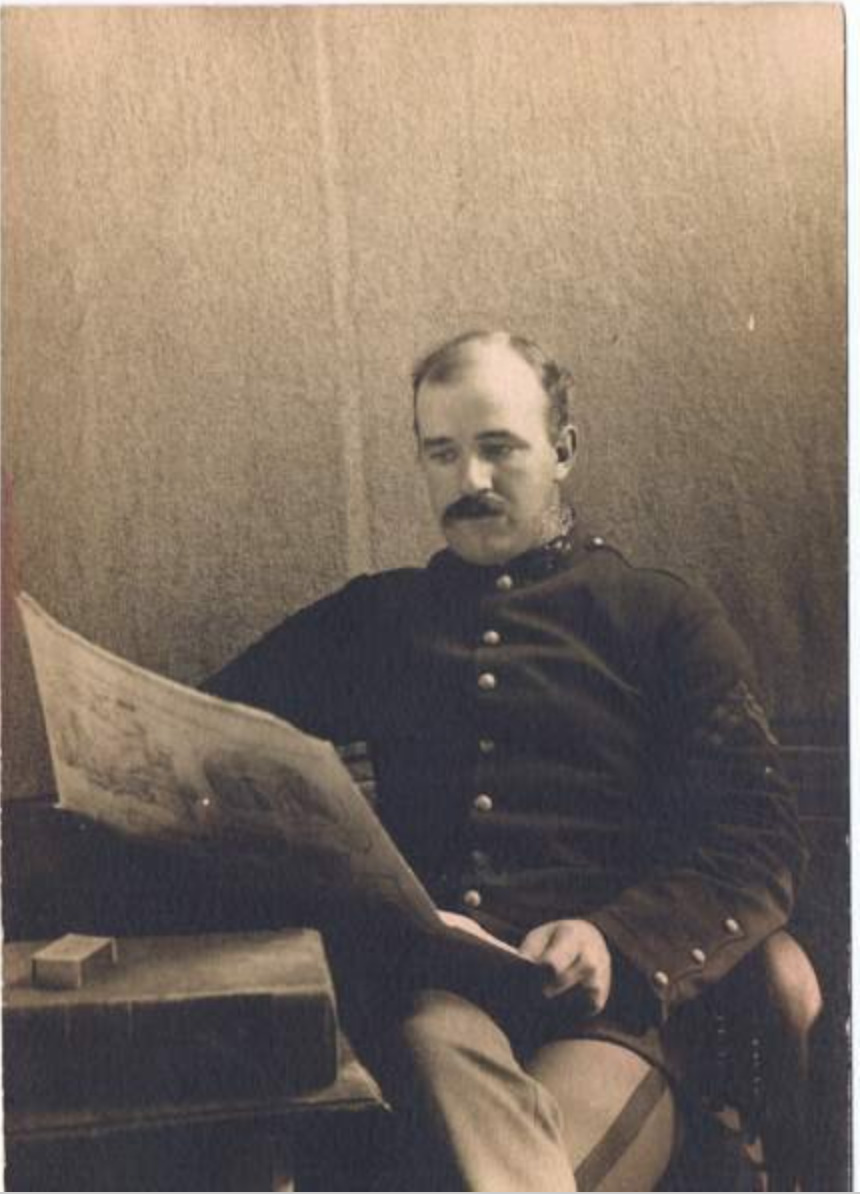
- Tebbs in his Marine Corps uniform, circa 1900
- Born: August 17, 1875; Newcastle-under-Lyme, Staffordshire, England
- Died: May 23, 1945 (aged 69); Plainfield, New Jersey
- Occupation: Photojournalist
- Notable work: Photo-essay of the plantations of Louisiana

Robert W. Tebbs (1875–1945) was an American photographer professionally active in the early to mid-twentieth century who specialized in architectural photography. Tebbs is most noted for his 1926 historical photo-essay of the plantations of Louisiana.

While much of Tebbs's photography work in Louisiana remained unpublished during his lifetime, historian Richard Lewis published a book of Tebbs's work in 2011.

== Early life and immigration ==
Robert W. Tebbs was born on August 17, 1875, in Newcastle-under-Lyme, Staffordshire, England, to parents Charles Harding Tebbs and Lillian Marie Tebbs (née D'Almaine). He had two older siblings. His family immigrated to the United States in 1888, initially settling in Oakland, California, and then later Berkeley, California. Shortly thereafter, his parents adopted a child, Lillian Yeo, who later became noted as a deaconess in the Episcopal Church.

In 1896, Tebbs joined the United States Marine Corps, serving during the Spanish-American War and mostly serving at the Mare Island military base.

In 1907, Tebbs married fellow British immigrant Jeanne Spitz. The couple settled in Plainfield, New Jersey while Tebbs worked in New York City. They had two children, Charles D. Tebbs (born in 1911) and Robert Tebbs (born in 1919).

== Career ==
Beginning in 1900 after completion of his military career, Tebbs was employed as a photographer for the Hearst Newspapers, photographing sporting events. Tebbs worked as a freelance photojournalist at the time, taking on architectural themes, especially churches. He published in American Annual of Photography and also in the New York Times.

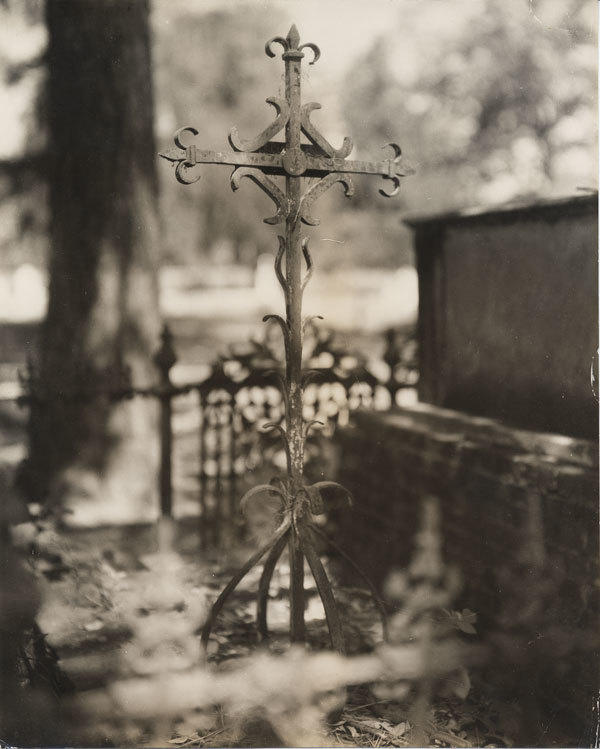
Wrought Iron Cross at Grand Coteau Cemetery in Louisiana, as photographed by Tebbs in 1926

Tebbs established various partnerships with other photographers. His first partnership started in 1910 when Tebbs became part of Tebbs-Hymans Photographs. By that time, Tebbs was specializing in architectural photography, which was timely with the early twentieth century building boom in the northeast United States. In 1913, the partnership published photographs of the Woolworth Building in the journal Architectural Record. One client, architect Cass Gilbert, presented several of Tebbs's photographs that were from the Tebbs-Hymans partnership at the École des Beaux-Arts in Paris, France. Around the same time, the partnership completed a photo-essay of the Grand Central Terminal. The partnership also took on photographic projects of notable homes.

In 1923, Tebbs and Charles E. Knell established a new photography business together. Their business, Tebbs & Knell, maintained their headquarters in New York City at prestigious locations, including 400 Fifth Avenue and 101 Park Avenue. Shortly thereafter, Tebbs began to travel so as to take on photographic projects outside of New York City. These included a significant project in South Carolina for architect Henry C. Hibbs, to photographically document his designs for the Scarritt College for Christian Workers. The partnership also photographed Kingwood Hall in Ohio. The photographic essay for the house resides in the Cleveland Public Library. They completed a photographic project for the Merchandise Mart in Chicago, Illinois. The Tebbs & Knell partnership promoted itself as "photographers to architects and decorators".

A set of 277 photographs from Tebbs & Knell of suburban homes was published in a 1931 issue of the journal Southern Architecture Illustrated, emphasizing homes in the southern United States.

=== Plantations of Louisiana ===
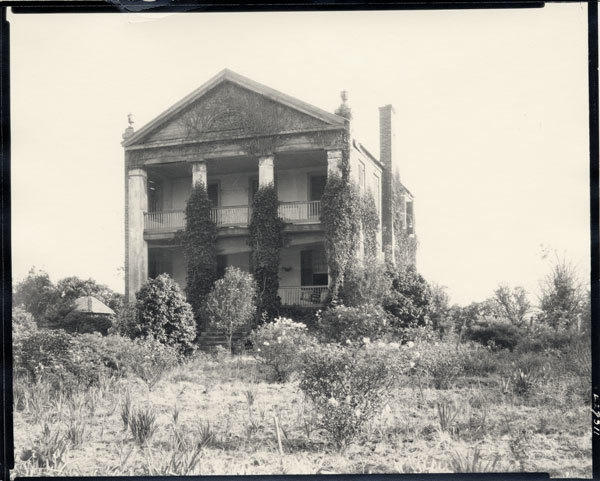
Hickory Hill Plantation in East Feliciana Parish, Louisiana, as photographed by Tebbs in 1926

In 1926, architectural historian Richard Koch of New Orleans commissioned Tebbs to conduct a photographic history of the plantations of Louisiana. The project was for the Louisiana portion of the "Octagon Project" of the American Institute of Architects, and Koch himself was commissioned for the Louisiana portion of the project by architectural scholar Charles Harris Whitaker. Tebbs traveled with his wife and with Koch throughout the state, photographing 97 plantation homes with approximately 400 images.

The early twentieth century was a time of decline and neglect of Louisiana's plantations home. Tebbs's photographic style of the homes reflect the sense of decay of the homes, photographic with natural light, making use of the picturesque style. Particularly illustrative of this style were Tebbs's photographs of the Hickory Hill Plantation in East Feliciana Parish, Louisiana. In his photographic essays he often strived to show the contrast between the grandeur of the plantation home versus the squalor of the slave quarters.

During the course of his 1926 project, Tebbs photographed other architecturally significant buildings in Louisiana besides plantation homes. Examples are Grace Episcopal Church in St. Francisville, Louisiana and the St. Francisville Masonic Temple.

Tebbs's project for Koch did not come to fruition due to economic hardships resulting from the 1929 Great Depression. A set of fourteen of Tebbs's plantation photographs was published in Pencil Points, which was a journal of the American Institute of Architects.

=== Late career ===
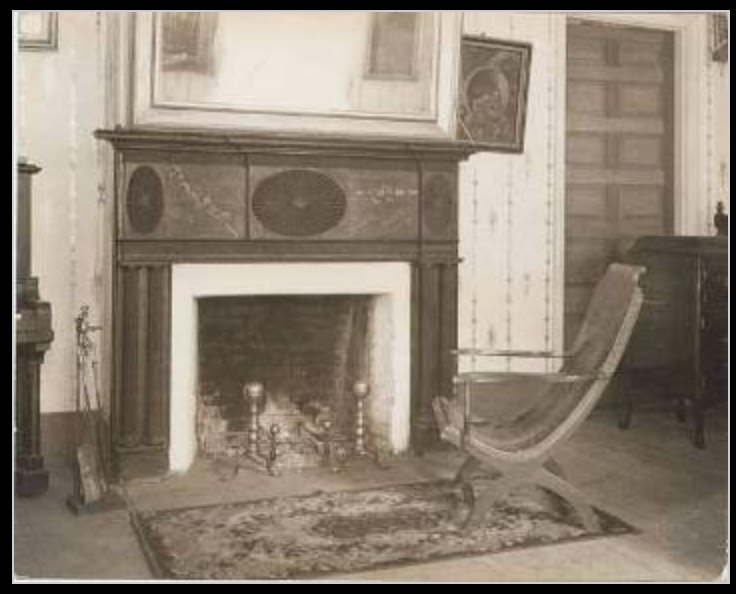
Indoor view of The Cottage, St. Francisville, as photographed by Tebbs in 1926

Following the end of his Louisiana plantations project, Tebbs worked from time-to-time as part of the Historic American Buildings Survey, which was funded by the Works Progress Administration. Through the Great Depression, Tebbs had fewer photographic projects and often worked alone.

Illness limited his further photographic endeavors, although he continued to conduct small photographic projects for the Mack Truck Company until his death in 1945.

== Personal life ==
Tebbs was an avid amateur musician, especially amateur chorus. He served for a time as an officer in the Oratorio Society of New York. He was also an active member of the Literary Society of New York.

In his hometown of Plainfield, New Jersey, Tebbs founded a Boy Scout Troop, was a member of the Plainfield Choral Society, and participated in the Plainfield Cricket Club.

== Legacy ==
Although the American Institute of Architects project that Tebbs was originally commissioned for was canceled before completion, fourteen of Tebbs's plantation photographs were published in 1938 in Pencil Points, a publication of the American Institute of Architects.

Tebbs's obituary published by the New York Times reported that his personal collection of architectural photographs was among the largest in the United States. In 1956, his widow Jeanne Tebbs sold his collection of architectural photographs to the Louisiana State Museum, where it continues to reside as of early 2022. It is known as the Robert W. Tebbs Collection.

External images
- Louisiana photos taken by Robert W. Tebbs
- Photos from the Robert W. Tebbs Collection, of the Louisiana Digital Collection

The Library of Congress maintains a set of his photographs, also known as the Robert W. Tebbs Collection, of approximately 1800 photographs and 2046 negatives.

In 2011 historian Richard A. Lewis published a book about Tebbs's project to photographically document the plantation homes of Louisiana includes 119 previously unpublished photographs. Fifty-two plantation homes and their surrounding grounds are subjects of the book.

== See also ==
- List of plantations in Louisiana

== Gallery ==
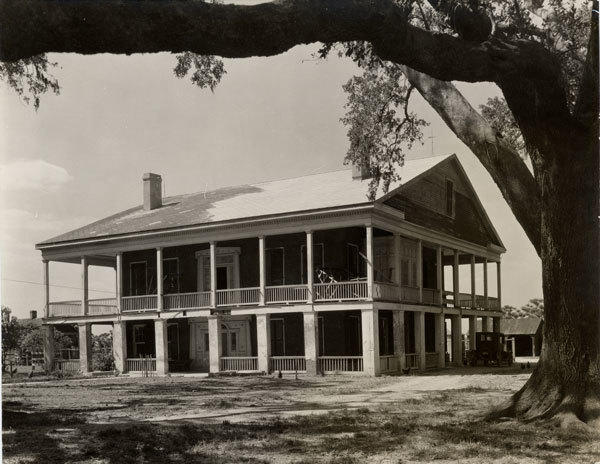
Rienzi Plantation House

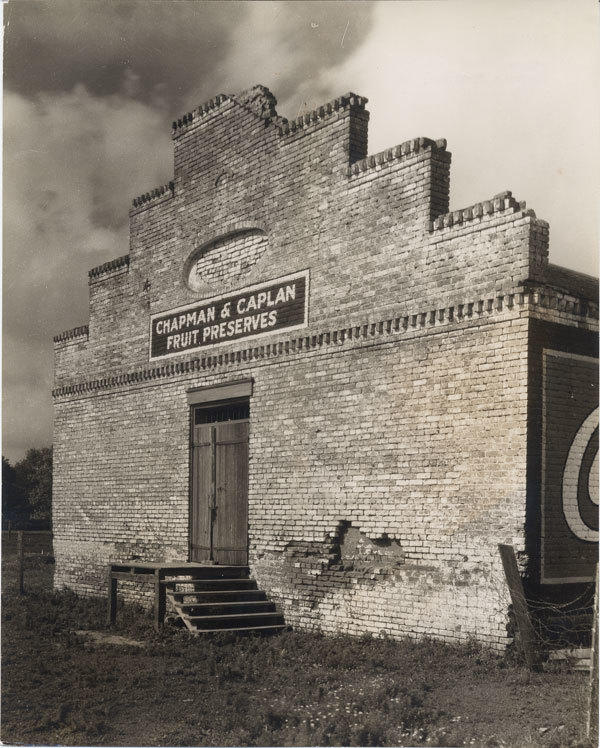
Plantation Store in Lafourche Parish, Louisiana

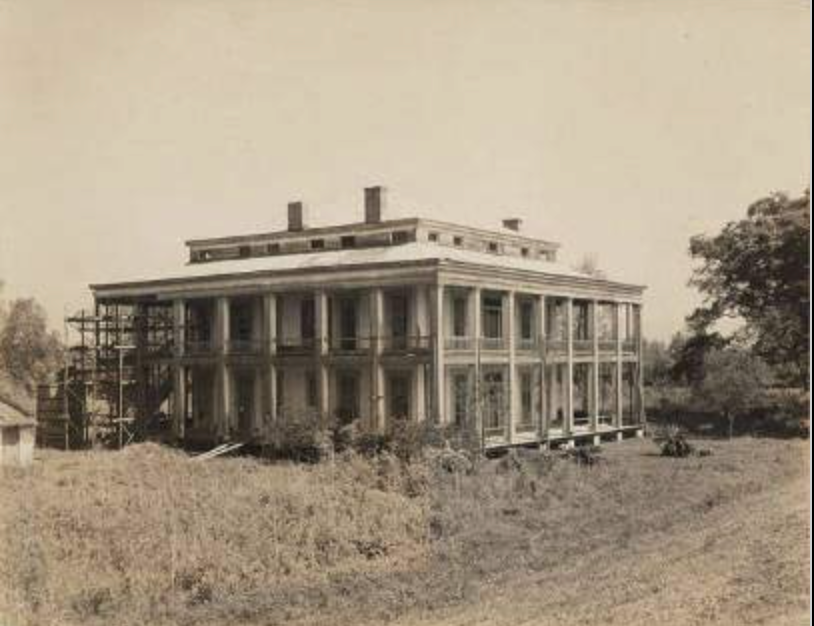
Belle Chasse Mansion in 1926

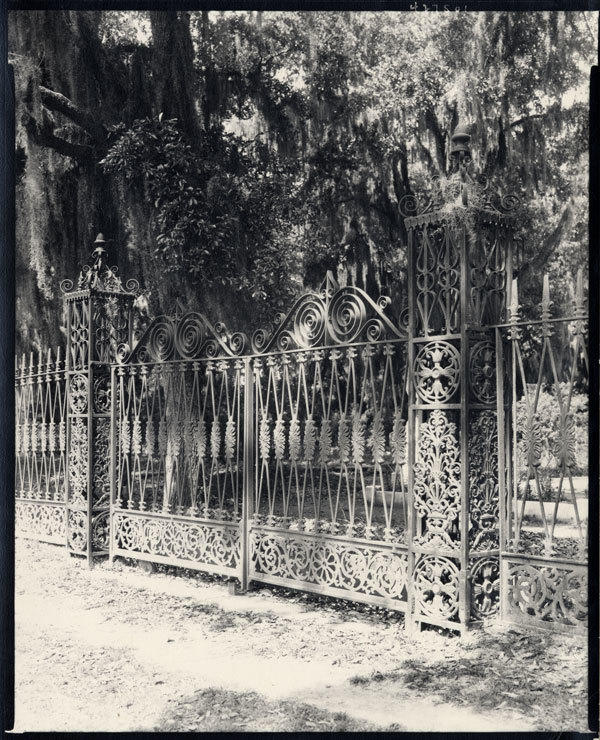
Wrought iron gate at Grace Episcopal Church in St. Francisville, Louisiana

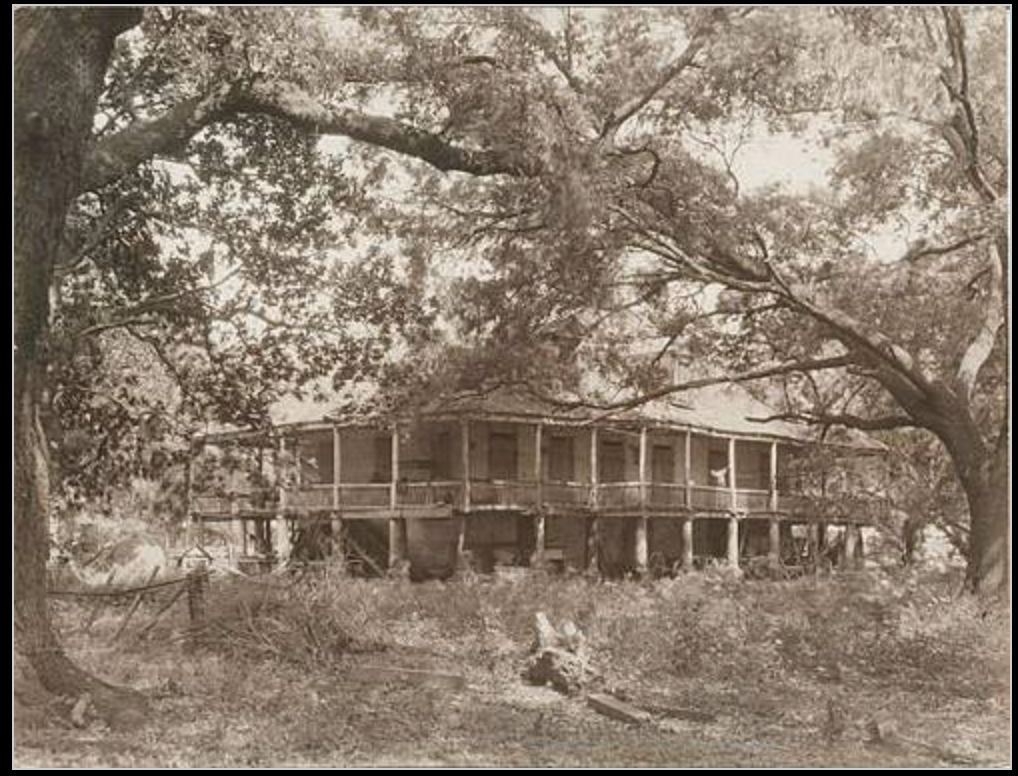
Elmwood Plantation of Louisiana as photographed in 1926, which was subsequently destroyed by fire
