= Randy Fertel =

American writer and philanthropist

- Born: New Orleans, Louisiana, U.S.
- Education: Harvard University (Ph.D.)
- Occupations: Writer; academic; philanthropist
- Relatives: Ruth Fertel (mother)
- Writing career
- Notable works: The Gorilla Man and the Empress of Steak: A New Orleans Family Memoir (2011); A Taste for Chaos: The Art of Literary Improvisation (2015); Winging It: Improv's Power & Peril in the Time of Trump (2024)

Randy Fertel is an American writer and philanthropist. His primary focus is improvisation, the arts, and the environment. He serves as president of the Fertel Foundation and the Ruth U. Fertel Foundation. He is the son of Ruth Fertel, founder of the Ruth's Chris Steakhouse restaurant chain.

== Early life and education ==
Fertel is from New Orleans, Louisiana. He holds a Ph.D. in English and American literature from Harvard University and has taught literature at institutions including Harvard, Tulane University, LeMoyne College, and the New School for Social Research.

== Publications ==
Fertel is the author of three books, The Gorilla Man and the Empress of Steak (2011), A Taste for Chaos (2015), and Winging It (2024).

His memoir The Gorilla Man and the Empress of Steak: A New Orleans Family Memoir was published in 2011 by the University Press of Mississippi.

In 2015, he published A Taste for Chaos: The Art of Literary Improvisation, a study of improvisational techniques in literature and the arts, with Spring Publications. Critical Studies in Improvisation wrote that A Taste for Chaos presents "a theory of improvisation as it relates to the history of literature," noting that "Fertel is the only writer to have attempted such a sweeping assessment of literature in the Western tradition." Jung Journal: Culture & Psyche called the book important in that it "offers a new and powerful multidisciplinary context for Jung's Red Book (2009), all the while providing a radical argument about the psyche and its arts."

His 2024 book, Winging It: Improv's Power & Peril in the Time of Trump, also from Spring Publications, discusses improvisation's cultural and political implications.

In 2018, he contributed a chapter, "Trickster, His Apocalyptic Brother, and a World's Unmaking: An Archetypal Reading of Donald Trump" to the Jung's Red Book for Our Time: Searching for Soul Under Postmodern Conditions, Vol. 2, edited by Murray Stein and Thomas Arzt.

Fertel's writing has been published in Smithsonian, The New York Times, The Washington Spectator, and The Kenyon Review. He has appeared on podcasts and public radio to discuss his books, New Orleans, and the subject of improvisation.

== Philanthropy ==
Fertel serves as president of the Fertel Foundation and the Ruth U. Fertel Foundation, organizations that support arts, education, and community initiatives primarily in New Orleans, such as the Edible Schoolyard New Orleans (ESYNOLA), a nonprofit program that integrates gardening and cooking education into local public schools. The Fertel Foundation, alongside The Nation Institute, co-founded the annual Ridenhour Prizes for Courageous Truth-telling. Fertel's foundations also support local cultural and educational projects.
