= Rienzi Plantation House =

Historic mansion in Louisiana, US

- U.S. National Register of Historic Places
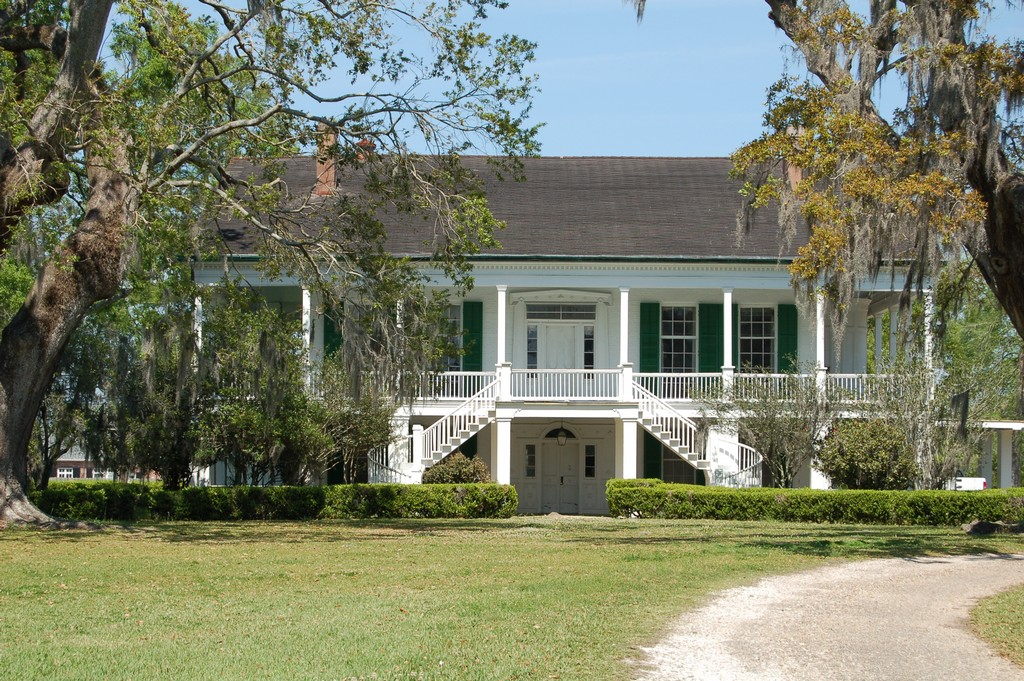

- Location within Louisiana Location within the United States
- Location: 215 East Bayou Road; Thibodaux, Louisiana
- Coordinates: 29°48′00″N 90°48′47″W
- Area: 3.5 acres (1.4 ha)
- Built: c.1840
- Architectural style: Greek Revival
- NRHP reference No.: 80001736
- Added to NRHP: May 31, 1980

Rienzi Plantation House is a historic mansion located at 215 East Bayou Road in Thibodaux, Louisiana.

While it gives the impression of dating to c.1840, it is believed that the house was built between 1814 and 1825.

Rienzi plantation house is located directly across Bayou Lafourche from the town of Thibodaux. Despite the proximity of a modern shopping center, the house enjoys a historic setting due to the large live oaks on the property. Two of the oaks are registered with the Live Oak Society.

The mansion was added to the National Register of Historic Places on May 31, 1980.

== Architecture ==
The house is significant both historically and architecturally and was built in the "American Style" with center hallways, exterior wall fireplaces with great emphasis placed on balance and symmetry. This is in contrast with the earlier "Creole Style" with rooms arranged en suite with no halls, interior fireplaces and the interior function of the room-defining the placement of windows and doors rather than a more symmetrical plan. However, Rienzi shows a transition from the early style with its primary floor being on the second level and the exposed rafters on the downstairs gallery. The house is thought to be built between 1814 and 1825 is almost square in plan with five bays on each side, measuring approximately 70' by 72'. It is built in the peripteral style, surrounded by galleries with brick pillars on the lower story and wooden pillars on the upper story. The ceilings of the first floor are 10' and 14' on the second story. The walls of the house are brick and lumber used for roof rafters, floor joists, etc. are thought to pit-sawn and employ timber framing techniques, i.e. mortise and tenon joints with pegs. The majority of the lumber is cypress with flooring made of long leaf pine. The most unique feature of the house are the central hallways placed in a cruciform plan on each floor. On the lower floor, the halls were originally open to the outside through brick arches, that not only provided access but structurally acted as a relieving or displacing arch, due to the weight of the brick structure. These have been enclosed with doorways in the early 1850s. It has been stated that the first floor was used to stable animals but with four fireplaces on the ground floor the use was for humans. The two front rooms on the upper floor have slip head windows.

It is believed that the house has had significant renovations around 1850, 1900 and 1940 as both style and technology motivated owners to make changes. The house is currently undergoing a restoration (beginning in 2012) with a focus restoring the house to its earlier look. Though the house has some Greek Revival detail, (it actually pre-dates that period) the style of the house has been called Tuscan Revival. The handsome double front staircase was probably added during the 1850s renovation though many believe it was added in the 1930s. Several photos beginning in the 1870s show the double staircase intact. The monumental door surrounds have diamond-shaped ornaments, sidelights and transoms. A modern kitchen wing is located to the rear of the house. Of the many plantation houses in the Lafourche Bayou region, Rienzi Plantation is the only example of the fully developed peripteral mode. Moreover, it is one of the very few examples in the Deep South of a plantation house with a cruciform hall plan.

== History ==
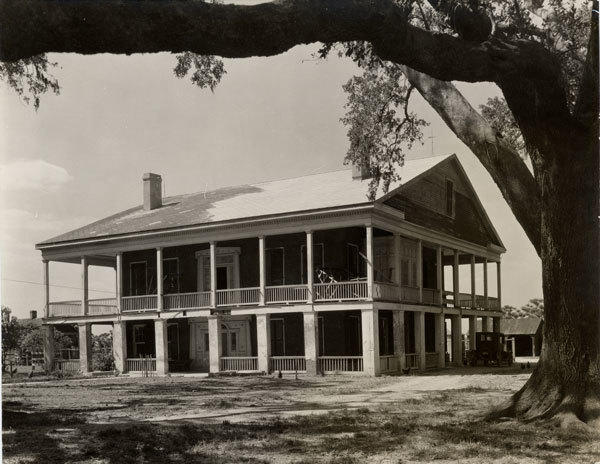
Rienzi Plantation House, as photographed by Robert W. Tebbs in 1926

Rienzi Plantation House sits on property that was part of the first Spanish Land grant of Henry Schuyler Thibodaux, the namesake of the City of Thibodaux. The grant was made by Baron Carondelet in approximately 1792. After the Louisiana purchase, Thibodaux confirmed that he both inhabited and cultivated the property for ten years prior to the purchase. There is some evidence that a two-story wooden four bay house existed adjacent to the existing house, which is believed to be Thibodaux's house. (Thibodaux well after the sale of the property became the 5th Governor of Louisiana.) In 1814 the plantation was sold to Henry Fields, a prominent businessman and architect. It is believed that Fields is responsible for the house that exists today, and his architectural skills enabled him to construct a house that exhibited non-typical features of houses of that time. In 1825. the plantation was sold to Henry Johnson, Governor of Louisiana at the time of his purchase. He sold the property to Thomas Bibb, the second governor of Alabama, in 1835, and it is under his ownership that the plantation was first called Rienzi. It is believed that the name comes from the novel and Wagner opera about the 14th-century Italian patriot that was extremely popular during the 1840s.

The next owner, Juan Ignacio de Egana, was probably the source of the romantic legend which has been widely publicized. The legend details that the house was constructed by Spanish architects at the request of Spanish Queen Maria Louisa as a possible retreat for her in the event of a Spanish defeat in the Napoleonic Wars. The legend has it that her agent, Juan Ygnacio de Egana, took possession of the home (after Louisiana was ceded to France and sold to the United States) and proceeded to live in the house for nearly fifty years. However, the conveyance records indicate that Juan Ygnacio de Egana, whatever his connection with the Queen, owned the plantation in 1851 and his estate sold the property to Richard Allen in 1861. The 1860 census lists the "Estate of J.Y. de Agana" as consisting of 2,799 acres and 306 slaves. Champomier in his sugar report calls this estate "Riensy Plantation." In 1859 this plantation produced 950 hogsheads of sugar, by far the most in Lafourche Parish.

Laborers on Rienzi were some of the first to strike during the fall of 1887 in a movement organized by the Knights of Labor in Thibodaux and the surrounding parishes. During the violence that ensued, Rienzi's overseer was shot in the face, though not severely injured. When white vigilantes went on a shooting spree to end the strike, three victims of the massacre died on the plantation's grounds.

In 1896 Emile Morvant and J. B. Levert bought the plantation in a joint partnership. Subsequently, J.B. Levert acquired the Morvants' interest in 1922 and formed the J.B Levert Land, Inc. In 2004 it was gifted to Nicholls State University and in 2012 purchased by the current owner. The house remains a private residence.

== See also ==
- National Register of Historic Places listings in Lafourche Parish, Louisiana

== Major bibliographical references ==
- "Legend Is House Built for Queen," Baton Rouge State Times, August 27, 1965.
- Menn, Joseph K., The Large Slaveholders of Louisiana, 1860. New Orleans: Pelican Publishing Co., 1964. pp. 262, 266–267.
- W. Darrell Overdyke, Louisiana Plantation Homes: Colonial and Ante-Bellum. New York: Architectural Book Publishing Co., 1965. p. 163.
- Price, Charles W. Jr., "Rienzi Mansion on Bayou Lafourche Relic of Intrigue? Lost Dreams and Empire," Progress, March 18, 1938, clipping in Rienzi Vertical File, Louisiana Room, LSU Library, Baton Rouge.
