= Chef John Folse Culinary Institute =

Culinary school within Nicholls State University

- Type: Public culinary institute
- Established: 1994; 32 years ago
- Parent institution: Nicholls State University
- Namesake: John Folse
- Students: Approximately 300
- Location: Thibodaux, Louisiana, United States
- Website: www.nicholls.edu/culinary

The Chef John Folse Culinary Institute (CJFCI) is a culinary arts school within Nicholls State University in Thibodaux, Louisiana, United States. Established in 1994 and named after chef John Folse, it is dedicated to the preservation and advancement of Louisiana's culinary heritage. The institute offers the only Bachelor of Science degree in culinary arts at a public university in Louisiana and was among the first four-year culinary degree programs at a U.S. public university when it received authorisation to grant baccalaureate degrees in 1997.

== History ==
The mission of CJFCI as envisioned by Chef Folse and former Nicholls President Donald Ayo was to preserve Louisiana culture and cuisine by teaching chefs, students and community members to master the art of Cajun and Creole cooking. Emphasis was to be placed on the influences of Cajun-Creole cuisine: Native American, Spanish, French, African, German, English and Italian.

CJFCI began offering courses for college credit in 1995. The institute accepted its inaugural academic class in January 1996, offering an associate of science degree. The Louisiana Board of Regents authorized Nicholls to offer a bachelor's degree in culinary arts in 1997, making it the first four-year culinary degree program at a U.S. public university. Today, CJFCI has an enrollment of approximately 200 students and serves as one of the university's "areas of excellence."
