= List of assets owned by Recipe Unlimited =

The following is a list of assets owned by Recipe Unlimited Corporation:

== Restaurants ==
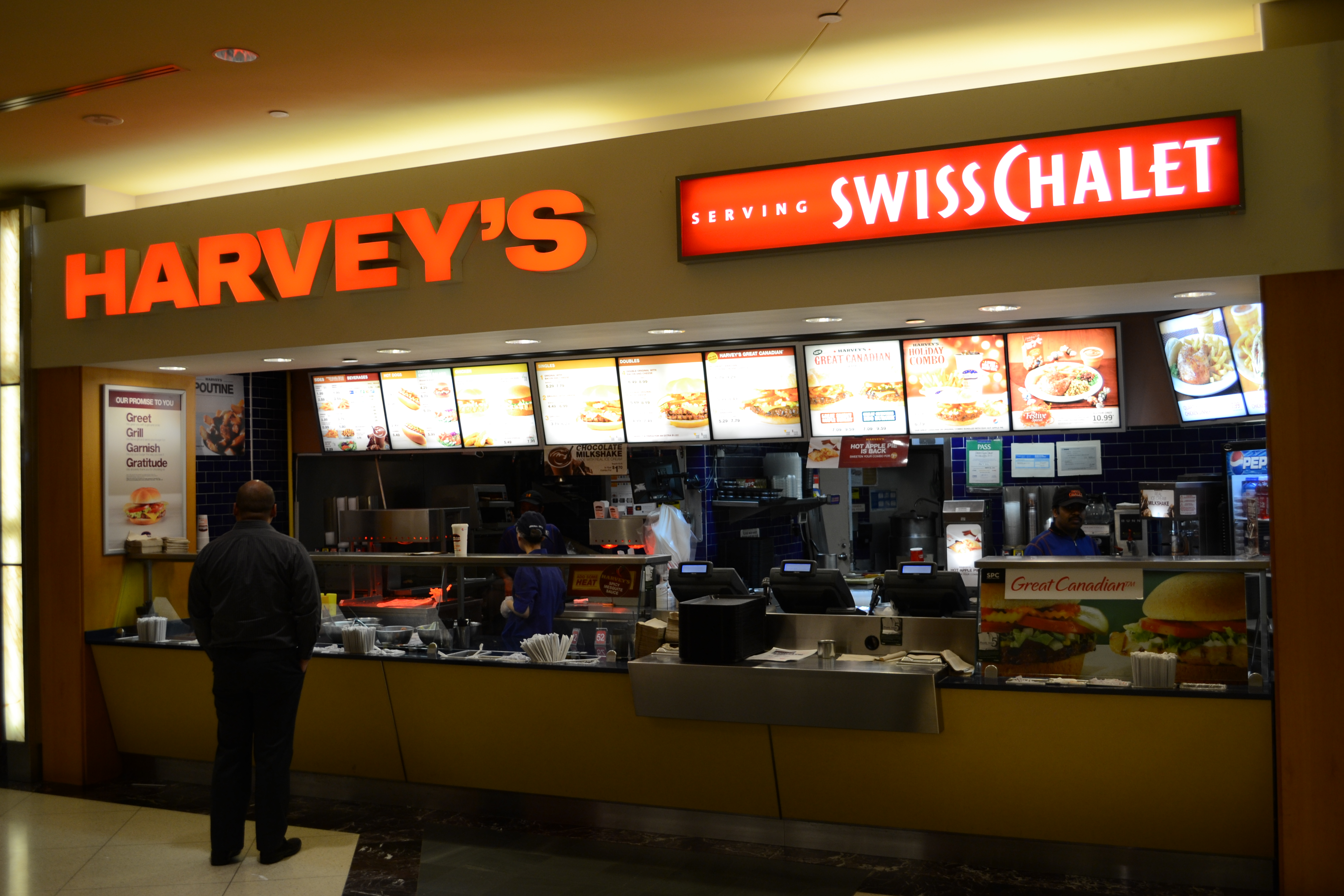
Harvey's combined with a Swiss Chalet

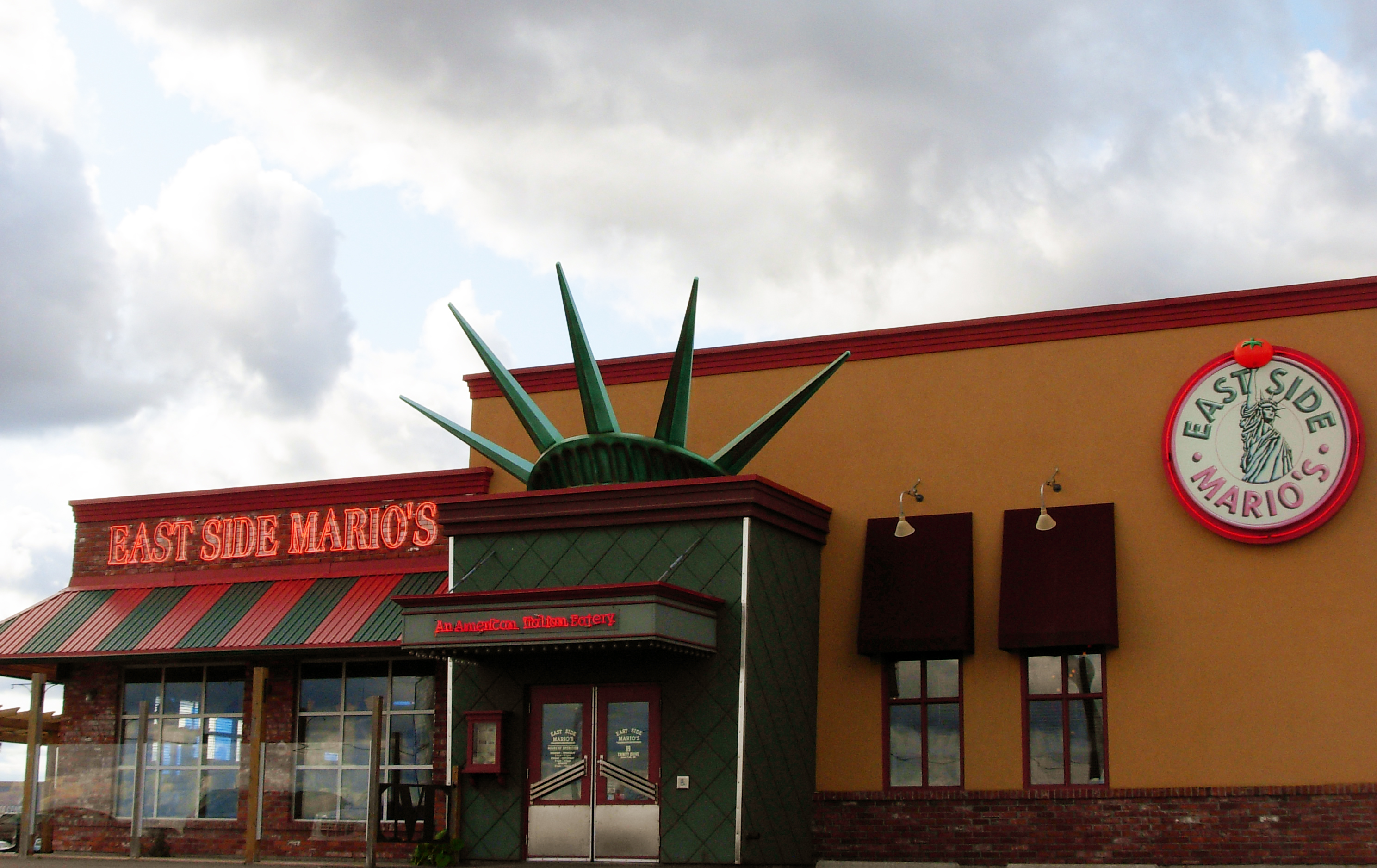
An East Side Mario's location in Moncton, New Brunswick

- Fresh Restaurants
- Bier Markt
- Burger's Priest
- East Side Mario's
- Elephant & Castle
- Harvey's
- The Keg
- Kelseys Original Roadhouse
- Landing Restaurant Group
- Montana's BBQ & Bar
- New York Fries
- Original Joe's
- The Pickle Barrel
- State & Main
- Swiss Chalet
- St-Hubert

== Former businesses ==
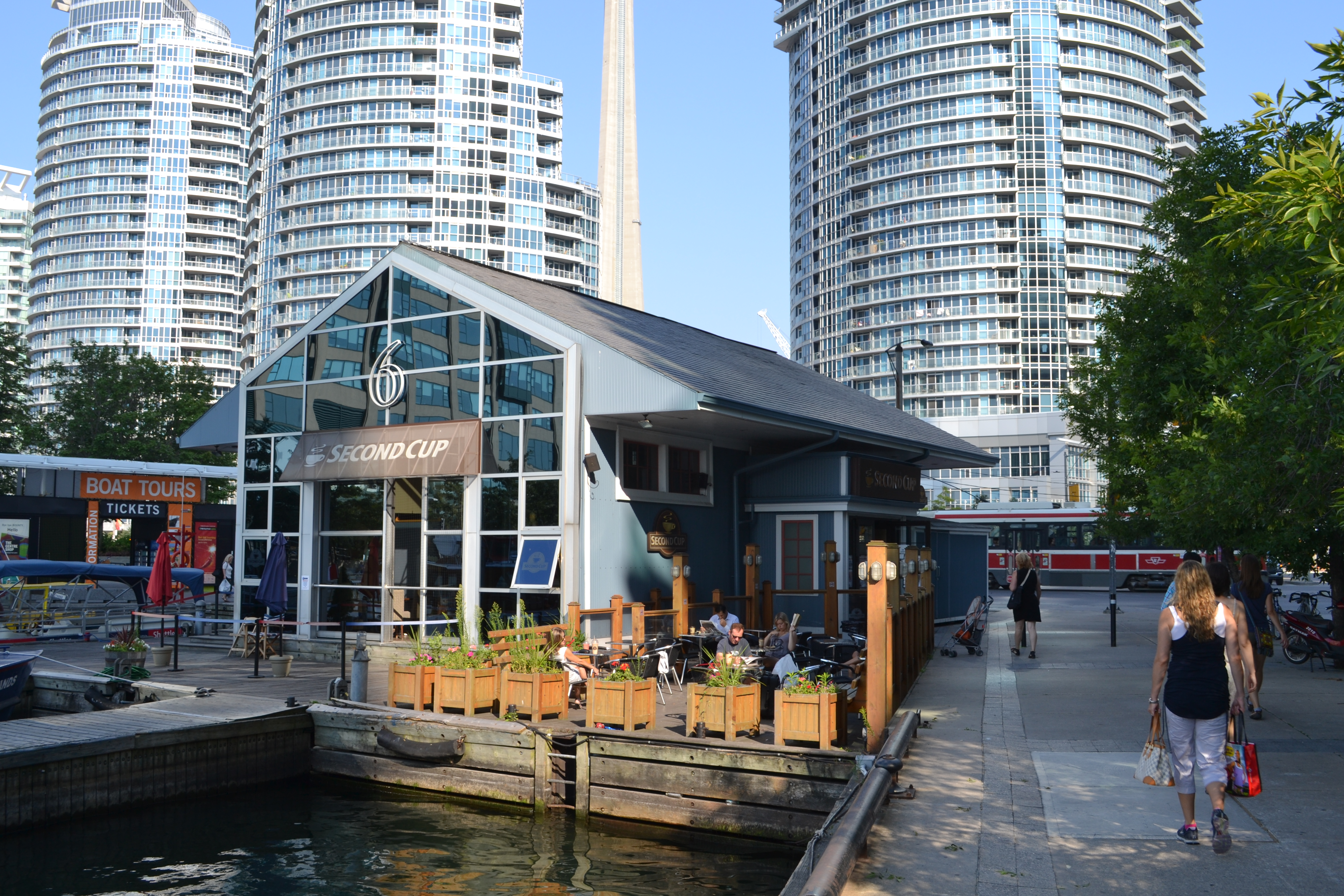
Pier Six Second Cup at Queens Quay

- Summit Food Service Distributors Inc. (sold to an investment group and no longer part of Cara as of January 8, 2007)
- Second Cup (sold to Dinecorp Hospitality on November 16, 2006)
- Cara Airport Services Division (sold to Gate Gourmet in 2010)
- Milestones Restaurants Inc. (sold to Foodtastic in 2021)
- Prime Pubs (sold to Foodtastic in 2022)

== See also ==
- Lists of corporate assets
