= Edo Japan (restaurant) =

Canadian Japanese Teppanyaki restaurant chain

- Type: Private
- Industry: Fast Food
- Founded: 1979; 47 years ago in Calgary, Alberta
- Founder: Reverend Susumu Ikuta
- Headquarters: Calgary, Alberta, Canada
- Number of locations: Over 200 in Canada (2025)
- Key people: Dave Minnett (President & CEO)
- Website: www.edojapan.com

Edo Japan, often known simply as Edo (/ˈiːdoʊ/), is a Canadian-founded fast food restaurant chain specializing in Japanese Teppan-style cooking. Founded in 1979 in Calgary, Alberta Canada by Reverend Susumu Ikuta, a Japanese Buddhist minister, Edo Japan was named after the original name of Tokyo. The company is based in Calgary, Alberta, and the first restaurant opened in 1979 in Calgary.

== History ==
Born in 1926 in Kyoto, Japan, Rev. Susumu Ikuta first moved to Australia with his family in 1937. After finishing high school, Rev. Ikuta moved back and forth between Australia and Japan until 1958, when he graduated with an M.A. in Buddhist Studies from Ryukoku University and moved to Canada for the last time to become a Jōdo Shinshū Buddhist minister for the Buddhist Churches of Canada.

In 1979, Rev. Ikuta opened the first Edo Japan restaurant as a means of establishing and sustaining the Calgary Buddhist Temple of Calgary, Alberta, and began franchising the business in 1986. In 1998, Reverend Ikuta became the first Australian-raised Bishop of the Buddhist Churches of Canada and decided it was time for someone else to manage Edo Japan's business.

== Expansion and growth ==
Over the course of Reverend Ikuta's leadership, the company grew to 102 food court locations in suburban shopping centres across Canada, the United States and Australia, with about $10 million in annual sales. In 1999, the former president of Moxie's, Tom Donaldson, took over as President and CEO of Edo Japan with a small equity earn-in position before purchasing the company outright in 2006. Over the next 10 years, Donaldson focused on revitalizing the brand by scaling back the number of locations to operate solely in Canada, which saw the company grow to $60 million in annual sales by 2011. Under Donaldson's leadership, the company expanded beyond mall food courts by opening its first stand-alone location in 2002, and by 2011 a further 36 street-front locations were established under. By 2015, the chain had 109 locations across British Columbia, Alberta, Saskatchewan, Ontario, and Quebec, with $92 million in annual sales.

In 2016, David Minnett, former president of Kelsey's (2006–2009) and Swiss Chalet and Harvey's (2009–2013), took over the role of President and CEO and has continued to expand the company into Ontario and Manitoba, with more than 140 restaurants across Canada as of 2020. Minnett's leadership also brought new additions to the menu and the "Edo Fresh Take" restaurant redesign, which modernized the restaurant's décor and layout, and introduced a grab and go market wall with imported Japanese snacks for purchase.

== Menu ==
Edo Japan's core menu items are made to order using a signature teriyaki sauce and cooked on a 450 °F (232 °C) teppan grill. The menu also includes Japanese dishes such as sushi, udon soups and bento boxes.
