= Recipe Unlimited =

Restaurant chain operator in Canada

Coordinates: 43.690824°N 79.623928°W

Recipe Unlimited Corporation
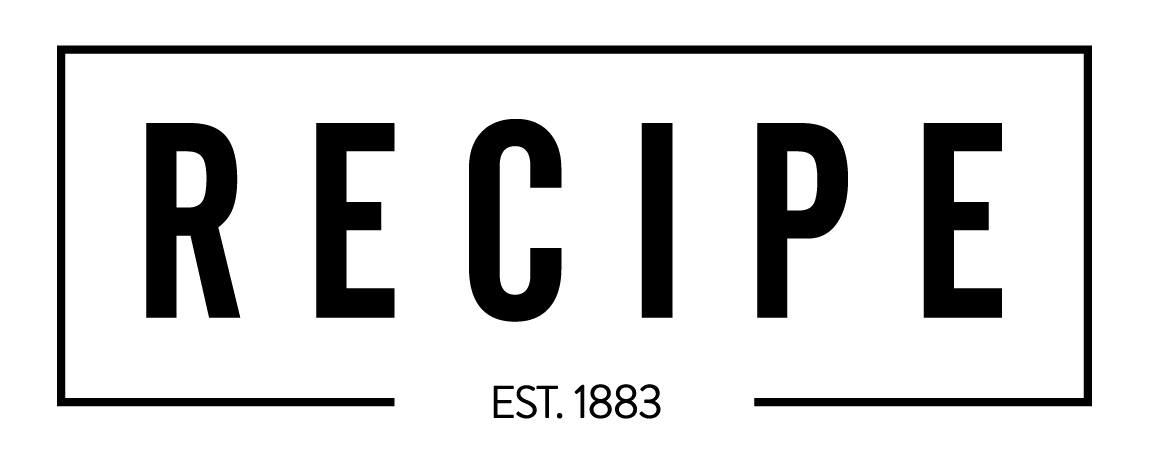
- Formerly: Canada Railway News Company (1883–1961); Aero Caterers Limited (1941–1961); Cara Operations Limited (1961–2018)
- Type: Private
- Industry: Branded restaurants
- Founded: 1883; 143 years ago (CRNP); 1941; 85 years ago (Aero Caterers); 1961; 65 years ago (present day company)
- Founder: Thomas Patrick Phelan and family
- Headquarters: Concord, Vaughan, Ontario, Canada
- Number of locations: 1,355
- Key people: Frank Hennessey (CEO)
- Brands: The Burger's Priest; East Side Mario's; Harvey's; Kelseys Original Roadhouse; Montana's; New York Fries; The Pickle Barrel; St-Hubert; Swiss Chalet
- Revenue: ▲ C$1,252 million (2019)
- Net income: ▲ C$44 million (2019)
- Total assets: ▲ C$2,264 million (2019)
- Total equity: ▲ C$345 million (2019)
- Number of employees: 40,000
- Parent: Fairfax Financial
- Subsidiaries: Franworks Group
- Website: www.recipeunlimited.com

Recipe Unlimited Corporation is a Canadian company that operates several restaurant chains, such as Swiss Chalet and Harvey's, and food distribution for large operations.

The company was originated in 1883 as Canada Railway News Company that sold newspapers, magazines and confectioneries before moving to the restaurant business. The present company dates to 1961, as Canada Railway News Co. merged with Aero Caterers Limited, founded in 1941 as an airline catering service, to form Cara Operations Limited and the company went public in 1968. The company adopted its present name in May 2018 and its headquarters are in Vaughan, Ontario, a suburb north of Toronto within the Greater Toronto Area.

== History ==
The company was originally chartered in 1883 as Canada Railway News Company, selling newspapers, magazines and confectionaries at railway stations. The company's roots go back to the mid-1850s, when Thomas Patrick Phelan was selling apples and newspapers to train passengers on the Niagara Steamboats. Canada Railway News soon moved into the food business, catering to a boom in passenger rail traffic in Canada. Then, in the 1930s, the company began offering catering services to the airlines and by 1941, Aero Caterers Limited was launched. By 1951, it was serving about 1,500 meals a day.

In 1961, the company merged Canada Railway News Company and Aero Caterers and changed its name to Cara Operations Limited. The name Cara was derived from the first two letters of each of the words "Canada Railway".

Cara was owned solely by the Phelan family from its inception in 1883 until it went public in 1968. At that time, its primary business was catering to the transportation sector (airline and rail meals), but it did operate restaurants and coffee shops in various office towers and airport terminals in Canada. Total sales of all the various operations was Can$30 million in 1968.

Cara’s most successful acquisition came in the form of Swiss Chalet and Harvey’s in 1977 when they attained full ownership from FoodCorp Limited. After 1977, Cara’s next acquisition was not until 1990, when they purchased Grand & Toy to expand their company. The next year, Cara bought Beaver Foods and Summit Food Service Distributors, a catering company for hospitals, offices and educational institutions and a distribution company respectively. However in 1996, Cara sold Grand & Toy to maintain a commitment to the food service industry and acquired a 37% share in The Second Cup Ltd. Two years later, in 1998, Cara became the largest shareholder of The Spectra Group of Great Restaurants Inc., owners of Milestones Grill and Bar. In 1999, Cara became the majority owner of three chain restaurants: Kelsey’s Neighbourhood Bar & Grill, Montana’s Cookhouse and acquired the license to the Outback Steakhouse after acquiring a 61% ownership from Kelsey's International Inc. While obtaining multiple restaurant chains, Cara sold its interest in Beaver Foods and Summit Food Service Distributors to Compass Group to maintain an organization focused on being restaurant owners in 2001. In 2002, Cara made three large transactions. First, the organization completely bought the entire Second Cup organization, then exchanged its shares of Spectra Group of Great Restaurants for control over the Milestones Bar and Grill chain, and obtained 100% ownership of Kelsey’s International Inc. The rights to Outback steakhouse were owned in Canada by Cara, but it was sold back to Outback corporation in the United States because of high food costs. In the same year, sales for the company were Can$1.9 billion. 88% of the business comes from the restaurant services, with the remaining 12% deriving from airline catering.

On February 26, 2004, Cara went private, with the Phelan heiresses buying out the minority for $8 a share or $345 million, after a short battle in which they had offered $7.625 a share for the 46.5% of the company they didn't own. At the time, Cara fully owned Swiss Chalet, Harvey's, Second Cup, Kelsey's Neighborhood Bar & Grill, and Montana's. It owned as a franchisee Eastern Canadian Outback Steakhouse restaurants.

In 2010, Cara Operations exited the airline catering business with the sale of Cara Airline Solutions.

In 2013, Cara came to an agreement with Fairfax Financial Holdings Ltd. to make Prime Restaurants, which was previously bought by Fairfax, a wholly owned subsidiary of Cara. This transaction allowed Cara full control of East Side Mario’s, Casey’s, Bier Markt, Prime Pubs (Fionn MacCool’s and The Merchant). As a result of the deal, Fairfax became the majority stakeholders and Bill Gregson became the new president and CEO of Cara.

In 2014, it acquired the majority ownership of Landing Restaurants including Hunter’s Landing, Harper’s Landing, and Williams Landing. Cara had EBITDA of $84 million on sales of $1.7 billion in 2014, but had a 6.4 debt leverage ratio when Bill Gregson assumed the presidency of the firm, because the funds obtained via the sale of non-core-asset had been used, not to pay down debt but instead to expand the business.

In March 2015, the Cara IPO at the Toronto Stock Exchange was brokered by Fairfax Financial. Shares of Cara Operations reached as high as $33 after the IPO was set at $200 million with shares to be sold at $19 to $22. As a result of returning to the Toronto Stock Exchange, Fairfax and the Phelan family had control over Cara Operations, 41% and 36% respectively, with the possession of the company's multiple voting shares at 25 votes per share. Through the stock listing, it merged in a 7:8 ratio with Fairfax's East Side Mario's, Casey's and the Bier Markt properties. The $200 million represented a 23% stake in the combined business, and the heiresses had in 2015 realised a valuation of roughly $300 million. The services of Bill Gregson were acquired in the deal by the merged company. In August 2015, Cara obtained full ownership of New York Fries to expand its already extensive line of restaurant chains in Canada. South St. Burger would not be part of the acquisition.

On March 31, 2016, Cara Operations announced that it would acquire St-Hubert Chicken $537 million. On September 1, 2016, Cara Operations acquired Franworks Group, and its Original Joe's, State & Main, and Elephant & Castle brands.

In 2017, Cara acquired The Pickle Barrel.

In January 2018, Cara Operations acquired The Keg for $200 million. In May 2018, then Chief Executive Officer Bill Gregson announced that Cara Operations Limited would be changing its name to Recipe Unlimited Corporation and would be traded under the new stock symbol "RECP".

On October 1, 2018, the company was hit by a malware attack, requiring closure of many of its restaurants in Canada. The attack required some restaurants to continue as cash-only operations until at least the following day. Some locations were without point-of-sale systems and also without electronic payment methods for almost a week.

In 2021, Recipe Unlimited acquired the controlling interest of Burger's Priest.

On August 9, 2022, Fairfax Financial proposed to take the company private for $954 million. Upon completion of the deal on October 31, 2022, Recipe Unlimited's stock was delisted from the Toronto Stock Exchange.

In July 2025, Recipe Unlimited acquired the eight Canadian locations of Olive Garden, with plans to expand the brand in Canada.

== Labour issues ==
Beginning October 5, 2015, female employees at all Bier Markt locations were required to wear tight blue mini-dresses, and heels or boots as footwear on the job. The work outfit practice applied to employees at locations in Ontario and Quebec who had previously worn black pants and golf shirt as a uniform. After the CBC investigated complaints of gender discrimination, Cara modified its outfit practice to allow employees to wear the original gender-neutral uniform.

In early 2018, Cara's CEO and President Bill Gregson announced that the recent Ontario minimum wage hike to $14 an hour had not adversely affected revenues, with sales going up throughout most of Ontario.

== Operations ==
=== Restaurants ===
As of 2021, Recipe Unlimited has over 1,300 restaurants within Canada.

==== Restaurant operations ====
- Swiss Chalet
- Kelseys Original Roadhouse
- Montana's
- East Side Mario's
- Bier Markt
- The Burger's Priest
- Landing Group
- Harvey's
- New York Fries
- St-Hubert
- The Pickle Barrel
- Original Joe's
- State & Main
- Elephant & Castle
- Taverne Moderne
- Fresh Restaurants
- Olive Garden Canada

==== Former restaurants ====
- Gatineau Brew Works
- Pizza Grillia
- Steak n'Burger
- Toast! Cafe & Grill
- The Keg
- Milestones Grill and Bar
- Prime Restaurants
- Prime Pubs
- Fionn MacCool's
- Coza Tuscan Grill
- Casey's Grill & Bar

=== Correctional facilities and prisons ===
Under their subsidiary Summit Food Services, Cara provided commissary and kitchen services to correctional facilities internationally. Sold by Cara to an investor group in 2007, Summit Food Service Distributors Inc., now a division of Colabor LP, is Canada's largest Canadian-owned broadline distributor to the food service industry.

=== Airline catering ===
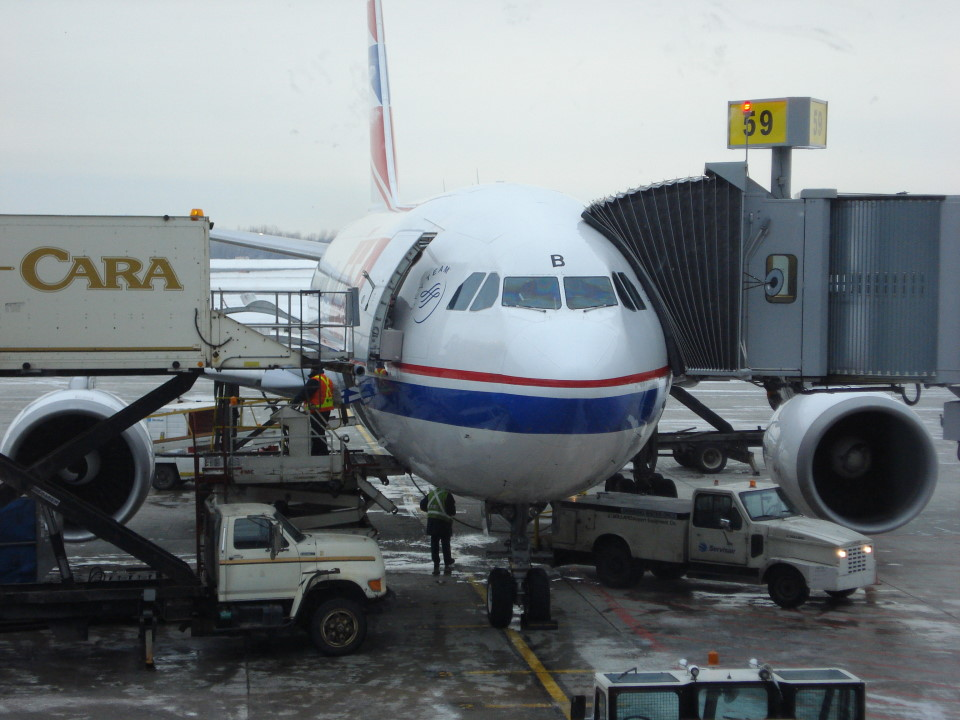
Cara servicing a Czech Airlines flight in Montreal in February 2008.

Cara Airline Solutions business assets were sold on November 8, 2010, to Gate Gourmet (Gategroup). Before November 8, 2010, Cara controlled 85% of the Canadian airline market, providing meals for more than 60 of the world's major airlines including KLM, American Airlines, British Airways and Air Canada.

== See also ==
- List of Canadian restaurant chains
- List of assets owned by Recipe Unlimited
