= State & Main =

State & Main may refer to:

- State & Main, a Canadian restaurant chain owned by Franworks Group
- State and Main, a 2000 film
