= Montana's =

Canadian steakhouse restaurant chain

Montana's BBQ & Bar

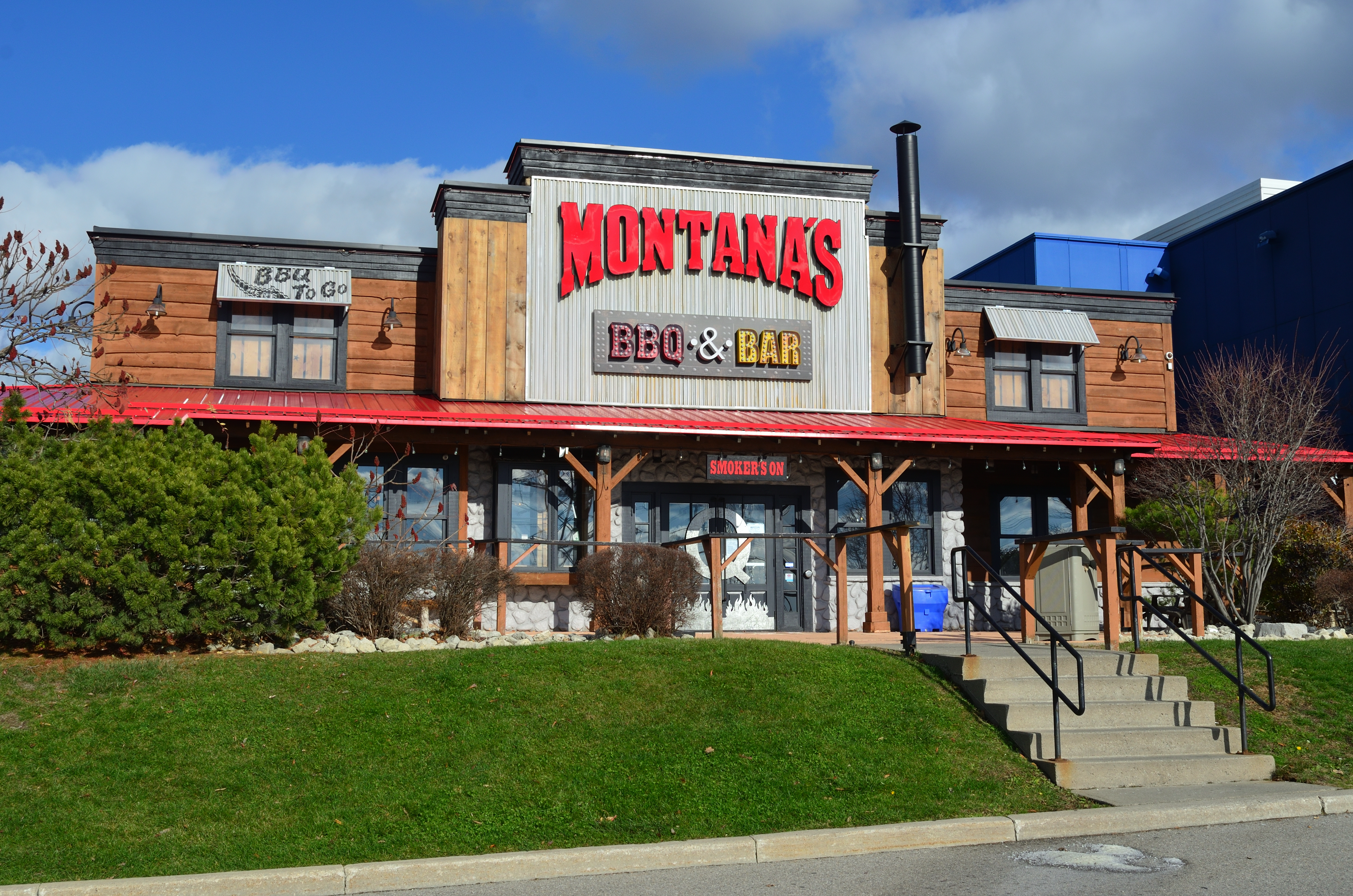
- Company type: Subsidiary
- Industry: Restaurant
- Founded: 1995; 31 years ago
- Founder: Paul Jeffery
- Headquarters: 199 Four Valley Drive Vaughan, Ontario
- Number of locations: 95
- Area served: Canada
- Parent: Recipe Unlimited
- Website: montanas.ca

Montana's BBQ & Bar (originally and in some cases, still branded as Montana's Cookhouse Saloon) is a Canadian restaurant chain known for smoked pork ribs, steaks, and burgers. It is headquartered in Vaughan, Ontario and is a subsidiary of Recipe Unlimited.

== Operations ==
Montana's BBQ & Bar has 94 restaurants located across Canada, down from 105 in 2010. They have an established presence in all the Canadian provinces except Quebec, and none in the three territories. As of February 2009, Montana's closed their United States locations in Michigan and New York.

== History ==
Montana's Cookhouse first opened its doors in 1995 as a subsidiary of Kelseys Original Roadhouse. The original idea was thought up by Kelsey's owner Paul Jeffery and its president Nils Kravis. In 1999, Cara Operations (now known as Recipe Unlimited) obtained controlling interest in Kelsey's, including the Montana's chain. Cara completed its acquisition of the entire company in 2002.

As of 2015, the chain began rebranding as Montana's BBQ & Bar.

== Brier sponsorship ==
In 2024, Montana's became the title sponsor of The Brier, the Canadian men's curling championship. Montana's replaced Tim Hortons, which had sponsored the Brier beginning in 2005.

== Loyalty program ==
Montana's began a partnership with Scene+ in February 2015 (then known as Scene).

== See also ==
- List of Canadian restaurant chains
- List of assets owned by Recipe Unlimited
