= New York Fries =

Canadian fast-food restaurant chain

- Type: Subsidiary
- Industry: Quick-service restaurant
- Founded: August 16, 1984; 42 years ago
- Headquarters: Vaughan, Ontario, Canada
- Area served: Canada, USA, United Arab Emirates, India, Saudi Arabia
- Key people: Jay Gould; Chris O'Leary
- Products: French Fries, Poutine, Hot Dogs
- Parent: Recipe Unlimited (2015–present)
- Website: www.newyorkfries.com

New York Fries (NYF) is a Canadian fast food restaurant chain that specializes in french fries, hot dogs and poutine. Despite its name and original NYC roots, the brand is Canadian.

== History ==
In 1983, Jay Gould was informed by his brother Hal of a small French fry stand at South Street Seaport called "New York Fries." Impressed with the quality of the business and the product, Jay approached the owner and eventually bought the Canadian rights to the business and namesake.

The first Canadian location opened on August 16, 1984, at Scarborough Town Centre. It initially only sold fries and cola.

In 1987, with the original American company now out of business, Gould purchased the franchise outright, making New York Fries a Canadian brand.

The brand introduced poutine onto its menu in 1989.

Cara Operations (now known as Recipe Unlimited) bought New York Fries in September 2015.

In 2024, decades after the American stand had closed, New York Fries opened its "first" US location in Uniondale, New York.

=== South St. Burger Co. ===
Since the sale of New York Fries, South St. Burger Company is no longer run by New York Fries. South St Burger Co. has 30 locations across Canada and two in Dubai. South St. Burger Co. sells hamburgers, fries and poutine.

== Locations ==
New York Fries has 156 locations, including 120 in Canada, 3 in the United States, and 36 outside of North America, mostly in the Middle East and China.

== See also ==
- List of Canadian restaurant chains
- List of assets owned by Recipe Unlimited
