= Jack Dunham =

American animator and television producer

Jack Dunham (September 19, 1910 – August 16, 2008) was an American animator and television producer who worked for Walt Disney Animation Studios and Walter Lantz Productions during his career.

Dunham was born in Bismarck, North Dakota, on September 19, 1910.

He began his career by working on animated shorts of Oswald the Lucky Rabbit for Walt Disney in 1932 and later with Walter Lantz at Walter Lantz Productions. Dunham also worked as an animator on several other Walter Lantz Production cartoons, including Night Life of the Bugs and The Fun House, which were both released in 1936, and Dumb Cluck and Duck Hunt, which were both produced in 1937. He also worked on an episode of Meany, Miny and Moe and The Country Store, which was released in 1937.

Dunham was hired by the Walt Disney Animation Studios in 1932 (before the Social Security Administration and public records existed), where he worked as an inbetweener, an industry term for an animator's assistant, on the film Snow White And the Seven Dwarfs. Dunham also worked on such films as Fantasia and Dumbo among others and later joined management. During this time he handled productions in Mexico for Saludos Amigos and The Three Caballeros. He remained a producer/unit manager until his departure from Disney in 1947.

Dunham moved to Canada in 1955 for a management position at Associated Screen News of Canada in Montreal. He later enjoyed a career creating both animated and live action commercials in Toronto and Montreal.

Dunham created the official mascot of the St-Hubert BBQ restaurant chain, the St. Hubert rooster. St-Hubert is a chain of rotisserie chicken based in Quebec. Dunham also produced St-Hubert's first television commercials. The St. Hubert rooster is still used as the mascot and logo for the St-Hubert chain as of 2009.

An article in the Montreal Gazette in March 2006 revealed that Dunham and his wife, Dorothy Stewart, a former fashion model, were homeless following their eviction from their Montreal apartment in February 2006. The Gazette reported, "Social service agencies are trying to place the couple in a care facility, but that could take awhile." Dunham and his wife, who had been married for 51 years at the time, were taken to the St. Luc Hospital to live following the publication of the article. Their move to the government-run hospital was reportedly against the couple's will. Jack and Dorothy escaped from the facility, but were found by police in Ottawa and returned.

Jack Dunham died on August 16, 2008, at the age of 97. Erroneous reports list his death as on March 15, 2009, as Quebec's Public Curator did not notify Dunham's friend and only listed contact of his death until that date.
