= St-Hubert (restaurant) =

Canadian restaurant chain

St-Hubert BBQ Ltd.
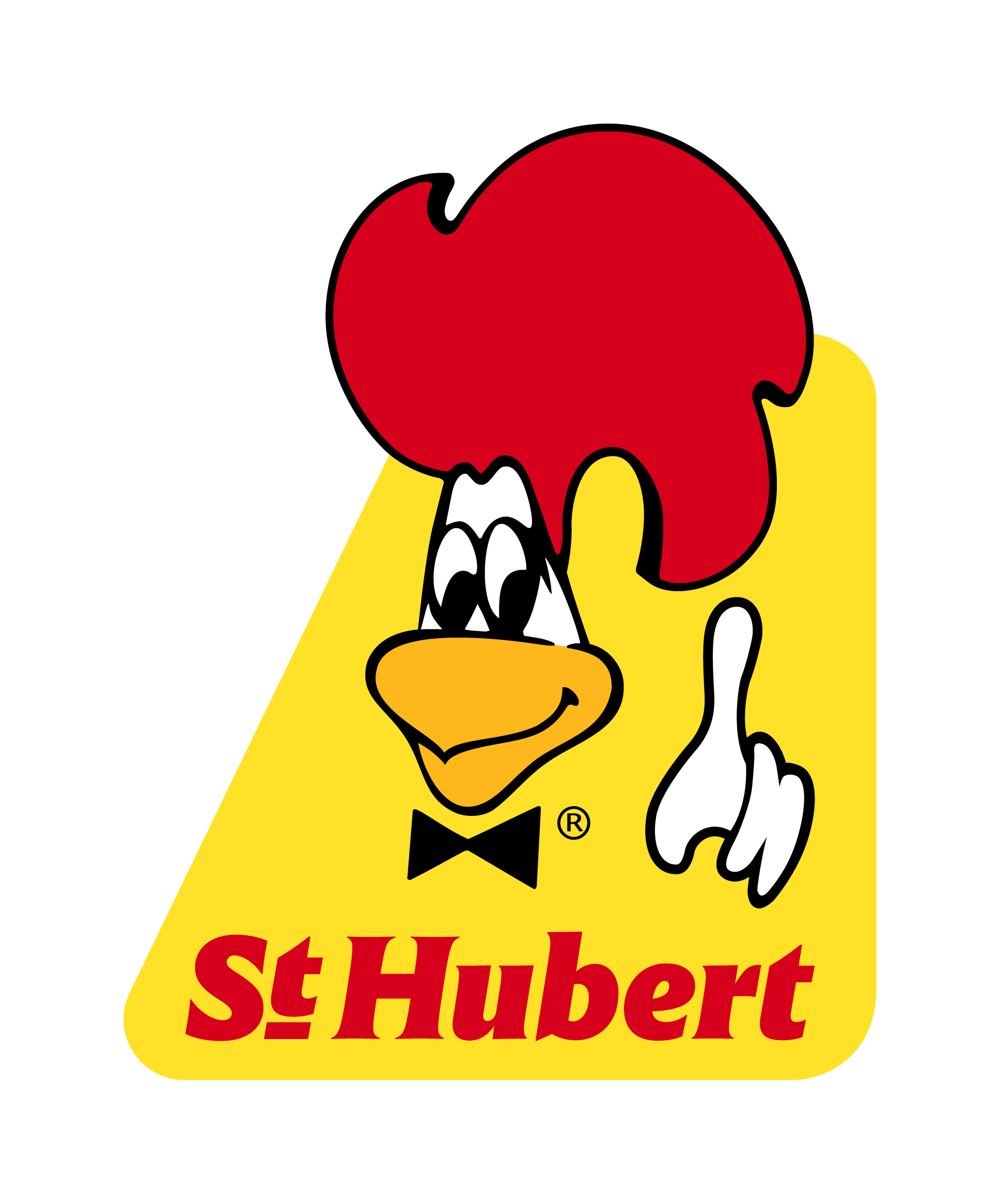
- Type: Subsidiary
- Industry: Casual dining restaurants
- Founded: 1951; 75 years ago in Montreal, Quebec, Canada
- Founders: Hélène Léger; René Léger
- Headquarters: Boisbriand, Quebec, Canada
- Area served: Quebec, Ontario, New Brunswick
- Products: Rotisserie chicken, salads, ribs
- Parent: Recipe Unlimited (2016–present)
- Website: st-hubert.com

St-Hubert BBQ Ltd. is a Canadian chain of casual dining restaurants best known for its rotisserie chicken. St-Hubert is most popular in Quebec and in other French-Canadian areas such as Eastern Ontario and New Brunswick. The chain enjoys the second-highest customer loyalty of any restaurant in Canada (after Tim Hortons), according to industry analysis.

In March 2016, St-Hubert agreed to be purchased by Toronto-area based Cara Operations (now known as Recipe Unlimited), the owner of the rival Swiss Chalet rotisserie chicken chain, for $537 million. Cara increased its restaurant presence in Quebec as the St-Hubert chicken deal closed in September 2016.

== History ==
The first restaurant opened in September 1951 on Saint Hubert Street in Montreal, just south of Beaubien street. This branch still operates today, but has been converted to a St-Hubert Express take-out restaurant. The founding family of Hélène and René Léger copied similar barbecue restaurants in the city.

St-Hubert began selling its gravy in supermarkets across Quebec in 1965. The company also sells its barbecue sauce in the ready-to-serve format, desserts, seasonings, and frozen chicken in supermarkets.

The original St-Hubert Chicken mascot was created and designed by former Disney animator Jack Dunham. Dunham also produced St-Hubert's first television commercials. However, the current St-Hubert mascot, which has been in use since the early 1970s, was not created by Dunham.

Operating under the U.S.-based company St. Hubert of Florida, Inc., a St-Hubert restaurant opened on June 12, 1979, at 1431 N. Federal Highway in Fort Lauderdale, Florida. The owners hoped to eventually open more chain restaurants in the States, but only if the first proved successful. The Fort Lauderdale restaurant, which principally served snowbird Canadians who spent their vacations in southern Florida, was known for its ability to serve its customers in French, as 80% of its clients were French Canadians, and motivated the employers of their own accord to seek French-speaking employees. The ads the restaurant ran on television and in newspapers also carried French. The location was still open in as late as 1987, but by mid-1988, a Shoney's restaurant had opened in its place.

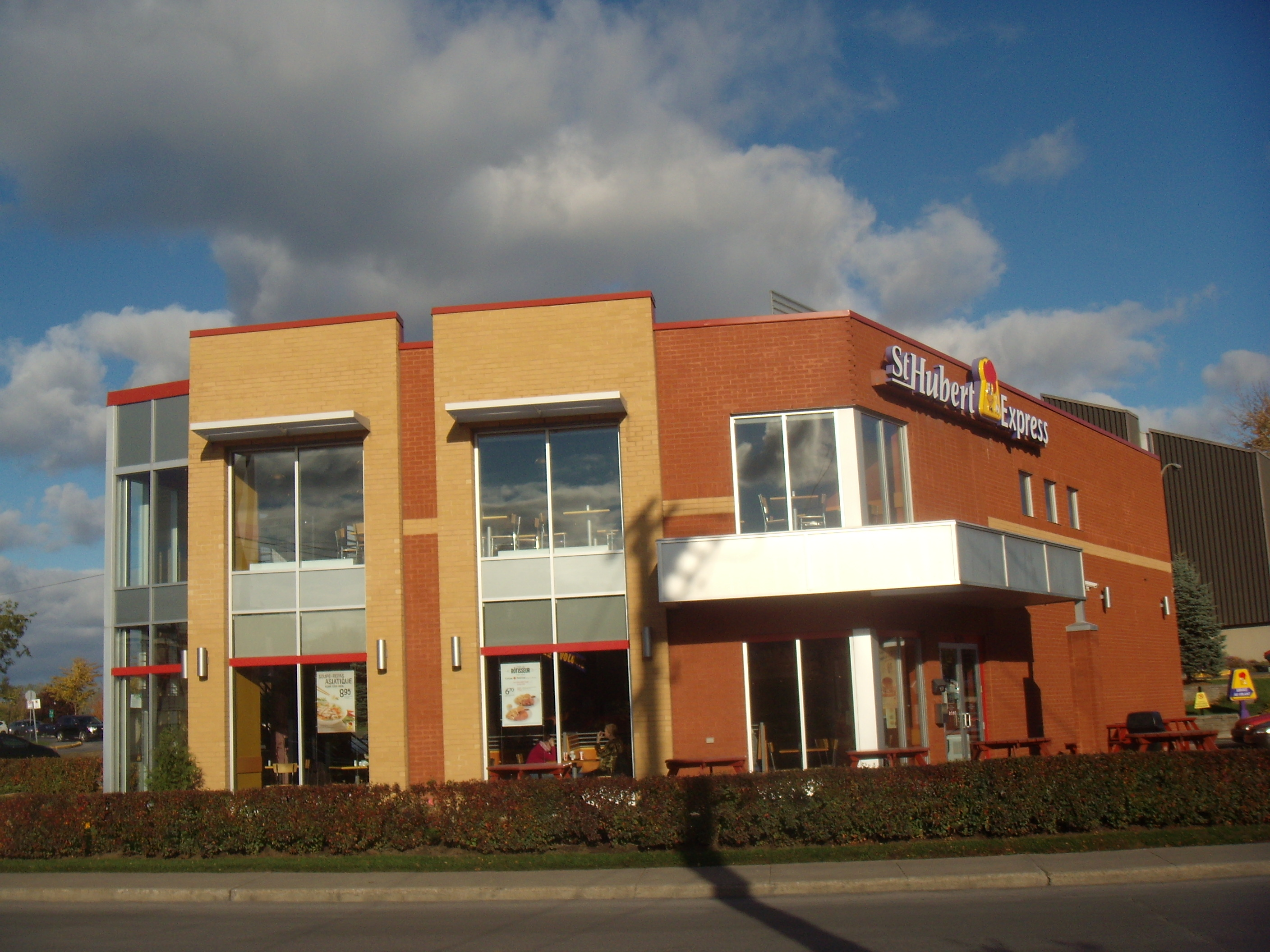
A St-Hubert Express restaurant

In 1983, St-Hubert attempted another type of expansion, this time in Italian cuisine. St-Hubert inaugurated the Pastelli restaurant and announced that it wanted to open 30 to 40 other franchises across Quebec during the following five years. The results were conclusive and other franchises were opened, but St-Hubert decided to end the experiment in the late 1980s.

In 2005, St-Hubert voluntarily became the first restaurant chain in Quebec to ban smoking inside its restaurants. This was one year before the province of Quebec made it mandatory.

St-Hubert's president was quoted in a Postmedia News article in October 2011 as saying that the company was considering adding halal and kosher products. It has since recanted in the aftermath of Quebec's reasonable accommodation debate.

On March 31, 2016, Ontario-based Cara Operations, owner of the Swiss Chalet chain of rotisserie chicken restaurants, announced that it would acquire St-Hubert in the summer of 2016 for CAD$537 million. Caisse de dépôt et placement du Québec (CDPQ), an investment management firm, had presented an offer to acquire a minority share in St-Hubert, but was subsequently declined. Léger sought buyers within Quebec, but did not encounter any companies he was comfortable selling to. The sale was completed on September 2, 2016.

In 2017, Montreal actor Jay Baruchel mentioned St-Hubert as his favorite restaurant to visit when visiting the city during an interview on Jimmy Kimmel Live!. St-Hubert spokesperson Josée Vaillancourt later reached out to Baruchel after the actor claimed that he was willing to also appear in a commercial for the restaurant.

== Operations ==
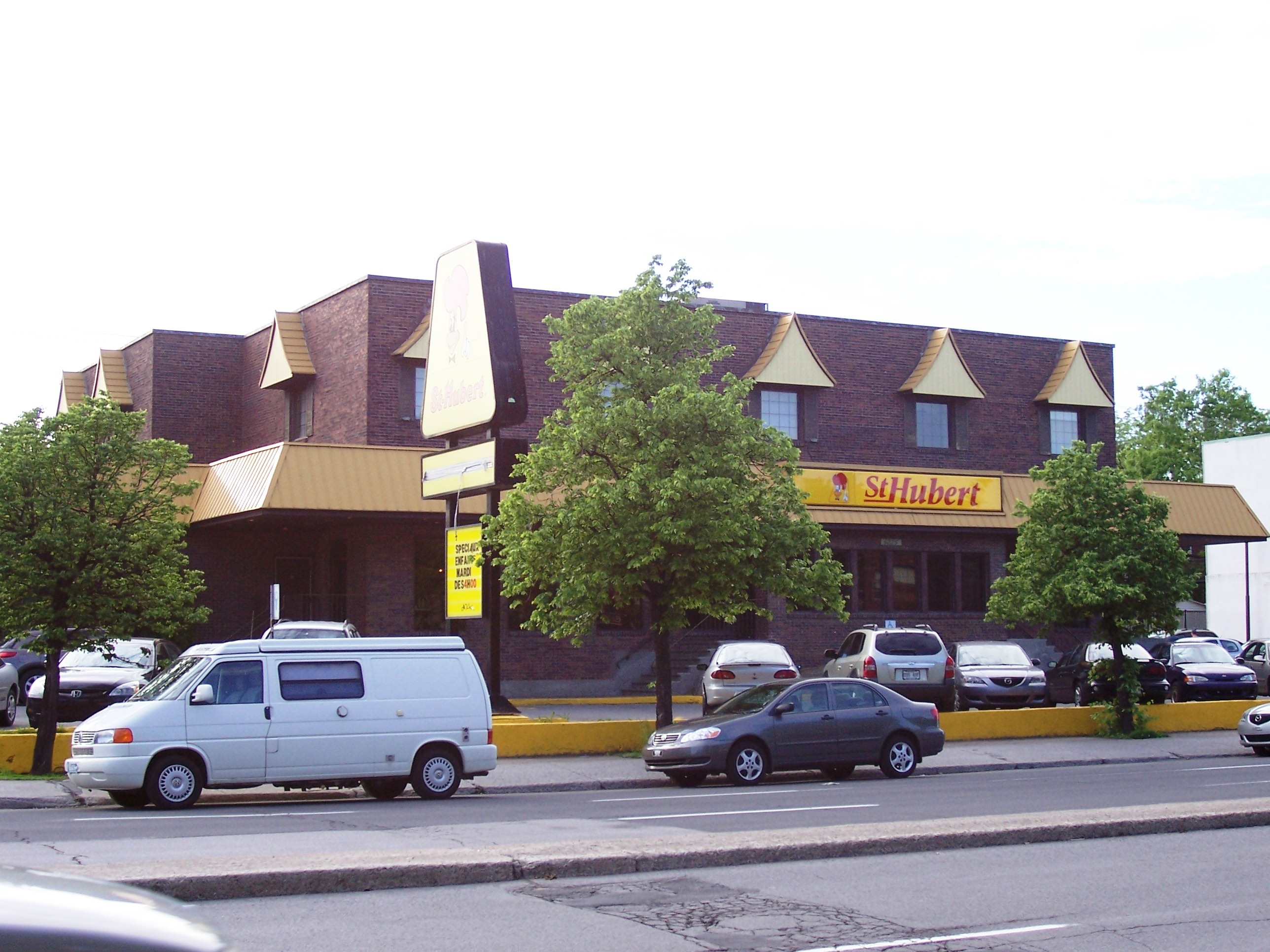
A St-Hubert restaurant in Montreal, Quebec, Canada

St-Hubert's service area has little overlap with the similar Swiss Chalet chain, which exited the Quebec market in the early 2000s, although there was no agreement between the chains. Following the closure or rebranding (as independent restaurants) of St-Hubert's remaining Toronto area locations over the following few years, the chains now only overlap in the Ottawa area, and in Moncton and Fredericton, New Brunswick. Restaurants in the Saint John, New Brunswick, area closed in 2013. Locations in Halifax Nova Scotia & St. John's, Newfoundland also existed, but were closed around the late 1980s, early 1990s. However, in a 2007 interview with La Presse, St-Hubert CEO Jean-Pierre Léger suggested that the company was considering re-entering other eastern Canadian markets.

In January 2011, St-Hubert announced that its expansion plans included the opening of three Toronto area locations of the St-Hubert Express concept. It was also considering entering markets outside Canada. At around the same time, the company briefly re-entered the Kingston marketplace with a St-Hubert Express, which closed about a year after opening.

The St-Hubert locations operate as full-service restaurants, resto-bars, and 'St-Hubert Express' locations (closer in style to fast food restaurants, also with take-out, drive-thru and delivery). The bright yellow cars delivering food have carried the slogan "Putt-Putt Ding-Ding".

== See also ==
- List of Canadian restaurant chains
- List of chicken restaurants
- List of assets owned by Recipe Unlimited
