= Angus burger =

Hamburger made using Angus beef

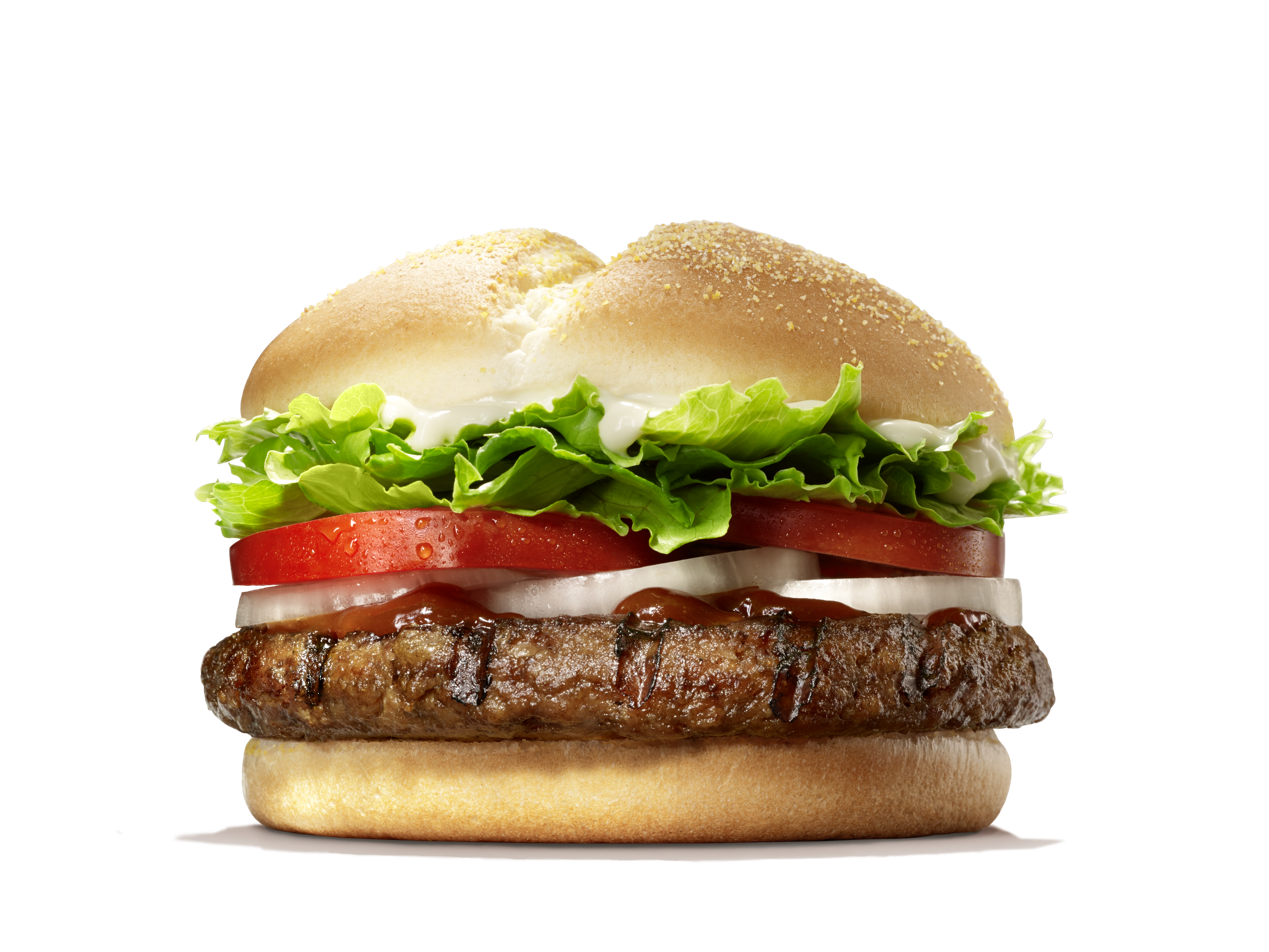
Vitamins and minerals
- ^{†}Percentages estimated using US recommendations for adults.

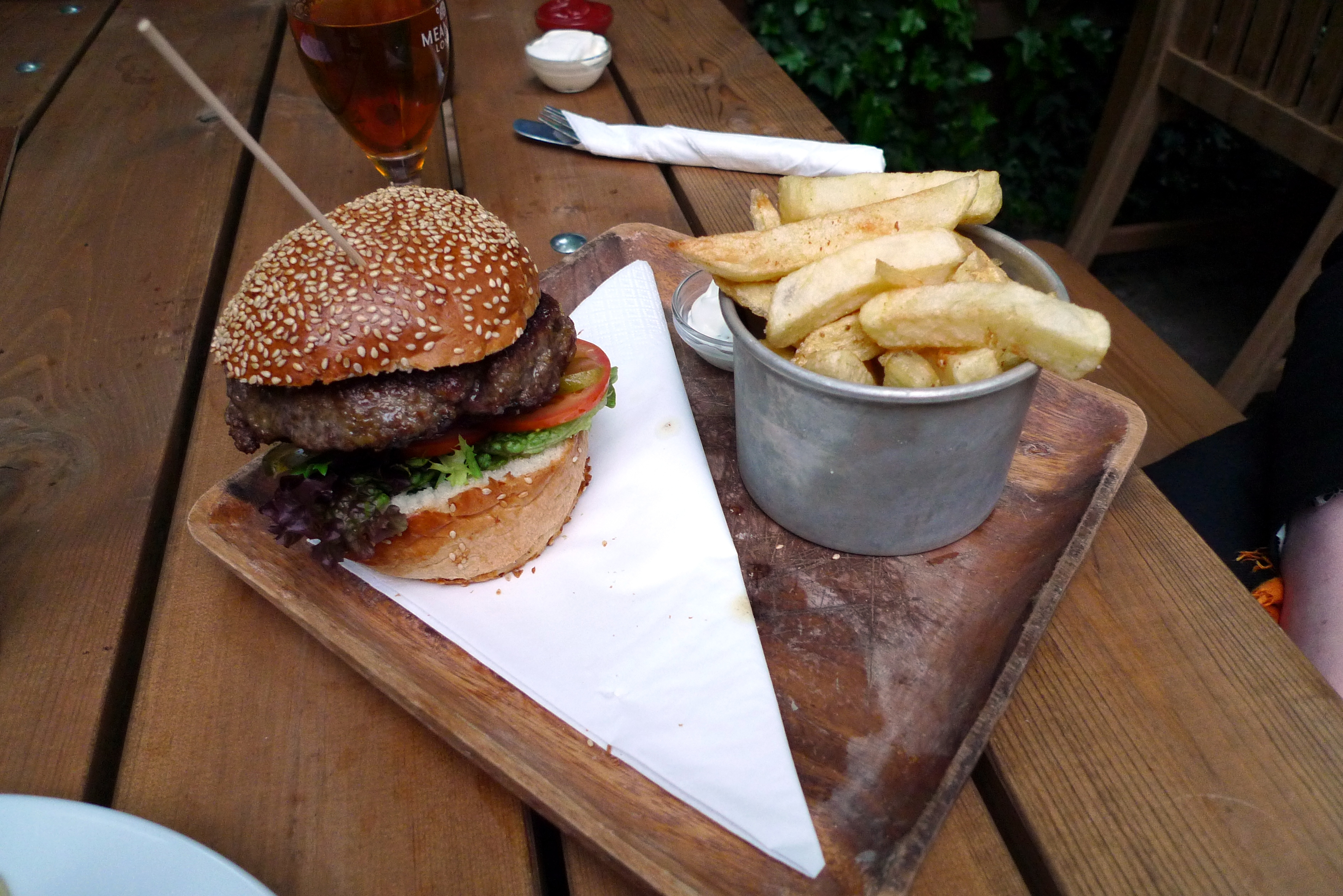
A 28-day aged Angus beef burger and fries at a restaurant

An Angus burger is a hamburger made using beef from Angus cattle. The name Angus burger is used by several fast-food hamburger chains for one or more "premium" burgers; however, it does not belong to any single company. Pre-made frozen Angus burgers are increasingly available from retailers.

== Restaurant Angus burgers ==
Since 2006, McDonald's has test-marketed its own version of the sandwich in several markets, including Chicago, Illinois and upstate New York. The test sandwich was offered in three varieties that had similar makeup of the standard Burger King version, the mushroom Swiss and the bacon cheese.

In Canada, the hamburger chain Harvey's sells an Angus burger on its menu, while McDonald's Canada introduced an Angus burger in May 2008.

In mid-2009, two varieties of the Angus burger were added to McDonald's Australia and New Zealand menus. The first is the "Grand Angus", which consists of Angus beef, mustard, McChicken-sauce mayonnaise, processed cheese, red onion, lettuce, and tomato. The second is the "Mighty Angus", which consists of Angus beef, processed cheese, McChicken sauce, onion relish, red onion and bacon. In December 2015, the Grand Angus was re-released as the Classic Angus and the Mighty Angus was re-released as the Aussie BBQ Angus.

In 2019, a Black version of Angus burger was released.

== See also ==
- List of hamburgers
