= East Side Mario's =

Canadian casual dining restaurant chain

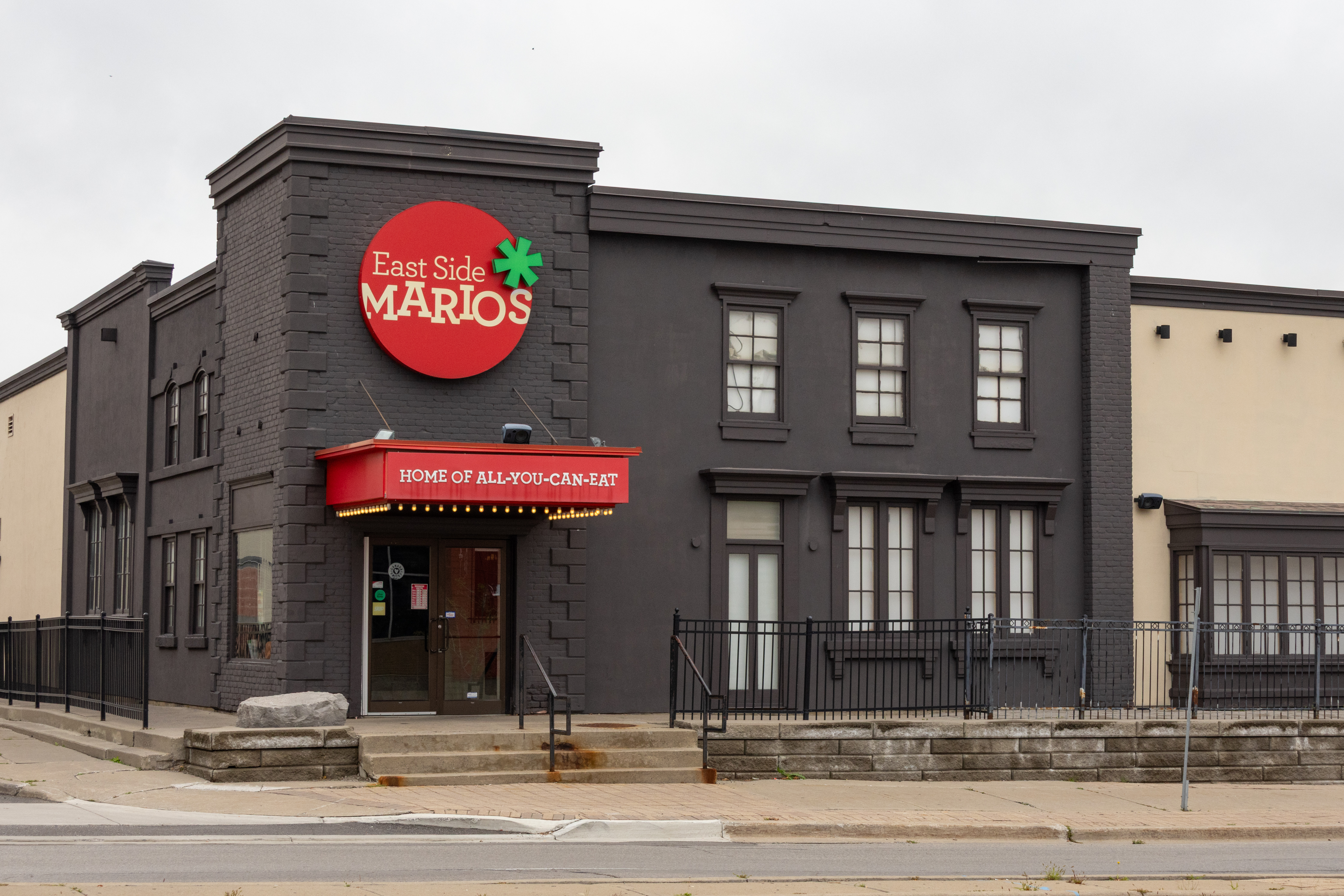
- An East Side Mario's location in Bowmanville, Ontario
- Type: Subsidiary
- Industry: Casual dining restaurant
- Founded: 1987; 39 years ago
- Headquarters: Vaughan, Ontario, Canada
- Parent: Recipe Unlimited
- Website: www.eastsidemarios.com

East Side Mario's is a Canadian chain of casual dining restaurants, managed by its parent holding company Recipe Unlimited. The restaurant specializes in Italian-American cuisine. Individual locations aim to recreate the historic ambience found at the corner of Canal Street and Mulberry Street in Lower Manhattan. The brand is marketed as "A taste of little Italy". It is best recognized by its original logo featuring the Statue of Liberty (Liberty Enlightening the World) holding a large tomato in place of a torch, as well as the jingle containing the catch phrase "Hey, budda boom, budda bing!".

It has 62 locations in Canada.

== History ==
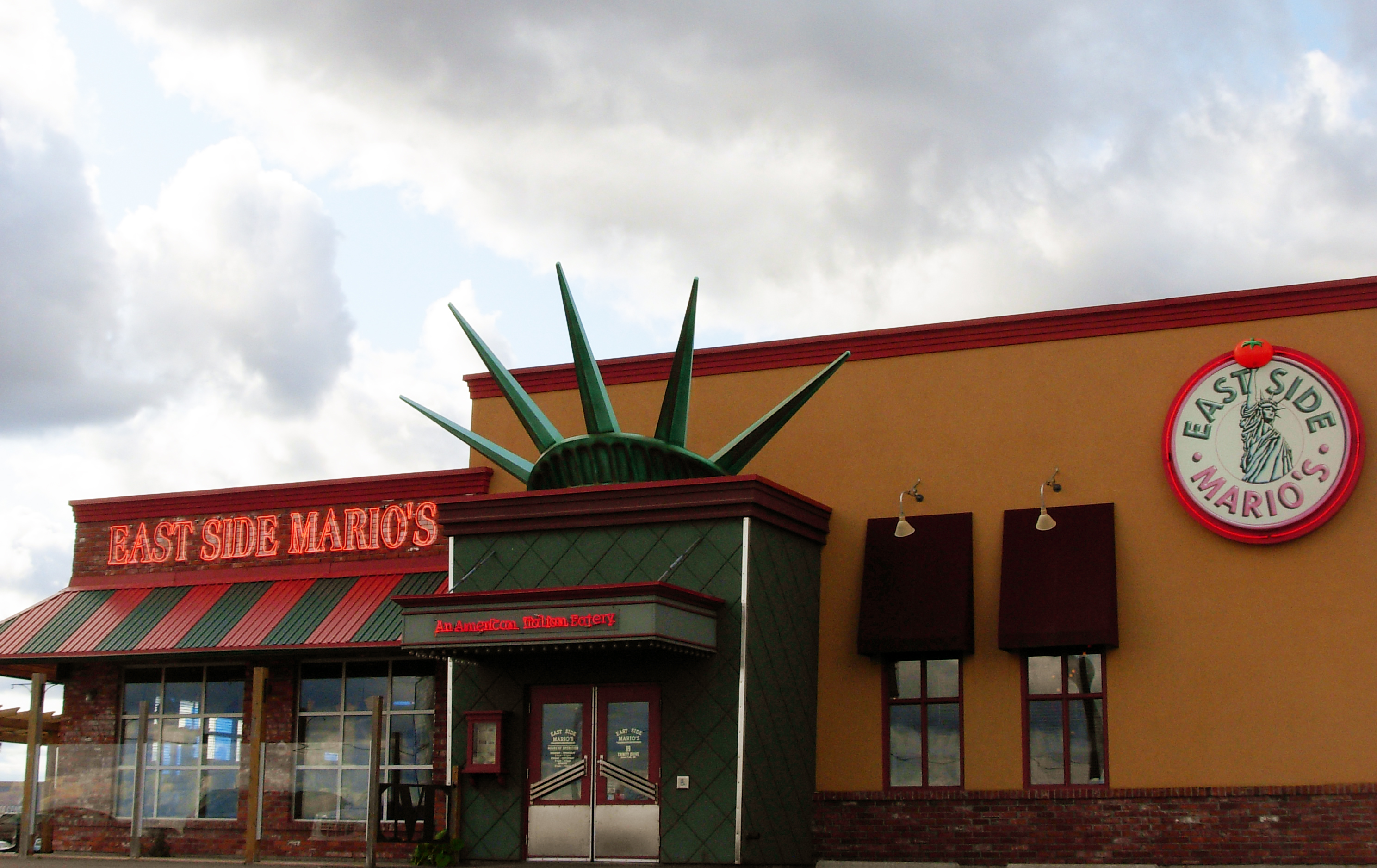
An East Side Mario's location in Moncton, New Brunswick

East Side Mario's was developed through the merger between several restaurant chains and began as a subsidiary of Yesac Creative Foods (later, Prime Restaurants).

In February 1980, Sudbury, Ontario, entrepreneurs Nick Perpick, Ralph Roy and Gary Ceppetelli, opened the first Casey's restaurant. The restaurant's success prompted the opening of a second location in Elliot Lake, Ontario. The company moved to Burlington, Ontario, and introduced a fourth partner. The Casey's brand was developed by the original parent company, Yesac Creative Foods. In 1982, the first Pat & Mario's Restaurant was opened in Whitby, Ontario. The objective was to establish a takeout pizza and pasta business. The venture was successful and the Pat & Mario's chain expanded into the Toronto area, as well as into the United States, in Florida.

The first East Side Mario's restaurant was developed and built in Aventura Mall in Miami, Florida. To expand the business on both sides of the border, it was necessary for Yesac to raise capital. To do so, the collective brands of Casey's, East Side Mario's, and Pat & Mario's merged with the Lime Rickey's brand from Toronto to become Prime Restaurant Holdings Incorporated in August 1989. Prime Restaurants has become a major force in the current Canadian restaurant industry largely in part because of this acquisition. By 1993, Prime Restaurants had expanded East Side Mario's throughout the United States through an American subsidiary. Because of the high potential of this restaurant chain, the American subsidiary was later purchased by PepsiCo's Pizza Hut division ( which eventually sold ESM to Marie Callendar's in 1997), and Prime Restaurants retained exclusive rights to the Canadian trademarks. As of February 2000, Prime Restaurants had re-acquired global trademark rights to East Side Mario's Restaurants Inc. On July 22, 2002, the parent company made an initial public offer for the Prime Restaurant Royalty Income Fund, allowing for public investing in the brand.

As of 2010, three members of senior management retained 18% ownership under Prime Restaurants, with the other 82% belonging to Fairfax Financial Holdings Limited. In October 2013, Fairfax exchanged ownership of the Prime Restaurants brand, by selling to Cara Operations with a warrant and cash deal. In October 2013, Fairfax bought a minority interest in Cara Operations. Cara in turn bought, and assumed debt from, Prime Restaurants. Fairfax also contributed $100 Million in secondary warrants, declaring a loss of approximately $50 Million in the process.

East Side Mario's began a partnership with Scene in February 2015.

East Side Mario's closed its last United States location, in Livonia, Michigan, in May 2020.

== Franchise ==
The menu primarily offers Italian-American style food, with an emphasis on pasta, as well as classic entrees, such as pizza and chicken dishes. The interior design is styled after New York Italian eateries of the mid-20th century. In 2008, East Side Mario's revamped their franchise design and menu. The new menu had a healthier focus, promising that no artificial trans fats and fresher ingredients were to be used. Their restaurants received an updated look, mixing styles from the Old World Italy with the more contemporary North American Little Italy. The logo also changed; a red tomato replaced the established figure of the Statue of Liberty.

In some tourist venues, such as airports and ONroute service centres, the chain also operates smaller East Side Mario's Pronto! locations, offering a scaled-down fast food version of the East Side Mario's menu.

== Advertising & marketing ==
The original logo, including the Statue of Liberty (Liberty Enlightening the World)

The previous logo, used until 2013

East Side Mario's has produced a variety of both chain-wide and regional promotional offers. These have included local radio contests and giveaways in association with communities. Similar to other restaurant chains, East Side Mario's has a longstanding promotion that offers free meals for young children, marketed for families. The franchise has also engaged in advertising partnerships with other companies such as Budweiser. In 2010, East Side Mario's took advantage of the FIFA World Cup and launched a campaign, declaring itself as the "soccer headquarters".

In January 2010, East Side Mario's launched one of the largest 3 month long contests in Canadian casual dining history, the "Budda Boom Budda Ching" campaign. The contest totaled up to $10 million in prizes, and was created with support from East Side Mario's marketing partners Endeavour Marketing, Endo Marketing, Ron Christie Communications and Cowan & Company. This campaign was launched in conjunction with an ongoing social media strategy in which East Side Mario's uses its presence on Facebook in an effort to raise awareness of promotions among consumers.

== Charitable work ==
East Side Mario's has been a corporate sponsor of the Canadian Breast Cancer Foundation in the past. In early May 2010, it was the national family restaurant sponsor of the 2010 Canadian Breast Foundation CIBC "Run for the Cure" fundraising event. The partnership included in-house promotions to help raise awareness about breast cancer.

East Side Mario's has also provided corporate sponsorship of Camp Oochigeas, a volunteer-run and privately funded organization working out of Toronto, Ontario which provides a summer camp experience for children with cancer.

== Achievements/Awards ==
East Side Mario's has been recognized for its success in the past. It has appeared on Canada's 50 Best Managed Private Companies consistently since 2000.

== See also ==
- List of Italian restaurants
- List of Canadian restaurant chains
- List of assets owned by Recipe Unlimited
