= The Pickle Barrel =

Canadian restaurant chain

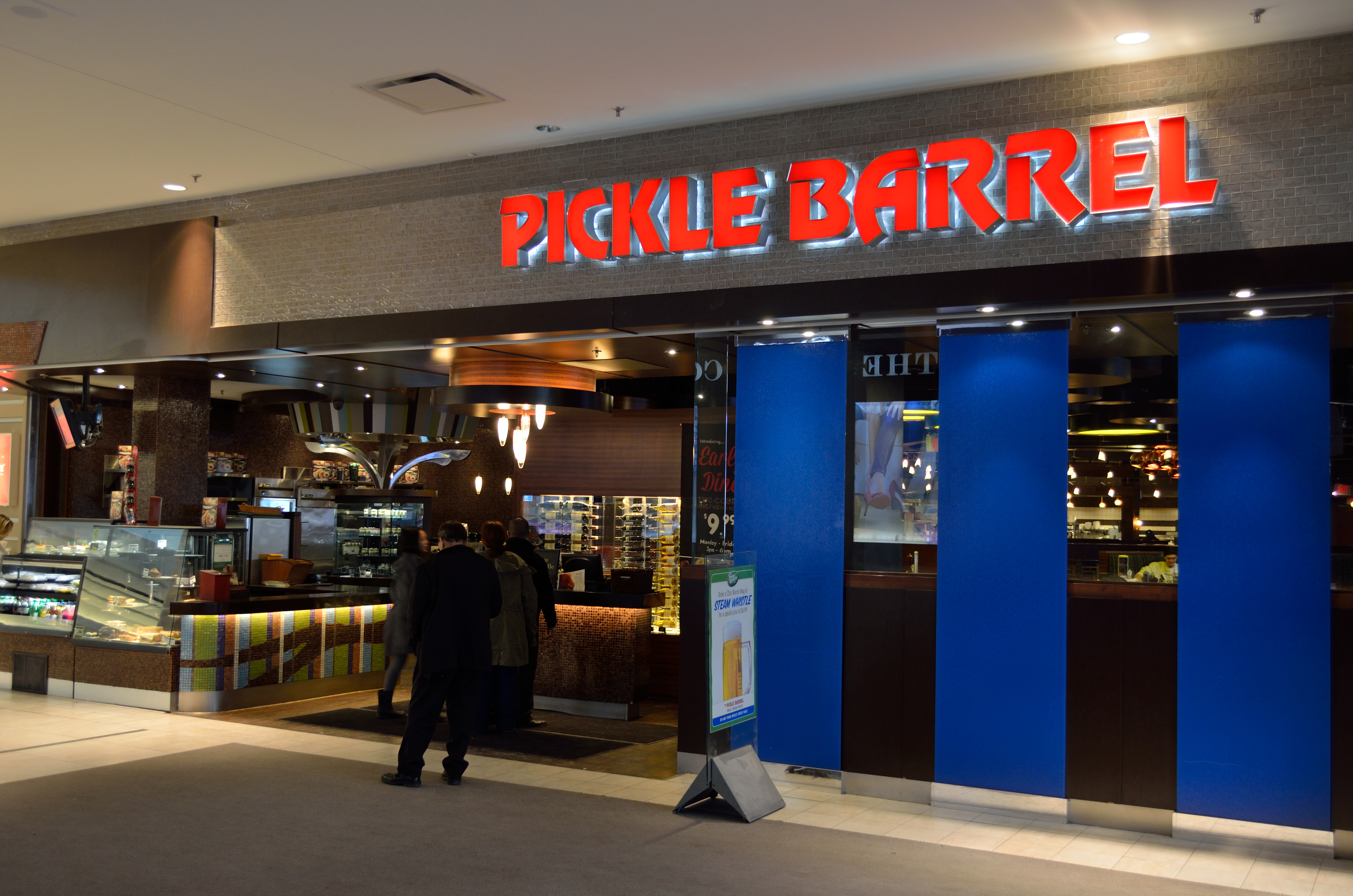
- Pickle Barrel in the Markville Shopping Centre in Markham, Ontario
- Type: Subsidiary
- Industry: Restaurants
- Founded: 1971; 55 years ago, in Toronto, Ontario
- Number of locations: 6
- Areas served: Canada
- Products: Ashkenazi Jewish cuisine
- Parent: Recipe Unlimited
- Website: picklebarrel.ca

The Pickle Barrel is a Canadian restaurant chain. Originally opened in 1971 as a Jewish deli located on Leslie Street in Toronto, the restaurant now operates locations across southwestern Ontario.

== History ==
The first Pickle Barrel opened in 1971 as an 85-seat restaurant located on Leslie Street in Toronto. Over the subsequent decades, the restaurant expanded to become a chain with locations across the Greater Toronto Area (GTA).

On October 16, 2017, The Pickle Barrel was acquired by Cara Operations Limited (renamed Recipe Unlimited in 2018), a subsidiary of the holding company Fairfax Financial. The restaurant opened a location in Waterloo, Ontario in 2019, their first outside of the GTA.

== Operations ==
While Pickle Barrel originally operated as a Jewish deli with deli sandwiches as a signature item, its menu has since expanded to include over 300 items, including a menu of health-conscious items selected by nutritionist Rose Reisman. blogTO noted that the restaurant is "known for its lengthy menu and kitschy decor", including colorful leather booths and blown glass hanging lights.

In 2017, The Pickle Barrel reportedly generated CAD$50 million annually from restaurant sales and catering, and had to date catered over 1.2 million events.

In 2020, its Downtown Toronto location in The Atrium on Bay closed after four decades due to the COVID-19 pandemic, fewer people coming downtown as a result, and the lack of a patio for outdoor dining. In September 2022, the Pickle Barrel at Sherway Gardens in Etobicoke closed permanently. In February 2024, the chain's original location on Leslie closed after more than 50 years.
