= Harvey's =

Canadian fast food hamburger restaurant chain

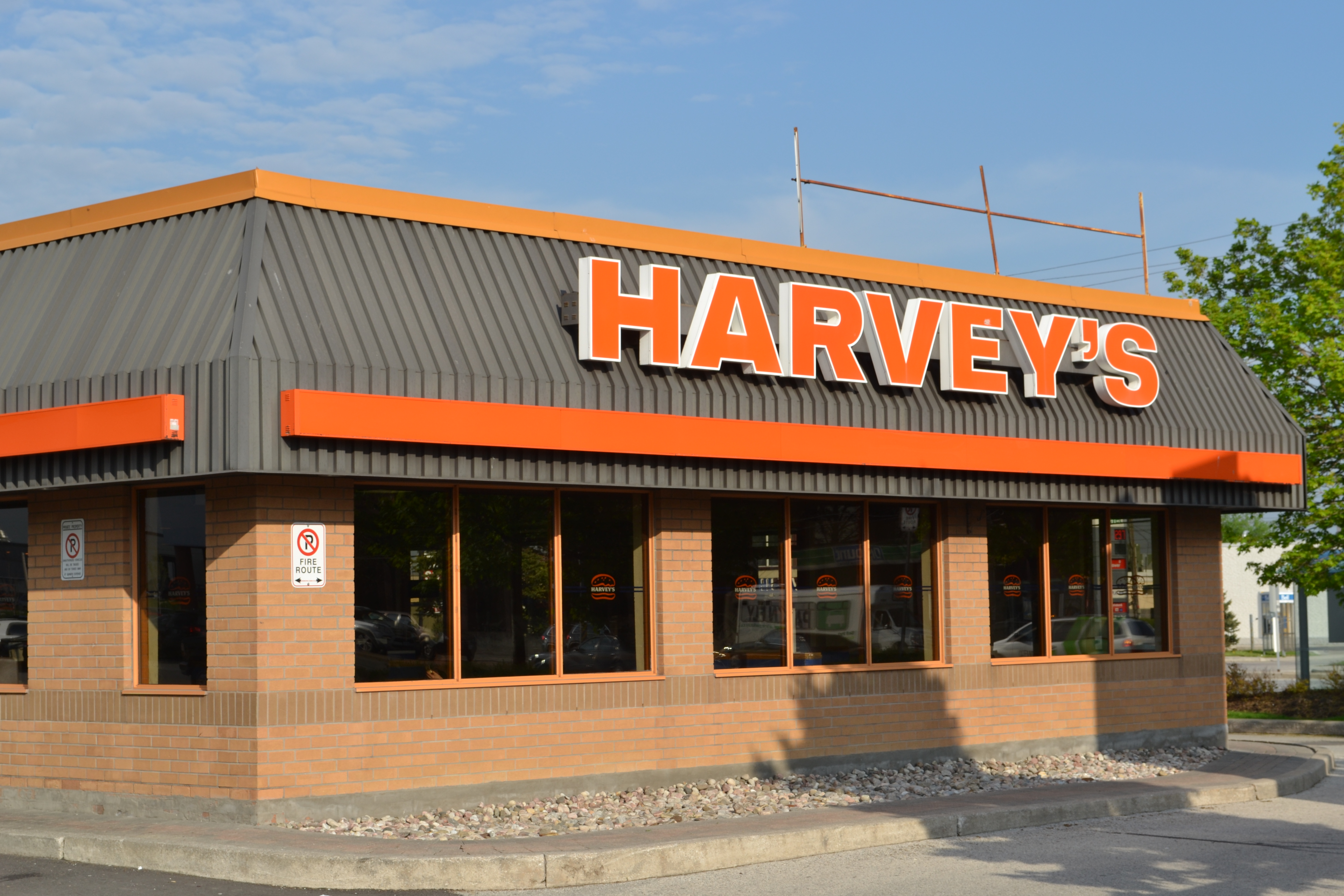
- A pre-2000s style Harvey's restaurant on the site of the original Harvey's location in Richmond Hill, Ontario in 2011 (demolished in 2012 for condominium development)
- Type: Subsidiary
- Industry: Restaurants
- Founded: April 1, 1959; 67 years ago Richmond Hill, Ontario, Canada
- Founders: George B. Sukornyk & Rick Mauran
- Headquarters: Vaughan, Ontario, Canada
- Number of locations: 290
- Area served: Canada (except British Columbia)
- Products: Fast food (including hamburgers, hot dogs, french fries, onion rings, poutines)
- Number of employees: 6,000
- Parent: Recipe Unlimited (1979–present)
- Website: harveys.ca

Harvey's is a fast food restaurant chain operating in Canada, with locations in every province except British Columbia. It serves hamburgers, poutine, hot dogs, french fries, onion rings, and other traditional Canadian fast-food fare. The chain is owned by Recipe Unlimited (previously known as Cara Operations).

Opened in 1959, the company is one of Canada's longest-standing Canadian owned and operated restaurants. It is known for its grilled burgers and for providing customers with a choice of various toppings.

== History ==
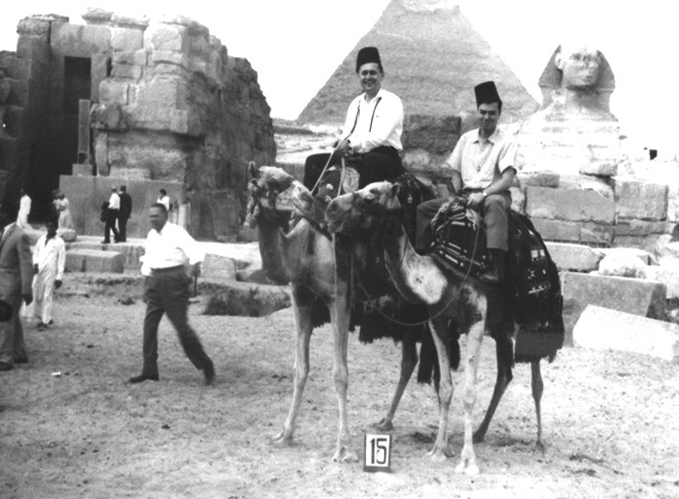
Harvey's Foods co-founders, George B. Sukornyk (pictured left) and Rick Mauran (right) at the Pyramids in Cairo, Egypt, in 1962

=== 1959 and 1960s: inception and growth ===
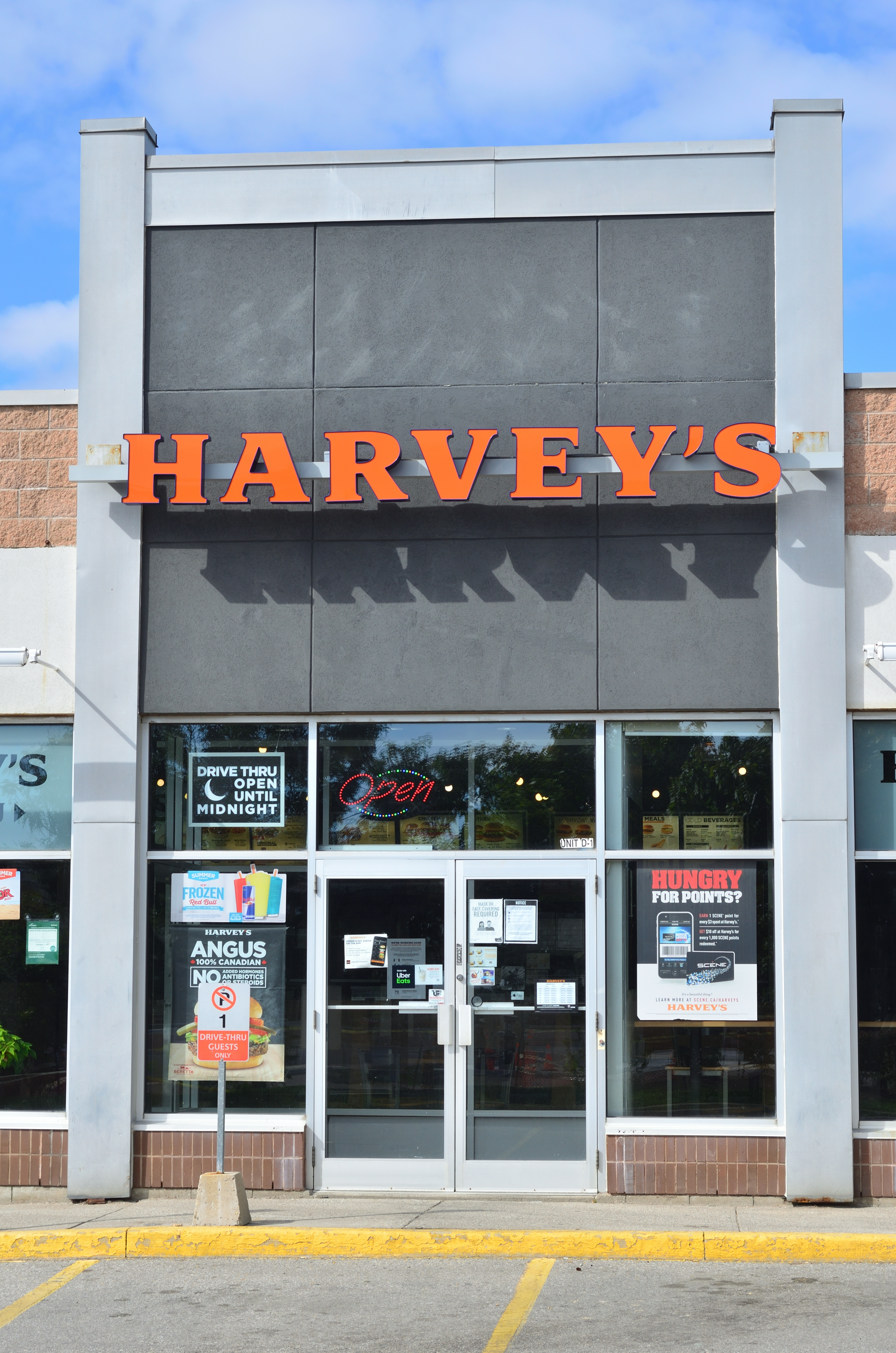
Harvey's in Richmond Hill in 2020

Harvey's was co-founded by George B. Sukornyk and Rick Mauran in early 1959 as equal shareholders. Mauran originally thought to call the chain Humphrey's, riffing off of the down-home friendliness connoted by the Henry's Hamburgers chain that was already successful in the United States at the time (today, only one Henry's restaurant survives). As he was preparing to open the first restaurant in the summer of 1959, he saw an item in the now defunct Toronto Telegram indicating that the John Harvey Motors car dealership in the city was closing, and the sign — which simply designated it Harvey's — was available. Mauran obtained the sign and posted it outside his flagship store.

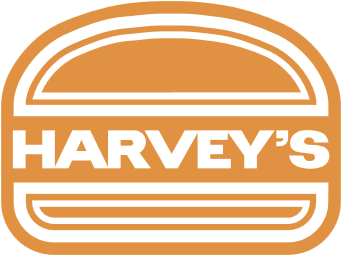
Harvey's logo from 1974 until 1999

The first Harvey's location was opened on April 1, 1959, at the southeast corner of Yonge Street and Observatory Lane in Richmond Hill, Ontario, on a 10-acre (40,000 m^{2}) parcel of land purchased from the owner of a bankrupt Dairy Queen. The location was initially expected to be seasonal, based on the precedent of the local Dairy Queen location, but it was successful enough to remain open year-round. The first franchised location was on the company owned property on Avenue Road. Subsequently, the land was purchased for additional locations to be developed and franchised in Etobicoke, Hamilton and Scarborough.

In 1959, Harvey's introduced three original concepts in the drive-in take-out business. The first concept was for a customer to order, purchase and obtain a receipt, which was placed on the topping counter. The cash was immediately placed in the cash register, thereby controlling and monitoring cash, and keeping theft to a minimum. The second concept was to have the customer move along the counter, following their receipt, and then, at their request, have an employee customize their hamburger with a variety of toppings. The third concept — developed for its full-line Swiss Chalet restaurants in Montreal — was to purchase potatoes from Prince Edward Island, have the franchisee wash and cut the fresh potatoes into oversized chips with skin on, and then deep-fry and serve the chips on-site. This approach was a distinction between thin pre-frozen and pre-cut French Fries of unknown origin that were being sold at the time. Ten years later, under different management, the number of toppings was substantially increased, and pre-frozen and pre-cut string French Fries were introduced, replacing the freshly cut PEI potato.

=== 1970s: Foodcorp and Cara acquisition ===
Harvey's Food Limited merged with Industrial Growth Limited in the early 1970s to form Foodcorp, led by president Bernie Syron. The company grew to operate 80 restaurants, and was acquired by Cara Operations in 1979, which has since rebranded as Recipe Unlimited.

=== 2010–present: Great Canadian and Health Check ===
After going through four different flagship burgers in twenty years, Harvey's introduced the Great Canadian as its flagship burger in 2010. It was discontinued in 2013 and replaced by the Angus burger, which has served as the chain's flagship burger since then.

In February 2012, the first Harvey's location was demolished to make way for condominiums. In the summer of 2012, Harvey's added Dole Strawberry Kiwi as a fountain juice. Later in November 2012, Harvey's introduced a Health Check approved section for its menu. This includes the veggie burger, the grilled chicken sandwich, the Lil' Original and the grilled chicken salad. Only approved toppings, condiments and dressings may be used on the sandwiches for them to meet the Health Check requirements. The Lil' Original has a price of $1.99, which is comparable to those found on competitors' value-priced burgers.

== Products ==
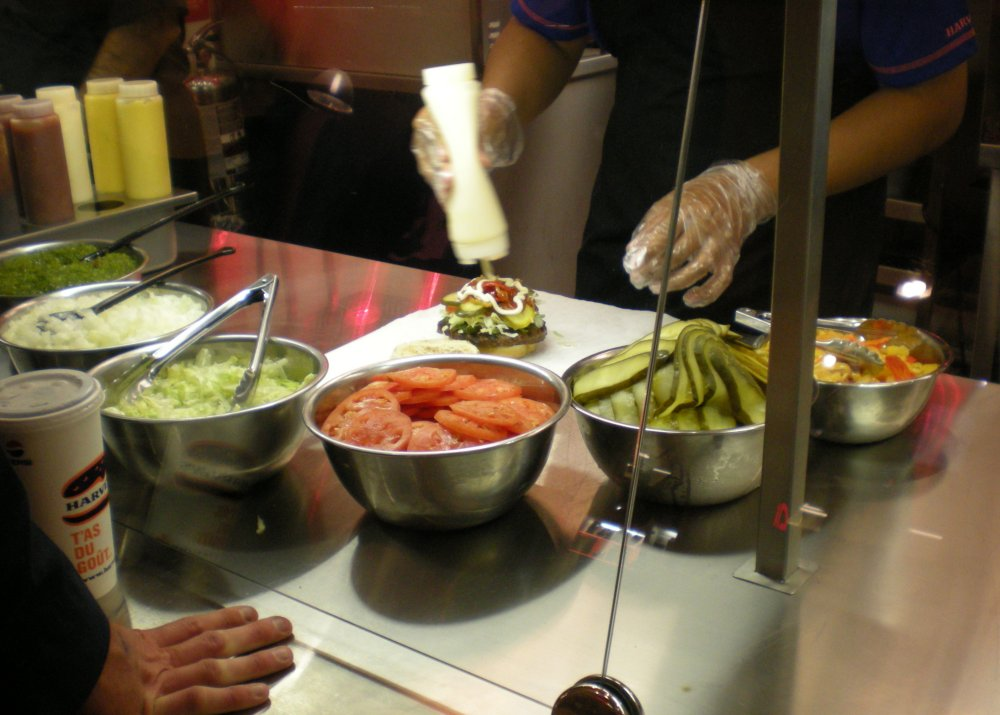
A Harvey's employee garnishing a single burger

=== Operations ===
Harvey's claims that, in 1998, they were the first to introduce "Custom Combos", allowing customers to modify their combo with different items from those usually included. At a select number of locations, breakfast is served along with "Frings" ("Fridelles" in French), which are half french fries and half onion rings.

As of December 2019, Harvey's employed more than 7,000 employees and operated 274 restaurant locations across Canada.

=== Flagship burger ===
Harvey's has changed flagship burgers several times before introducing the current Angus in 2014:

- Superburger (1989–1996, 1/3 lb)
- Ultra Burger (1996–2001, 1/4 lb, "steak-like")
- Big Harv (2001–2007, 2022–present)
- Angus Burger (2007–2010)
- Great Canadian (2010–2013, over 1/3 lb)
- Great Canadian Angus (2013–2014, over 1/3 lb. Introduced Spring 2013)
- Angus (2014–present, 1/4 lb. A Double Angus 1/2 lb burger is also available. Introduced Spring 2014.)

Harvey's introduced their Angus burger series as a competitive measure to McDonald's, which first introduced its own Angus burgers in Canada in 2008. Harvey's presently uses all-Canadian beef.

== Legal disputes ==
=== E. coli outbreak ===
In October 2008, over 200 people were infected with the O157:H7 strain of E. coli due to contaminated onions at the North Bay, Ontario, location. There was a class action lawsuit against Harvey's; the result was a cheque for $1,000 to $7,250 per victim.

=== Harvey's vs. Hardee's ===
There is no affiliation between Harvey's and the American hamburger chain Hardee's. The latter's parent company CKE Restaurants has been prevented from opening stores in Canada under the Hardee's name due to a trademark dispute. CKE has instead launched the Carl's Jr. brand in Canada.

== Loyalty program ==
Harvey's began a partnership with Scene in February 2015.

They are also a CAA Partner.

== Advertising ==
Harvey's advertising takes the form of promotional coupons, social media presence on Facebook and television commercials.

=== Free Burger Week ===
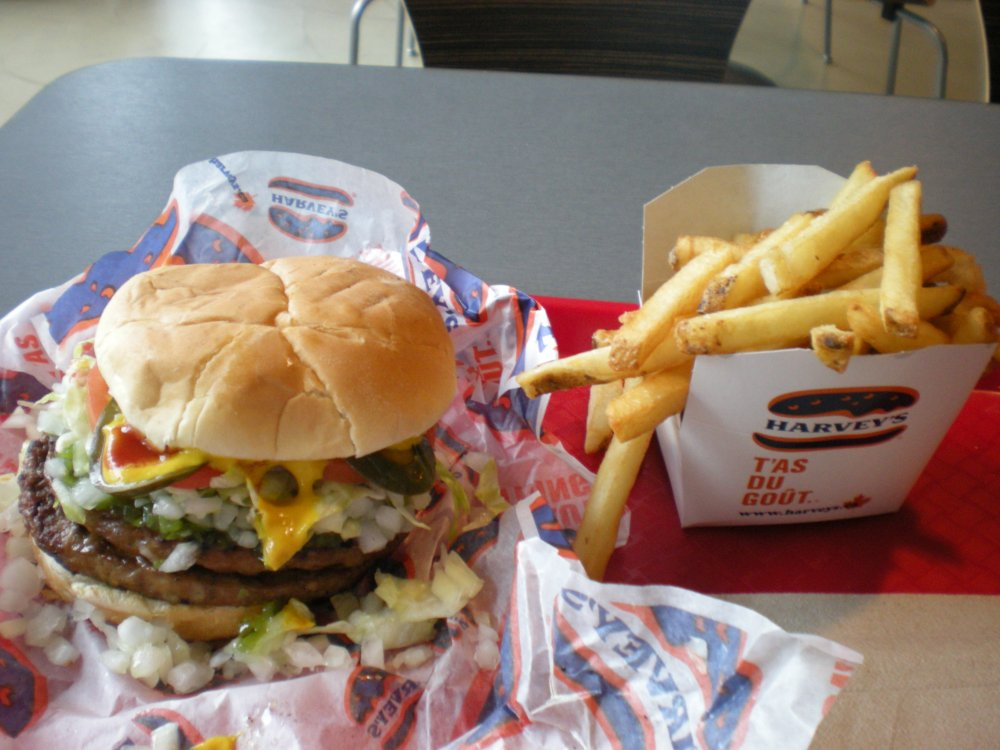
A Harvey's double burger plus fries

On the last Sunday of May each year in 2007, 2008 and 2009, Harvey's held a Free Original Hamburger Day at all locations across Ontario and Quebec. The purpose of this event was to "celebrate Canada's best tasting burger" and to attract new customers who might not otherwise go into Harvey's. These events were loss leader sales where Harvey's hoped to sell side items and create customer loyalty. The event was extended across Canada in 2008, and later in 2009 to coincide with the chain's 50th anniversary. All these events were limited to one free burger per person. From 2010 onward, the event was changed to a "Free Burger Week" in June of every year, but now works as a "buy one, get one free" instead of a completely free burger. However, there is no longer a limit of one per person, and any burger (including chicken and veggie) can be obtained with the new deal.

=== Slogans ===
Year	English	French
1970s	"Harvey's makes a hamburger a beautiful thing."	—N/a
1980s	—N/a	"Harvey's fait de bien bonnes choses, oui de bien bonnes choses." ("Harvey's doing really good things, yes, really good things.") "Et chaque bouchée dit que c'est Harvey's." ("And every mouthful says that it's Harvey's.")
1980s–present	"Harvey's makes your hamburger a beautiful thing."	—N/a
Early 1990s	"Harvey's: beautiful choice."	—N/a
1990s	—N/a	"Tu connais mes goûts, Harvey's." ("You know my tastes, Harvey's.")
1992–1993	"We make you spoiled with charbroiled."	—N/a
1994–1995	"When you want what you want, you want Harvey's."	—N/a
1999–2000	"Just the way you like it."	—N/a
2000–2003	"Real. Big. Taste."	"Du goût. Du vrai." ("Taste. The real thing.")
2003–2006	"Long live the grill."	"Vive le grill." ("Long live the grill.")
2003–2006	"Noooo problem."	—N/a
2003–2006	"Meat. Fire. Good."	—N/a
2006–present	"It's a beautiful thing."	—N/a
2006–2010	—N/a	"T'as du goût." ("You have taste.")
2010–present	—N/a	"À chacun son burger." ("To each his burger.")
2023-present	"It's a Canadian thing."	—N/a

== Retail presence ==
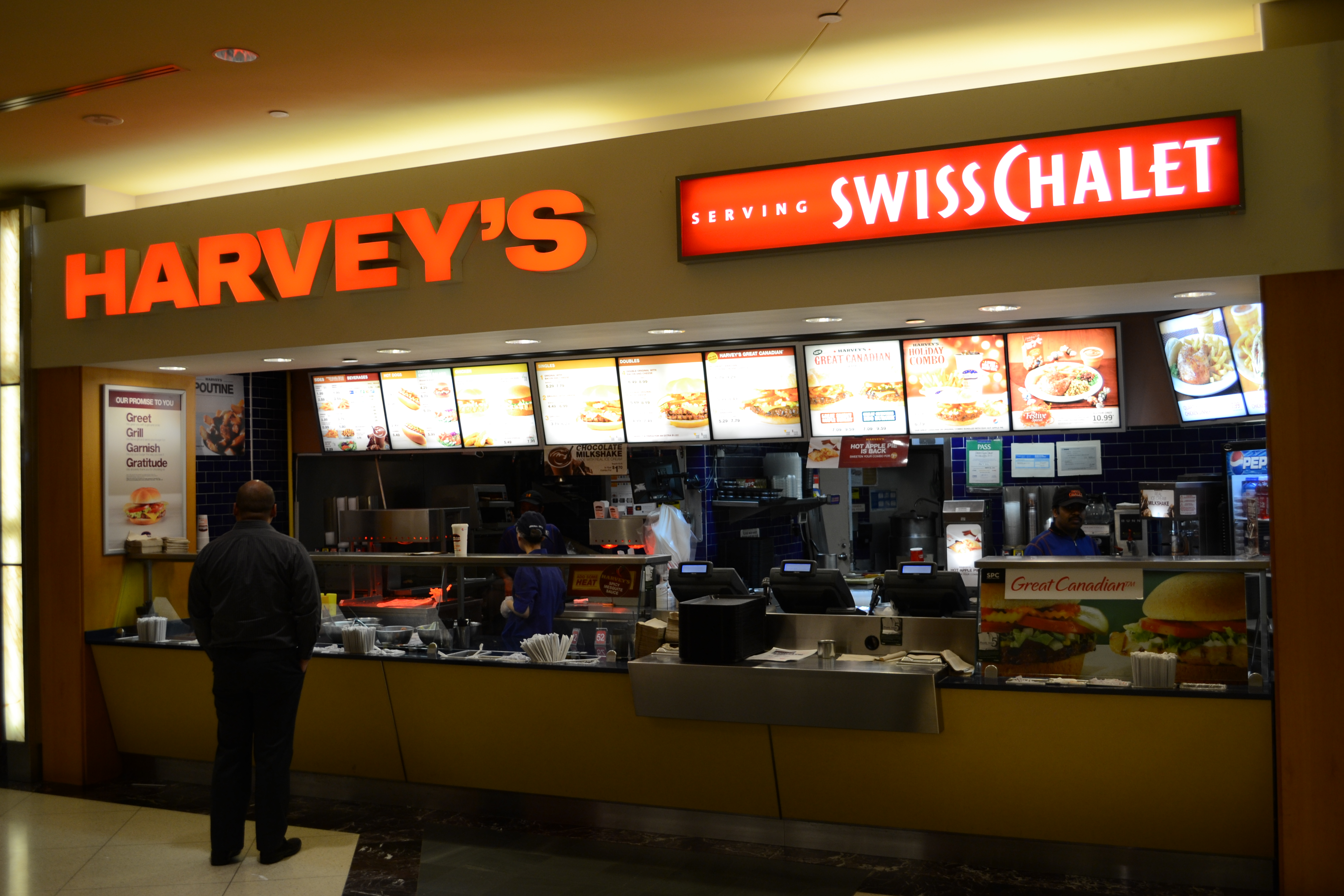
Harvey's combined with a Swiss Chalet

In the early 1990s, some Harvey's locations featured items from the American chain Church's Chicken. After Cara acquired Harvey's, the Church's partnership was ceased and replaced with Swiss Chalet. In some cases, locations are adjacent to or co-located with Swiss Chalet locations. There are also a few Home Depot Harvey's stores that are co-located with Second Cup, a coffee chain that used to be owned by Cara.

== See also ==
- Hooker Harvey's, a Toronto outlet at Jarvis Street and Gerrard Street with a reputation for procuring and prostitution
- List of Canadian restaurant chains
- List of hamburger restaurants
- List of assets owned by Recipe Unlimited
