= Franworks Group =

Canadian restaurant chain operator

- Company type: Subsidiary
- Industry: Food service
- Genre: Premium casual
- Founded: 2000; 26 years ago, in Calgary, Alberta
- Headquarters: Calgary, Alberta
- Number of locations: 96 (2023)
- Areas served: Canada; United States
- Products: Food and drink
- Parent: Recipe Unlimited
- Divisions: Original Joe's; Elephant & Castle; State & Main; Blanco Cantina; Añejo Restaurant
- Website: franworks.com

Franworks Group of Companies (also called “Franworks”) is a Calgary, Alberta based company which owns and operates restaurant concepts in Canada and the United States. They began in 2000 and shifted their focus to restaurants in 2002. In 2016, Recipe Unlimited acquired a majority stake in their restaurant brands. As of 2022, the company has roughly 100 restaurants and five restaurant brands in two countries: Original Joe’s, State & Main, Elephant and Castle, Añejo Restaurant and Blanco Cantina.

== Overview ==
State & Main Kitchen and Bar brand was developed and launched in 2012, expanding from Western Canada into Guelph, Ontario two years later. Now, State & Main has over 25 locations throughout four provinces.

Añejo Restaurant began on 4th Street, SW, in Calgary, and joined Franworks in 2019. The Añejo brand is growing and working to expand their concept throughout Canada and beyond.

Blanco Cantina became a part of Franworks in 2019 with the first restaurant opening on 17th Ave, SW, in Calgary. Through the pandemic, Blanco Cantina was able to open four additional locations over two provinces. They opened an Edmonton, Alberta location, and are continuing to grow throughout Canada.

== See also ==
- List of Canadian restaurant chains
- Recipe Unlimited
