= Prime Restaurants =

Canadian holding company

Prime Restaurants, Inc.
- Type: Subsidiary
- Industry: Restaurants
- Founded: Sudbury, Ontario (1980)
- Headquarters: Mississauga, Ontario, Canada
- Area served: all of Canada & 3 US states
- Key people: Nicholas Perpick & John Rothschild
- Products: Italian food, Irish pub, bar and grill, brasserie other food products
- Revenue: CDN$
- Parent: Recipe Unlimited (2013–2022) Foodtastic (2022–present)
- Subsidiaries: Fionn MacCool's; D'Arcy McGee's; Paddy Flaherty's; Tir Nan Og
- Website: http://www.primerestaurants.com http://www.primepubs.com/

Prime Restaurants Inc. (formerly Prime Restaurant Royalty Income Fund) was a Canadian holding company, which operated the restaurant chains East Side Mario's and Bier Markt, and Prime Pubs their Irish Pubs subsidiary which included: Tir Nan Og, Paddy Flaherty's, D'Arcy McGee's, and Fionn MacCool's.

Founded in Sudbury, Ontario in 1980 as Yesac Creative Foods, the company became Prime Restaurants in 1989 when it merged with the Lime Rickey's chain based in Toronto.

On January 10, 2012, Fairfax Financial completed its acquisition of Prime Restaurants. In October 31, 2022, Fairfax Financial entered into a strategic partnership with Cara Operations and Cara gained ownership of Prime Restaurants including Prime Pubs. In May 2018 Cara rebranded itself Recipe Unlimited. In 2022, Prime Pubs subsidiary of Prime Restaurants was sold to Foodtastic who run it under them under the banner Fionn MacCool's. East Side Mario's and Bier Markt were retained by Recipe Unlimited.

== See also ==
- List of Canadian restaurant chains
