= Milestones Grill and Bar =

Canadian restaurant chain

Milestones Restaurants Inc.

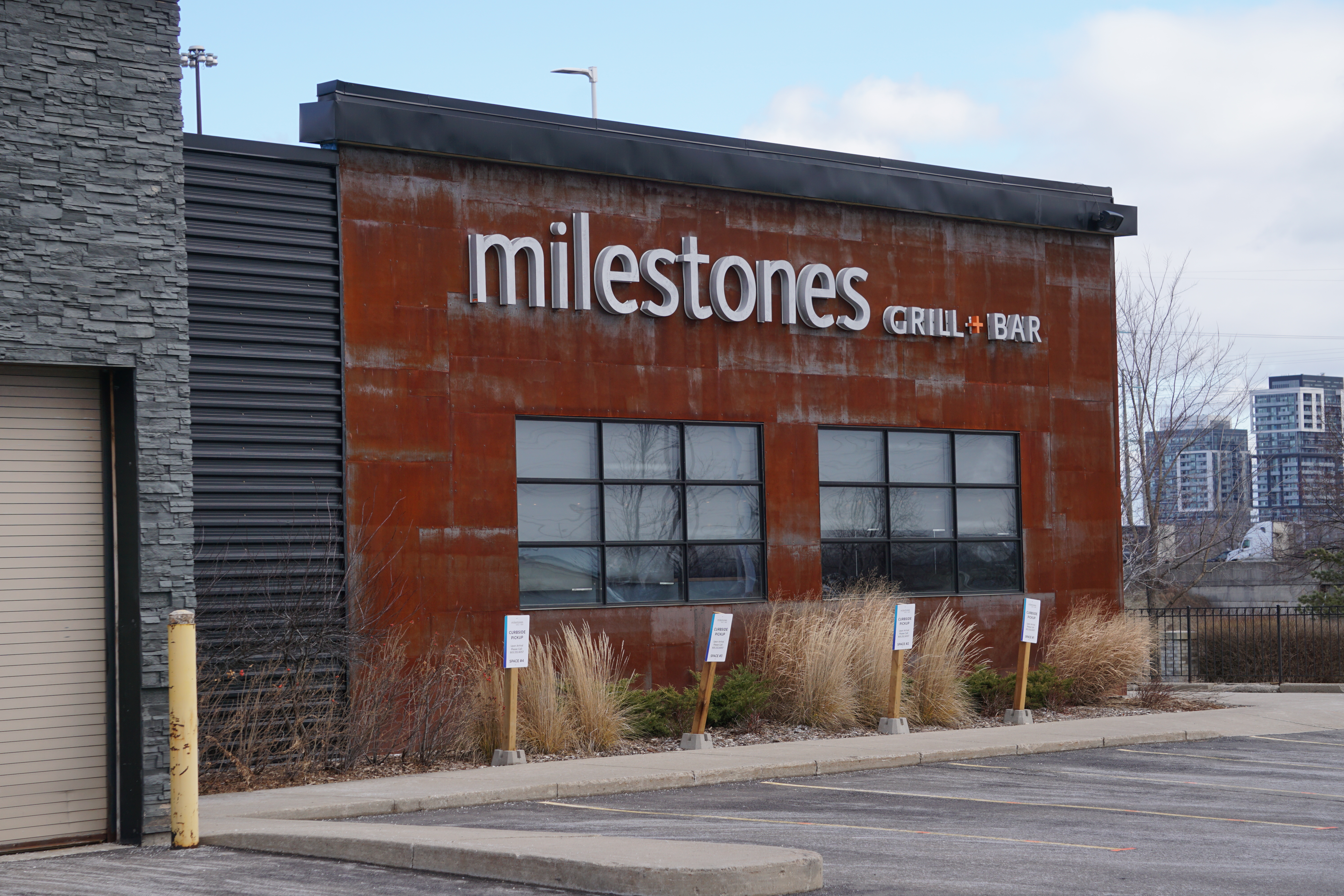
- A Milestones location in Burlington, Ontario
- Trade name: Milestones Grill and Bar
- Company type: Subsidiary
- Industry: Restaurants
- Founded: 1989; 37 years ago
- Headquarters: Montreal, Quebec, Canada
- Number of locations: 40+
- Products: Casual fine dining North American cuisine
- Number of employees: Approx. 4100
- Parent: Foodtastic
- Website: www.milestonesrestaurants.com

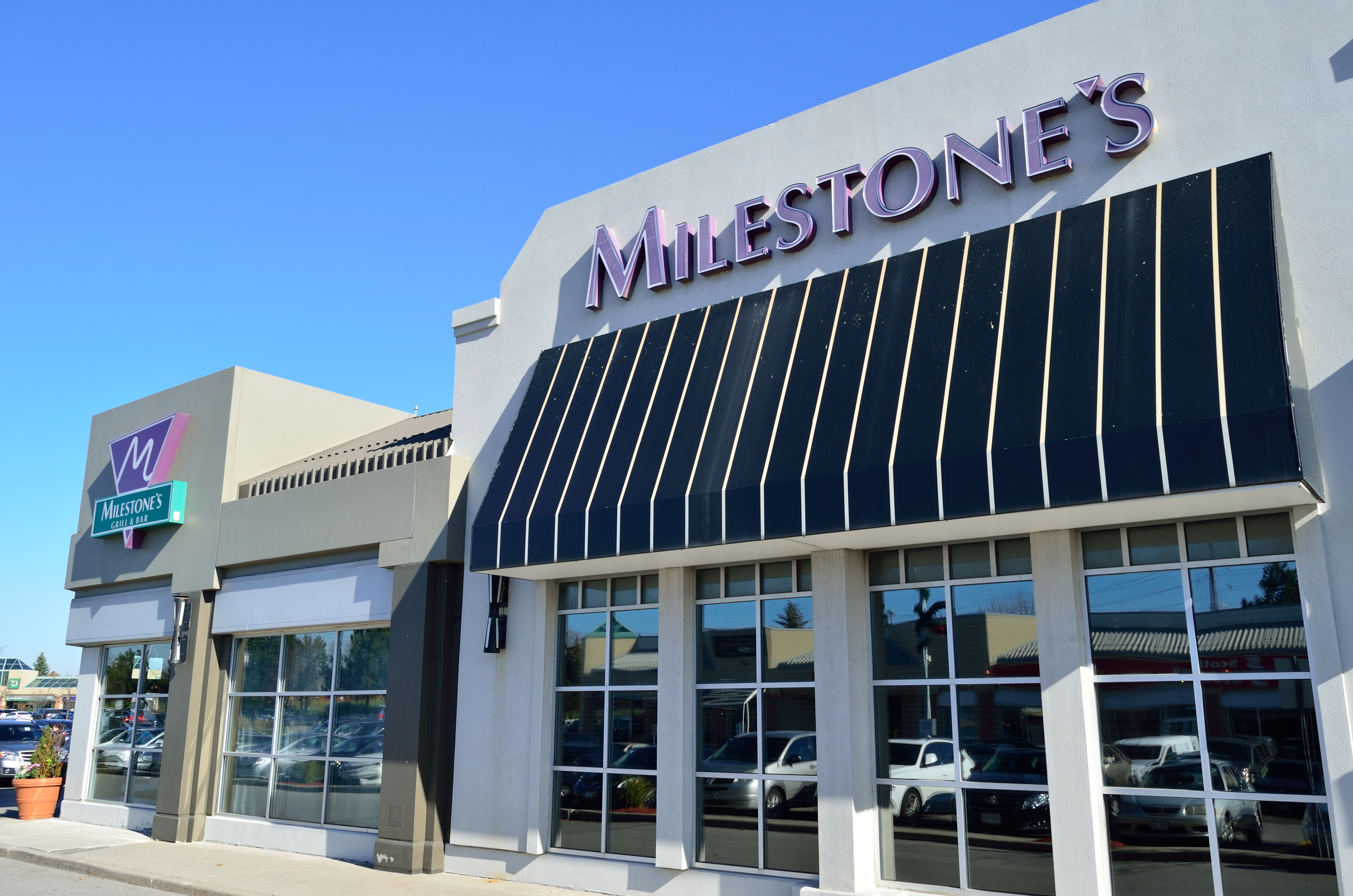
Milestones Grill and Bar in Markham

Milestones Restaurants Inc. (doing business as Milestones Grill and Bar) is a Canadian restaurant chain owned by Foodtastic. There are over 40 locations across British Columbia, Alberta, New Brunswick, Ontario, Nova Scotia, and Quebec.

== History ==
The first Milestones location opened on Denman Street in Vancouver, British Columbia, in 1989. In 2002, Cara (now known as Recipe Unlimited) purchased a majority stake in the restaurant from the previous parent company, BC-based Spectra Group, Inc. Prior to Cara's acquisition, nearly all Milestones restaurants were located in British Columbia, with four locations in Ontario and one in Washington state. Cara rapidly expanded Milestones operations into Ontario cities, including Toronto, Ottawa, Niagara Falls, and London. On July 14, 2021, Montreal-based restaurant franchiser Foodtastic acquired Milestones.

== See also ==
- List of Canadian restaurant chains
- List of assets owned by Recipe Unlimited
