= Elephant & Castle (restaurant) =

Canadian restaurant chain

Elephant & Castle Pub and Restaurant

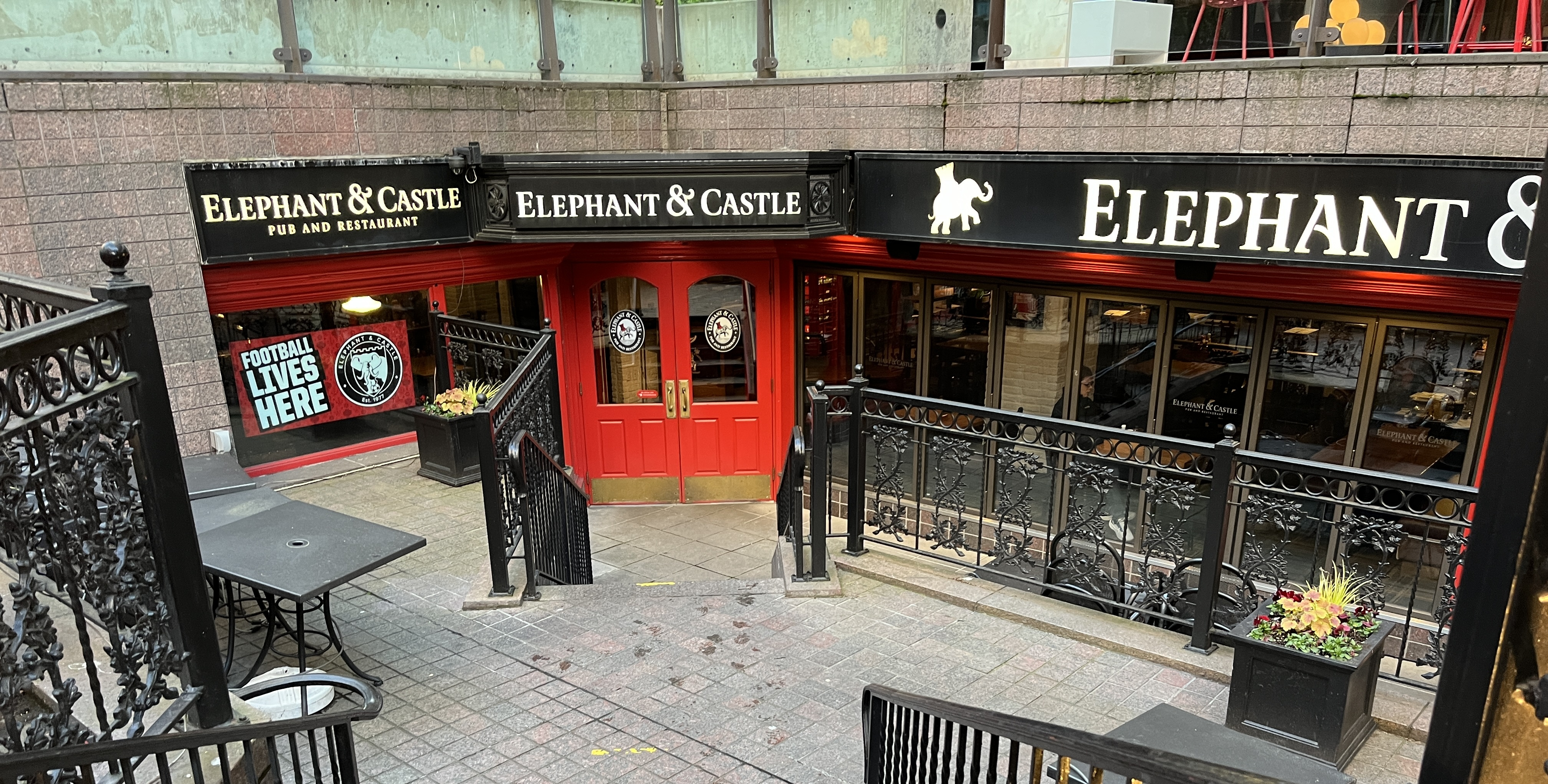
- Entrance to the restaurant in Seattle, 2024

Restaurant information
- Established: 1977
- Owner: Franworks Group

Elephant & Castle Pub and Restaurant, or simply Elephant & Castle (E&C), is a Canadian restaurant chain founded in 1977. The restaurants operate in Canada and the United States.

== Description ==
The restaurant chain Elephant & Castle operates "English pub-style" restaurants in Canada and the United States. The menu includes fish and chips and shepherd's pie.

== History ==
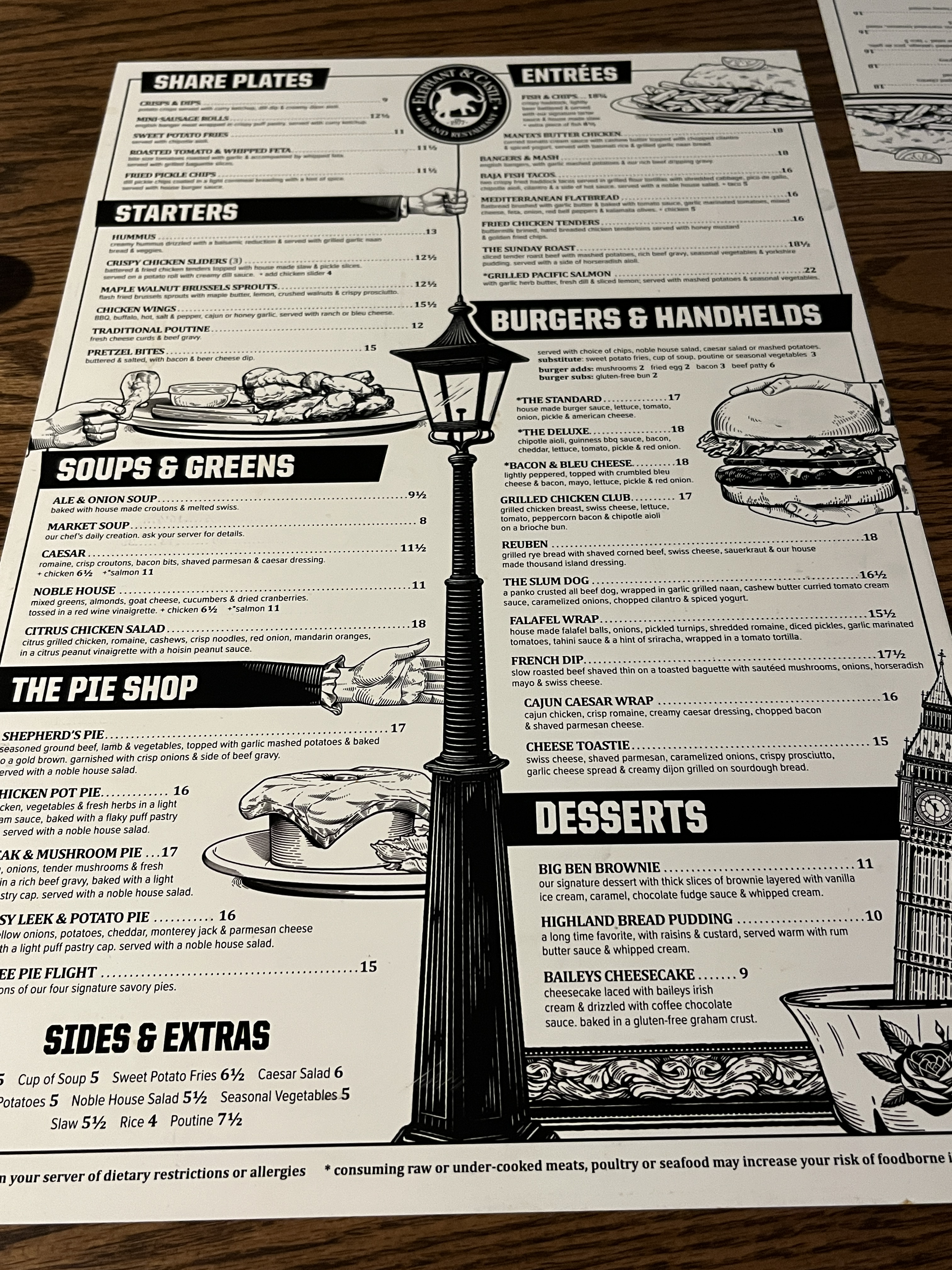
Food menu, Seattle, 2024

In 2012, a Canadian restaurant firm acquired Boston-based Elephant & Castle Group, which operated 19 establishments at the time and had filed for chapter 11 protection in 2011. Franworks Group owned and operated fourteen Elephant & Castle (E&C) restaurants, as of 2014, including five in Canada and nine in the U.S.

=== Locations ===
There were ten locations, as of 2016. In Canada, E&C restaurants operate in Calgary, Toronto, and Winnipeg. Previously, there were restaurants in Edmonton and Vancouver.

In the United States, E&C restaurants operate in Boston's Financial District, Chicago, Seattle, and Washington, D.C. Previously, there were restaurants in Philadelphia and San Francisco.

== Reception ==
In 2001, Anne Spiselman of Crain's Chicago Business said, "If you ever wondered why British food traditionally has had a bad reputation, eating at Elephant & Castle will provide some insight." In 2011, Ben Small of Newcity said, "E&C did a great job of recreating the world renowned pub fare. The batter was delectably crispy and the chips were chunky and well-cooked".

== See also ==
- List of restaurant chains
