= Kelseys Original Roadhouse =

Canadian restaurant chain

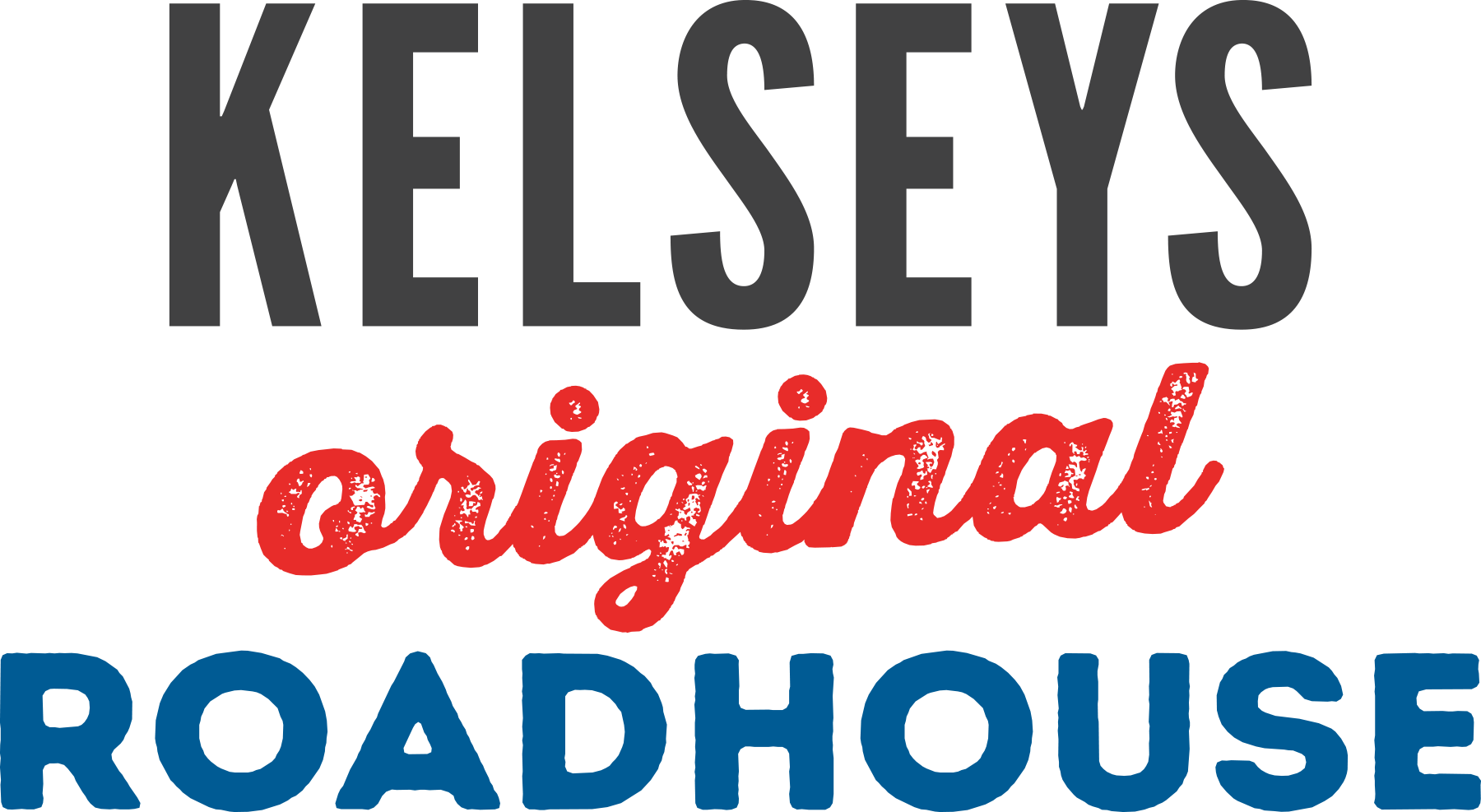

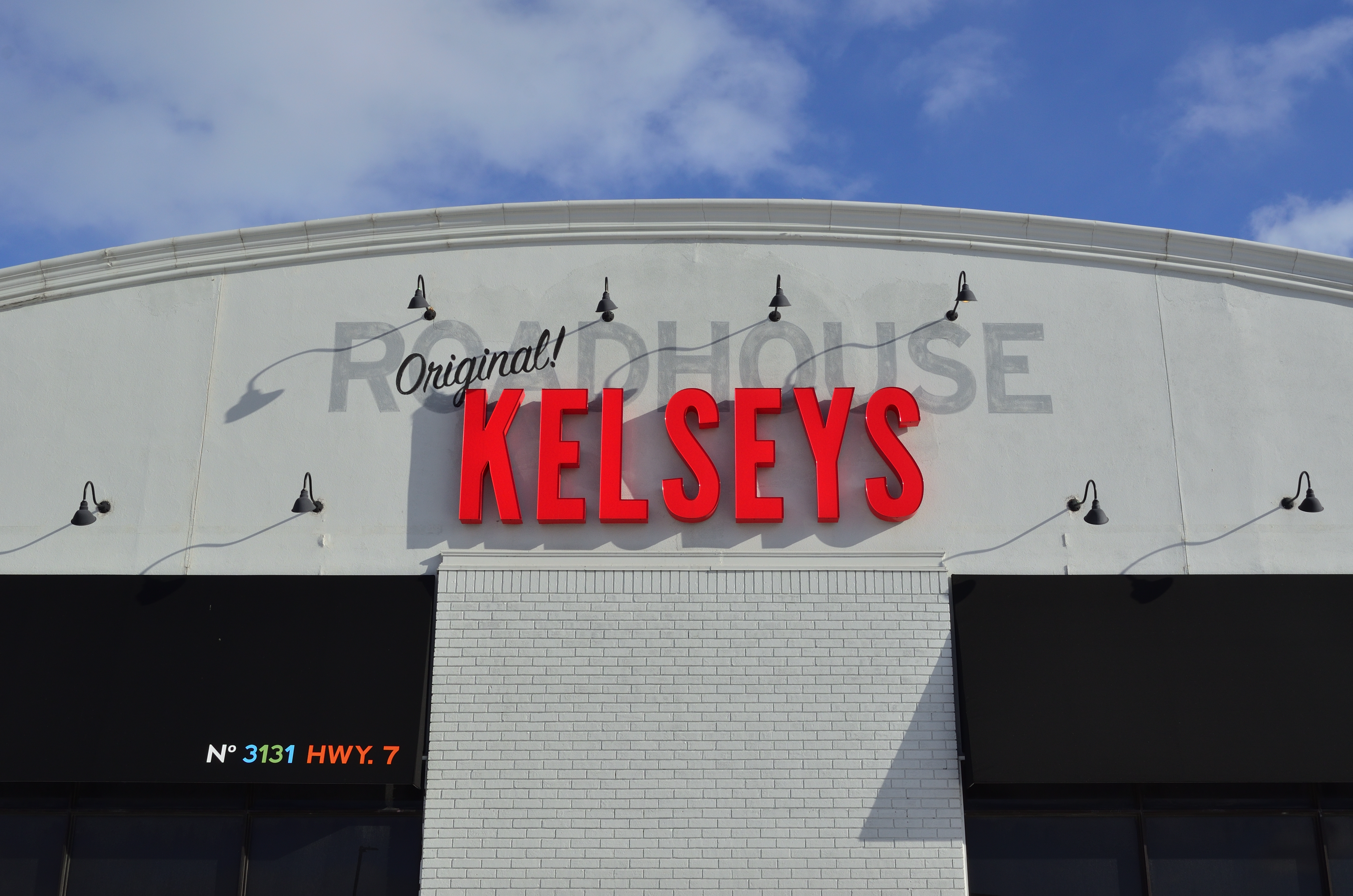
- Formerly: Kelsey's Neighbourhood Bar & Grill (1978–2015)
- Industry: Food service
- Founder: Paul Jeffery
- Headquarters: Vaughan, Ontario
- Number of locations: 66
- Area served: Eastern Canada
- Parent: Recipe Unlimited
- Website: kelseys.ca

Kelseys Original Roadhouse is a Canadian restaurant chain headquartered in Vaughan, Ontario owned by Recipe Unlimited. Founded in 1978, there are Kelseys restaurants in Ontario, New Brunswick, and Newfoundland and Labrador.

== History ==
Kelseys logo used from 2005 to 2015

Kelseys Original Roadhouse was founded by the Jeffery brothers, Paul, Peter, and Perry, who opened the first location in Oakville, Ontario, in 1978. Inspired by classic American roadhouses and their frequent road trips, they created a Canadian roadhouse concept featuring dishes like potato skins and New York-style wings. The restaurant's name honors the founder's favorite restaurant in the Chicago area, The Kelsey Road House at the corner of Northwest Highway and Kelsey Road in Lake Barrington, Illinois, an independent business that continues to operate as of 2026.

== Marketing ==
Kelseys has a licensing agreement through early 2011 with CBS Consumer Products for the rights to the theme song from the 1980s sitcom Cheers, which the chain says could lead to "other opportunities" in the future. Kelseys also uses the show's title in its slogan "Cheers to good friends", although (due to the generic nature of the word "cheers" in regards to pubs and the like) it is not clear whether permission from CBS was required for this.

== Rebranding ==
Kelseys' parent company Recipe Unlimited has been going through an era of rebranding and renovations including its location at 1011 The Queensway Etobicoke, Ontario where the company is piloting a new restaurant design that features an emphasis on a newer style of Kelseys dining experience. Many under-performing Kelseys restaurants have been closing down over the past couple of years and the new design is going to try to change the customer's eating experience to become more lively and exciting. The restaurant's old slogan "Neighbourhood Bar and Grill" has been updated to "Ambitiously Hardworking and Sociably Unpredictable". Bright neon colours are found throughout the restaurant along with an upgraded menu that features a smaller and more limited selection of the most popular items found at other Kelseys locations. The new bar menu that was first used at this Kelseys is now available throughout all 88 locations in Ontario, Manitoba and British Columbia. The new bar menu is modelled after its location in Etobicoke featuring bright neon colours along with new, pub-style items. The restaurant design is going to be applied to more locations when the franchisees choose to upgrade.

== Criticism ==
A CBC Marketplace investigation in February 2018 found the Kelseys servers in Ontario had to tip out 4% of their sales, a rise from 2% prior to the province's minimum wage increase.

== See also ==
- List of Canadian restaurant chains
- List of assets owned by Recipe Unlimited
