= Swiss Chalet =

Canadian casual dining restaurant chain

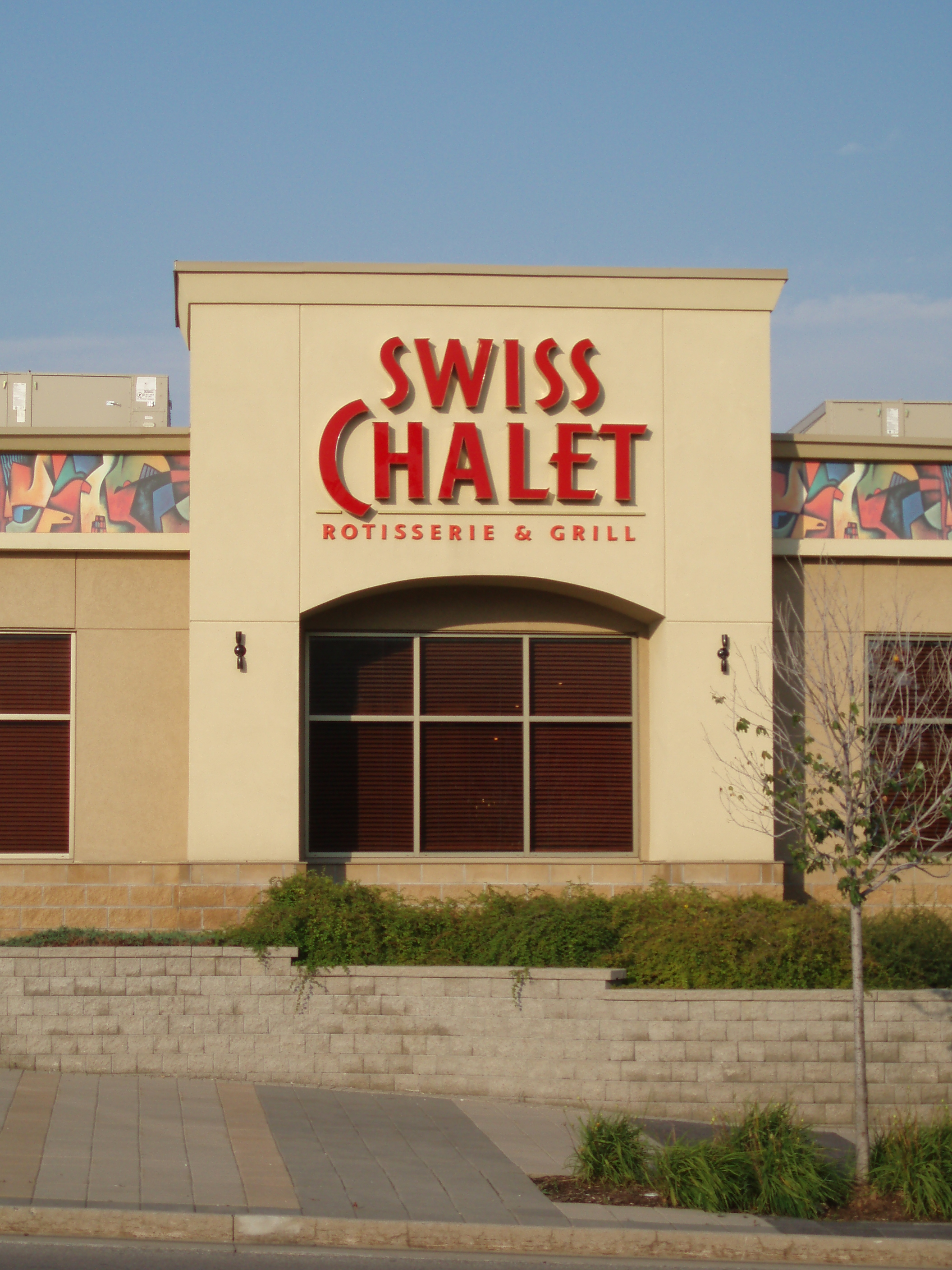
- A Swiss Chalet restaurant in Markham
- Type: Subsidiary
- Industry: Food service
- Founded: 1954; 72 years ago
- Headquarters: Toronto, Ontario, Canada
- Key people: Rick Mauran, Todd Barclay, Edgar Alvarez, Steven Greene, Michael Farley, Abhik Banerji
- Products: Rotisserie chicken Canadian cuisine
- Parent: Recipe Unlimited
- Website: www.swisschalet.com

Swiss Chalet is a Canadian chain of casual dining restaurants founded in 1954 in Toronto, Ontario, Canada. Swiss Chalet has locations in most Canadian provinces, but about 80% are in Ontario and there are currently none in Quebec or British Columbia. Swiss Chalet is among the holdings of Recipe Unlimited, which also owns the fast food chain Harvey's. Swiss Chalet and Harvey's franchises share many locations.

Swiss Chalet franchises include a variety of points of sale. The company's locations generally have an architectural alpine theme, a dining room, a take-out counter, and delivery. Some feature drive-thru windows while other locations in certain urban areas are only take-out counters and are more akin to fast food restaurants. The brand also has an online food ordering system. Recipe Unlimited retails signature Swiss Chalet sauce, gravy, and marinades (as powdered mixes) in Canadian supermarkets.

== History ==
The first Swiss Chalet restaurant, at 234 Bloor Street West in Toronto, operated for 52 years. It was founded by Rick Mauran, son of Maurice Mauran the founder of the still-extant Chalet BBQ of Montreal. The building featured exposed-beam ceilings in the Swiss chalet style. This store closed in 2006 and was demolished in 2009 as part of a condominium development.

In the early 2000s, Cara Operations closed all of its Quebec and US-based restaurants.

The company returned to Saskatchewan with a location in south Regina, although this location no longer shows on its website. In 2008, Air Canada added Swiss Chalet food products to its buy-on-board menu.

In 2010, two of the three remaining Swiss Chalet restaurants in the United States closed. They were located in the suburbs of Buffalo, New York. On June 1, 2011, the only company restaurant operating in Puerto Rico closed.

The company began a partnership with the Scene+ loyalty program in February 2015.

On March 31, 2016, the company's parent, Cara Operations, announced that it would acquire St-Hubert, a Quebec-based chain of rotisserie chicken restaurants, in the summer of 2016 for CAD$537 million.

== Fare ==
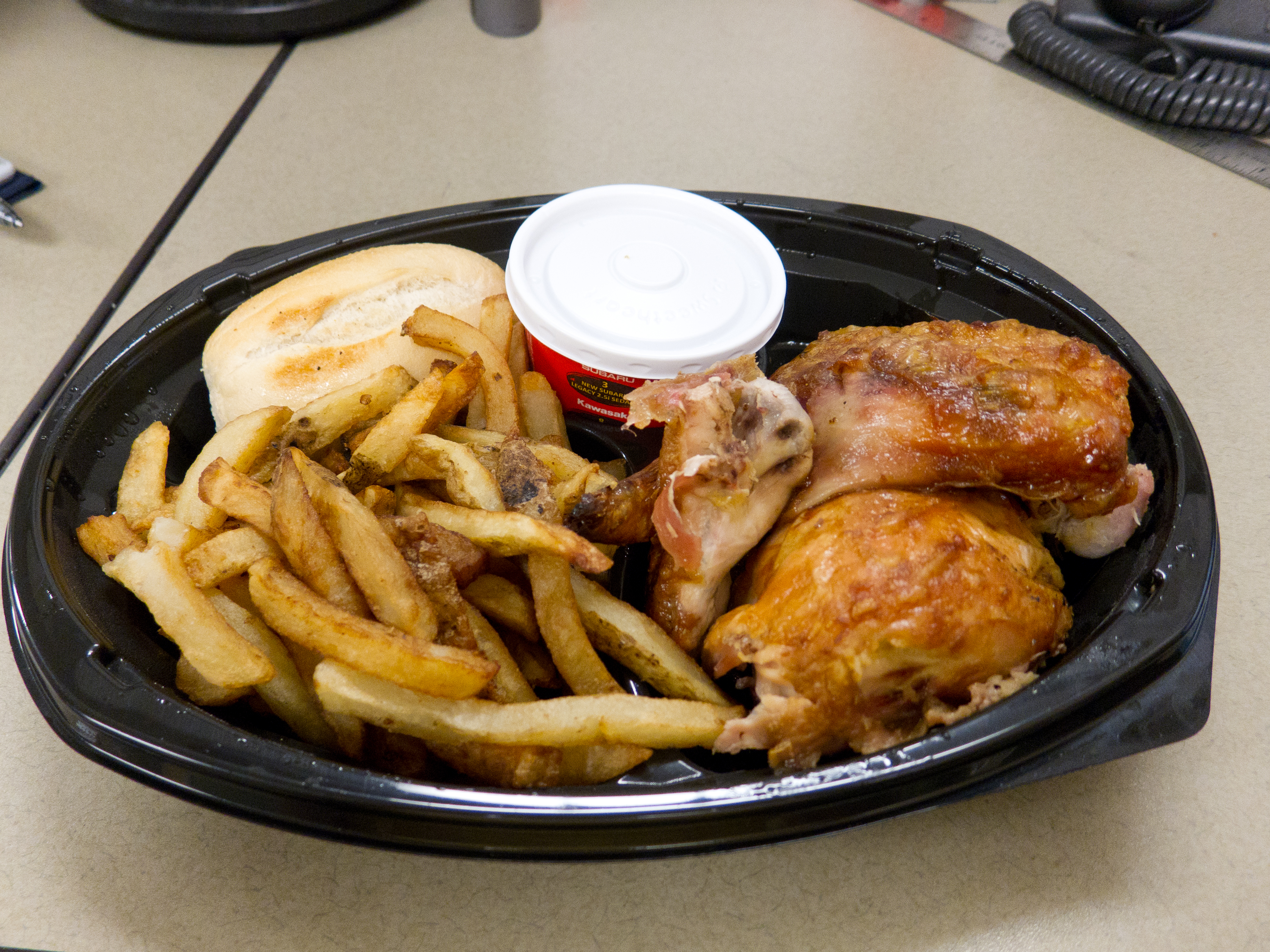
Take-out version of the Half Chicken Dinner

Restaurant fare is based upon its signature item, rotisserie chicken. The Quarter Chicken Dinner, the restaurant's signature dish, includes a roasted chicken leg or breast with "Chalet Sauce", a bread roll and a side dish. Swiss Chalet's most popular side dish is Chalet fries. Chalet fries were changed in 2015 and again in 2020, to mixed reviews.

== See also ==
- Chicken restaurant
- List of Canadian restaurant chains
- List of chicken restaurants
- St-Hubert – a similar Quebec-based chain, owned by Recipe Unlimited since 2016
