= Ricky Neckles =

Grenadian-born Canadian entrepreneur (born 1985)

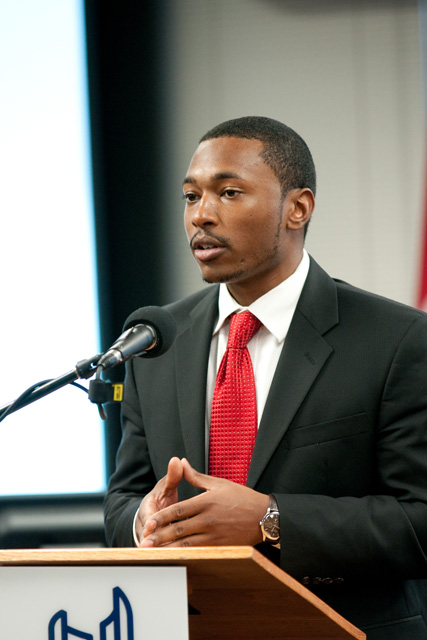
- Ricky Neckles speaking at Press Conference - Toronto City Hall
- Born: 1985 (age 40–41); Grenada
- Education: B.S. mechanical engineering
- Alma mater: University of Toronto
- Occupations: Entrepreneur, mechanical engineer
- Organization: Neckles Global Enterprise Inc.
- Known for: Founder of Neckles Global Enterprise Inc., Certified Ace, and Co-Founder TNTech Canada

Ricky Neckles is a Grenadian-born Canadian entrepreneur. He is the founder of Neckles Global Enterprise Inc. and co-founder of TNTech Canada.

He is a mechanical engineer that has served as Chapter President for the University of Toronto National Society of Black Engineers (NSBE), with a membership of 33,000. In 2014, Neckles was recognized by Metro News as a Torontonian Making a Difference in Canada with Certified Ace.

He is also affiliated with organizations including INROADS Alumni Association, University of Toronto Engineering Alumni Association, Black Business Professional Association, University of Toronto Black Alumni Association, Canadian Youth Business Foundation, and Big Brothers Big Sisters of Canada. Additionally, Neckles is also a guest lecturer with appearances at the Youth Gang Prevention/Intervention Program Graduation and United Black Students Conference in 2011.

== Early life and education ==
Neckles was born in Grenada and immigrated to Toronto with his mother. He grew up in the at risk community of Mount Dennis in Toronto.

Neckles graduated from the University of Toronto with a Bachelor of Science degree in mechanical engineering. He was an intern at Nortel Networks with the role business development analyst.

== Career ==
Neckles’ business career started at Accenture, a global management consulting, technology services and outsourcing company, where he was one of the youngest recruits and the youngest to be appointed to the position of management consultant analyst. His client portfolio included companies such as Sears and Loblaws.

Neckles left his job with Accenture after one year to become an entrepreneur at the age of 24. He started his first company, TNTech Canada, a leading supplier and distributor of on-site paging services in Canada.

In 2008, Neckles founded Neckles Global Enterprise Inc. (NGE), a privately held investment company which owns a collection of diversified businesses operating in sectors that include real estate, trade and manufacturing and includes TNTech Canada. TNTech has helped maximize the efficiency and communication for clients including Jack Astor's, The Keg Steakhouse, Baton Rouge (restaurant) and Shoppers Drug Mart. Neckles also founded Certified Ace Inc., a company that facilitates the hiring and completion of services across 90 categories through the use of small businesses in Canada, the United States and Australia.

== Other activities ==
Neckles founded the Youth Legacy Program to encourage youth to pursue education in science, technology, engineering and math by exposing youth to fields they normally would not have access to. The Youth Legacy Program also promotes and develops academic, technical, and leadership skills for students in primary and secondary schools. In 2012, he was a panelist at the recent UFSC, Urban Financial Services Coalition-Toronto Chapter International Conference where the focus was on building role models in diverse communities.
