= Wild Wing =

Wild Wing may refer to:

- Wild Wing Restaurants, a Canadian restaurant chain
- Wild Wing Cafe, an American restaurant chain
- Wild Wing (mascot), the mascot of the Anaheim Ducks

== See also ==
- Wild Wings, a 1966 short film
- Wild Wings State Wildlife Management Area, Minnesota, United States
