= Mikes (restaurant) =

Canadian pasta & pizza restaurant chain

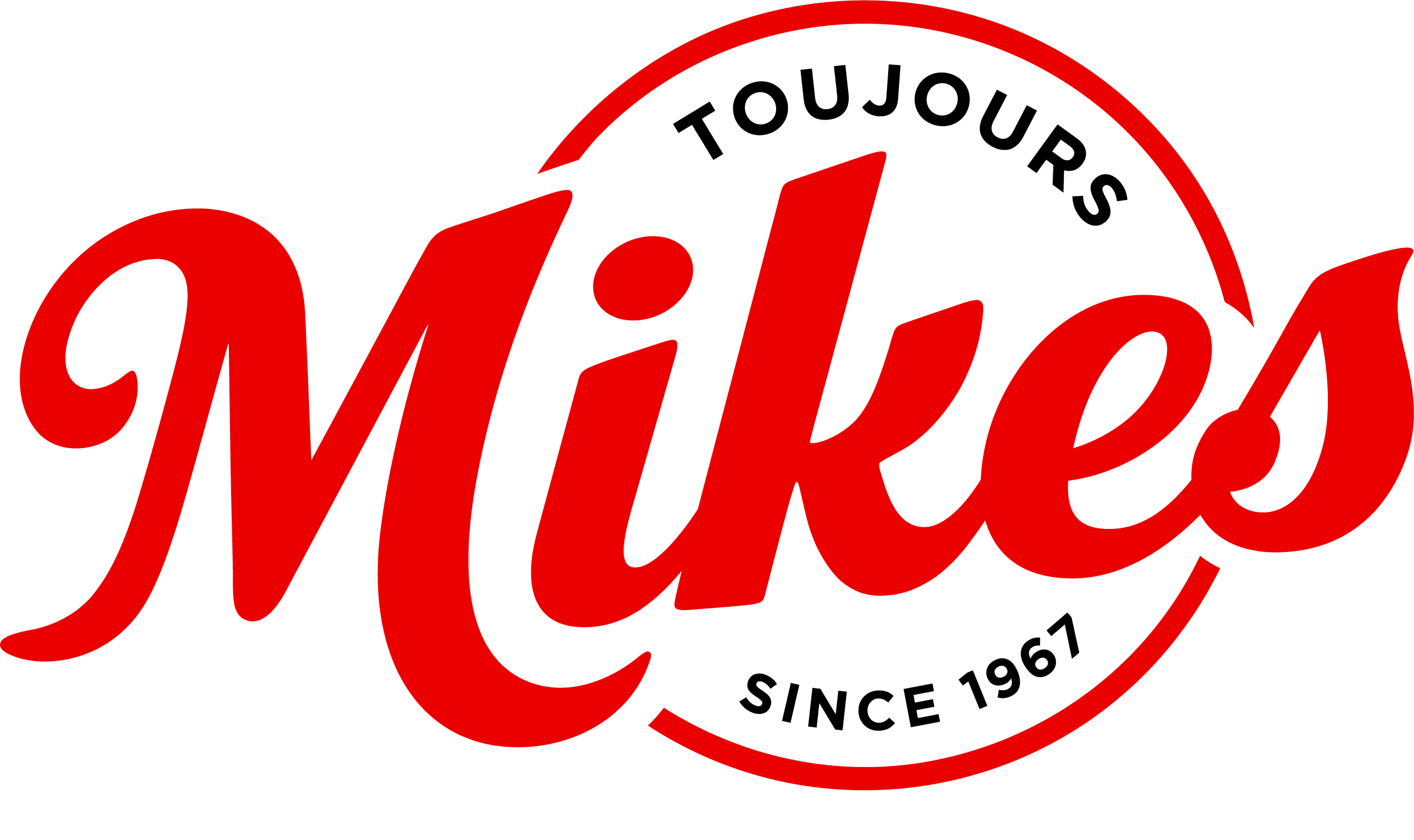
- Company type: Subsidiary
- Industry: Casual dining restaurant
- Founded: 1967; 59 years ago
- Headquarters: Montreal, Quebec
- Number of locations: 70
- Products: Pizza, Pasta, Submarines
- Parent: Imvescor Restaurant Group Inc.
- Website: www.mikes.ca

Mikes, referred to as Toujours Mikes in the current logo, is a chain of restaurants that originated in Montreal, Quebec, Canada, with 70 restaurants in Eastern Canada, mostly in Quebec. The restaurant chain is owned by Imvescor Restaurant Group, based in Montreal, Quebec, which also owns Pizza Delight, Baton Rouge and Scores.

== History ==
Mikes was founded in 1967 in Montreal, by the Marano brothers, as a sandwich shop. Since then, their menu has added pizza, pasta, other meals and some desserts. In 2016, in anticipation of its then upcoming 50th anniversary, the company debuted a new logo featuring a new slogan: "TOUJOURS MIKES" ("ALWAYS MIKES").

== Gallery ==
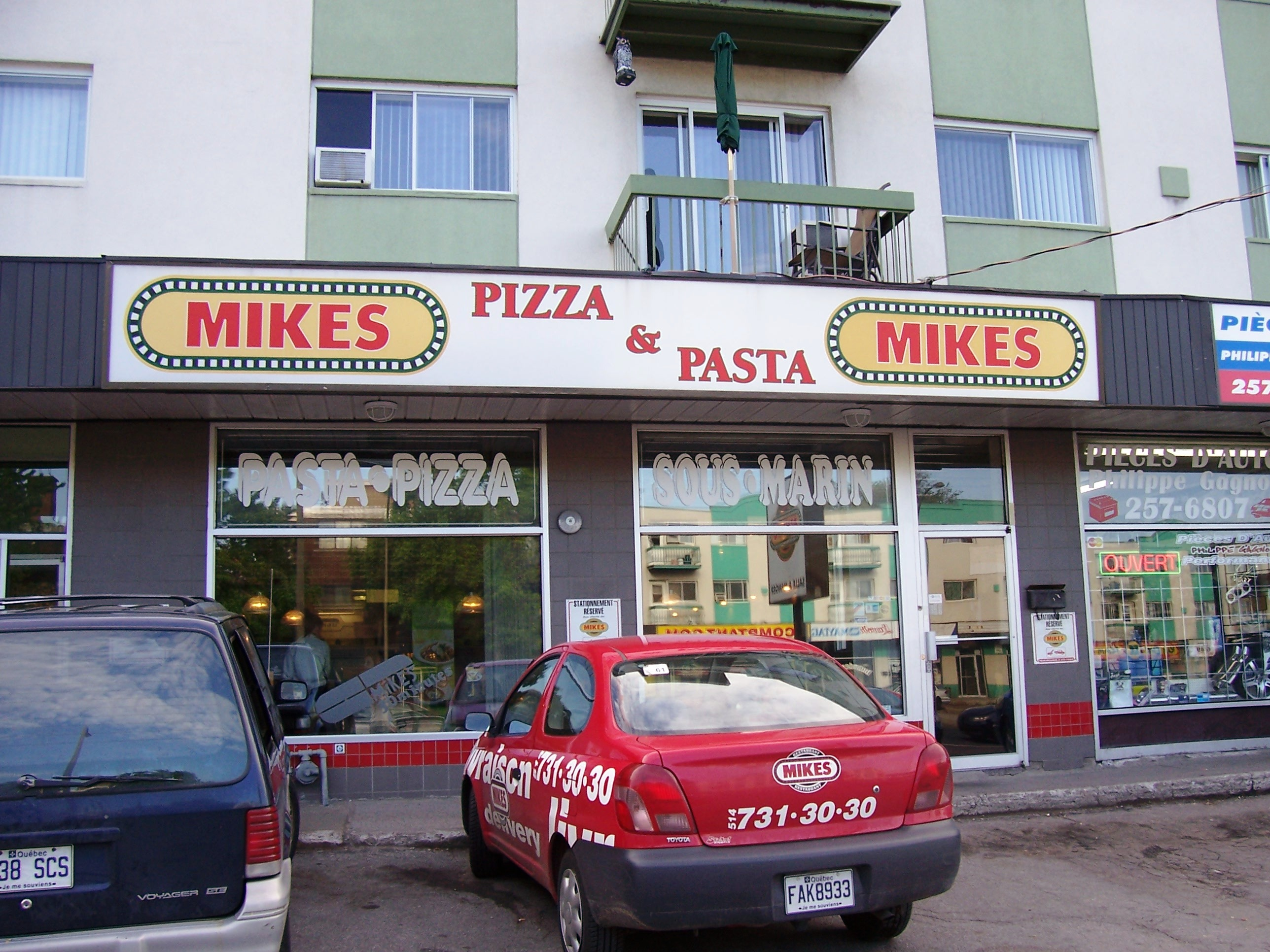
An urban Mikes location with previous logo

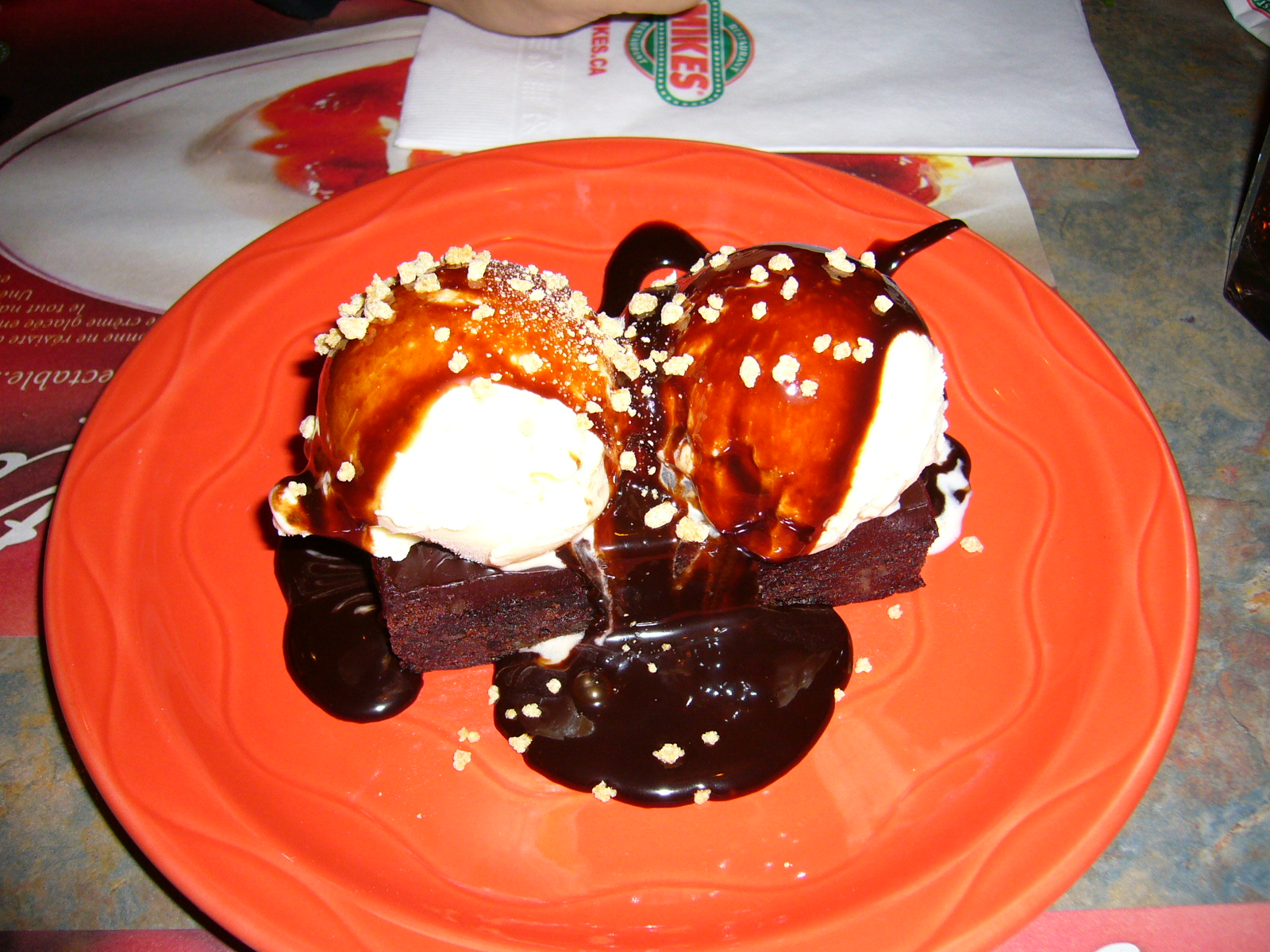
A Mikes-style brownie, with ice cream and heated chocolate sauce

== See also ==
- List of Canadian restaurant chains
