= Mother's Pizza Parlour and Spaghetti House =

Multinational restaurant chain

Mother's Pizza
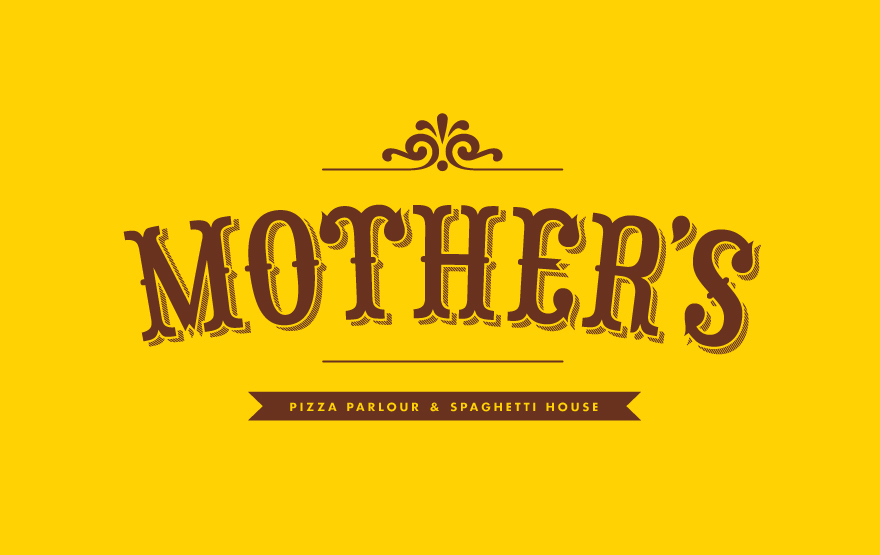

Restaurant information
- Established: 1970; 56 years ago (originally); April 1, 2013; 13 years ago (reestablished)
- Location: Canada
- Website: mothersrestaurants.com

Mother's Pizza Parlour and Spaghetti House, or simply Mother's Pizza, was a restaurant revival of a major 1970s and 1980s chain of the same name, which grew to 120 locations in Canada, the United States, and the United Kingdom.

The restaurant is remembered for parlour-style pizza, big mugs, root beer floats, and nostalgic decor, such as Tiffany lamps.

Along with pizza, the reestablished location included pasta and salads.

== History ==
Grey Sisson, Ken Fowler and Pasquale Marra partnered to found Mother's in 1970, opening their first restaurant at Westdale, a residential neighbourhood in Hamilton, Ontario, the same year. Just a month later, the Hamilton Spectator′s Gourmet Guide named it as one of the ten best restaurants in the city.

As of 1976, an advertisement for the new Windsor, Ontario location cited 17 locations, in Barrie, Brantford, Burlington, Cambridge, Hamilton, Kingston, Kitchener, London, Oakville, Oshawa, Peterborough, Waterloo, and Windsor. They served pizzas, spaghetti, and submarine sandwiches, and a variety of other items, including spumoni ice cream. No frozen food was used in preparation, spumoni and lasagna excepted. Promotions included Wednesday night NoodleNight, A 1928 Model A Ford was converted into the Mother's Pie Wagon, which participated in parades, fairs, and festivals across Ontario.

Fifteen corporate Mother's restaurants were purchased in 1987, with Bayswater Partnership as the primary investor. Bayswater included Toronto Blue Jays catcher Ernie Whitt and three partners, who paid $9.8 million for the locations, deemed under performing as they didn't have active, hands-on owners. Lloyd Moseby and batting coach Cito Gaston were persuaded to become limited partners in the chain. Whitt was to become a spokesperson and appear at charity fundraising events. The chain frequently ran "Ernie Whitt Specials" on pizza deliveries. Television commercials featured such international celebrities as Dennis Weaver.

The company went into receivership, and was purchased by the Little Caesars pizza chain in 1989. Within a few years, locations began closing, including Westdale in 1992.

Co-founder Grey Sisson is now chair of the Service Inspired Restaurants board, which owns Jack Astor's, Scaddabush (formerly Alice Fazooli's) and Canyon Creek; the group is based out of the same South Service Road building that Mother's was, in Burlington, Ontario.

Their flare glasses are considered drinking glass collectibles.

== Reestablishment (2013-ca. 2019) ==
The chain is now owned by Brian Alger and Geeve Sandhu, who both fondly remember the original chain. Alger bought the Mother's and The Pop Shoppe trademarks, reestablishing the latter in 2004 and waiting until 2011 to reestablish Mother's. Sandhu joined as operational partner in 2010. Sandhu previously worked for Jack Astor's, and owned three pubs as of 2013.

Many of the old franchisees have helped the new location; one of the former franchisees is working to perfect the original dough recipe.

The new restaurant retains some classic features, but with a more contemporary feel. Their aim was to replicate what the restaurant would have been like, if it had never left the marketplace. Retained are pitchers of pop, red and white fabric on seats, Tiffany glass panels, and projected black and white films, and newly introduced are old barn beams, and stone walls and distressed oak. Removed are elements including tables made of sewing machines, flashing marquee signs, and swinging parlour-style doors.

Alger suggested that he wanted the old uniforms to return, but realized in might not be popular with employees. The new uniforms make reference to the old.

The first location was intentionally in Hamilton, given that it hosted the original location of the first chain. Before opening the first location, the partners were scouting for a second.

The first relaunched Mother's Pizza location opened April 1, 2013, at 701 Queenston Road in Hamilton, Ontario.

The second Mother's Pizza location opened on May 5, 2014, in Kitchener, Ontario, at 4391 King Street East.

A third Mother's Pizza location opened in Spring 2015 in Brantford, Ontario, at 185 King George Road.

A fourth Location opened in fall 2016 in Waterloo, Ontario, at 183 Weber Street North.

The Hamilton location closed in September 2017. The Brantford location closed in April 2018. The Waterloo location closed in May 2018, and by the end of January 2019, the last location in Kitchener had also closed.
