= List of Canadian restaurant chains =

Although many of the largest restaurant chains in Canada are US-based (such as McDonald's and Yum! Brands among others), some Canadian-based (owned and operated from Canada) restaurant chains are growing and have expanded into other markets, especially into the US.

== Major chains ==
=== 241 Pizza ===
241 Pizza was founded in Toronto in 1986. Since then, 241 Pizza has expanded across Ontario, and has locations in Newfoundland and Labrador and Saskatchewan.

=== A&W (Canada) ===
A&W Restaurants entered the Canadian market in 1956. In 1972, the American company sold the Canadian unit to Unilever thus creating A&W (Canada). In 1995, it was spun off into an independent entity with no ties to its American counterpart. They have over 800 locations nationwide.

=== Bâton Rouge Steakhouse & Bar (restaurant) ===
Founded in Laval, Québec Bâton Rouge is a steakhouse and bar owned by MTY Food Group Inc., with most of their locations found in Québec and the Greater Toronto Area.

=== BeaverTails/Queues de Castor ===
BeaverTails pastry (or Queues de Castor pâtisserie in Quebec) is a chain of pastry stands operated by BeaverTails Canada Inc. The chain's namesake product is a line of fried dough pastries, individually hand-stretched to resemble a beaver's tail. The chain began in Ottawa and now has franchises and licensees in six countries: Canada (Atlantic Canada, Ontario, Alberta, Manitoba, British Columbia and Quebec), the United States, Japan, France, U.A.E., and Mexico.

=== Ben & Florentine ===
Ben & Florentine is a Canadian breakfast and lunch restaurant chain, serving around 2.5 million customers per year. The founders used characteristics from their own families to create the concept of the chain. Each Ben & Florentine restaurant is owned individually as a franchise. Ben & Florentine was founded in 2008 in Saint-Laurent, Quebec and the first restaurant opened in Vaudreuil-Dorion, Quebec. By 2011, it had 16 locations in the province of Quebec. The chain has been a CFA member since 2010. The restaurant chain began by serving an extensive breakfast and lunch menu, and later extended hours to include dinner selections. In 2012 the chain expanded into Ontario, and by 2014 there were 31 locations. In 2015, the chain had 43 franchise units.

=== Big Smoke Burger ===
Big Smoke Burger is a chain of burger restaurants founded by Mustafa Yusuf in Toronto in 2007 with 17 locations across North America and the Middle East.

=== Booster Juice ===
Booster Juice is a smoothie/juice bar founded in Sherwood Park, Alberta, just east of Edmonton. Booster Juice Headquarters is located in Edmonton, Alberta. Initially found in Western Canada, over time, Booster Juice has expanded internationally with over 500 locations worldwide as of 2022. Most of the Booster Juice locations are primarily found in shopping malls.

=== Boston Pizza ===
Boston Pizza (branded as Boston's Restaurant & Sports Bar outside of Canada) has franchised 396 restaurants in North America. Boston Pizza International Inc. was Canada's number one casual dining brand with more than 340 restaurants in Canada and system-wide sales of $831 million in 2008. Annually, Boston Pizza serves more than 40 million guests. The first Boston Pizza location was opened in Edmonton, Alberta in 1964 by Gus Agioritis under the name "Boston Pizza and Spaghetti House". It took 32 years to open its first 100 locations, and eight years for the next 100. The current owners of the restaurant chain, Jim Treliving and George Melville, purchased the company in 1983, 15 years after Treliving bought his first franchise, and 10 years after he first partnered with Melville. Store sales growth has averaged 6.3% for the last decade compared to the industry average of 2.2%.

=== Boustan ===
Boustan is a chain of Lebanese-Canadian restaurants started in Montreal in 1986.

=== Burgers n' Fries Forever ===
Burgers n' Fries Forever is a beef and chicken burger chain founded by Jamil Bhuya and Evan Ostrander in Ottawa in 2013 with 14 locations across Southern Ontario.

=== The Burger's Priest ===
The Burger's Priest is a beef/chicken burger and hotdog chain founded by Shant Mardirosian in 2010 in Toronto, Ontario, acquired by Recipe Unlimited in 2017, with 25 locations across Southern Ontario.

=== Cactus Club Cafe ===
Cactus Club Cafe is a chain of premium casual restaurants founded by Richard Jaffray and Scott Morison in Vancouver in 1988. Currently 31 restaurants are operated across Canada.

As of 2022 "After 34 years, Richard Jaffray stepped aside as an owner and executive of Cactus Club Cafe, the restaurant chain he co-founded. The Fuller family, who have been silent partners since the company began, will become full owners."

The Fuller family also owns Earls, Joey's, Cactus Club and Saltlik Steakhouse.

=== Chairman's Brands ===
Chairman's Brands is a privately held corporation dedicated to the franchising, development, and marketing of quick-service restaurants. Until 2006, its main operation was Coffee Time with operations in Canada, Greece, Poland, China, Qatar and Saudi Arabia. The chain's first store was opened in 1982 by Tom Michalopoulos in Bolton, Ontario. In October 2006, the company doubled in size, when it purchased the Afton Food Group, a company whose assets included Robin's Donuts, 241 Pizza and Mrs. Powell's Cinnamon Buns. The company also operates Eggsmart, and The Friendly Greek. In all, Chairman's Brands operates more than 500 stores across Canada under its seven brands.

As of November 15, 2016, they operated eight brands with over 440 locations in five countries. The brands were 241 Pizza, Coffee Time, Eggsmart, Mia Fresco, New Orleans Pizza, Robin's, and The Friendly Greek.

=== Chez Ashton ===
Chez Ashton is a regional fast food restaurant in Quebec that is famous for its poutine. Chez Ashton was started as a travelling snack cart by Ashton Leblond in 1969. In 1972, poutine was first offered. Leblond hooked his customers by giving free samples of his poutine. The enterprise grew in popularity until Leblond was able to open a restaurant with a dining room open year-round in 1976. The franchise has grown to include 25 restaurants in the Quebec City region.

=== Coffee Time ===
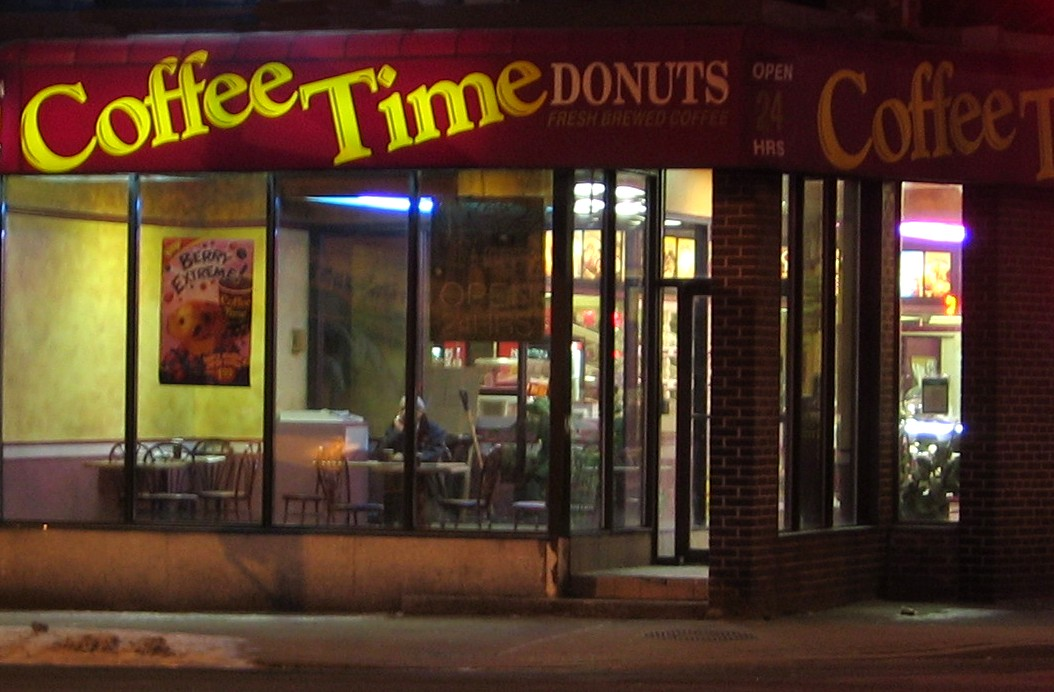
A Coffee Time restaurant in Bloordale Village, Toronto

Coffee Time is a chain of coffee & donut shops headquartered in Bolton, Ontario with 30 locations across Southern Ontario.

=== Coffee Culture Café & Eatery ===
Coffee Culture Café & Eatery is a chain selling coffee, pastries and sandwiches founded in Mississauga, Ontario in 2006 with some self-branded products debuted in 1998 with 45 locations in Ontario and Manitoba

=== Cora Breakfast & Lunch ===
Cora, based in Montreal, has 128 restaurants and was started by Cora Tsouflidou in 1987. It can be found in every Canadian province (but PEI). In 2008, the restaurant changed its name from Cora's breakfast and lunch (in French, Chez Cora déjeuners) to Cora. Serving such breakfast items as eggs, crepes and French toast, it is known for its all day breakfast and heaping mounds of fruit.

=== Crabby Joe's Bar • Grill ===
Crabby Joe's is a restaurant and bar chain founded in 1996 with 15 Ontario locations and headquarters in Mississauga. "Obsidian Group Inc." has made the decision to swap some of their Crabby Joe's restaurants to "Chuck's Roadhouse". In 2025, the chain had 15 locations across southern Ontario.

=== Country Style ===
Country Style is a chain of coffee stores operating primarily in the province of Ontario. They have 420 estimated locations in Canada. Country Style was purchased by MTY Food Group Inc. With their headquarters located in Richmond Hill, Ontario.

=== Cows Ice Cream ===
Cows is a chain of ice cream parlours and cheesemongers with nine locations in Canada and one in the United States. It started in 1983 in Prince Edward Island as an ice cream parlour. Today it is known for its 32 varieties of ice cream, cheddar cheese, and cow-themed merchandise. Sales of Cows ice cream spiked in the summer of 2010, after American television hosts Regis and Kelly showed interest in the chain.

=== La Diperie ===
La Diperie is an ice cream chain created in 2014 in Montreal by Sam Arif. In 2016, MTY Food Group acquired 60% of the ice cream chain.

=== Dixie Lee Fried Chicken ===
Dixie Lee Fried Chicken is a fried chicken restaurant that has 39 locations in 3 different Canadian provinces.

=== Druxy's ===
Druxy's is a chain of Canadian fast-food sandwich shops.

=== East Side Mario's ===
East Side Mario's is an Italian restaurant chain, with headquarters located in Mississauga, Ontario. It has 61 locations as of 2025, most of which are located in Ontario.

=== Edo Japan ===
Based in Calgary, Alberta, Edo Japan is a quick-service restaurant that primarily sells Japanese food.

=== Eggsquis ===
Eggsquis is a midscale chain of restaurants in Quebec and Ontario. As of 2018, there are 39 outlets, which are primarily in Quebec. It specializes in egg dishes, from bacon and eggs to omelettes. The first Eggsquis restaurant was opened by Elias Stergiou in Sherbrooke, in 1995. In 2010, the owners of the restaurant chain Chez Cora took Eggsquis to court, claiming that some of the dishes at its Mascouche location had been copied from Cora's, including the names of the dishes.

=== Freshii ===
Freshii is a quick service restaurant that has about 100 locations all over Canada and 15+ other countries.

=== Gladiator Burger & Steak ===
Gladiator Burger & Steak was founded in 2018 by Ali Ibrahim and Zeena Yahia in Mississauga, Ontario with six locations in Southern Ontario.

=== Grinner's Food Systems Limited ===
Grinners Food Systems Limited, the franchiser of Greco Pizza (since 1981) and Captain Sub, is a Truro, Nova Scotia-based company. It is owned by Trucorp Investments Incorporated. Trucorp, headquartered in Dieppe, New Brunswick, also owns Bonte Foods Limited, Frank and Gino's Restaurants, and Chris Brothers food products.

Established in Moncton, New Brunswick in 1977, Greco Pizza is one of Atlantic Canada's largest pizza chains. Menu items include pizza, donair, salads, garlic fingers, and the restaurant's proprietary dipping sauces. Many of the over 170 locations in Quebec, Ontario, New Brunswick, Nova Scotia, and Newfoundland operate co-branded with Captain Submarine. Both are quick-service restaurants.

Captain Submarine was acquired by Grinner's in 2002, when it only had nine locations (21 fewer than it had in the 1980s). Many of the stores franchised since then also sell Greco Pizza items. The purchase brought the number of Grinners franchised restaurants from 111 to 120.

=== Harvey's ===
Harvey's is a quick service restaurant where customers are invited to choose their own toppings, founded in 1959 by George B. Sukornyk and Rick Mauran.

=== Hero Certified Burgers ===
Hero Certified Burgers is a quick service restaurant franchise chain that operates in Canada, with locations concentrated in Southern Ontario. The chain was founded in 2004 by John Lettieri, who opened the first store in Hazelton Lanes in Yorkville, Toronto, Ontario. Lettieri also owns the restaurant chain Lettieri café, based in Toronto. The company was the first Canadian franchise to focus on the provision of fast foods using food products from vendors that adhere to sustainable practices.

=== Imvescor Restaurants Inc ===
Imvescor was the parent company of the restaurant chains Scores, Pizza Delight, Mikes, Baton Rouge with a history that goes back to 1968. It was known as Pizza Delight Corporation until 2007, when the name was changed to Imvescor. As Pizza Delight Corporation, the company purchased Mikes in 2000 for $14.5 million, Quebec company Scores Rotisserie Barbecue and Ribs in 2005 for $32 million and Baton Rouge Restaurants. Headquartered in Moncton, the company was in charge of 259 restaurants across Canada (101 Pizza Delight, 91 Mikes, 39 Scores, and 28 Baton Rouge).

Imvescor used to be a privately owned corporation that held the licence for the trademark and intellectual property of the four restaurants by PDM Royalties Income Fund. In 2009, the income fund and Imvescor combined their businesses into a new corporation called Imvescor Restaurant Group Inc. The four restaurant chains employed over 10,000 people. Total system sales in 2009 were $324.8 million. Imvescor is now owned by MTY Food Group, after being acquired in December 2017.

=== Kelseys Original Roadhouse ===
Formerly "Kelsey's Neighbourhood Bar & Grill" is a sit-in Roadhouse known best for their chuck burgers. Kelseys subsidiary is Montana's BBQ & Bar.

=== Kinton Ramen ===
Kinton Ramen is a Japanese-style ramen chain specializing in Japanese noodle soup. Their first location was on Baldwin Street in Toronto, which opened in 2012. They eventually leveraged a franchise model to multiply their locations to 38 by April 2024, with locations in central Ontario, Quebec, British Columbia, Illinois and New York state.

=== Lazeez Shawarma ===
Lazeez Shawarma is a quick-service restaurant chain known for its Mediterranean and Middle Eastern-centric menu. Founded in Mississauga in 2013 by Sahib Singh Rana and Nada Nasri with 65 locations.

=== Lone Star Texas Grill ===
Following Val Belcher's retirement from professional football, Belcher began a successful career as a restaurant entrepreneur. In 1986, Belcher founded the Lone Star Cafe restaurant with former Ottawa Rough Rider teammate Larry Brune in the Ottawa suburb of Nepean. Over the years, it expanded into a franchise business. It was renamed Lone Star Texas Grill, operating under the Lone Star Group of Companies. As of 2020, Lone Star Texas Grill operates over 20 locations across southern and eastern Ontario, including seven in the Greater Ottawa Area where it originated, as a family-style restaurant specializing in wood-fire grill fajitas, authentic Tex-Mex fare and frozen margaritas.

=== Mary Brown's ===
Mary Brown's operated mainly in Newfoundland (about 20 locations with 2 locations in Halifax and 1 in Ontario) until the late 1970s, when it began expanding in Ontario, Alberta and Nova Scotia. In 2010, there were 38 locations in Newfoundland and Labrador, 30 locations in Ontario, 12 in Alberta and 3 in Nova Scotia, for an approximate total of 83. As of 2017, Mary Brown's has expanded into the United States, specifically in Florida. Drive-through and delivery services are available at some locations.

The restaurant chain, started by Newfoundlanders Pat Tarrant and Cyril Fleming in 1969, was named after Mary Brown, the wife of a fried chicken recipe creator. The headquarters are in Markham, Ontario.

=== Mr. Mike's ===
Mr. Mike's SteakhouseCasual is a chain of restaurants in Western Canada. It began as a steakhouse where the most popular item on the menu was the Mikeburger, which consisted of grilled steak served on a fresh French loaf with garlic butter and the secret Mike Sauce. It has since evolved to a casual dining arrangement with a "West Coast feel". Mr. Mike's now features a broad menu and full liquor licence, and targets a different demographic. Their first restaurant in Eastern Canada opened in Welland Ontario on November 21, 2017.

=== MTY Food Group ===
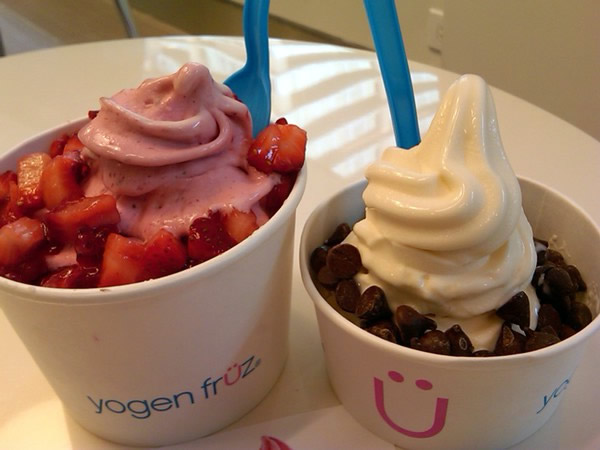
Yogen Fruz part of MTY Food Group

MTY Food Group is the parent company of 28 different franchising brands including Yogen Fruz Canada (operates locations as master franchisee), Mucho Burrito, Mr. Sub, Tiki Ming, Mrs. Vanelli's, Taco Time, Country Style, Thai Express, and Tandori. Founded by Stanley Ma, originally from Hong Kong, in 1979 when he opened his first restaurant Le Paradis du Pacifique in Montreal; the company incorporated in 1984 and joined the Toronto Stock Exchange in 2010. Most of the company's growth has come through acquisitions, but MTY has also launched at least 10 of the franchises. The 25-year-old company oversees 2251 (up from 1741 in 2010) quick service restaurants (excluding Mr. Sub locations, about 35 of MTY's locations are corporately run). Its latest acquisitions are Jugo Juice and Groupe Valentine. System-wide sales increased 17.5% in 2010 while the number of locations rose by 57, or 10%.

=== New York Fries ===
New York Fries is a mall-based quick service restaurant chain known for their poutine and hotdogs.

=== Osmow's ===
Osmow's is a quick-service restaurant chain known for its Mediterranean and Middle Eastern-centric menu. Founded in Mississauga in 2001, the chain now has 200 locations across North America.

=== Panago ===
Panago (originally Panagopoulos) is a privately owned quick service pizza chain with 174 franchised locations in Canada, 151 of which are in British Columbia and Alberta. It is headquartered in Abbotsford, British Columbia, where in 1986 the first three stores opened.

In recent years it has attempted to make its food healthier as provincial healthier eating guidelines became more strict. Offerings include multigrain crusts, salads, 33 pizza toppings, and other menu items that have no trans fat, MSG, artificial flavours or artificial colours.

=== Pizza Nova ===
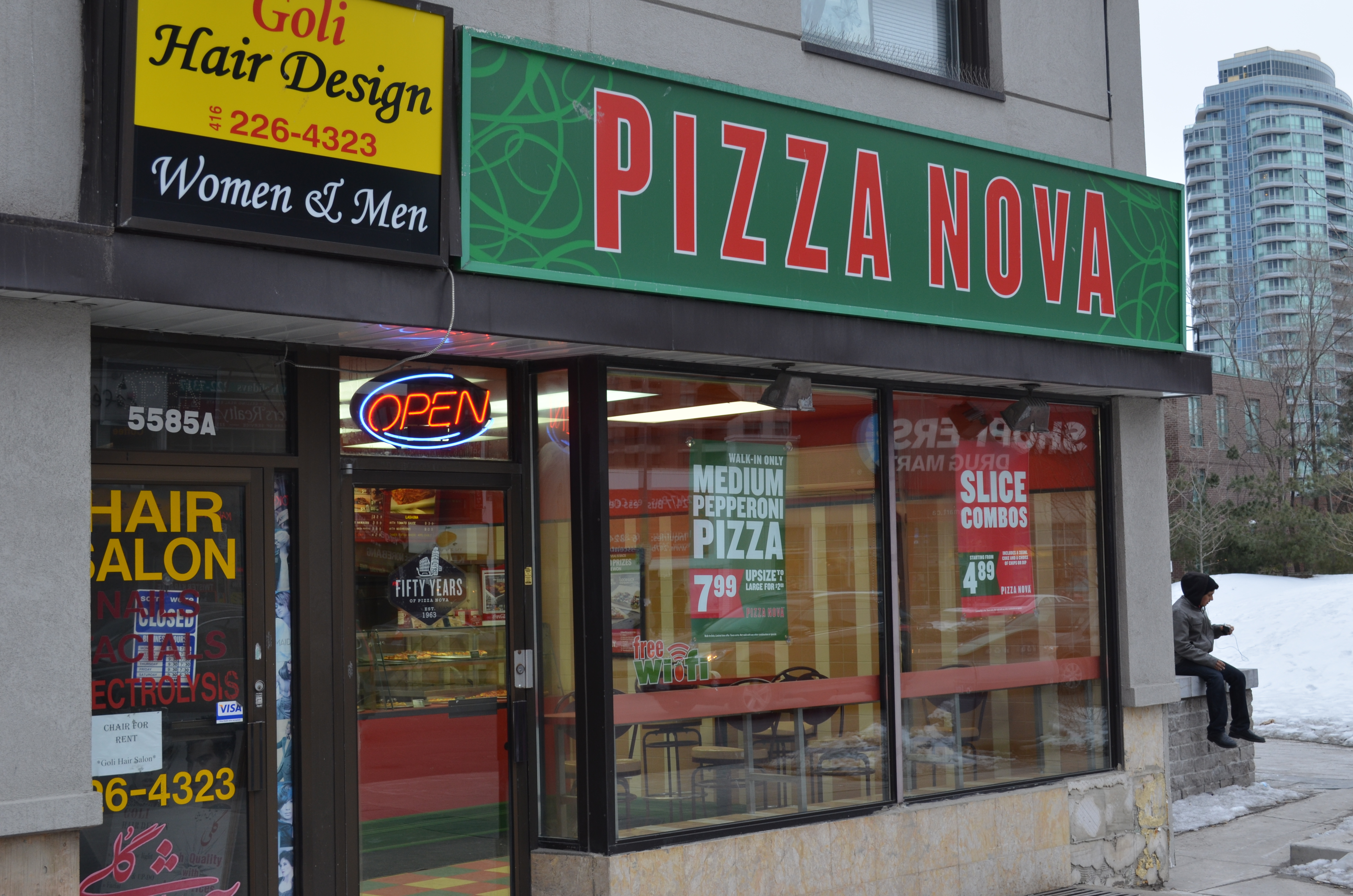
Pizza Nova on Yonge Street

Pizza Nova is a primarily Ontario-based pizza chain founded in 1963 by Sam Primucci with more than 150 restaurants.

=== Pizza Pizza ===
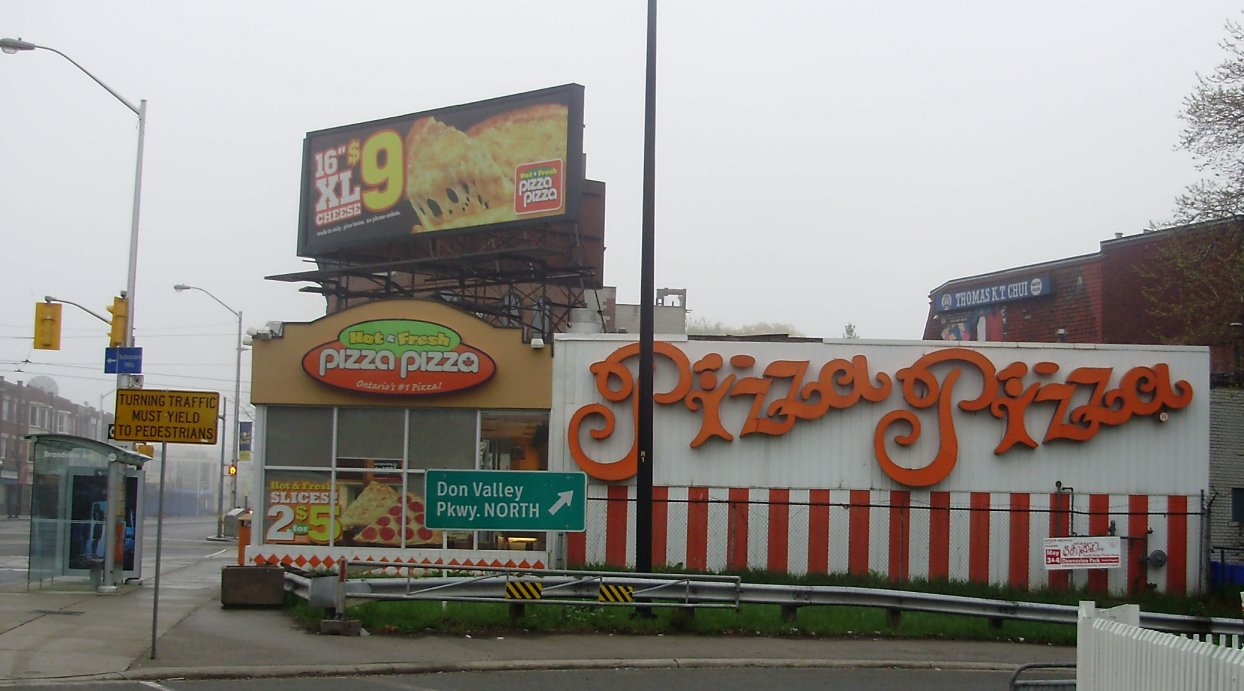
Pizza Pizza location in Toronto

Pizza Pizza is a primarily Ontario-based pizza chain founded in 1967 by Michael Overs with more than 700 traditional and non-traditional restaurants coast to coast with over 3,000 employees. Its sister brand is western chain, Pizza 73. Pizza Pizza fills approximately 29 million orders annually and has won a Webby for their iPhone App.

=== Pür & Simple ===
Pür & Simple is a Canadian chain of restaurants specializing in breakfast and lunch. Founded in 2016, the brand is operated under the Eat It! Brands portfolio.

=== Recipe Unlimited ===
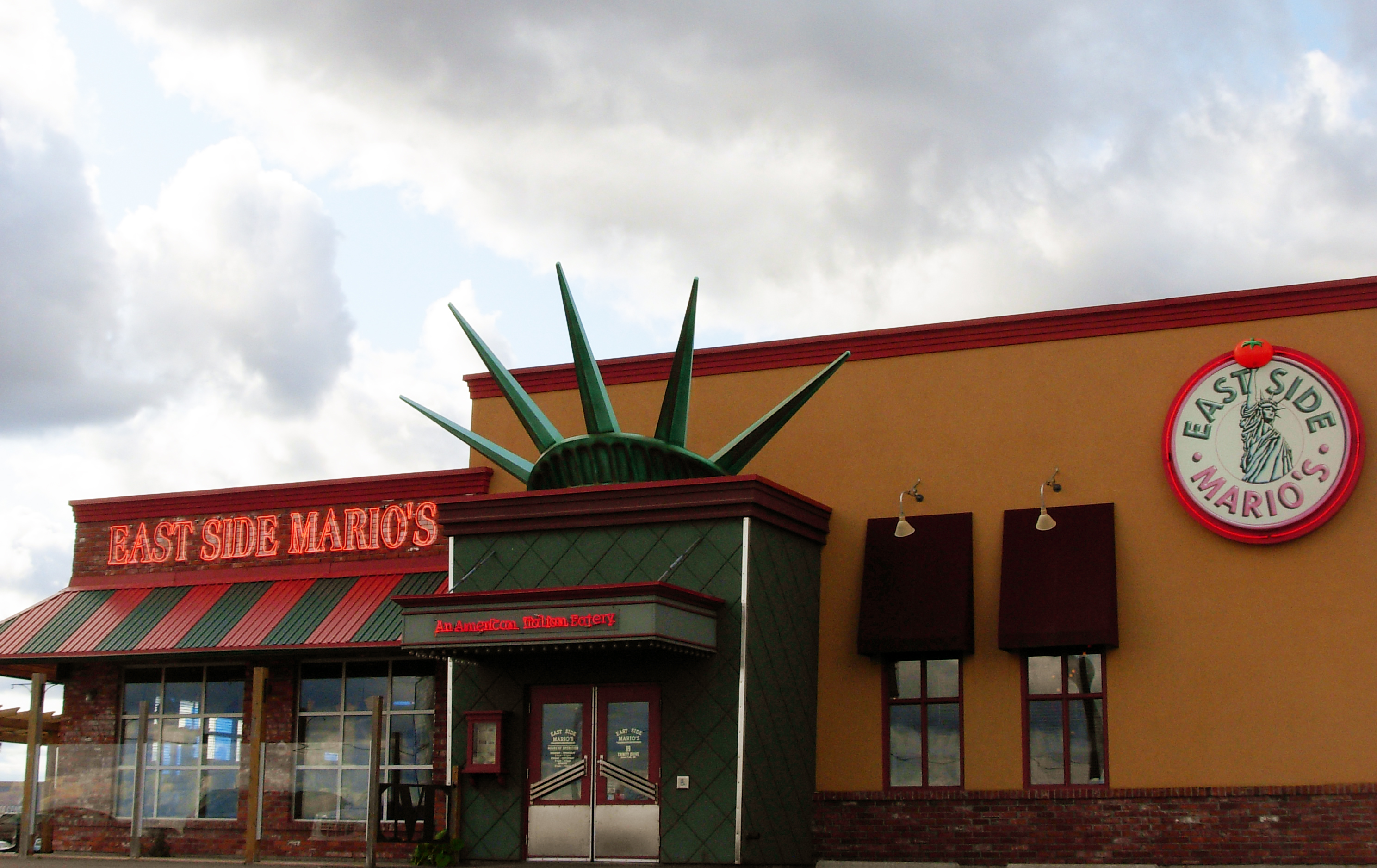
East Side Mario's in Moncton

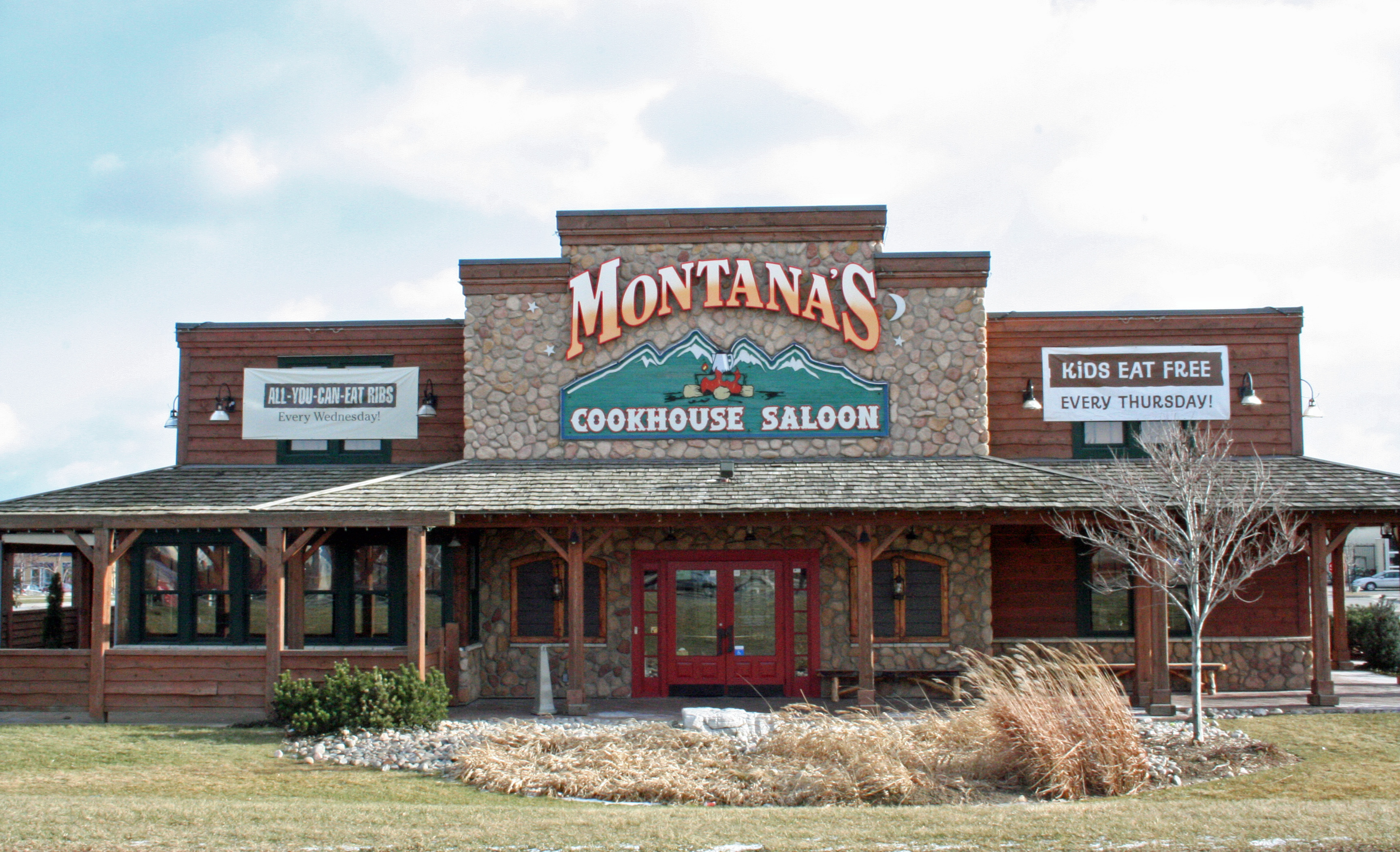
Montana's Cookhouse

Recipe Unlimited (previously known as Cara Operations) operates Harvey's, Swiss Chalet, Montana's Cookhouse, Kelsey's Neighbourhood Bar & Grill and other brands. The company also provides catering services to airlines. The revenue for its 1200 restaurants and its airline solutions division in 2008 was over $2 billion.

Cara Airline Solutions operated about 10 flight kitchens across Canada that served more than 50 air carriers and rail travel customers, it was sold to Gategroup in 2010.

Montana's Cookhouse started in 1995, was acquired by Cara in 2002, and operates 90 restaurants across Canada.

There are 200 Swiss Chalet restaurants in Canada and the US.

New York Fries is another Recipe Unlimited brand with about 200 stores in Canada, Hong Kong, UAE, Kuwait, and South Korea. New York Fries also had a burger company called South St. Burger, that sells burgers along with New York Fries and other products. It was spun off into a separate entity as part of the Cara acquisition.

The largest Canadian-established hamburger chain in the nation, Harvey's was founded in Richmond Hill, Ontario, in 1959, it has franchises from Vancouver to St. John's, though most its restaurants are concentrated in southern Ontario and southern Quebec.

On March 31, 2016, Cara announced that it would acquire the St-Hubert chain of rotisserie chicken restaurants in the summer of 2016.

Recipe Unlimited also owns Prime Restaurants, the parent company of the restaurant chains East Side Mario's, Casey's, Pat and Mario's, Fionn MacCool's and Bier Markt Esplanade. Co-founded in Sudbury in 1980 by Bernard C. Dyer and Nicholas Perpick, the Mississauga-based company operates in Canada and the US. Prime Restaurants was acquired by Fairfax Financial, and many of their East Side Mario's locations have either closed or been converted to Prime Pubs. The Pat and Mario's restaurants have been closed.

=== Rosie's Burgers ===
Beef and chicken burger chain founded in 2020 in Port Credit, Mississauga, Ontario, acquired by Happy Belly Food Group Inc. in 2023, with 11 locations.

=== Shelby's Legendary Shawarma ===
Shelby's Legendary Shawarma is a shawarma fast food chain that has 52 locations, primarily in Greater Toronto Area, Ottawa, and southwestern Ontario as well as Alberta and the U.S. state Illinois, it is owned by Shelby's Franchise Holdings, Inc., is headquartered in Oakville, Ontario. Originating in 2015 when two Arab men from London, Ontario, Yazan El-Shalabi and Yasser Ali (also known by his public persona of "Shawarma Man") opened a food truck replacing a food trailer in nearby Lambeth originally catering to University of Western Ontario students, then opening its first brick-and-mortar location in 2018, with plans to expand into the United States and United Kingdom.

This restaurant serves shawarma wraps, rice bowls, poutines, maneesh and churros. It has a social media presence on YouTube, TikTok, Instagram, X (Twitter) and Facebook.

=== Smoke's Poutinerie ===
A poutine chain founded in 2008 in Toronto by Ryan Smolkin with multiple locations in Canada.

=== St. Louis Bar & Grill ===
Founded in Toronto in 1992, St. Louis Bar & Grill is a Canadian restaurant chain known for their chicken wings and casual dining. The company has expanded to more than 80 locations across Canada and is known for its signature wings, garlic dill sauce, and sports-bar atmosphere. In 2022, the chain was acquired by Aegis Brands.

=== St-Hubert ===
Laval, Quebec-based St-Hubert operates 97 restaurants in Canada, making it the 16th largest restaurant chain in the country. It used to have many locations outside the province of Quebec, but withdrew to only in Quebec and Ottawa area. Swiss Chalet has taken advantage of that, growing into more locations, but has narrowed its presence in Quebec. Its unique brand of gravy is one of more than 600 products it sells through grocery stores in eastern Canada. It serves more than 31 million meals every year, including 3.2 million kilograms of cabbage, 6.062 million kilograms of French fries, and 8.3 million servings of desserts.

On March 31, 2016, Cara Operations announced that it would acquire the St-Hubert chain of rotisserie chicken restaurants in the summer of 2016.

=== Second Cup ===
Second Cup Coffee Co. is a Canadian specialty coffee retailer operating more than 345 cafes across the country. Its headquarters are in Mississauga, Ontario. Its stores sell hot and cold beverages, pastries, snacks, pre-packaged food items, hot and cold sandwiches, and drinkware, including mugs and tumblers. Second Cup sales continue to compete with Starbucks, Tim Hortons and McDonald's, which also feature espresso-based specialty drinks.

Since its inception, Second Cup has expanded its franchises to the United States, Morocco, Saudi Arabia, Bahrain, Kuwait, Oman, Qatar, Lebanon, Jordan, Egypt, the United Arab Emirates, Iraq, Syria, Yemen, Cyprus, Azerbaijan, Angola, Lithuania, and Romania. It also opened a store in Pakistan in 2013, in the United Kingdom in 2014, in the Philippines in 2015, and in Poland in 2016.

=== Smitty's Family Restaurants ===
Smitty's Family Restaurants opened their first location in 1960 and now operates 82 restaurants across Canada. Smitty's was one of the first ever franchise model restaurants in the country. Smitty's Restaurants are family owned and operated, and are known for their all day breakfast, lunch and dinner offerings. Their taglines of "All Your Favourites. All Day Long." and "Canada's Family Restaurant" are represented in a vast menu of choices for every age.

=== Sunset Grill ===
Sunset Grill is a breakfast restaurant based in Toronto, Ontario. They have 50+ locations .

=== Swiss Chalet ===
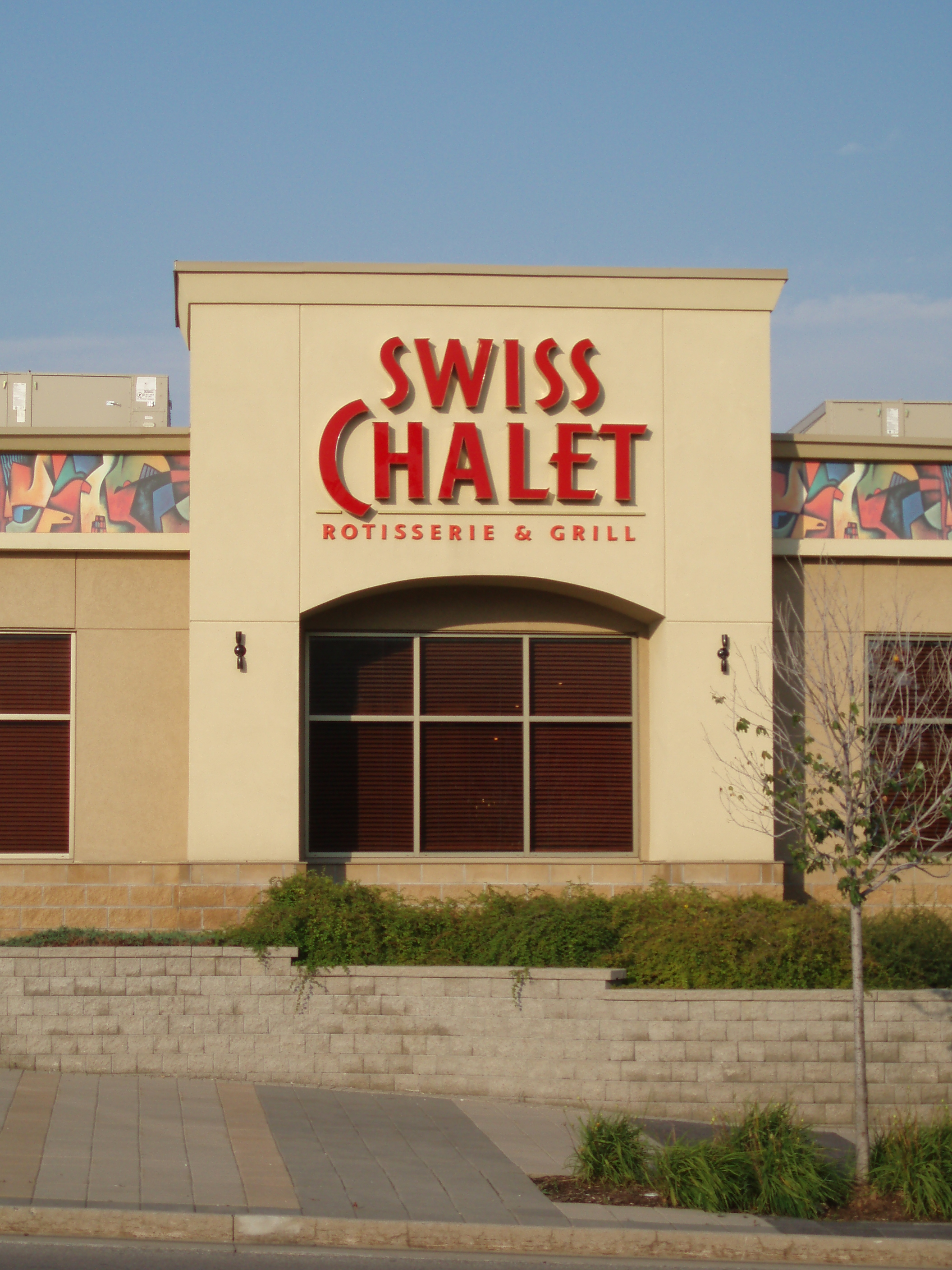
A Swiss Chalet restaurant in Markham, Ontario

Swiss Chalet is a Toronto-based restaurant chain known primarily for their rotisserie chicken. To date Swiss Chalet operates in every province but British Columbia, Saskatchewan and Quebec. Sometimes you can find a Swiss Chalet and Harvey's combo location.

=== Tahini's ===
Tahini's is a fast-casual Mediterranean and Middle Eastern fusion restaurant chain founded in London, Ontario, in 2012 by Omar Hamam. The chain is known for blending traditional shawarma with international cuisine, featuring items such as butter chicken shawarma, Jamaican jerk shawarma, and shawarma ramen. As of 2026, Tahini's operates over 70 locations across Canada and has begun expanding into international markets including the United States.

=== Thaï Express ===
Thaï Express is a Thai quick service restaurant chain that began in the province of Québec with 299 locations in Canada and internationally.

=== Tim Hortons ===
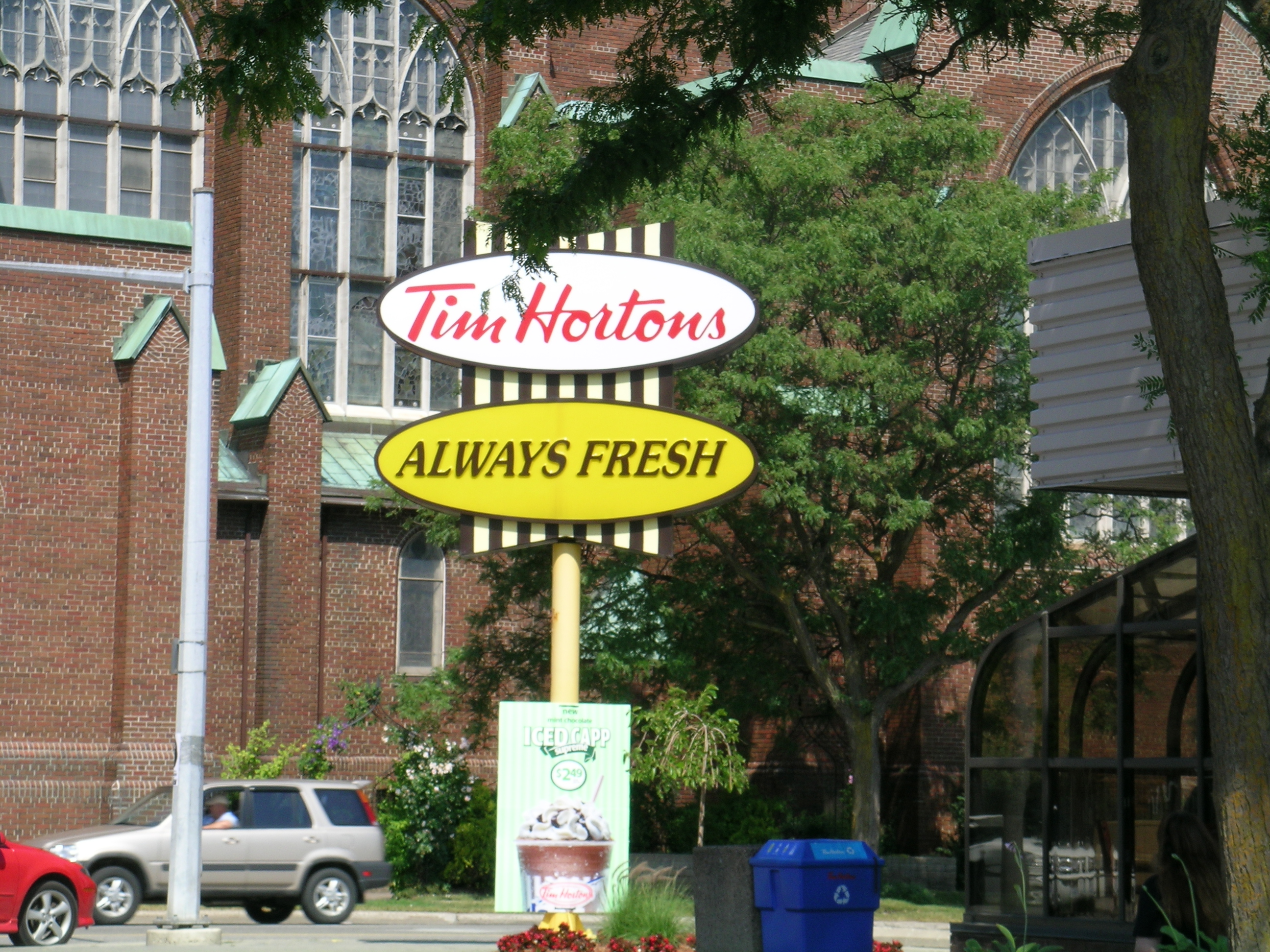
Tim Hortons in the suburban area of Stratford

Tim Hortons, currently owned by Restaurant Brands International, opened its first store on May 17, 1964, in Hamilton, Ontario. It is the fourth largest publicly traded quick-service restaurant chain in North America based on market capitalization, and the largest in Canada. It has cornered the Canadian market for baked goods (76%) and coffee (62% compared to Starbucks, in the number two position, at 7%). The company has experienced substantial growth in the United States, where it has 613 stores (April 2011, about 220 more than it had in June 2008). It has a same-store sales growth rate of 3.9% in Canada and 4.9% in the US. The new partnership with Cold Stone Creamery helped push its US presence to over 600 stores. The partnership has since dissolved. Sales exceeded $2 billion in 2008. It was controlled by Wendy's International Inc. for 11 of the 46 years of operation, from August 8, 1995, until the end of 2006. On April 3, 2011, Tim Hortons oversaw 3,782 locations in North America 3,169 of which were in Canada.

In the fourth quarter of 2010 Tim Hortons' profits were 27% more than they were over the entire 2009 fiscal year (for the quarter net income was up 314%).

In Forbes' 2011 edition of the world's 2000 largest companies, Tim Hortons placed 1469th overall (up from 1714th in 2010) with annual sales of $2.6 billion (up from $2.014 billion in 2010), profits totalling $628 million (up from $280 million), assets worth $2.5 billion (up from $1.90 billion) and a market value of $7.5 billion (up from $5.41 billion). The data is from the year ending January 2, and market value is from March 11, 2011.

In 2014, the chain was purchased by a foreign company, Brazilian firm 3G Capital, known for its ownership of Burger King. Despite foreign ownership, Tim Hortons remains a Canadian cultural phenomenon.

=== The Pint Group ===
Edmonton hospitality group that owns 7 restaurant brands in Western Canada, Toronto, and Halifax. Banners include The Pint (5 locations), Beercade, Smoke BBQ + BAR, Employees Only, Hey Bud, Crash Hotel, and Arena Liquor store.

=== Tut's Egyptian Street Food ===
Tut's is a Canadian fast-casual restaurant chain that specializes in Egyptian street food, particularly sandwiches. The business was established in August 2020 with a flagship location in Downtown Toronto and has since expanded to multiple locations across Ontario. Tut's menu features modern adaptations of traditional Egyptian recipes, presented in a quick-service format.

=== Wild Wing ===
Wild Wing is a wing sports bar based in King City, Ontario. Wild Wing has 96 locations throughout Canada, with plans to introduce a new concept "Wild Wing Roadhouse" in Chatham, Ontario in 2024.

=== Wimpy's Diner ===
Wimpy's Diner is a chain of '50s & '60s -themed family dining restaurants chain with 51 locations across Canada.

=== White Spot ===
From British Columbia White Spot is a full service restaurant that is known for their hamburgers and Triple O sauce. Also has quick service restaurants called Triple O's.

== See also ==
- Lists of restaurants
- List of fast-food chains in Canada
- List of restaurant chains in the United States
