= Pizza Delight =

Canadian pizza restaurant chain

Coordinates: 46°05′18″N 64°46′39″W

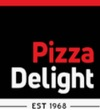
- Company type: Subsidiary
- Industry: Restaurant
- Founded: Shediac, New Brunswick (1968; 58 years ago)
- Headquarters: 264 Botsford Street; Suite 201; Moncton, New Brunswick; E1C 4X7
- Key people: Bernard Imbeault (FCEO)
- Products: Pizza, Pasta
- Number of employees: 3,500+
- Parent: MTY Food Group
- Website: www.pizzadelight.com

Pizza Delight is a Canadian pizza restaurant franchise. It was founded in 1968 in Shediac, New Brunswick by Léandre Bourque and Allard Robichaud and then purchased by Bernard Imbeault and two of his friends a year later. The chain's head offices are now located in Moncton. The restaurant primarily serves pizza, pasta and salad dishes. It has over 70 restaurants, and operates in Ontario and the Atlantic provinces, with almost half of its locations in New Brunswick.

== Imvescor ==
In 2000, Pizza Delight purchased Mikes, a prominent chain in Quebec and Ontario, for $15 million. Further acquisitions followed; the company acquired Scores in 2005, and Bâton Rouge in 2006. In 2006, it changed its name to Imvescor, to reflect its larger stable of restaurants. At its peak, the company owned and operated over 350 restaurants across Canada under four different banners. These included:

- 95 Pizza Delights
- 94 Mikes Restaurants
- 28 Bâton Rouge Restaurants
- 40 Scores Restaurants

In December 2017, MTY Food Group acquired Imvescor (including Pizza Delight) for $248 million.

== See also ==
- List of Canadian restaurant chains
