= Wimpy's Diner =

Canadian chain of 51 restaurants in southern Ontario

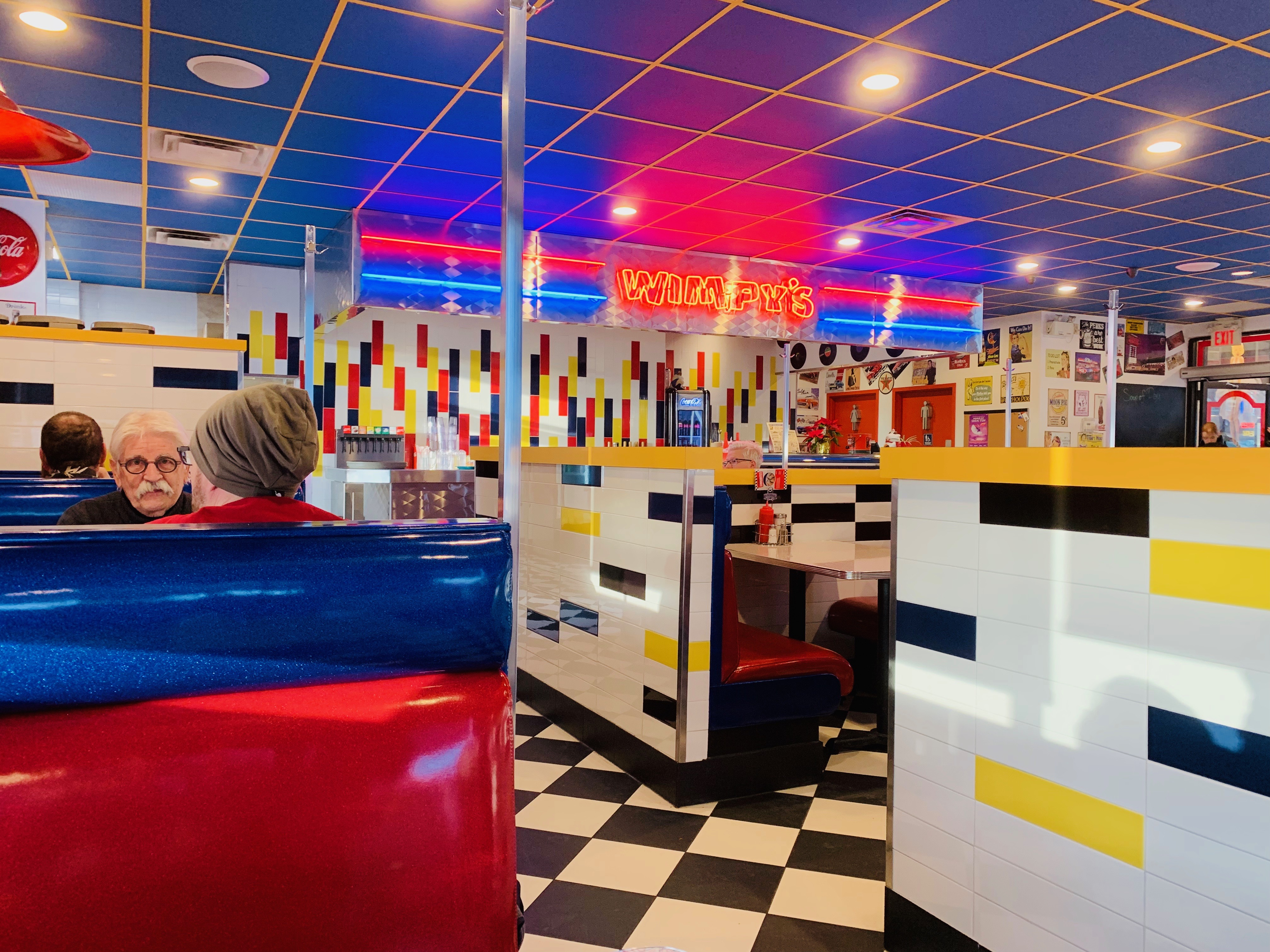
A Wimpy's Diner in London, Ontario.

Wimpy's Diner is a Canadian chain of 51 restaurants in southern Ontario based on the 1950s- and 1960s-themed diners serving hamburgers, but also serving breakfast all day along with various lunches and dinners and specialty poutines. Wimpy's was established in 1961 as "Wimpy's Drive-In" in Toronto (Wimpy's Charcoal House at Finch Avenue West and Yonge Street). In 1988, it was turned into a full-service restaurant. A second location was opened in 1992. Locations are now found in Southern Ontario.

== See also ==
- List of Canadian restaurant chains
