= Cows Creamery =

Canadian ice cream manufacturer and retail chain

Cows
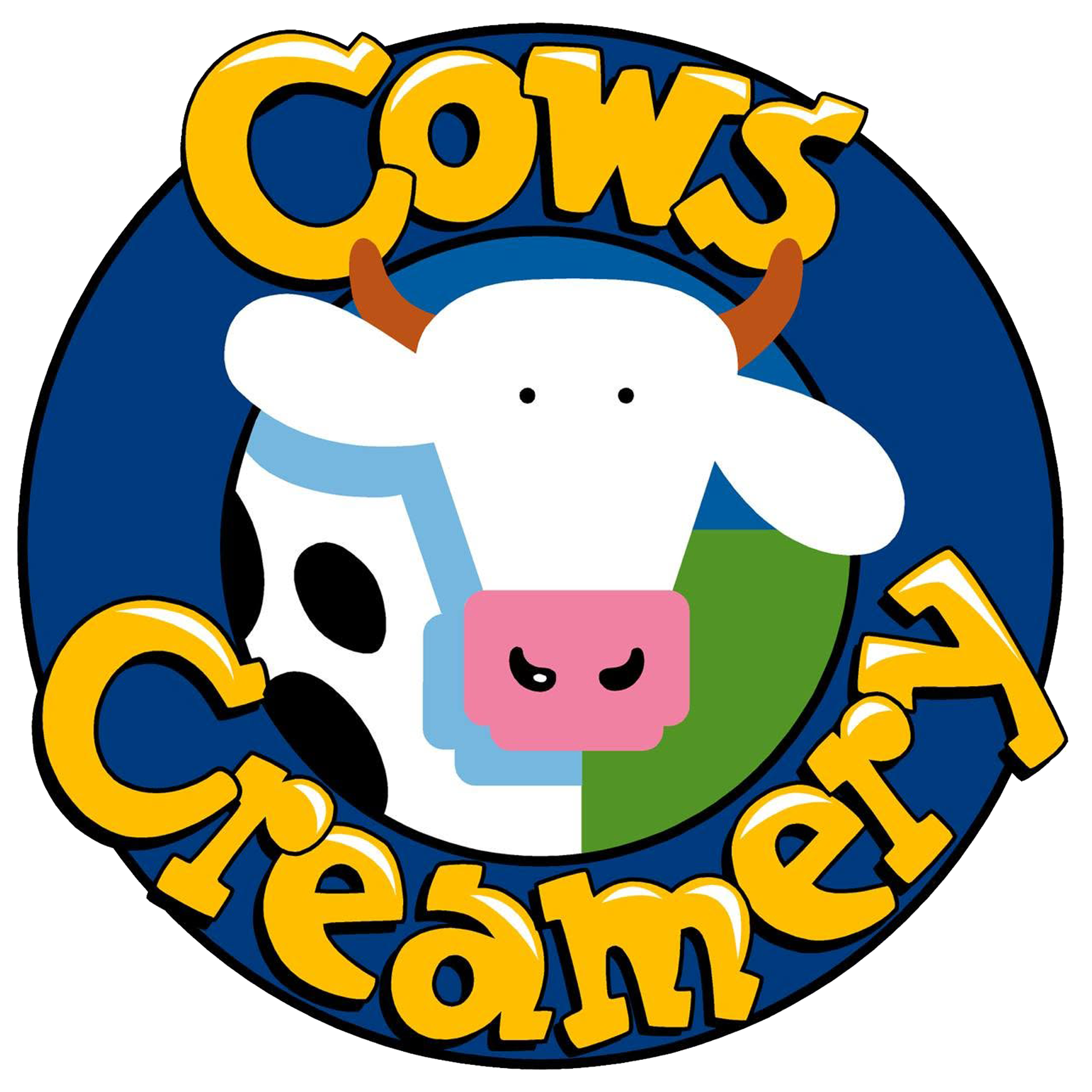
- Type: Private
- Industry: Ice cream
- Founded: Cavendish, Prince Edward Island, Canada, 1983; 43 years ago
- Headquarters: Charlottetown, Prince Edward Island, Canada
- Number of locations: 12
- Area served: Canada (various market)
- Key people: Scott Linkletter
- Products: Ice cream, cheese, merchandise
- Owner: Scott Linkletter
- Website: www.cows.ca

Cows is a Canadian ice cream manufacturer and chain of ice cream parlors based in Charlottetown, Prince Edward Island. Cows was founded in Cavendish, Prince Edward Island in 1983, and has since expanded into cheddar cheese, and cow-themed merchandise. Cows was named "Canada's best ice cream" in a survey of readers of Reader's Digest and named one of the world's top 10 places to get ice cream by Tauck World Discovery.

== History ==
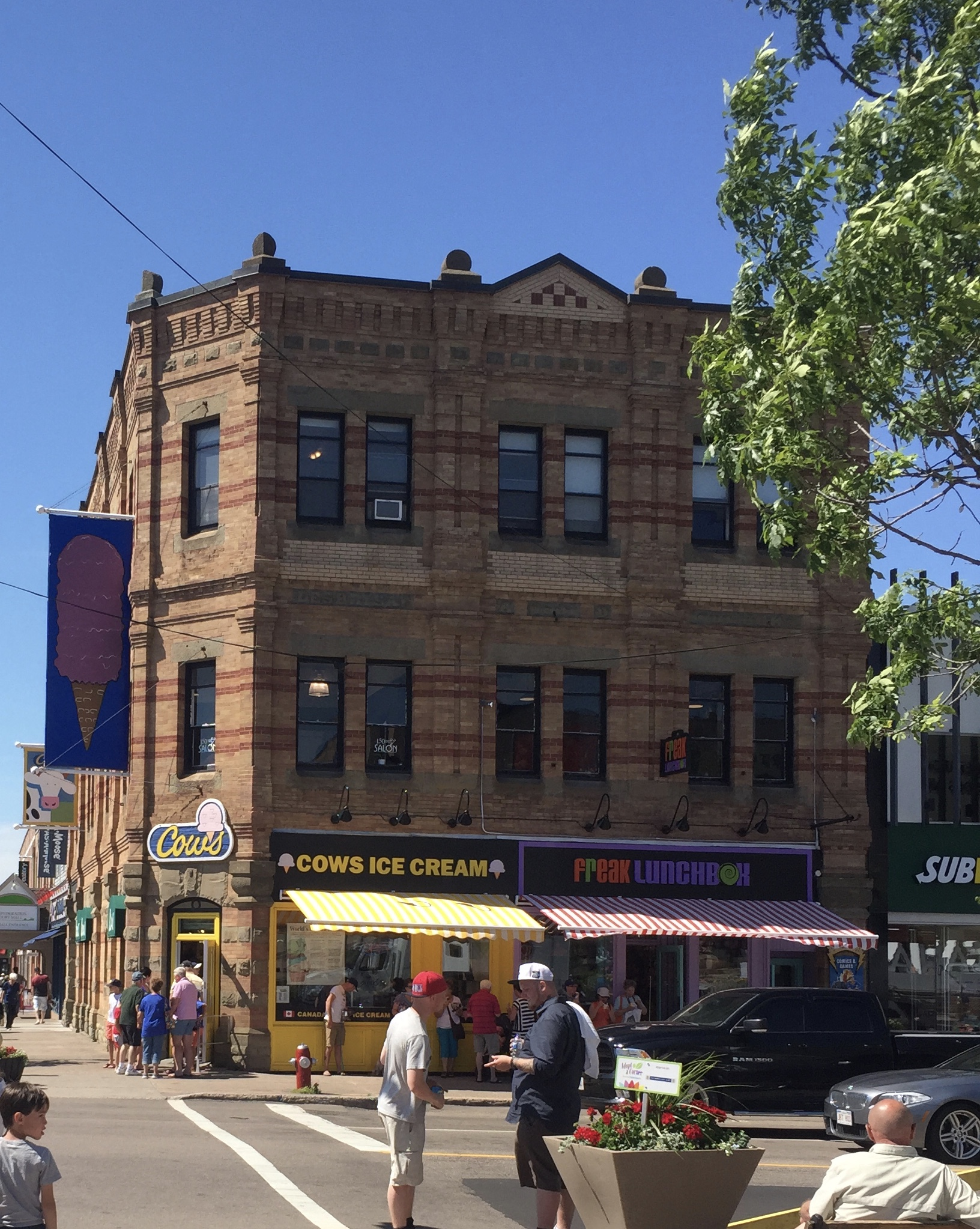
Cows Creamery in downtown Charlottetown, Prince Edward Island

The first Cows opened in Cavendish, Prince Edward Island in 1983. In 2006, Cows began producing cheese, including their principal product, Avonlea Clothbound Cheddar. Cows was voted as "Canada's best ice cream" in a Reader's Digest opinion poll, and in 2008 was listed as number 1 in the "World's Top Ten Places for Ice Cream" by Tauck World Discovery. Cows has 12 stores located across Canada (Prince Edward Island, Nova Scotia, British Columbia, Alberta, Québec and Ontario).

The original "Cows T-shirt" design was created by a PEI graphic artist, Marc Gallant in 1987. He went on creating several "whimsical cow themed designs" for 7 years until his death in 1994. Shortly after, Cows President Scott Linkletter hired Graphic Designer Shawn Mader to continue the line. From 1994 to present day, Shawn has created over 150 unique Cow designs, adorning everything from the Cows classic 100% cotton T-shirt to calendars, mugs, pens, etc.

In 2007, Cows announced that they would be building a new 25,000 square feet (2,300 m^{2}) corporate office in Charlottetown, paid for by a loan from the government of Prince Edward Island. The new Cows facility would be modeled after the Vermont-based Ben & Jerry's headquarters, and would serve as both a centralized production facility for all Cows ice cream and shirts. The new headquarters would also act as a tourist attraction where visitors can watch the ice cream and clothing being produced. In 2008, the plan for the facility had grown to 32,000 square feet (3,000 m^{2}); the design integrated a production area for cheese.

== Products ==
=== Cheese ===
In 2006, Cows expanded their brand to include cheddar cheese. The expansion came after Cows owner Scott Linkletter took a trip to the Orkney Islands in Northern Scotland. Linkletter was taken by the local cheese and partnered with a local cheese maker who would give him the recipe which would in turn be the foundation for Cows "signature cheese", Avonlea Clothbound Cheddar. While developing the recipe for Avonlea Clothbound Cheddar, Linkletter and Prince Edward Island cheese maker Armand Bernard created a second cheese, PEI Cheddar.

The company makes Avonlea Clothbound Cheddar in 10 kilograms (22 lb) wheels, and ages it for 12 months. Avonlea Clothbound Cheddar gets the "clothbound" name from the "traditional cheddar-making technique", of wrapping it in cheese cloth, a method that originated in Somerset, England (the town of Cheddar, where Cheddar cheese gets its name from is in the county of Somerset). The name Avonlea comes from link between Prince Edward Island and Anne of Green Gables. Avonlea Clothbound Cheddar won its category's second prize at the 2008 Chicago conference of the American Cheese Society.

=== Ice cream ===
Cows produce over 32 varieties of ice cream, with flavors such as "Gooey Mooey" and "Wowie Cowie".

== See also ==
- List of Canadian restaurant chains
