= Mr. Mike's =

Canadian restaurant chain

MR MIKES SteakhouseCasual
- Industry: Food service
- Founded: 1960; 66 years ago in Vancouver, British Columbia, Canada on Granville Street
- Founders: Bob and Nick Constabaris
- Headquarters: Burnaby, British Columbia, Canada
- Owners: Mr. Mikes Restaurant Corp.
- Website: mrmikes.ca

Mr Mikes SteakhouseCasual is a casual dining chain which operates across Canada. The brand is owned by Mr. Mikes Restaurants Corp., with its headquarters in Burnaby, British Columbia.

== History ==
=== Founding ===
Mr Mikes began with a single restaurant that opened in 1960 in Vancouver, British Columbia on Granville Street. Started by two brothers, Bob and Nick Constabaris, the restaurant aimed at providing a low cost dining experience for families. One aspect, somewhat unique at the time, was that the restaurant was self-serve. During the late 1960s, the brothers added a salad bar. The most popular item on the menu was the Mikeburger, which consisted of a burger patty served on a fresh French loaf with garlic butter and their Mike's sauce.

=== Growth ===
The restaurant was quite successful and a chain was created. In 1970, the 50th Mr Mikes Steakhouse franchise was opened, and during that year over 250,000 customers were served. By 1980, there were 69 Mr Mikes restaurants in operation. This was the peak of operations.

During the early 1980s, the economic downturn which particularly affected British Columbia forced the closing of several of the franchises. Still, by 1985, 49 restaurants were still in operation.

In 1995, Bill & Kelly Ranford partnered with Darren and Lindsey Flintoff to acquire the chain and turn the concept into a full-service West Coast-themed steakhouse without salad bars. There were 21 restaurants in the franchise system.

in 2006, FDC Brands, a company belonging to Canadian entrepreneur Yuri Fulmer acquired the entire Mr. Mikes Steakhouse and Bar chain, and rebranded it.

In 2011, RAMMP Hospitality Brands purchased the Mr Mikes franchise system.

In 2017, their expansion into Eastern Canada began. The first such location opened in Welland, Ontario on November 21.

=== Rebranding ===
RAMMP began work on rebranding the franchise and in the process, created a new dining category – Steakhouse Casual. The first flagship Steakhouse Casual location re-opened in Prince George, followed by Quesnel and Mission. New markets like Yorkton, Saskatchewan, and Bonnyville, Alberta also welcomed the new SteakhousCasual concept.

Mr Mikes SteakhouseCasual has evolved into a full-service restaurant and lounge that focuses on delivering a range of menu items. They offer two separate experiences under one roof – a food focus on the restaurant side and a lounge feel in their urbanLODGE. In addition to the Canada AAA steaks and Mikeburgers that the chain is known for, they also offer salads, pastas, and seafood dishes.

== Menu ==
While hamburgers and steaks are still popular items, the franchise no longer has a salad bar as of 2015.

== See also ==
- List of Canadian restaurant chains
