= Tom Michalopoulos =

Greek-born Canadian entrepreneur and businessman (1950–2021)

- Born: Anastasious Michalopoulos; January 22, 1950
- Died: April 21, 2021 (aged 71)
- Occupation: Businessman
- Known for: Founding Coffee Time

Anastasious "Tom" Michalopoulos (January 22, 1950 – April 21, 2021) was a Greek-born Canadian entrepreneur, businessman, president, and founder of Coffee Time. He was also the president of Chairman's Brands, the parent company to 241 Pizza, Coffee Time, Eggsmart, New Orleans Pizza, and the Friendly Greek.

Michalopoulos immigrated to Canada from Greece, and originally found employment as a real-estate agent before he started Coffee Time, a chain of coffee shops. In 1982, along with business partner Young Chang, he purchased a coffeehouse named Bentley's Fine Donuts in Bolton, Ontario, and renamed the company Coffee Time. He eventually franchised the company, at one point operated over 300 stores in Canada, and had franchises abroad in Greece, Qatar, and Afghanistan.

On the political field, he supported Tom Jakobek during the 2003 Toronto municipal election. He was also involved in developing soccer in Canada by founding and operating a club by the name of Toronto Olympians, which played in the Canadian Professional Soccer League in 1998. He sold the Olympians to David Gee, but still sponsored the league and team when it relocated to Mississauga, Ontario.

He died on April 21, 2021.
