= Hero Certified Burgers =

Hamburger restaurant chain in Ontario, Canada

- The Hero Certified Burgers logo

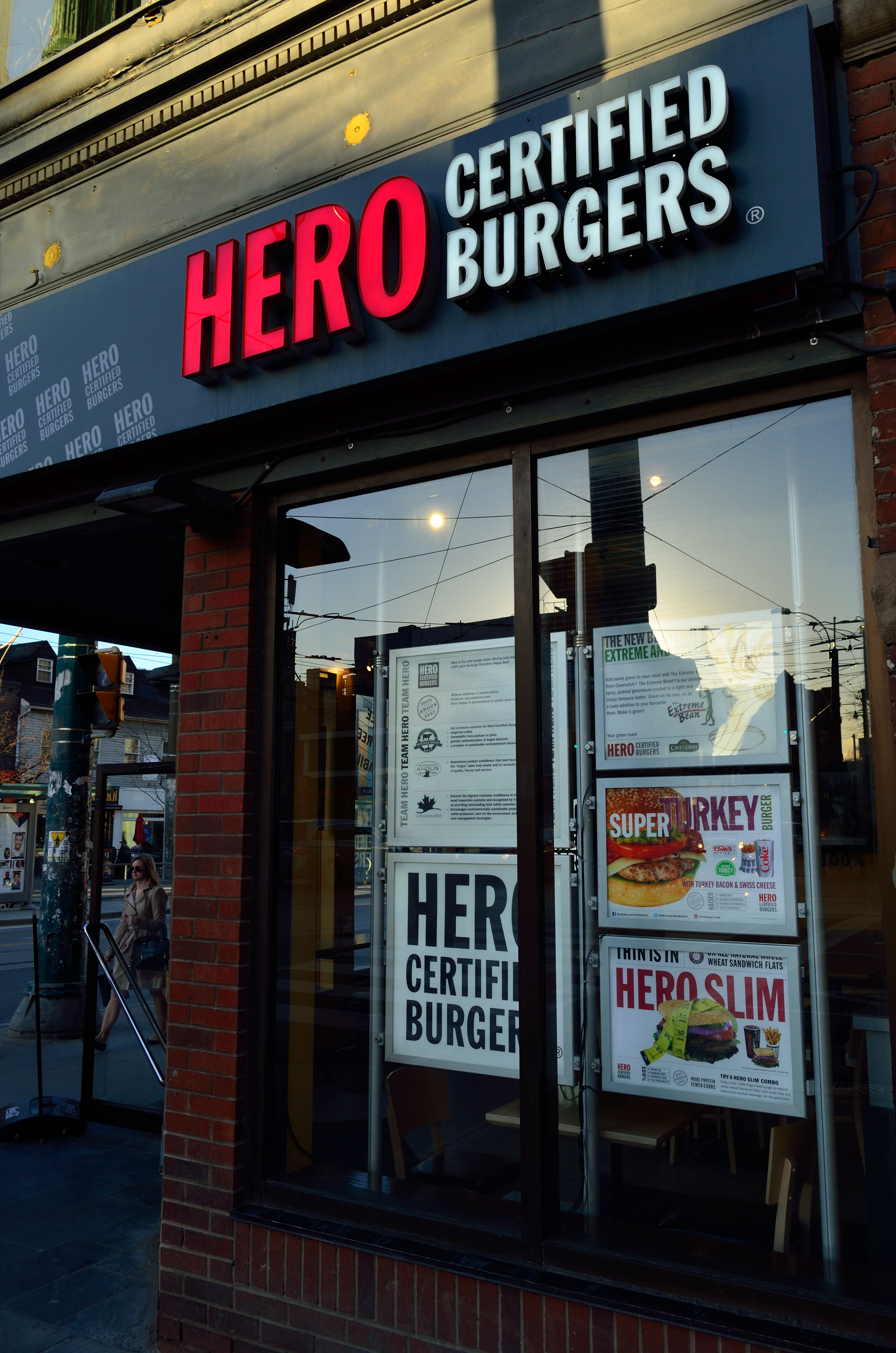
- A Hero Certified Burgers storefront in Toronto
- Industry: Restaurant
- Founded: 2004; 22 years ago in Toronto, Ontario, Canada
- Area served: Ontario, Canada
- Key people: John F. Lettieri (CEO)
- Website: www.heroburgers.com

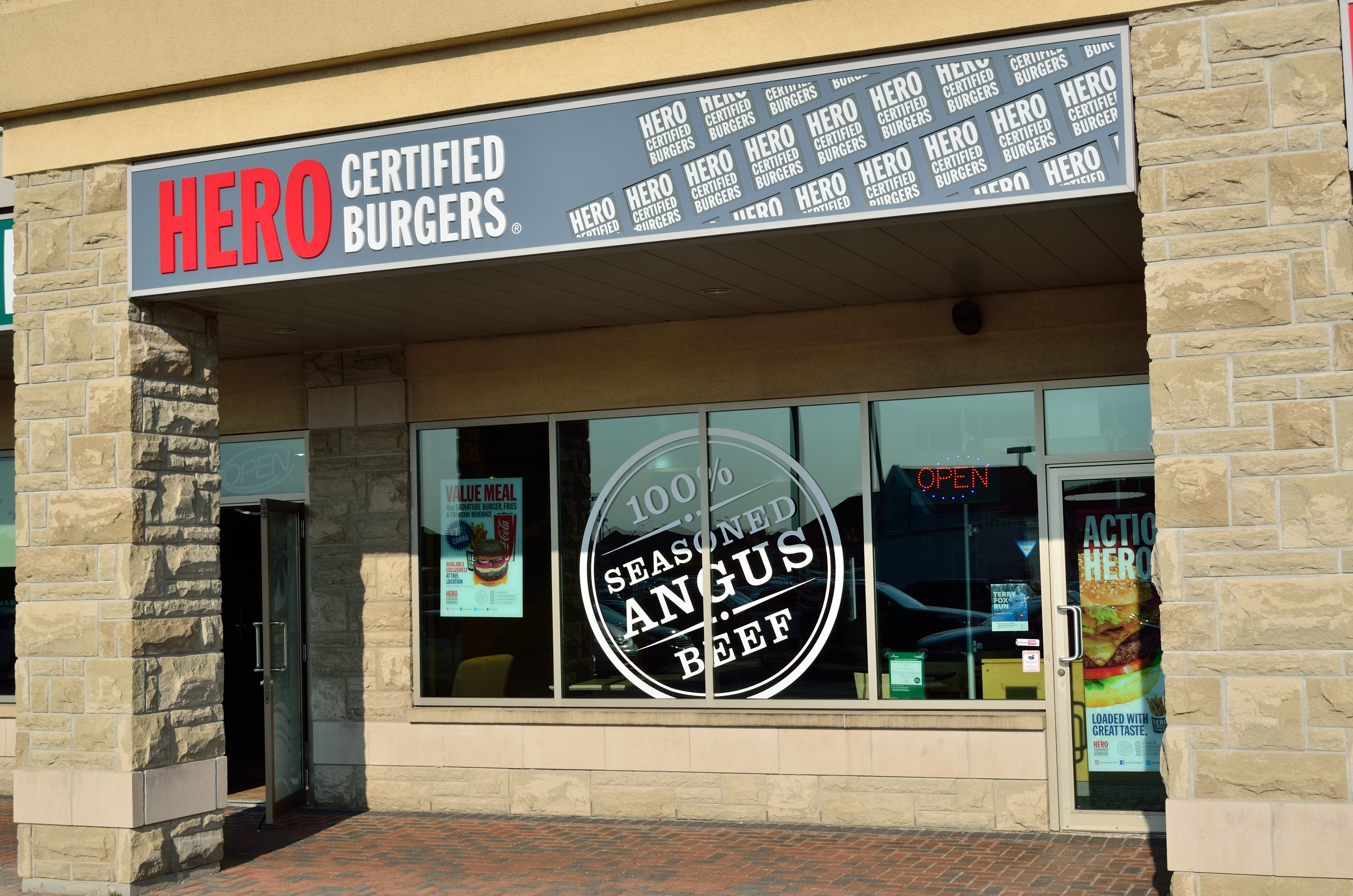
Hero Certified Burgers in Richmond Hill

Hero Certified Burgers is a Canadian restaurant chain franchise that sells hamburgers and other quick service restaurant fare. It is based in Toronto, Ontario, Canada, and was founded in 2004. It had almost 60 locations as of March 2017.

== History ==
The chain was founded in 2004 by John Lettieri, who opened the first store in Hazelton Lanes in Yorkville. Lettieri also owns the restaurant chain Lettieri café, based in Toronto. The company was the first Canadian franchise to focus on the provision of fast foods using food products from vendors that adhere to sustainable practices, using sustainably-sourced beef. The chain serves Cavendish Farms branded french fries from Prince Edward Island.

The chain opened a franchise in the United States in 2015 in Elmwood Village, Buffalo, New York, but closed by the end of 2016. In 2017, the chain expanded to Montreal, Quebec, but closed in 2023.

The chain utilizes virtual kitchens for some of its locations.

== See also ==
- List of Canadian restaurant chains
- List of hamburger restaurants
