= Cora (restaurant) =

Canadian chain of casual restaurants

Coramark Inc.
- Cora restaurant logo

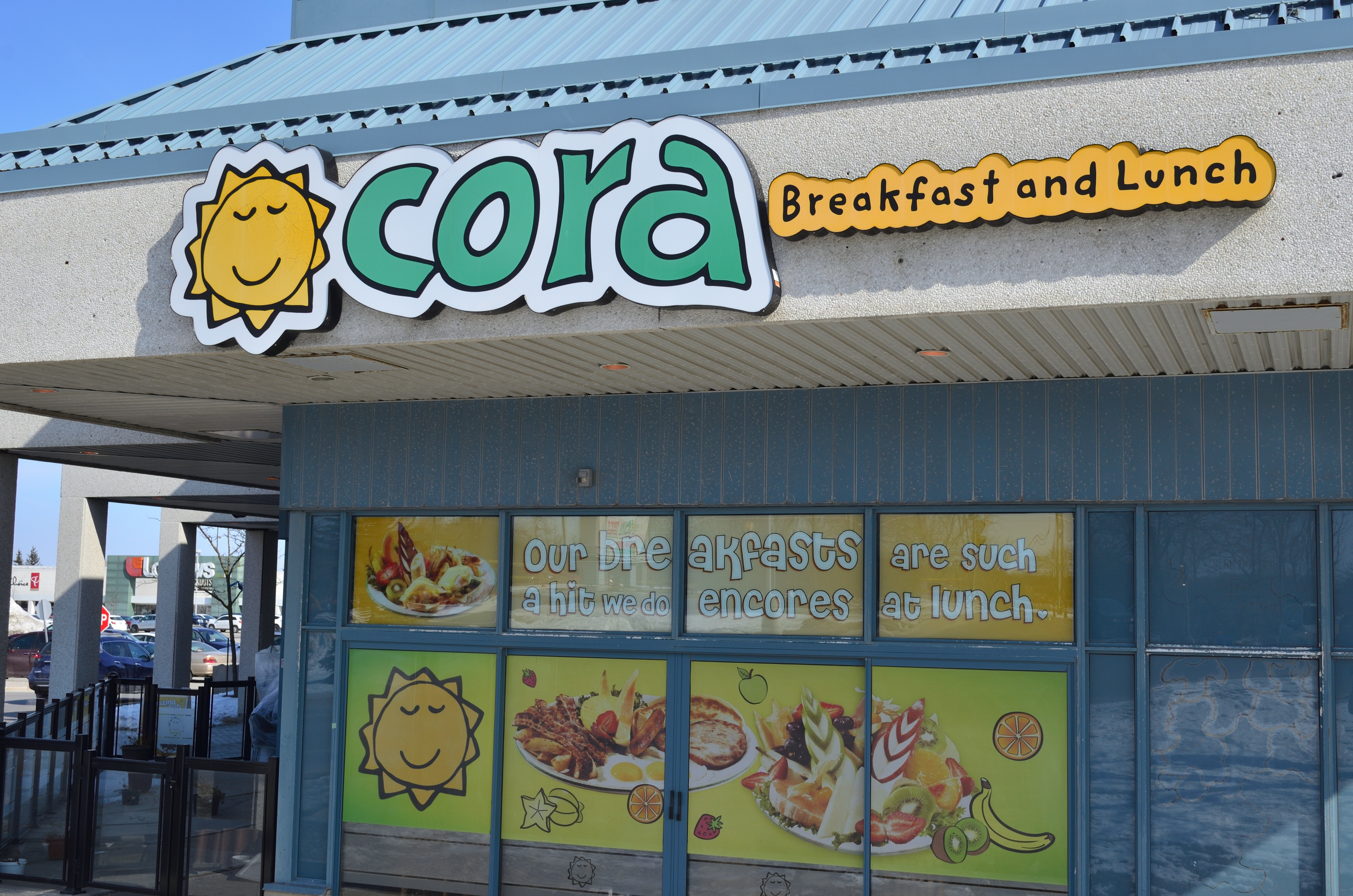
- Cora in Richmond Hill
- Trade name: Cora
- Type: Franchise
- Industry: Service
- Genre: Casual restaurant
- Founded: 1987; 39 years ago
- Founder: Cora Tsouflidou
- Headquarters: Sainte-Thérèse, Quebec, Canada
- Number of locations: 130
- Area served: Canada
- Key people: Nicholas Tsouflidou (President)
- Products: Breakfast and light lunches (fruits, vegetables, egg products)
- Owner: Cora Tsouflidou
- Website: www.chezcora.com

Coramark Inc. (doing business as Cora) is a Canadian chain of casual restaurants serving breakfast and lunch. Until 2008, the chain was known as Chez Cora déjeuners... in Quebec, and now just Cora elsewhere in Canada. Franchises are located in all provinces.

Chez Cora began in 1987 when Cora Tsouflidou opened a snack bar in Montreal, Quebec, Canada. It is now a chain of more than 50 franchises in Quebec and 130 across Canada.

== Events ==
On March 8, 2017, Cora's president, Nicholas Tsouflidis, was kidnapped at gunpoint from his home near Montreal by unknown men. Tsouflidis was found the next day unharmed in Laval.

== See also ==
- List of Canadian restaurant chains
