= Crabby Joe's =

Canadian restaurant chain

Crabby Joe's Bar ● Grill
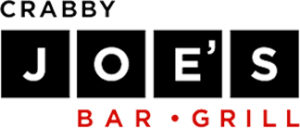
- Type: Subsidiary
- Industry: Restaurant
- Founded: 1996; 30 years ago
- Founder: Gus Karamountzos
- Headquarters: Mississauga, Ontario
- Number of locations: 35
- Area served: Ontario, Canada
- Key people: Gus Karamountzos (president, Obsidian Group Inc.); Chris Sideris (vice president, Crabby Joe's Bar ● Grill)
- Parent: Obsidian Group
- Website: Crabby Joe's; Obsidian Group Inc.

Crabby Joe's Bar ● Grill is a Canadian restaurant chain operating in 11 locations in Ontario in 2022. The restaurants are characterized by a "casual relaxed" theme, with natural brick, hardwoods, earth tone colour schemes, plasma TVs, classic art reproductions and a mix of booths and tables.

== History ==
Crabby Joe's Bar ● Grill opened its first location in Ingersoll, Ontario, Canada, in 1996.

The chain is managed by Obsidian Group.

The identity of Crabby Joe was created by React Communication of London, Ontario.

== Franchise ==
There are 11 store locations in southern Ontario and plans to expand into Angus. Each franchise owner completes eight weeks of pre-opening training. Support personnel visit the owner's restaurant for three to four weeks after the restaurant opens. Following this, the owner has continuing visits from the district managers.

The cost of a franchise is $35,000 which is paid once the franchise agreement is signed. The royalty fee is 5% of the total sales which is characterized under the franchise agreement and is paid on a weekly basis to the Obsidian Group Inc. The marketing fee is 2% of total sales which is defined in the franchise agreement and is paid weekly to Obsidian. These fees are kept in a "Crabby Joe's Marketing Account" and are used for system advertising and promotion of the Crabby Joe's system as established by the franchisor. The franchise regulations prevent Obsidian from disclosing return of investment made. What can be made is totally based on various variables including: sales mix, competition in the area, operational costs, time of year and more.

== Locations ==
Crabby Joe's Bar ● Grill has locations in Brantford, Kitchener, Woodstock, Stratford, London, Sarnia, Exeter, and Grand Bend, Ontario. Former locations include Beamsville, Waterloo, Listowel, Strathroy, Petrolia, and Essex, Ontario.

== See also ==
- List of Canadian restaurant chains
