= Coffee Time =

Canadian chain of snack and coffee shops

- Company type: Private
- Industry: Restaurants
- Founded: 1982; 44 years ago, in Bolton, Ontario
- Headquarters: Scarborough, Ontario, Canada
- Key people: Tom Michalopoulos
- Products: Coffee; Doughnuts; Bagels; Muffins; Soups; Sandwiches; Iced cappuccinos Ice cream
- Parent: Chairman's Brand Corporation
- Website: www.coffeetime.ca

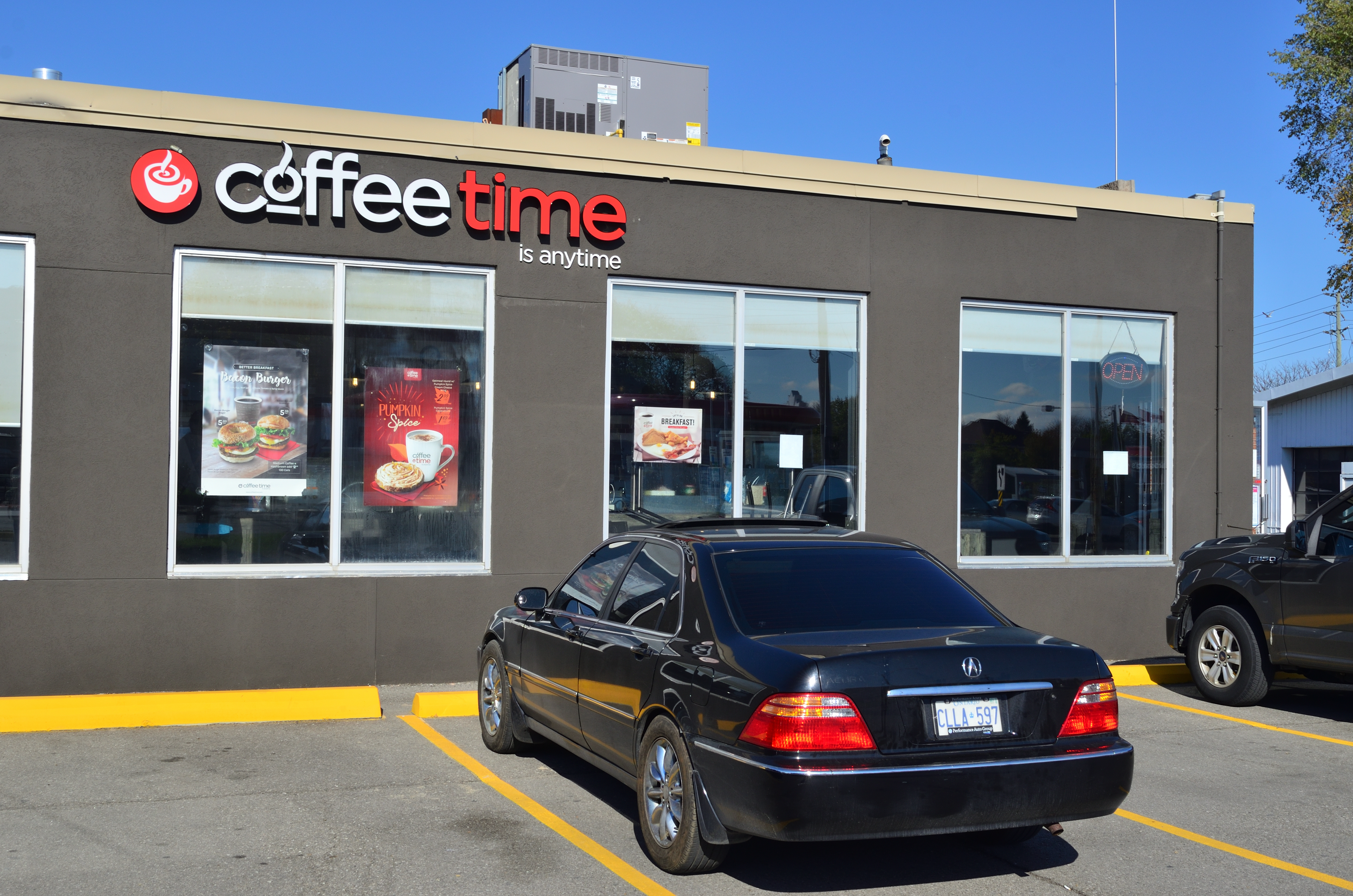
Coffee Time in Richmond Hill

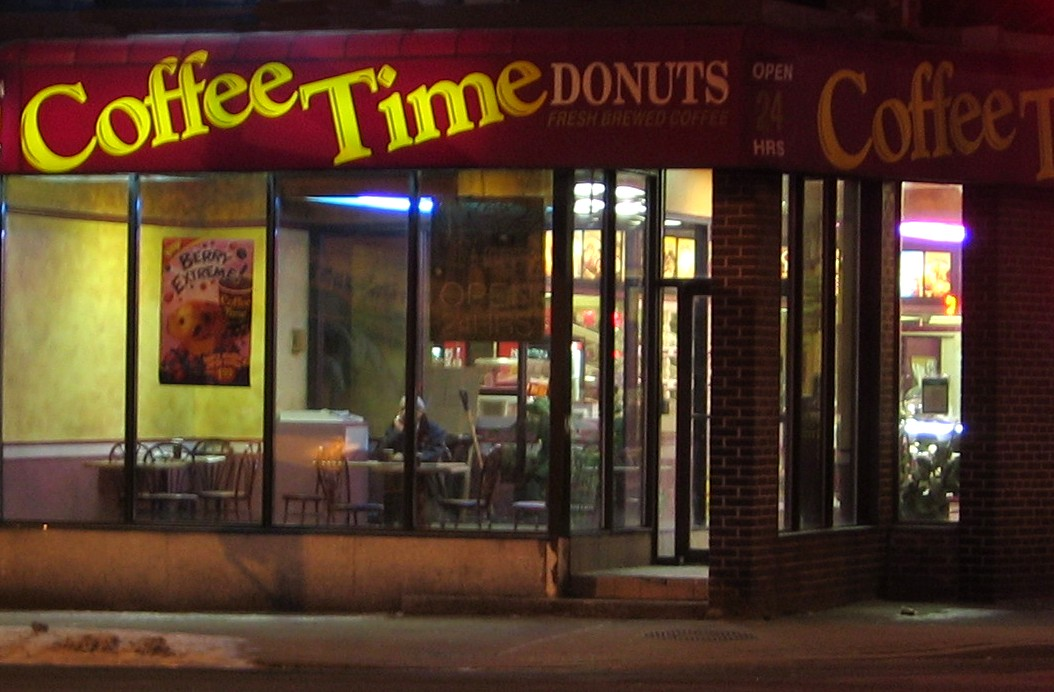
A former restaurant in Bloordale Village, Toronto.

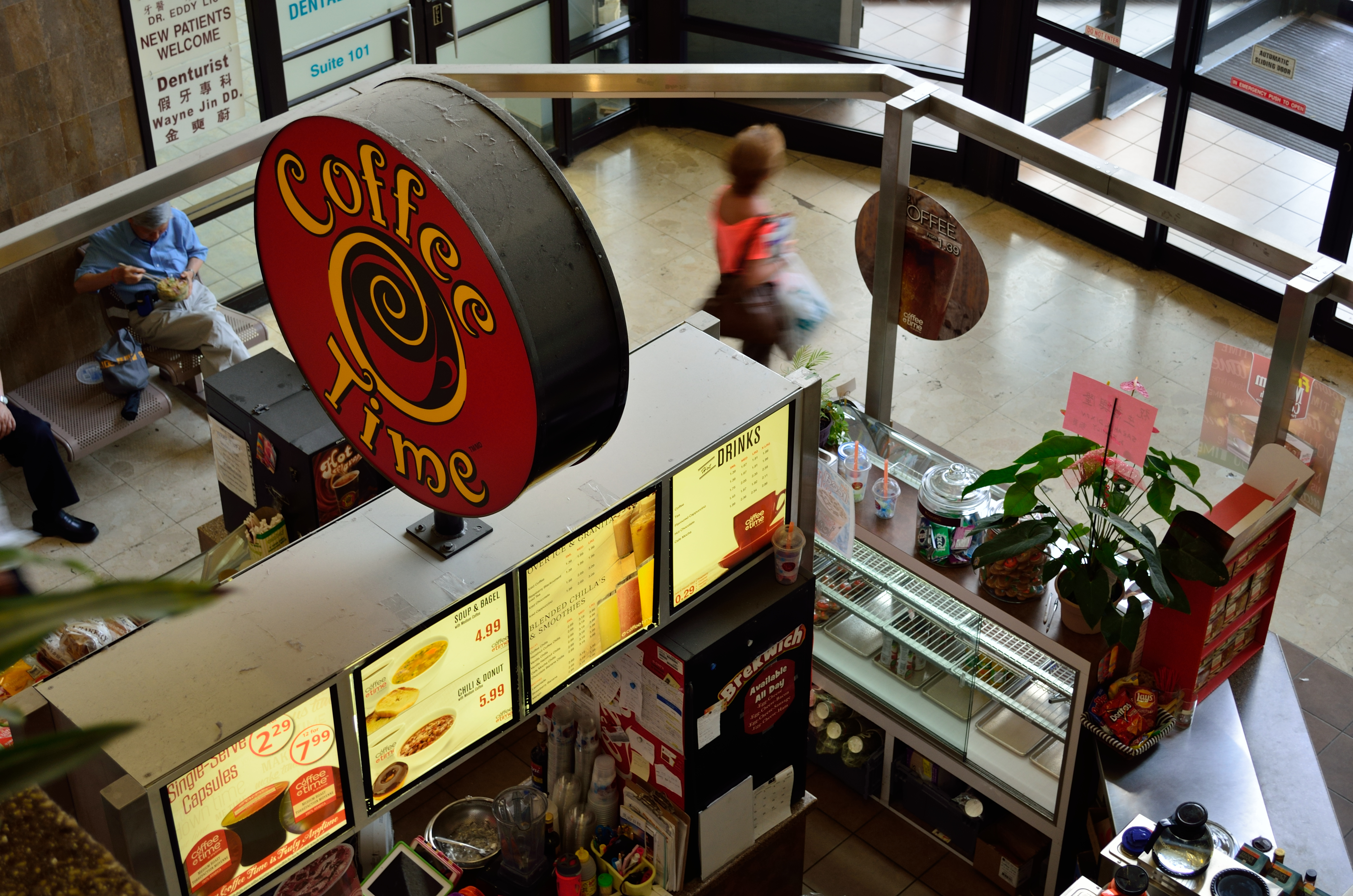
Coffee Time in Scarborough

Coffee Time is a chain of Canadian snack and coffee shops, headquartered in Scarborough, Ontario. Coffee Time has operated as many as over 100 stores across Canada in Ontario and Alberta; however, by February 2023, their website shows approximately 30 locations. Coffee Time serves coffee along with other specialty drinks, baked goods, breakfast sandwiches, and deli sandwiches and soup.

== History ==
Coffee Time was founded in 1982 by Tom Michalopoulos in Bolton, Ontario. The first stores were operated under license agreements before they moved onto franchising in the late 1980s. In October 2006, Chairman's Brand Corporation (Coffee Time's parent company) purchased the Afton Food Group, which owned Robin's Donuts, 241 Pizza, and Mrs. Powell's Cinnamon Buns. In 2014, Coffee Time began updating and rebranding its locations.

== Coffee Time Arena ==
An indoor soccer arena was built in 1998 in Vaughan, Ontario, and it was named "Coffee Time Arena." Located about 300 m east of Martin Grove Road (location number 7500/7700), it is near an industrialized area and north of Vaughan Grove Sports Park. The complex also includes an outdoor soccer field. The name was used for only three years before the arena was sold and renamed "The Soccer Centre" in the early-2000s.

== See also ==
- List of coffeehouse chains
- List of doughnut shops
- List of Canadian restaurant chains
