= Smitty's =

Canadian casual dining restaurant chain

- Company type: Privately held company
- Industry: Restaurants
- Genre: Casual dining
- Founded: 1960; 66 years ago
- Founders: Walter Chan
- Headquarters: Calgary, Alberta
- Number of locations: 83
- Areas served: Canada
- Key people: Jason Kaytor, President
- Parent: Equicapita
- Website: www.smittys.ca

Smitty's is a casual dining restaurant based in Canada. It was founded in 1960 in Calgary, Alberta. In April 2018, the company was acquired by Equicapita Investment Corp, a private company buyout fund based in Calgary.

== See also ==
- List of Canadian restaurant chains
