= Wild Wing Restaurants =

Canadian fast food franchised restaurant

Wild Wing Hospitality Inc.

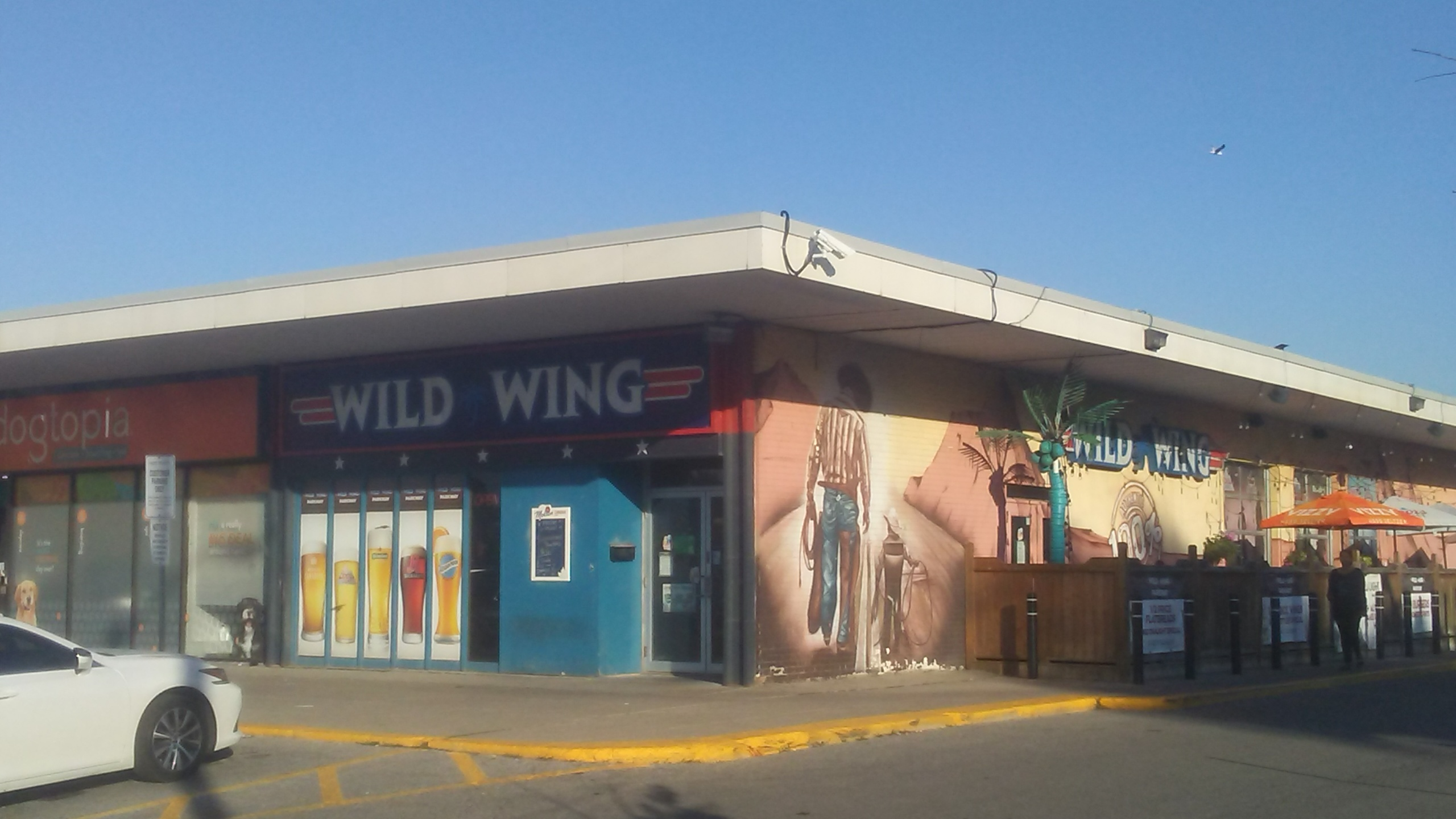
- A Wild Wing restaurant in Scarborough, Toronto
- Industry: Restaurant chain
- Founded: 1999; 27 years ago in Sunderland, Ontario, Canada
- Founder: Rick Smiciklas
- Headquarters: King City, Ontario, Canada
- Number of locations: 106 (December 2023)
- Area served: Canada
- Key people: Clark McKeown (President/Owner)
- Products: Chicken wings, Alcohol
- Brands: Wild Wing Roadhouse
- Website: www.wildwingrestaurants.com

Wild Wing Restaurants is a Canadian franchised restaurant chain that specializes in chicken wings, quick serve foods, and other related products.

== History ==
Wild Wing Restaurants Inc., originally known as Wild Wing, was established in Sunderland, Ontario, on March 17, 1999, by Rick Smiciklas. Its main business is focused on flavoured chicken wings. By 2008, it had opened 32 franchise restaurants in Ontario, and by March 2016 it had 85 locations throughout Canada, primarily in Ontario. The business was acquired by Clark McKeown on March 5, 2015.

== Operations ==
Wild Wing Restaurants headquarters is located in King City, a combined corporate office and restaurant that had a soft opening in early March 2016. It had previously had a temporary headquarters in Aurora and has 85 locations, primarily in Ontario.

== See also ==
- List of Canadian restaurant chains
- List of fast-food chicken restaurants
