= Jack Astor's Bar and Grill =

Canadian restaurant chain

- Type: Privately held company
- Industry: Restaurant chain
- Founded: 1990
- Headquarters: Burlington, Ontario, Canada
- Number of locations: 41
- Parent: Service Inspired Restaurants Corporation
- Website: www.jackastors.com

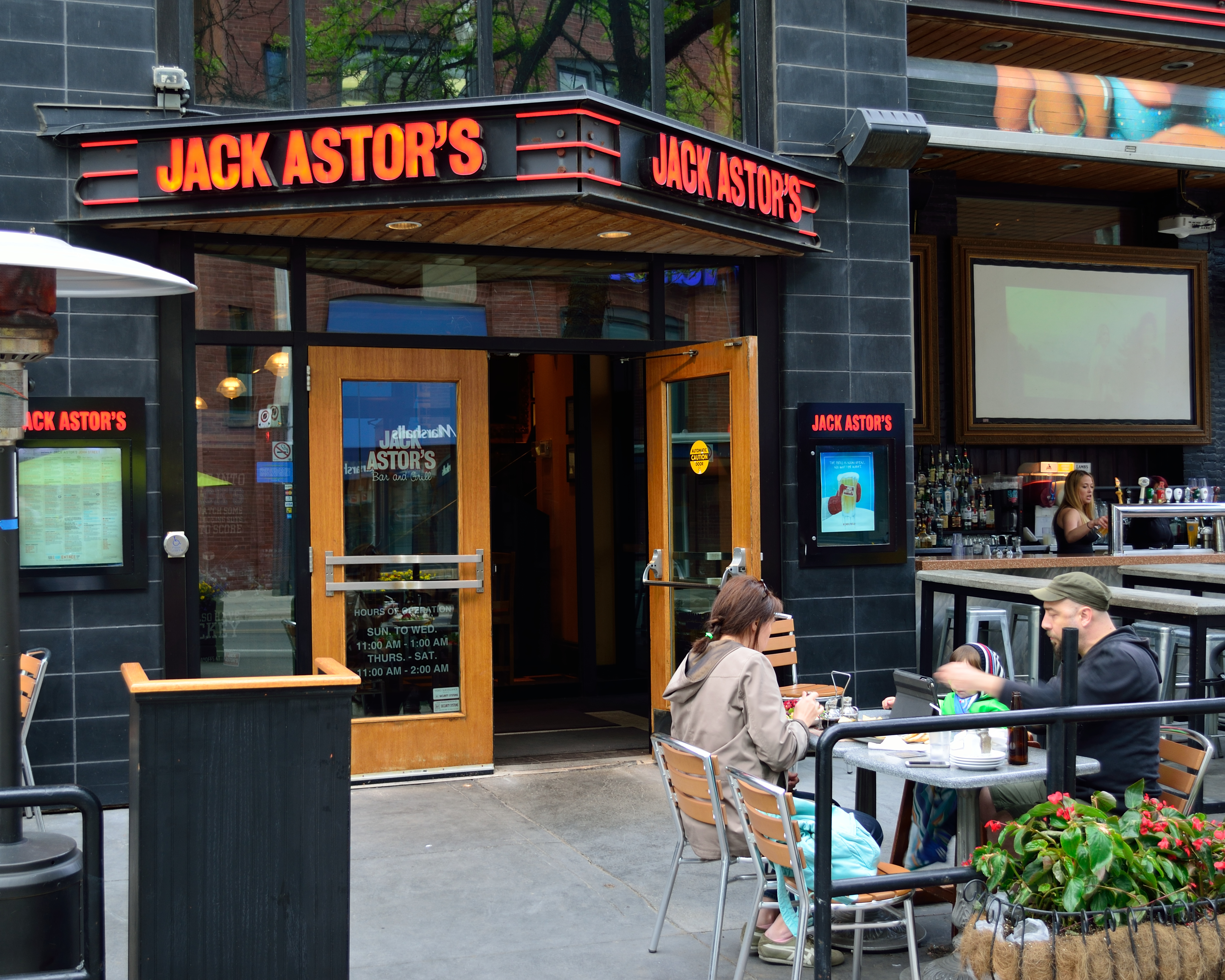
Jack Astor's in Toronto in 2015

Jack Astor's Bar and Grill is a chain of 40 restaurants located in Ontario, Quebec, Newfoundland and Labrador, Nova Scotia, and formerly Alberta, New York, North Carolina and Texas.All locations include a restaurant and bar area. It is corporately owned by Service Inspired Restaurants, which are based out of Burlington, Ontario.

The restaurant used to feature a neon sign with the restaurant name, flashing the "tor'" portion of the word "Astor's". During renovations, the joke was phased out.

The first location opened in St. Catharines, Ontario, in 1990.

== See also ==
- List of Canadian restaurant chains
