= Scores (restaurant) =

Restaurant chain in Quebec, Canada

- Company type: Subsidiary of MTY Food Group
- Industry: Casual dining restaurant
- Founded: 1995; 31 years ago
- Headquarters: Montreal, Quebec, Canada
- Area served: Quebec
- Key people: Eric Lefebvre, CEO
- Products: Roast chicken, Ribs, Brochettes, Steaks, Sandwiches & Wraps, All-you-can-eat Salad bar
- Website: scores.ca

Scores, also referred to as Scores Rotisserie, is a chain of restaurants primarily located in Quebec, with a current presence of 30 establishments as of 2024. It was founded in Montreal, Quebec in 1995.

Scores specializes in roasted chicken and ribs, offering an all-you-can-eat salad bar at all of its locations.

The restaurant chain is now owned by MTY Food Group, after their purchase of former owner Imvescor Restaurant Group Inc. (formerly known as Imvescor Inc. / Pizza Delight Corporation Ltd.) based in Moncton. MTY also owns numerous other restaurant chains.

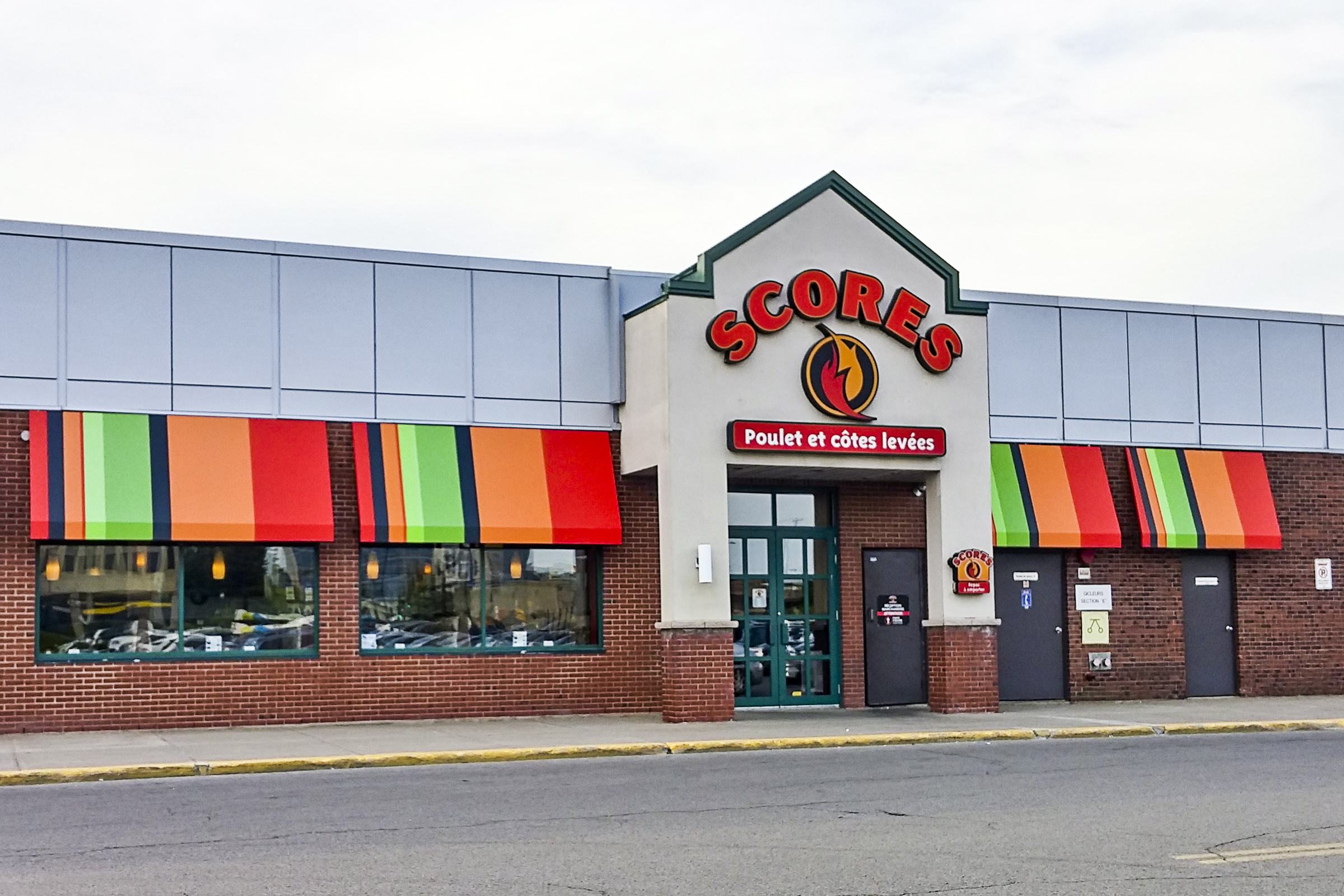
A Scores restaurant

== See also ==
- List of Canadian restaurant chains
- List of chicken restaurants
