= 241 Pizza =

Canadian quick-serve pizza restaurant chain

241 Pizza (2006) Ltd.

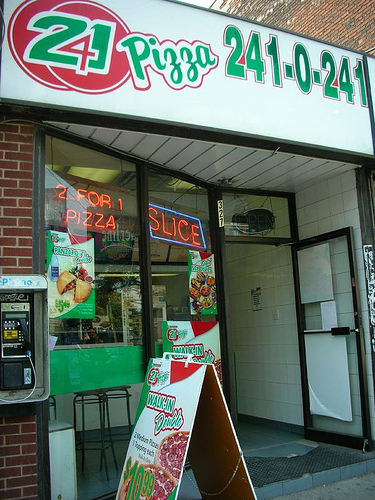
- A 241 Pizza restaurant in Toronto, Ontario
- Industry: Food delivery; Franchising; Quick Service Restaurants
- Genre: Pizzeria
- Founded: 1986; 40 years ago
- Headquarters: 77 Progress Avenue; Toronto, Ontario; M1P 2Y7
- Area served: Ontario; Saskatchewan; Newfoundland and Labrador
- Products: Pizza; Wings; Fresh Pizza Slices
- Parent: Chairman's Brand Corporation
- Website: 241pizza.com

241 Pizza (2006) Ltd. is a Canadian franchise chain of quick-serve pizza restaurants headquartered in the Toronto district of Scarborough, Ontario.

241 Pizza has 62 locations across Ontario, predominantly in Southern Ontario. The chain has expanded throughout Canada, with stores in other provinces across the country in Newfoundland, Manitoba, and Saskatchewan.

== History ==
241 Pizza was founded in Toronto in 1986. Since then, 241 Pizza has expanded across Ontario, and has locations in four provinces.

Coffee Time's parent company Chairman's Brand Corp. acquired 241 Pizza in October 2006.

== See also ==
- List of Canadian pizza chains
