= Wild Wing Cafe =

American restaurant chain

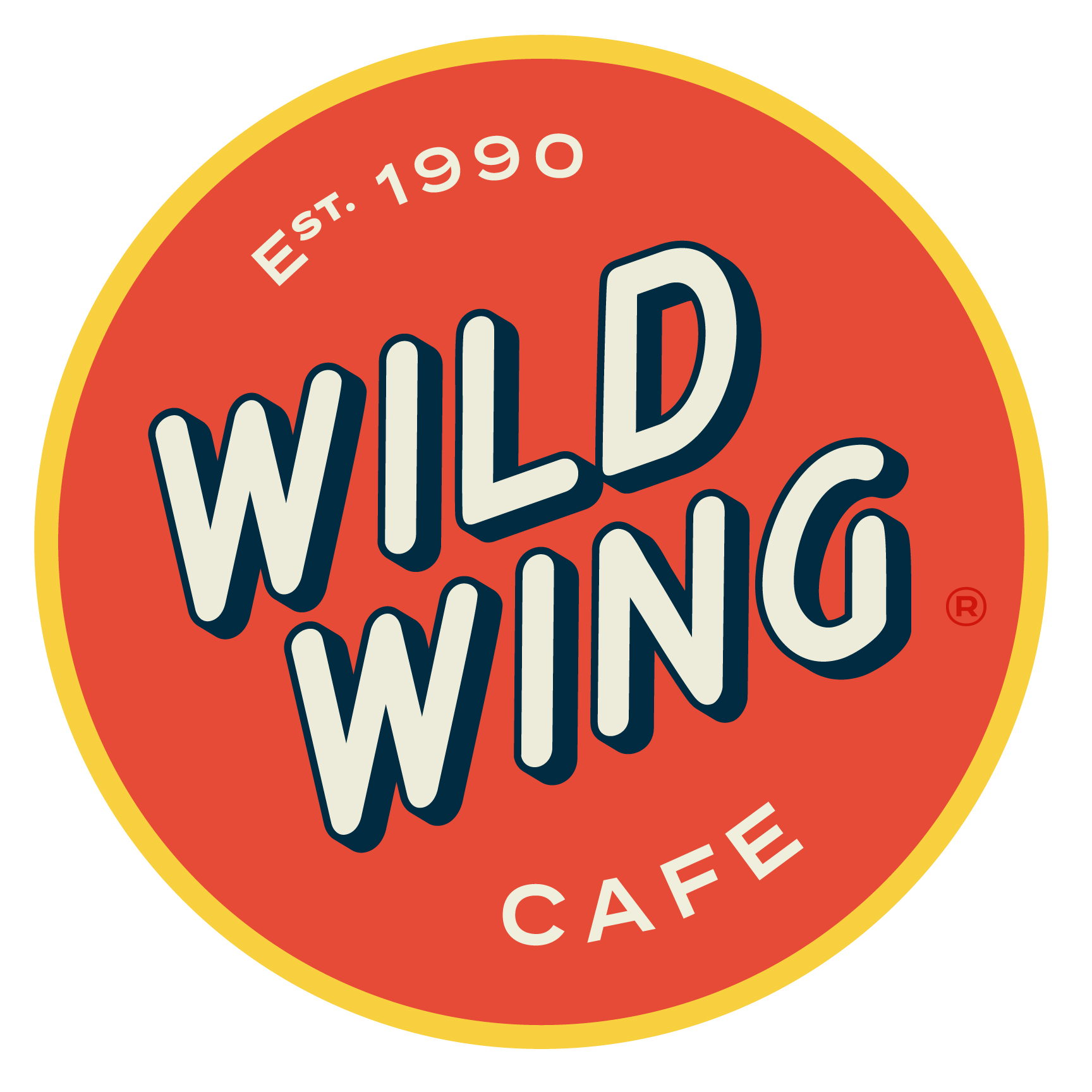
- Company type: Private
- Industry: Restaurant chain
- Founded: June 22, 1990; 35 years ago in Hilton Head, South Carolina
- Headquarters: Charlotte, North Carolina, United States
- Number of locations: 17 restaurants (2025)
- Area served: Alabama; Georgia; North Carolina; South Carolina; Tennessee; Virginia
- Key people: Mark Cote (President)
- Owner: Axum Capital Partners
- Website: wildwingcafe.com

Wild Wing Cafe is a restaurant chain in the southern and eastern parts of the United States with 17 locations in six U.S. states and best known for chicken wings and beer selection. It is headquartered in Charlotte, North Carolina.

== Background ==
Their chain's motto is "Hot Wings, Cold Beer, Good Times." Wild Wing Cafe was financed by Atlanta native Dianne Crowley and her husband Cecil, who opened the chain's first location in Hilton Head, South Carolina in June 1990. Dianne came up with the idea and financed the venture. Diane, prior to the creation of Wild Wing, was head of the P.R. Firm that represented the Atlanta Falcons Chapter of the NFL Alumni Association, and hosted the NFL Alumni Charity Golf Classic for the Ronald McDonald House. By 2001, it had grown to seven locations.

On March 17, 2009, a Wild Wing Cafe franchisee filed for Chapter 11 bankruptcy, but would continue operating during the process.

In January 2012, a majority interest in the chain was secured by Charlotte, North Carolina–based Axum Capital Partnership, an investment company whose founders include a former National Football League Pro Bowler, Muhsin Muhammad.

Some locations feature live music in the evenings, and recording artist Edwin McCain started his career playing shows at Wild Wing Cafe.

On July 19, 2023, Wild Wing Cafe filed for Chapter 11 bankruptcy after closing 15 restaurants in early 2023, blaming impacts caused by the COVID-19 pandemic and failure to pay a $12.5 million loan.

In May 2024, Wild Wing Cafe warned that it may either have to dismiss its bankruptcy procedure or convert it into a Chapter 7 bankruptcy liquidation. The company has failed to file timely reports, pay taxes in time, and gross mismanagement.

== Locations ==
Wild Wing Cafe is currently located throughout six different states in the U.S. with a total of 17 locations as of 2025. Some operations are company owned locations whereas some are franchised.
