= Sunset Grill (Canadian restaurant chain) =

Canadian fast food restaurant chain

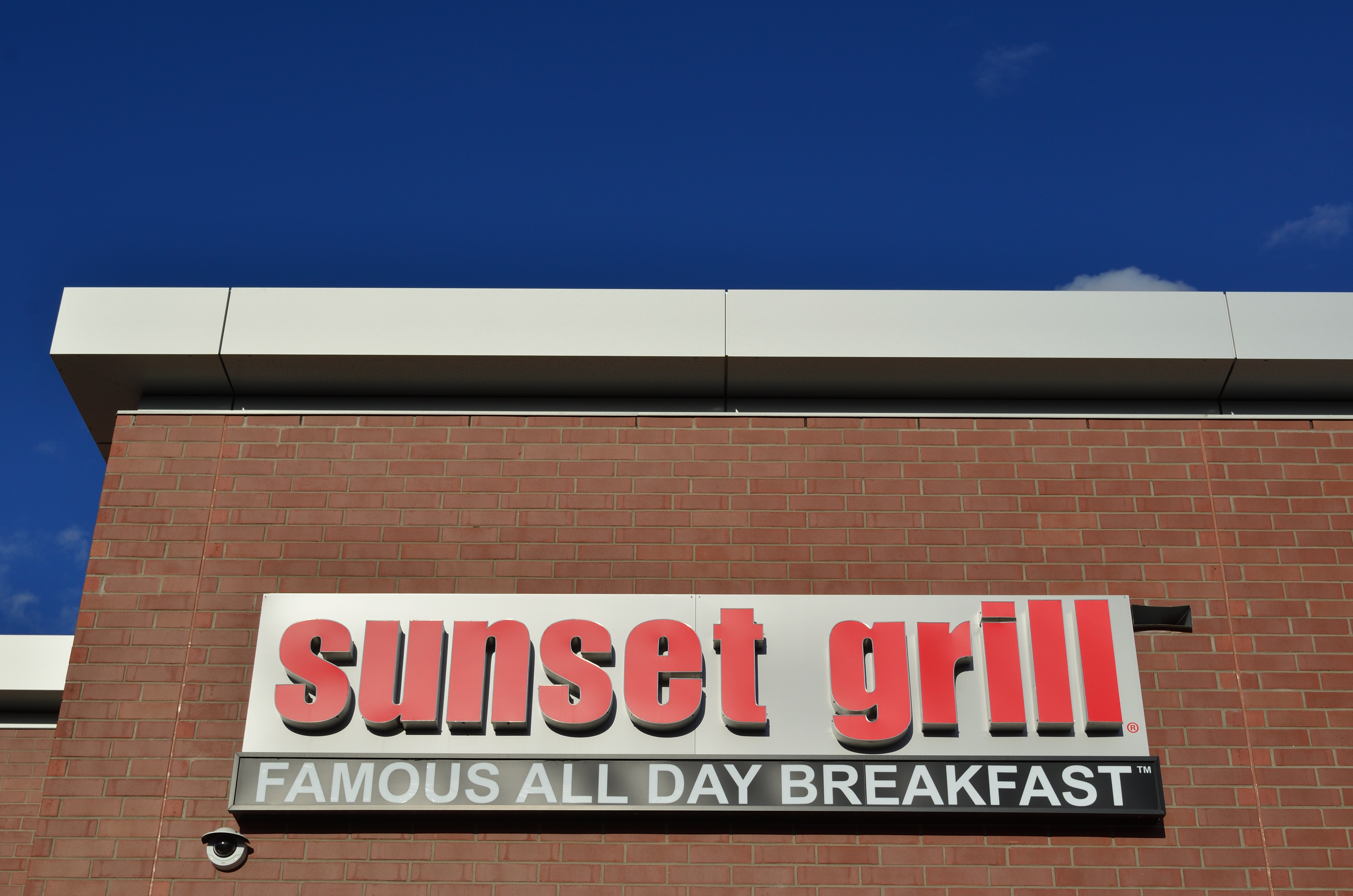
Sunset Grill in Markham, ON

Sunset Grill is a Canadian-based restaurant chain specializing in breakfast items.

The restaurant was founded in 1985 by Angelo Christou in The Beaches neighbourhood of Toronto, Ontario. As of March 2019, they have more than 80 locations in southern Ontario, mostly in the Greater Toronto and Hamilton area.
