= Bâton Rouge (restaurant) =

Canadian restaurant chain

Bâton Rouge Grillhouse & Bar
- Type: Subsidiary
- Industry: Restaurants (casual dining)
- Founded: 1992; 34 years ago, in Montreal, Quebec, Canada
- Headquarters: Montreal, Quebec, Canada
- Key people: Yves Devin (COO); Bernard Imbeault (chair of Imvescor)
- Products: Food (including chicken, salads, french fries)
- Parent: MTY Food Group
- Website: www.batonrouge.ca/en/ (English) www.batonrouge.ca (French)

Bâton Rouge Grillhouse & Bar is a Canadian restaurant chain serving baby back ribs, steaks, and grilled fish.

== History ==
Bâton Rouge Grillhouse & Bar (Previously known as Steakhouse & Bar) was founded in Laval, Quebec in 1992. There are 29 Bâton Rouges in Canada as of 2010 mainly in Quebec (Montreal, Quebec City, Sherbrooke) and Ontario (Greater Toronto Area, Ottawa) with sites ranging from 7,000 to 9,000 square feet (840 m^{2}). The first restaurant is located at the Carrefour Laval.

The restaurant chain is now owned by MTY Food Group, after their purchase of former owner Imvescor Restaurant Group Inc. (formerly known as Imvescor Inc. / Pizza Delight Corporation Ltd.) based in Moncton. MTY also owns numerous other restaurant chains.

The first Bâton Rouge restaurant in Alberta was opened in July 2010 in Quarry Park, Calgary; closed in 2012, it reopened in 2013. There is also a location in Halifax, Nova Scotia.

== See also ==
- List of Canadian restaurant chains
