= ONroute =

Chain of highway rest areas in Ontario, Canada

ONroute LP

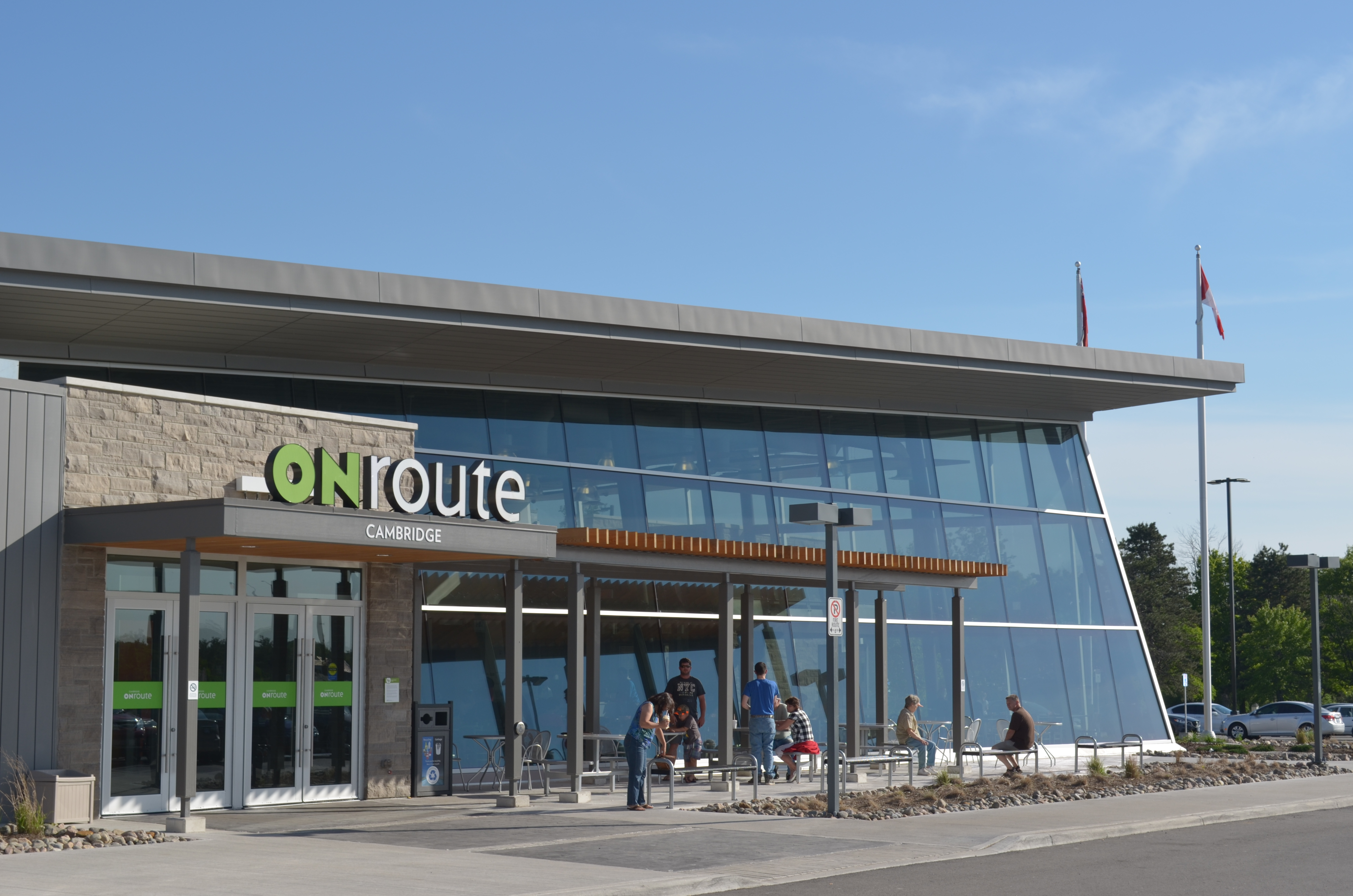
- ONroute Cambridge South location
- Type: Limited partnership
- Industry: Property management
- Founded: 2010
- Headquarters: Mississauga, Ontario, Canada
- Number of locations: 22 (Maple is currently closed)
- Key people: Andy Webb (CEO)
- Services: Rest areas
- Owner: Arjun Infrastructure Partners; Fengate Asset Management
- Website: Official website

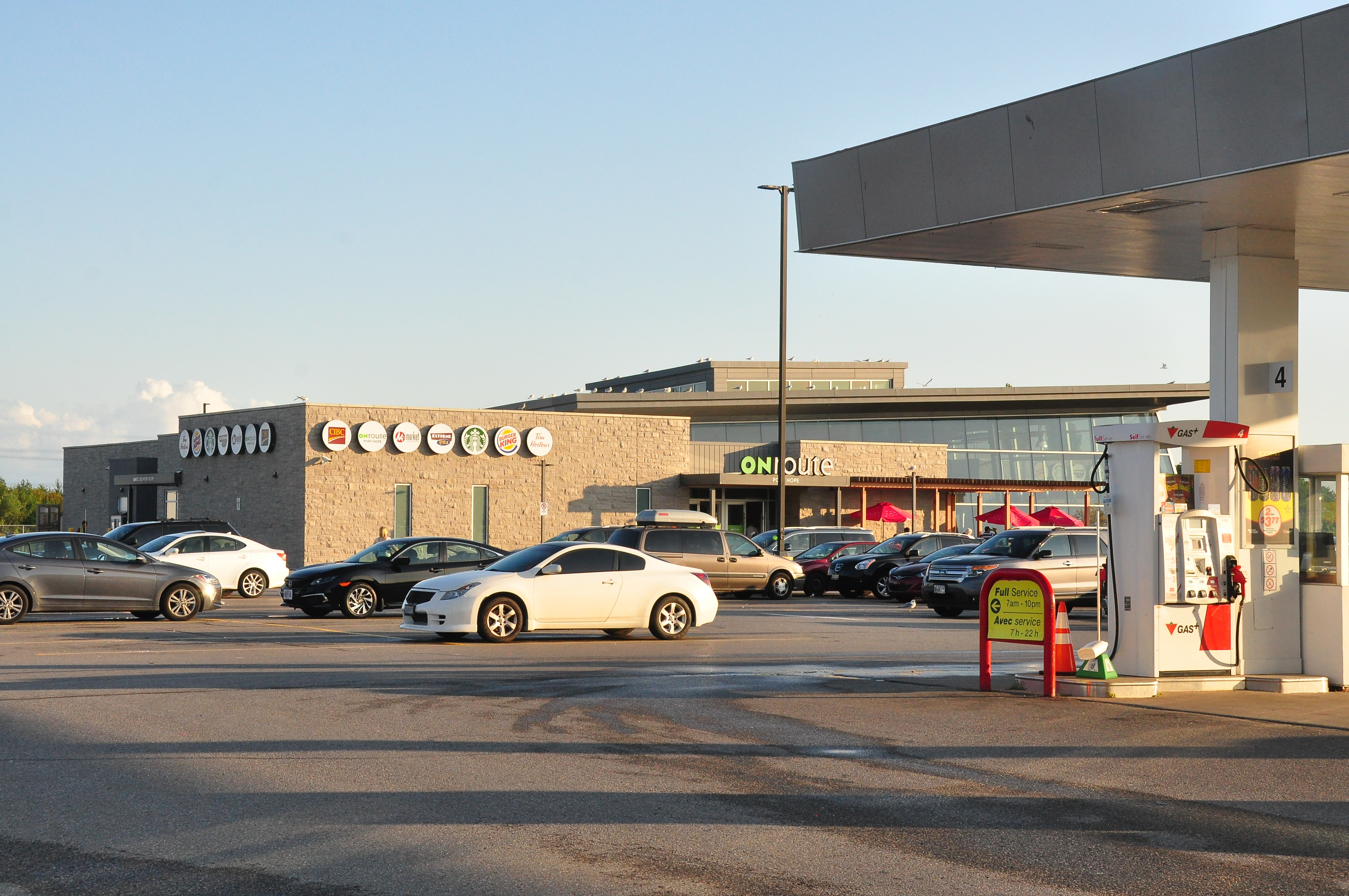
ONroute Port Hope

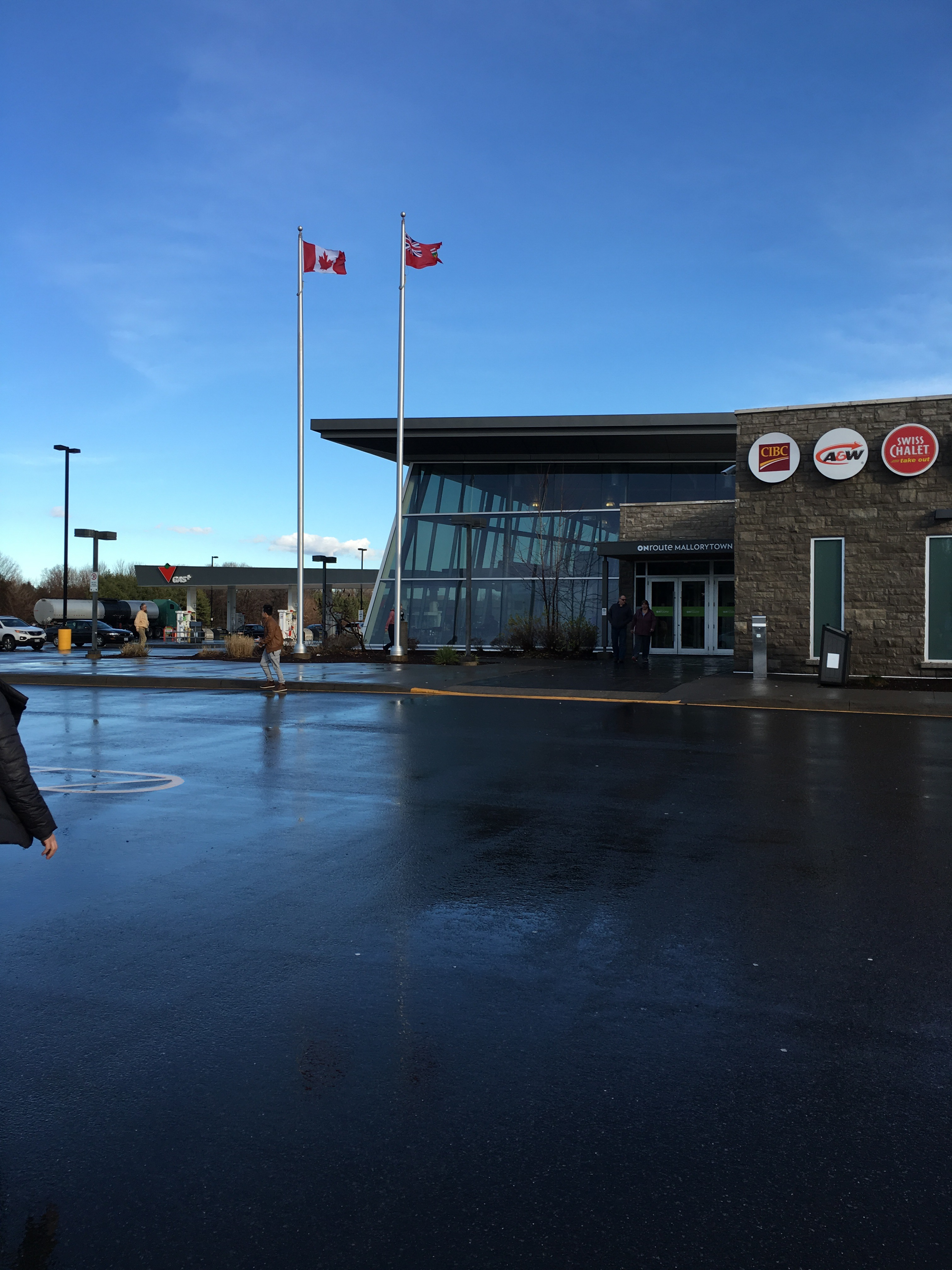
Exterior view of ONroute Mallorytown South location

ONroute LP is a Canadian service company which has a 50-year concession to operate highway rest areas along Highway 400 and Highway 401 in the province of Ontario until 2060. The company was founded as Host Kilmer Service Centres, a joint venture between international hospitality company HMSHost (then a subsidiary of Autogrill) and Kilmer van Nostrand (an investment company owned by Canadian businessman Larry Tanenbaum). ONroute was acquired by Arjun Infrastructure Partners and Fengate Asset Management in May 2019.

ONroute service centres include gas stations, a range of branded fast food options, convenience stores, and public parking and seating. The "ONroute" brand name is a modified version of the French phrase "en route", using the province's postal abbreviation of "ON".

== History ==
=== Original highway rest areas (1960s–2007) ===
Construction of Ontario Highways 400 and 401 began in the early 1950s, with the last section of 401 completed in 1968. Both roads were intended as bypasses, going around populated areas instead of through them (the highways 11/27 and 2 which they replaced were Main Street in nearly every served community) and therefore initially had few services. A series of rest stops was constructed as part of the highway in the 1960s in rural areas to provide a full-service restaurant (later replaced with franchised fast food) and a service station (eventually curtailed to fuel only, no repair services). All but a few of these dated from the same era with strong similarity in design.

In line with the 400-series highways being fully controlled-access, all of these service centres allow general access by freeway entry/exit only and do not connect to adjacent roads, even those located in cities. Some of these urban service centres may have restricted access to surface streets, during construction, and on an ongoing basis for staff, suppliers deliveries, and waste disposal. The only exception was the Cookstown service centre, which was directly connected to Highway 89 (a surface street) as well as the Highway 400 freeway since the centre was located at their interchange.

Under the original arrangements, each rest stop on the two highways was leased by the provincial government to a major oil company; in 2007 the lessees consisted of Imperial Oil, Petro-Canada, and Shell Canada. From the late 1980s onwards, food and retail operations of most of these rest areas were contracted to Scott's Hospitality, a major publicly traded Canadian restaurant operator, offering food from brands including Wendy's, Tim Hortons, KFC, and Mr. Sub. Some centres used other providers, including two Petro-Canada service centres with McDonald's restaurants near Cambridge. In 1999 Scott's was acquired by John Bitove's Obelysk Inc., and the highway centre operations were sold to HMSHost in 2005.

=== Reconstruction (2007–2013) ===
In 2007, with most of the original contracts nearing expiry, the government of Ontario tendered the full system of highway centres to be operated on a new long term contract. Brookfield, Morguard, and European operator Areas were among the groups that submitted bids. However, Host Kilmer Service Centres, a joint venture of HMSHost and Larry Tanenbaum's family office Kilmer Van Nostrand, was provisionally selected as the new operator in 2009, with a full agreement being signed in April 2010. HKSC's agreement also gives it "first right of opportunity" to develop similar service centres on other non-tolled 400-series highways in Ontario.

The 1960s-era rest stops began to close in 2008 for demolition and remediation as the previous contracts expired, leaving many sites out of operation, or with limited service, for a year or more. HKSC began to construct its new service stations in late 2009, with the renovated centres beginning to open in summer 2010. Most of the remaining redevelopment projects were completed in 2013. Partners in the redevelopment projects included EllisDon Construction, Quadrangle, and Bruce Mau Design. All of the redeveloped locations were designed to meet the LEED certification standards of the Canadian Green Building Council, as well as current standards of accessibility for travellers with disabilities.

The Cookstown service centre closed on February 1, 2013 in order to accommodate reconfiguration of the interchange ramps between Highways 400 and 89, being replaced by a new service centre (Innisfil ONRoute) on Highway 400 north of Fourth Line which opened in June 2015.

The rest areas on Highway 401 at Ingersoll and Newcastle (both serving only the westbound carriageway) and the Highway 400 rest area in Maple (Vaughan) (serving southbound traffic only) were rebuilt in the late 1990s, ahead of the other remaining rest areas being tendered to HKSC for redevelopment, and as their design was sufficiently modern they remained in operation. The Maple service centre eventually closed on April 21, 2025 for reconstruction.

=== Subsequent developments ===
On June 13, 2019, HMS Host announced the sale of all 23 ONroute centres to Arjun Infrastructure and Fengate Asset Management. Arjun is a British company which is the minority shareholder in the similar Welcome Break chain of motorway service areas in the United Kingdom, while Fengate is a Canadian asset management firm.

In December 2021, Caroline Mulroney and Todd Smith announced that 17 of the 23 stations would have charging stations for electric vehicles installed by mid 2022, and three more by the end of 2022. They will be installed by Ivy, a joint venture between Hydro One and Ontario Power Generation, at a cost of $11.5 million.

== Services ==
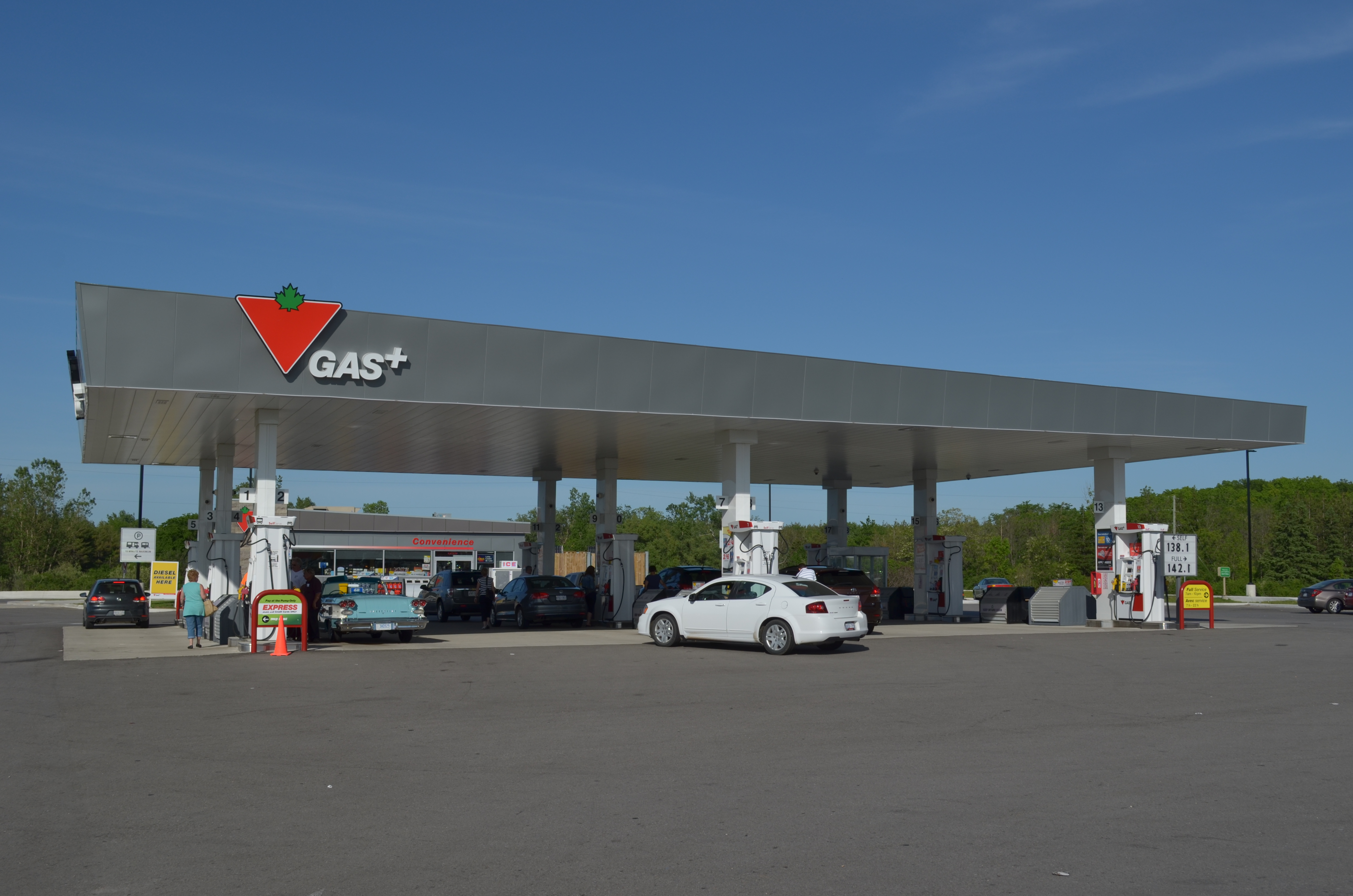
Gas station (with previous Canadian Tire Gas+ livery) at ONroute Cambridge South

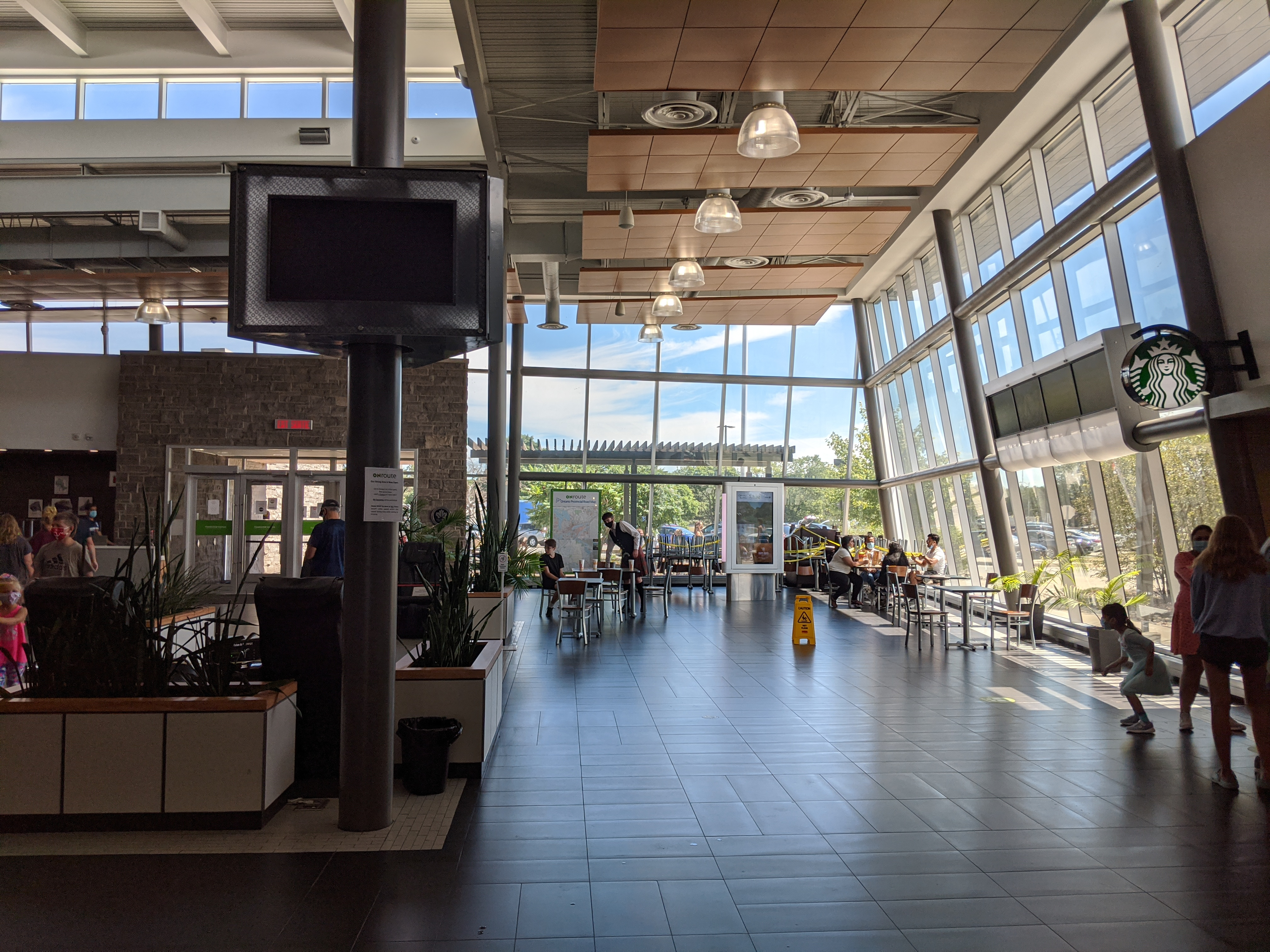
ONroute Cambridge North with limited seating and mandatory masks for patrons during the COVID-19 pandemic

ONroute locations by HKSC feature a Canadian Tire-owned gas station (as of 2024, all Canadian Tire gas stations nationwide are being converted to the Petro-Canada brand), a CIBC ATM, and a 24-hour convenience store called ON Market. While each location offers a different selection of fast food providers, all locations feature a Tim Hortons, and at opening featured some combination of A&W, Big Smoke Burger, Brioche Dorée, Burger King, Cinnabon, East Side Mario's Pronto, Extreme Pita, KFC, Taco Bell, Mr. Sub, New York Fries, Pizza Pizza, PurBlendz, Starbucks, Swiss Chalet, Wendy's or Yogen Früz outlets. In some cases, selection at the food outlets is more limited or prices higher than in non-highway locations of the same-brand chains.

Many of the brands featured initially have since been phased out; others were introduced, including KFC being replaced by Popeyes, a sibling brand of Tim Hortons and Burger King under Restaurant Brands International. As of August 2026, the brands that remain include:

All locations

- ON Market
- Petro-Canada
- Tim Hortons

Select locations

- A&W
- Burger King
- Booster Juice
- New York Fries
- Popeyes
- Starbucks
- Subway

In addition to food and fuel franchises, all ONroute locations also have a picnic area as well as free Wi-Fi. In addition, the westermost (Tilbury South) and easternmost (Bainsville) locations along Highway 401 also feature Ontario Tourist Information Centres, as they serve as gateway locations for tourists entering the province from Michigan and Quebec respectively.

== Locations ==
Map of ONroute locations

There are 19 ONroute locations sited along Highway 401 and currently three located on the southern section of Highway 400 between Toronto and Barrie (southbound at Innisfil, with a fourth – a second southbound location – under construction in Vaughan as of June 2025 to replace the non-ONRoute branded Maple service centre, and northbound at King City and Barrie).

There is no ONroute location eastbound on Highway 401 near the Quebec border corresponding to the westbound Bainsville location. Instead, Transports Québec operates an eastbound service centre in Rivière-Beaudette on Quebec Autoroute 20 (Highway 401's continuation), approximately one kilometre past the Ontario border, with a Quebec tourist information centre, and concessions operated by Imperial Oil (Esso), Couche-Tard, St-Hubert Express, and (previously) Tim Hortons.

Brands available at each location are denoted with "✓" in the tables below.

Plazas located on Highway 401 East/West
Plaza	Dir	Address	Petro	ONmarket	Tims	Starbucks	Burgers	Popeyes	Other
Tilbury South	EB	Between Exits #56 and #63 in Tilbury	✓	✓	✓		✓ BK		Ontario Travel Information Centre
Tilbury North	WB	Between Exits #56 and #63 in Tilbury	✓	✓	✓		✓ BK		
Dutton	EB	Between Exits West Lorne #137 and Dutton #149 in Dutton	✓	✓	✓		✓ A&W	✓	
West Lorne	WB	Between Lorne and Dutton 5 km from Exit 149 in West Lorne	✓	✓	✓		✓ A&W	✓	
Woodstock	EB	Between Exits 222 and #230 in Woodstock	✓	✓	✓	✓	✓ BK	✓	New York Fries
Ingersoll	WB	Between Exits 230 and 222 in Ingersoll	✓	✓	✓		✓ BK		Subway
Cambridge South	EB	Between Hwy. 6 and Hwy. 24 in Cambridge	✓	✓	✓	✓	✓ A&W		New York Fries
Cambridge North	WB	Between Hwy. 6 and Hwy. 24 in Cambridge	✓	✓	✓	✓	✓ BK	✓	Subway
Newcastle	WB	Between Exits #440 and #448 in Newcastle	✓	✓	✓	✓	✓ BK		
Port Hope	EB	Between Exits #448 and #459 in Port Hope	✓	✓	✓	✓	✓ BK	✓	Booster Juice
Trenton North	WB	Between Exits #522 and #509 in Brighton	✓	✓	✓		✓ A&W	✓	
Trenton South	EB	7 km west of Trenton	✓	✓	✓		✓ A&W		Subway
Napanee	WB	2 km west of Exit 593 in Napanee	✓	✓	✓	✓	✓ BK	✓	
Odessa	EB	Between Exits #599 and #611 in Odessa	✓	✓	✓	✓	✓ BK	✓	
Mallorytown North	WB	Between Exits #675 and #687 in Mallorytown	✓	✓	✓	✓	✓ A&W		Subway
Mallorytown South	EB	Between Exits #675 and #687 in Mallorytown	✓	✓	✓		✓ A&W		New York Fries
Morrisburg	EB	Between Exits #750 and #758 in Morrisburg	✓	✓	✓		✓ BK		
Ingleside	WB	Between Upper Canada and Dickinson Road in Ingleside	✓	✓	✓		✓ BK		
Bainsville	WB	Between Exit #825 and the Quebec border 25 km east of Cornwall in Bainsville	✓	✓	✓		✓ BK		Ontario Travel Information Centre

Plazas located on Highway 400 North/South
Plaza	Dir	Address	Petro	ONmarket	Tims	Starbucks	Burgers	Popeyes	Other
Maple	SB	Between Teston and King Roads in Vaughan	New location under construction (previous non-ONroute service plaza closed April 21, 2025)						
King City	NB	Between Teston and King Roads in King Township	✓	✓	✓	✓	✓ BK	✓	New York Fries; Subway
Innisfil	SB	Innisfil	✓	✓	✓	✓	✓ BK	✓	New York Fries; Subway; Booster Juice
Barrie	NB	Barrie	✓	✓	✓	✓	✓ A&W	✓	
