= Café de Coral =

Hong Kong Fast food

Café de Coral Holdings, Ltd.

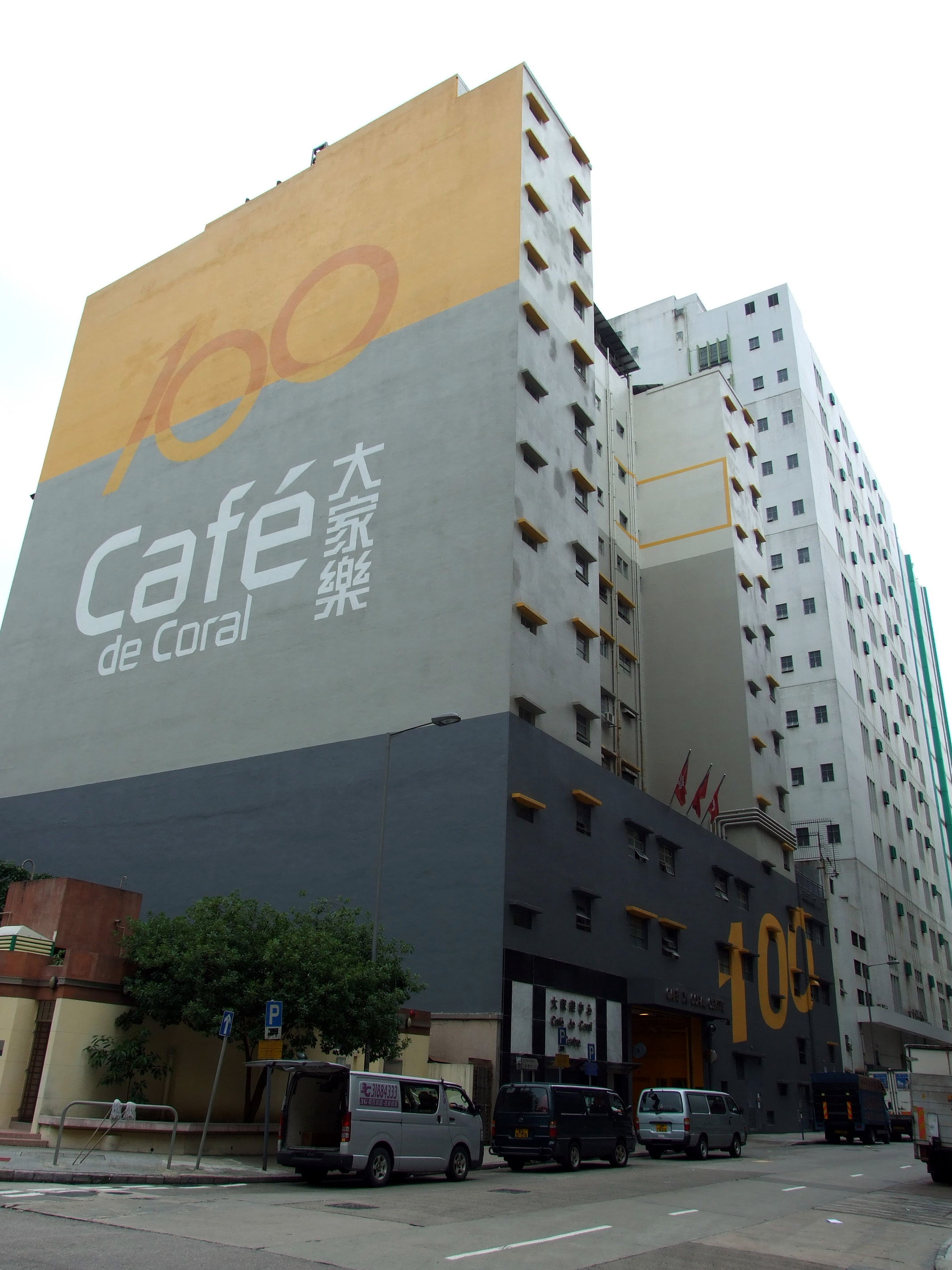
- Headquarters in Fo Tan
- Type: Public
- Traded as: SEHK: 341
- Industry: Food service
- Founded: 1968; 58 years ago in Causeway Bay, Hong Kong
- Headquarters: Fo Tan, Hong Kong
- Key people: Sunny Lo (Chairman)
- Products: Fast food; Casual dining
- Revenue: HK$4.19 billion (2018)
- Number of employees: 19,000+ (2018)
- Website: www.cafedecoral.com/eng/main/index.jsp cafedecoralfastfood.com

Café de Coral Holdings Limited
- Traditional Chinese: 大家樂集團有限公司
- Simplified Chinese: 大家乐集团有限公司
Transcriptions
Standard Mandarin
- Hanyu Pinyin: Dàjiālè Jítuán Yǒuxiàngōngsī
Yue: Cantonese
- Jyutping: daai6 gaa1 lok6 zaap6 tyun4 jau5 haan6 gung1 si1

Café de Coral Holdings, Ltd. (Chinese: 大家樂集團有限公司; Cantonese Yale: Daaihgālohk Jaahptyùhn Yáuhhaahn Gūngsī) is a Hong Kong fast-food restaurant group that owns and operates fast-food chains and restaurants, including Café de Coral, Super Super, The Spaghetti House, Oliver's Super Sandwiches, Ah Yee Leng Tong, and others.

Founded in 1968, the Café de Coral group opened its first Café de Coral restaurant in the Causeway Bay district of Hong Kong in 1969. Since then, the group has grown to operate over 580 separate outlets across its brands all over the world. It is the largest Chinese fast-food restaurant group in Hong Kong. In Hong Kong alone, it caters to over 300,000 people on a typical day.

== History ==
=== Founding ===
The founders of Café de Coral are Victor Lo Tang-seong (1915–2016), brother of Vitasoy founder Lo Kwee-seong and Fairwood founder Lo Fong-cheung, and his nephew, Lo Kai-muk. Victor Lo had the idea of running a restaurant that would feed the working class of Hong Kong at affordable prices. He incorporated Café de Coral in 1968 and started to operate the first location in Causeway Bay in September 1969 at the age of 54.

The chain gradually expanded over the next decade. In 1977, it started promoting its restaurants through TV commercials. In 1979, it established its first food-processing plant in a move to lower costs and ensure consistency. In 1986, the Café de Coral Group went public. In 1988, it opened its 50th Café de Coral restaurant. The years after this were marked by diversification, when it went on a buying spree.

=== Acquisitions and expansion ===
In May 1990, Café de Coral made its first acquisition by buying out the Ah Yee Leng Tong chain for HK$14 million. A year later, it acquired The Spaghetti House, a popular chain that served HK-style Italian food. The same year, it opened up its second food-processing plant. In 1992, it opened both its 100th restaurant and its first restaurant outside Hong Kong in the nearby city of Shenzhen.

In 1996, Café de Coral opened the first location of its new restaurant brand, Bravo le Café. Also in 1996, it acquired Scanfoods, a ham-processing and food-distribution business. In 1998, it started yet another restaurant chain called Super Super Congee & Noodle.

In 2000, continuing its trend of acquisitions, Café de Coral acquired Denny's Bakery, a bakery manufacturing and distribution business in Hong Kong. Also in 2000, it acquired Manchu Wok, a North American Chinese fast-food chain that had a strong presence in Canada and the United States. In the years following, Café de Coral also acquired China Inn (2002), New Asia Dabao (2003), and Oliver's Super Sandwiches (2003).

In 2006, Café de Coral began rolling out its "fourth-generation concept" across all of its locations, effectively renovating many restaurants to bring them up to modern standards.

In 2007, Café de Coral made an investment in the Tao Heung Group, a smaller restaurant group that operates 11 brands all over China and Hong Kong.

In 2012, Café de Coral started another restaurant chain called MiXian Sense, aiming to become the leader in the Hong Kong mixian (rice noodle) market.

Manchu Wok was sold to MTY Food Group in late 2014.

In 2016, founder Victor Lo Tang-seong died at the age of 101.

== Brands ==
=== Café de Coral ===
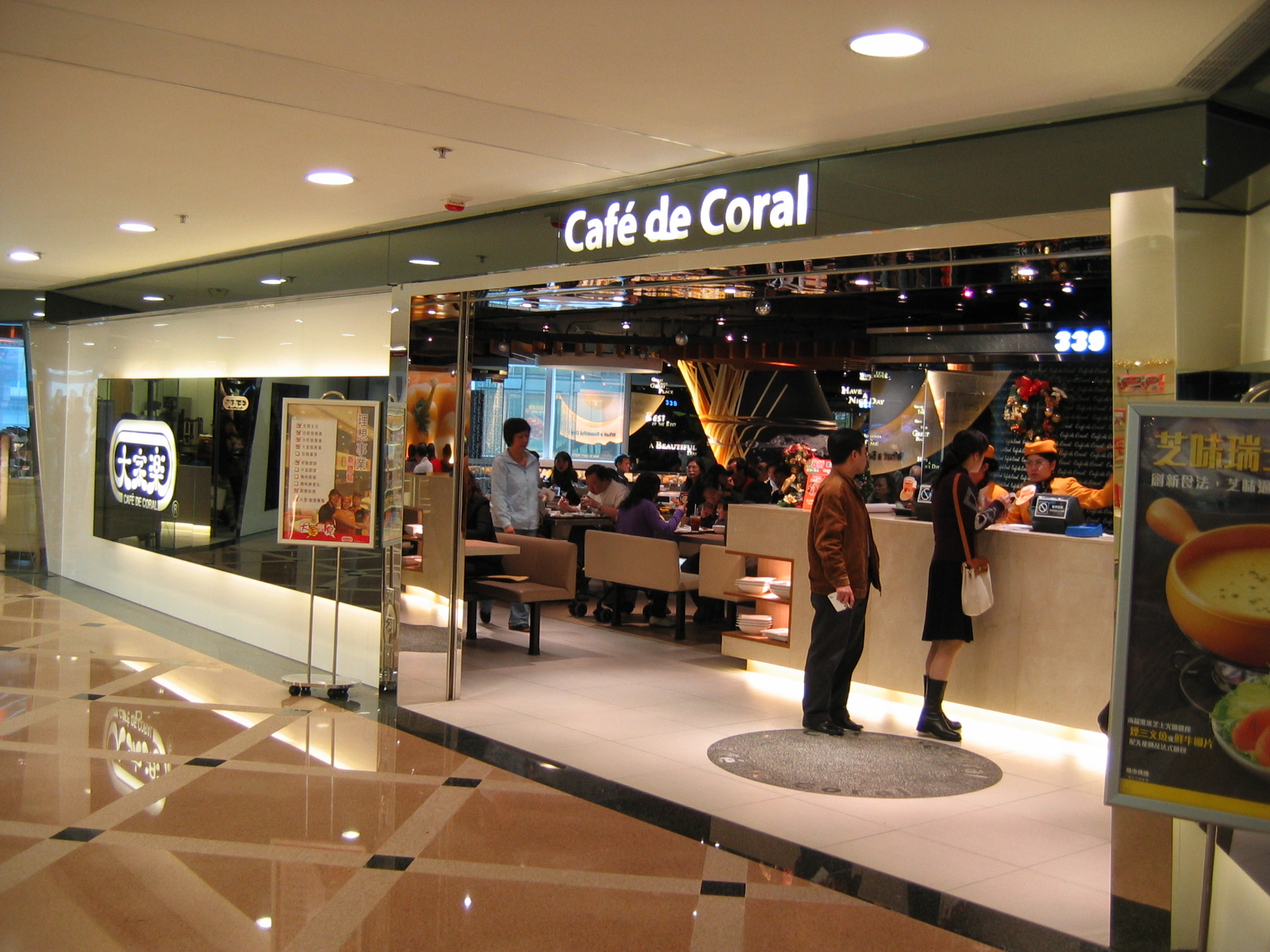
A Café de Coral fast food restaurant

Café de Coral is a fast-food restaurant chain that serves both Chinese and Western food at a budget price. Established in 1968 in Causeway Bay, Café de Coral operates over 100 locations in the Hong Kong and 24 locations in China. As of September 2019, the group had 165 Café de Coral restaurants.

=== The Spaghetti House ===
The Spaghetti House is a specialty restaurant chain that serves Hong Kong-style Italian cuisine and is positioned as a mid-market chain that is family- and tourist-friendly. Established in 1979, The Spaghetti House operates more than 30 locations in Hong Kong, Macau, and Southern China.

=== Ah Yee Leng Tong ===
Ah Yee Leng Tong is a specialty restaurant chain that serves home-style Chinese soup and a variety of Cantonese dishes. It is also known for its XO sauce. Its restaurants, which average 250 m^{2}, fuse both traditional and modern furnishings and appeal to both locals and tourists. As of 2007, the only location is at Hong Kong International Airport.

=== Bravo le Café ===
Bravo le Café is a quick-service restaurant chain that offers a mix of Western, Chinese, and Japanese food in a bistro setting designed to appeal to "young and upwardly mobile executives." Currently, the three locations of Bravo le Café are in Hong Kong: the International Finance Centre, Central, and Hong Kong International Airport.

=== Super Super Congee & Noodles ===
Super Super Congee & Noodles is a fast-food chain serving congee and various noodle dishes. As of March 2006, 50 locations were in Hong Kong, including two in Tsing Yi and one in Wong Tai Sin.

=== MiXian Sense ===
MiXian Sense is a specialty restaurant chain that serves its own special Sichuan spiced tomato soup rice noodles, with other choices of sweet tomato soup rice noodles and the classic pork bone broth soups and Sichuan spice soup rice noodles. First established in Ching Yi in 2012, it has now expanded all over Hong Kong in 16 locations.

=== Oliver's Super Sandwich ===
Oliver's Super Sandwich was introduced to Hong Kong in 1987 and was rebranded in 2012 by Cafe de Coral. This brand mainly serves freshly made sandwiches, light pasta, and steamed potatoes topped with mixes of eggs and salmon.

=== Other brands ===
Other brands include Little Onion, The Cup, 360 Series, ZAKKA, Shanghai Lao Lao, and Don Don Tei.

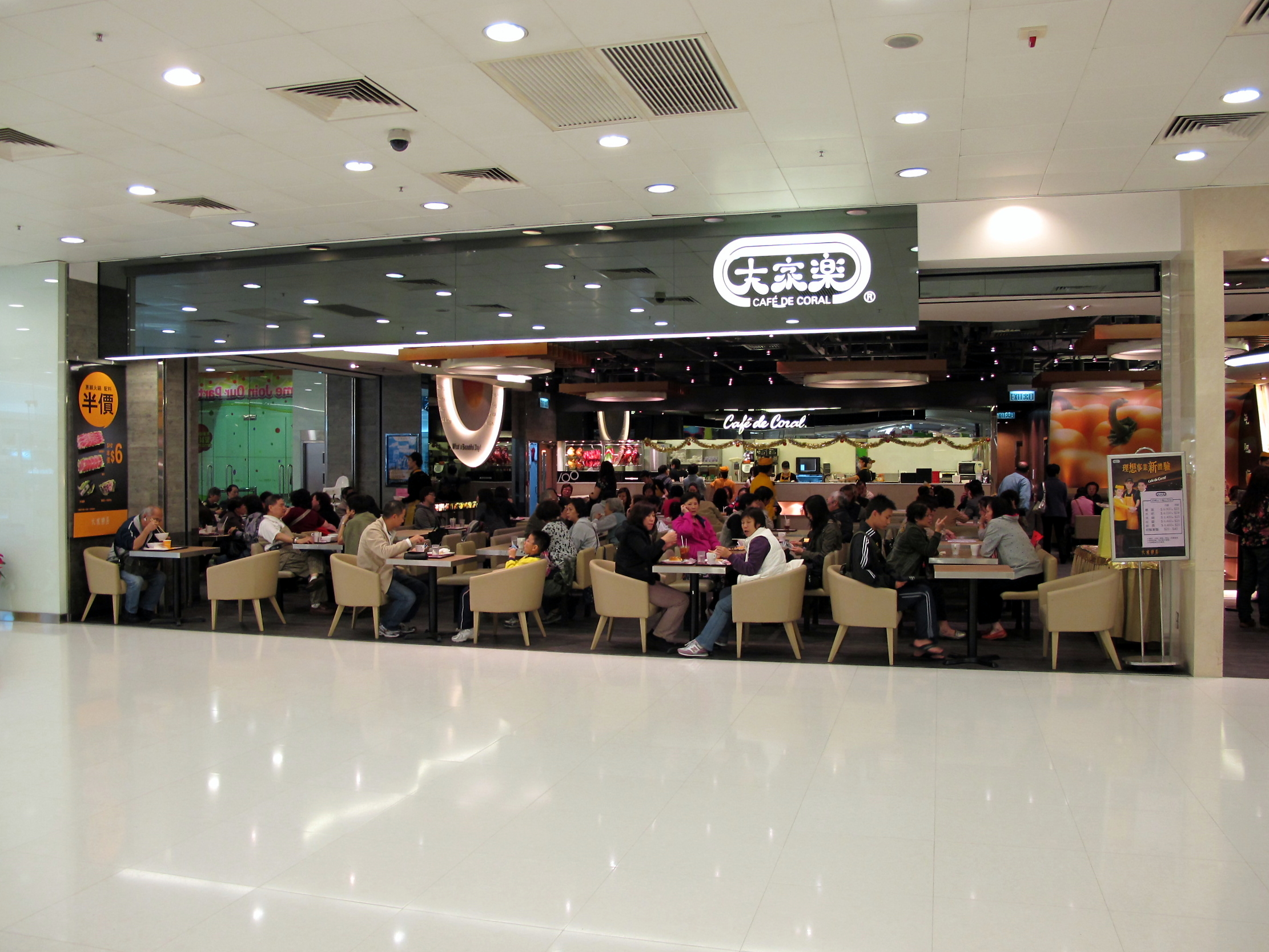
Entrance of the store in Uptown Plaza

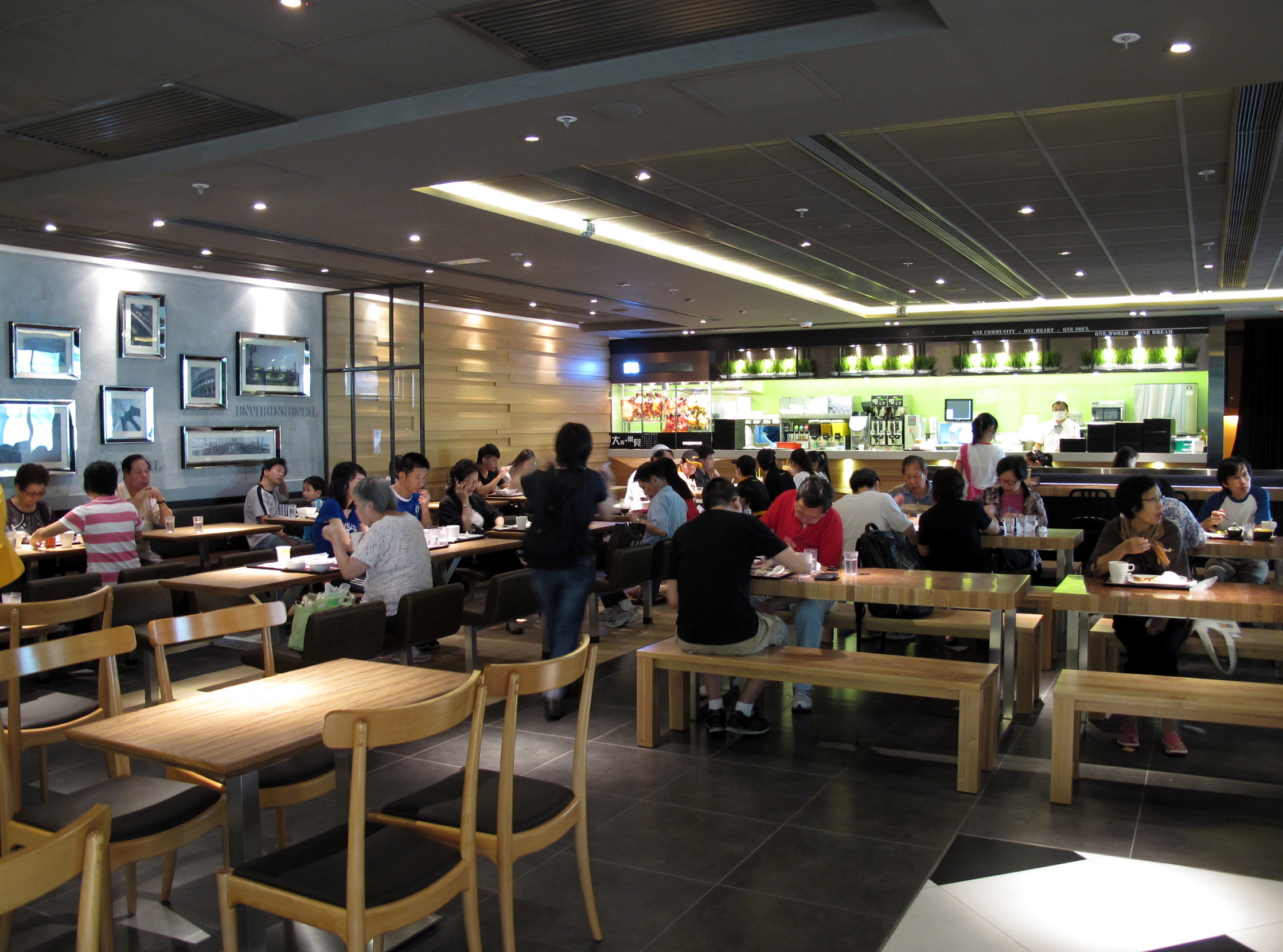
Interior of the store in New Town Plaza with the older 5th generation design

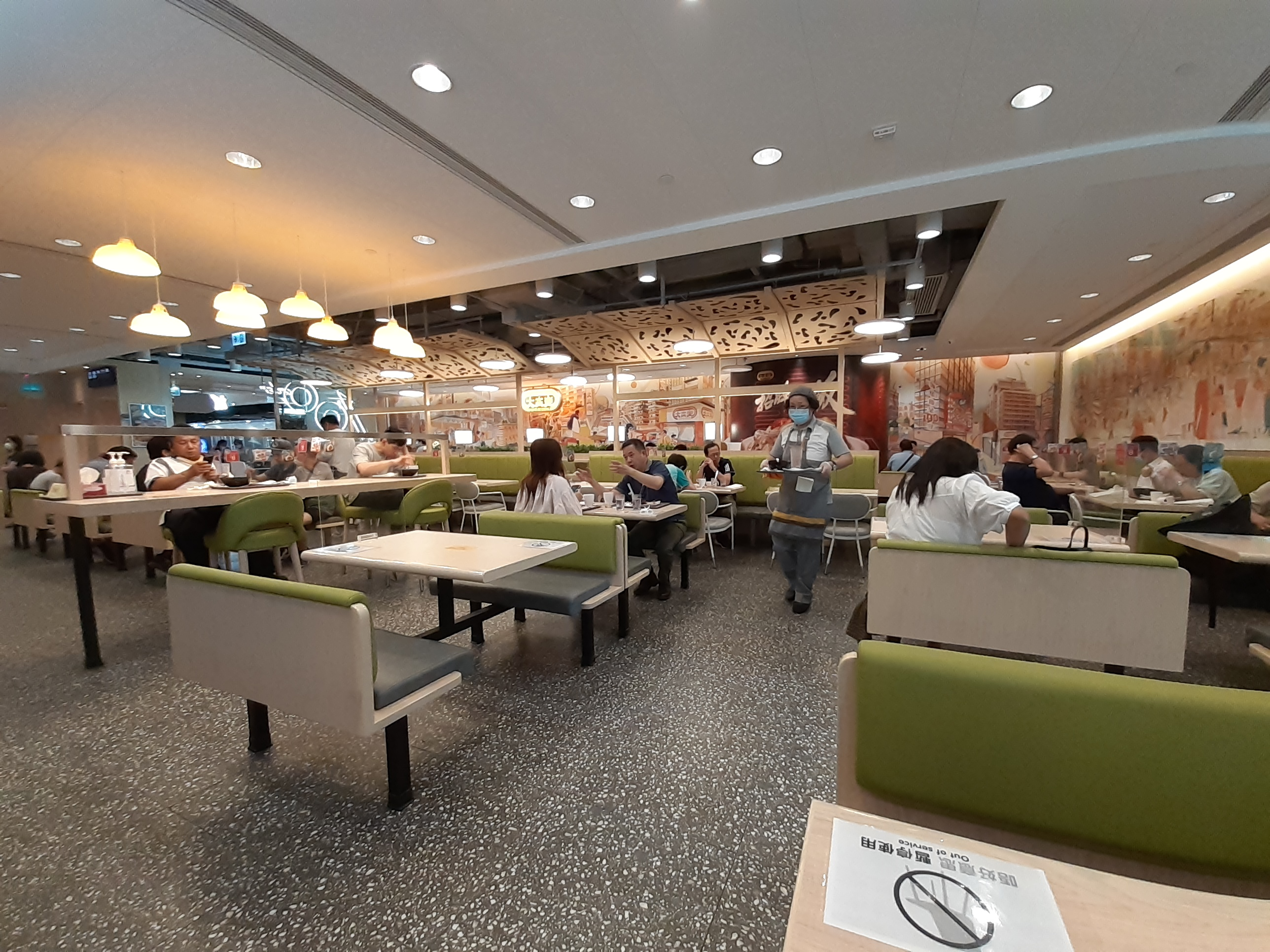
Interior of the store in LOHAS park with the newer 6th generation design

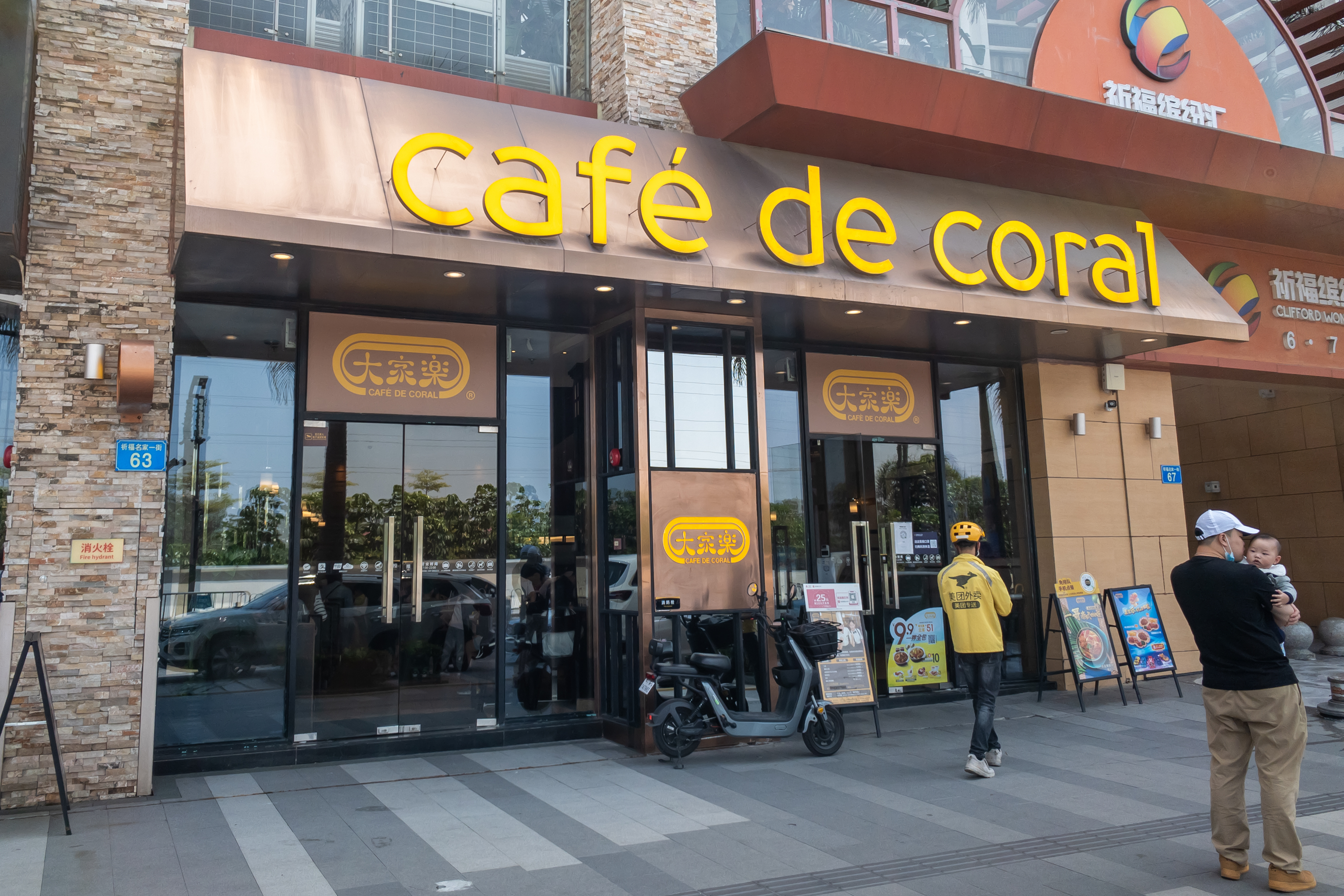
Exterior of the store in Clifford Estates in China

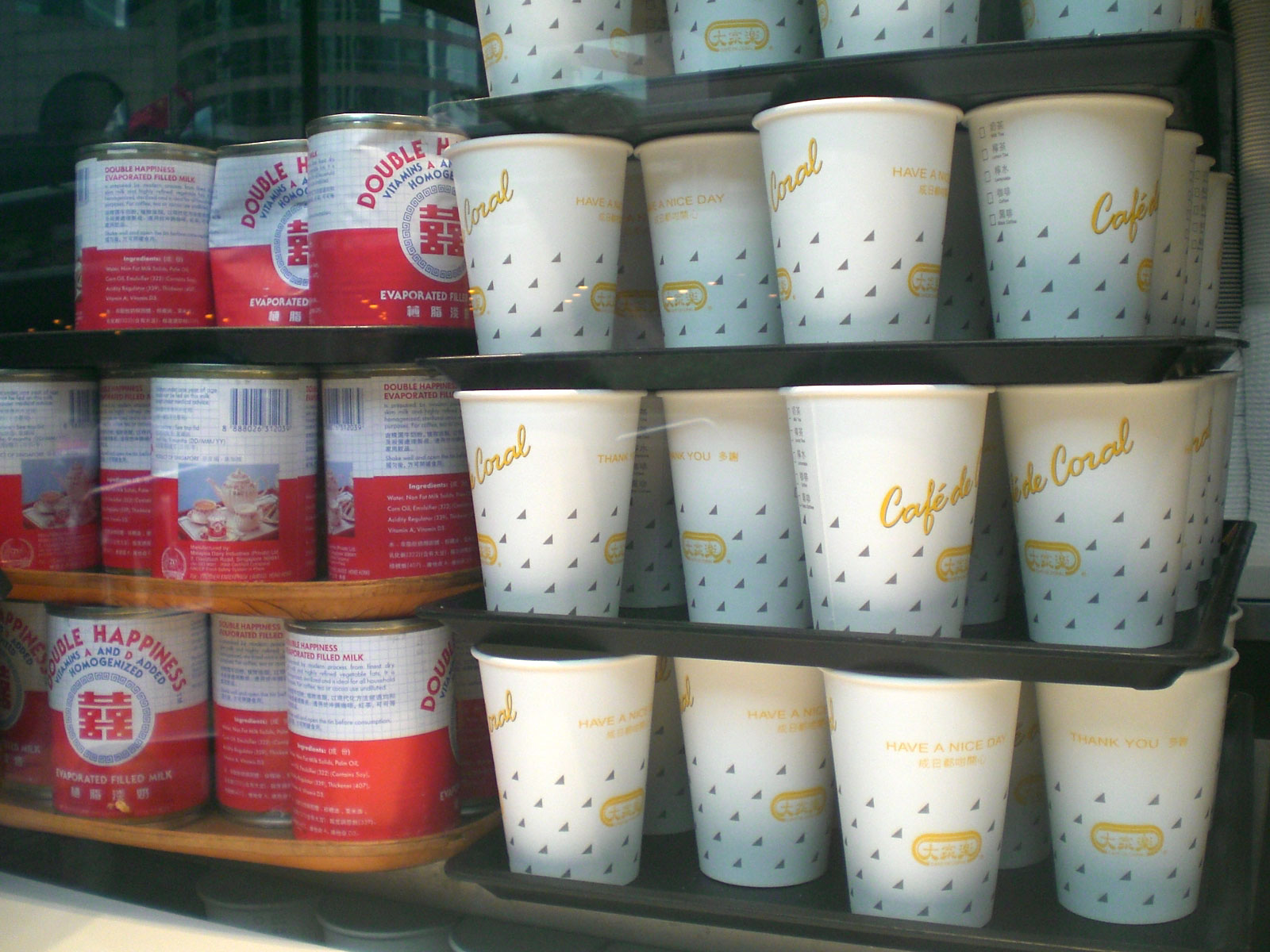
Stacks of pre-made milk tea

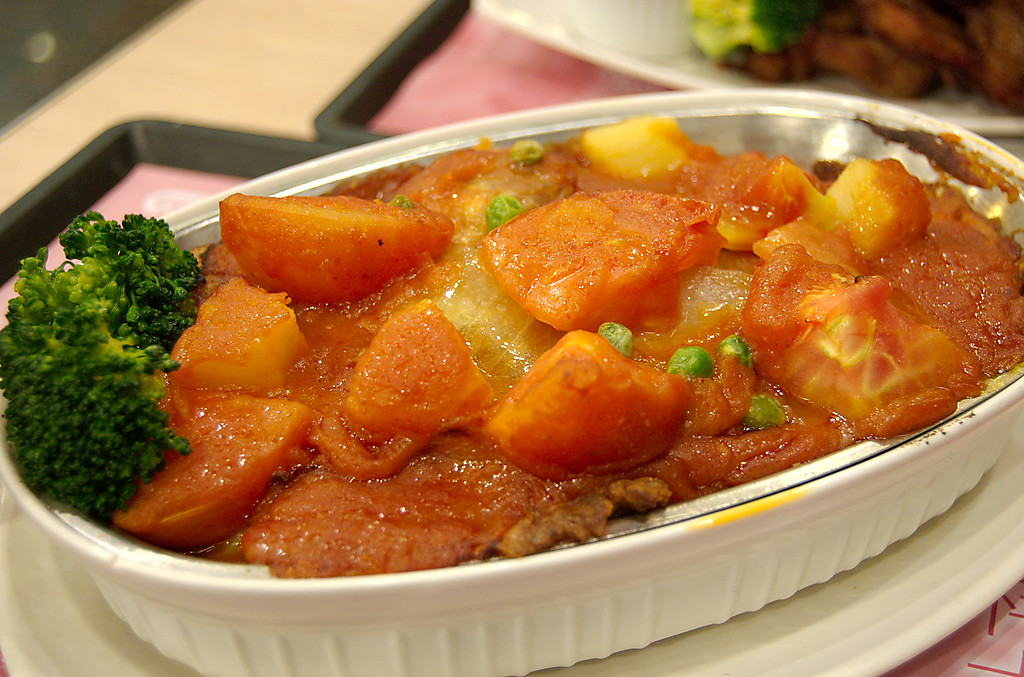
Baked Pork Chop Rice

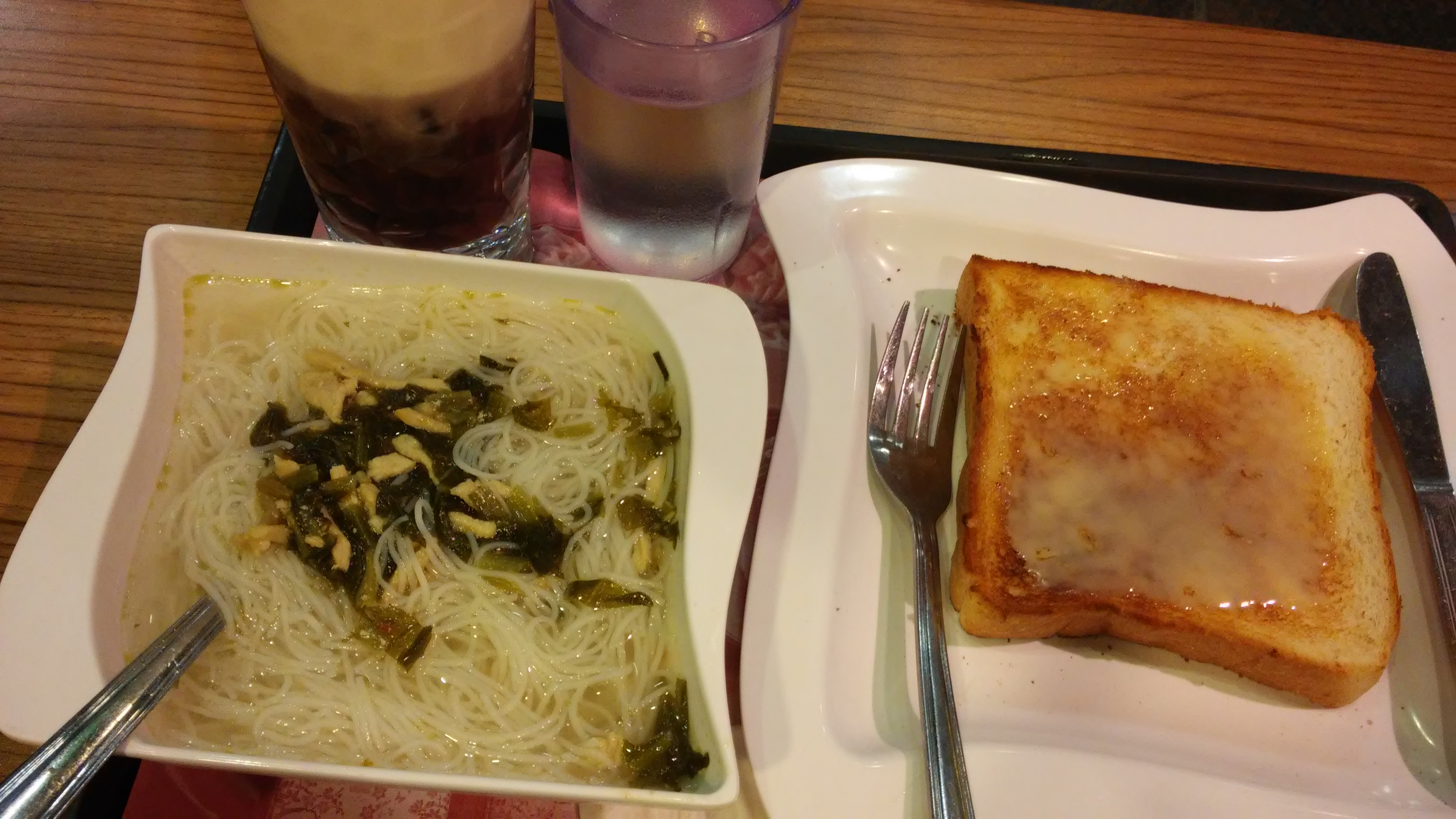
Afternoon tea meal

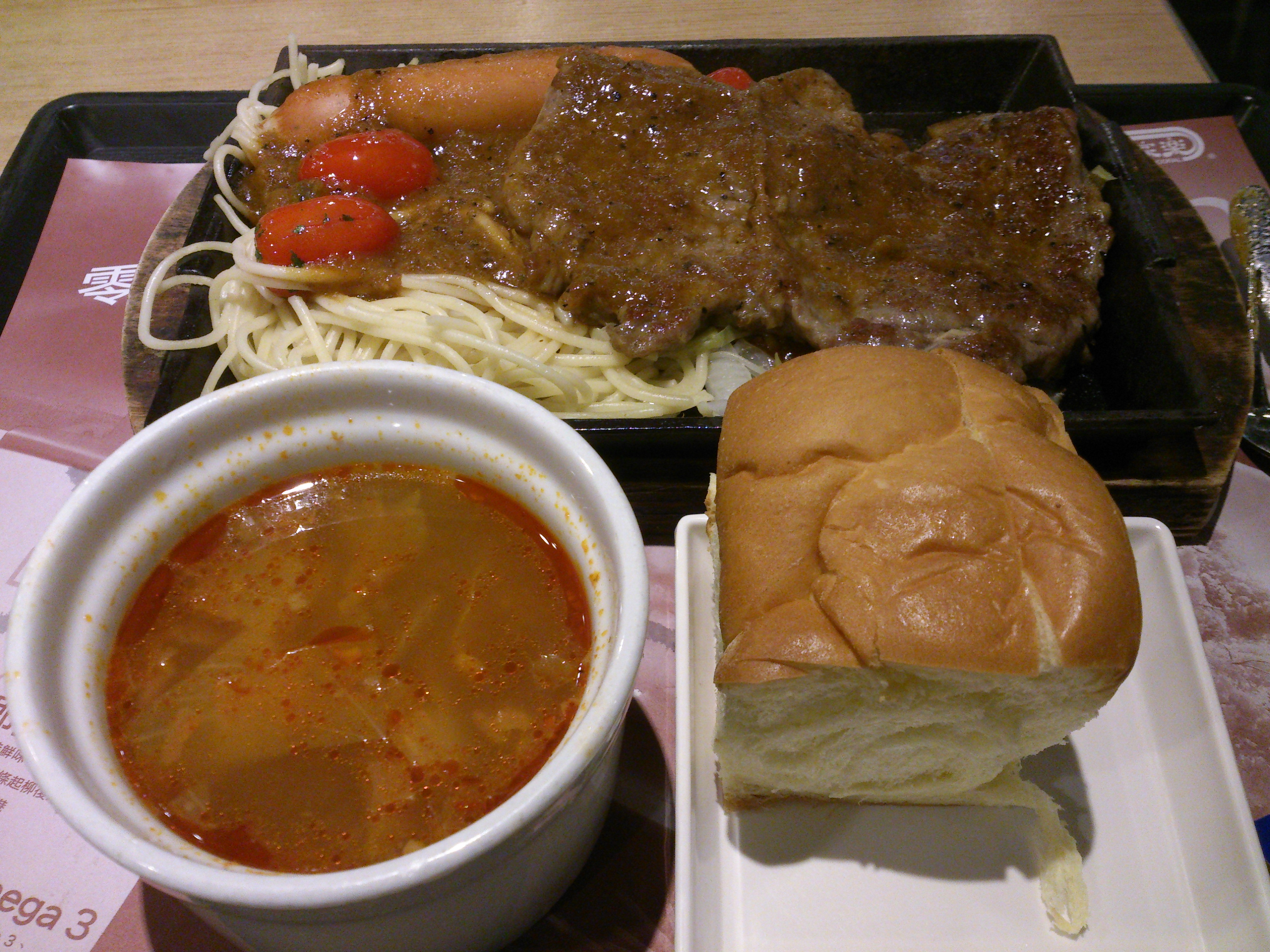
Steak set served during dinner session

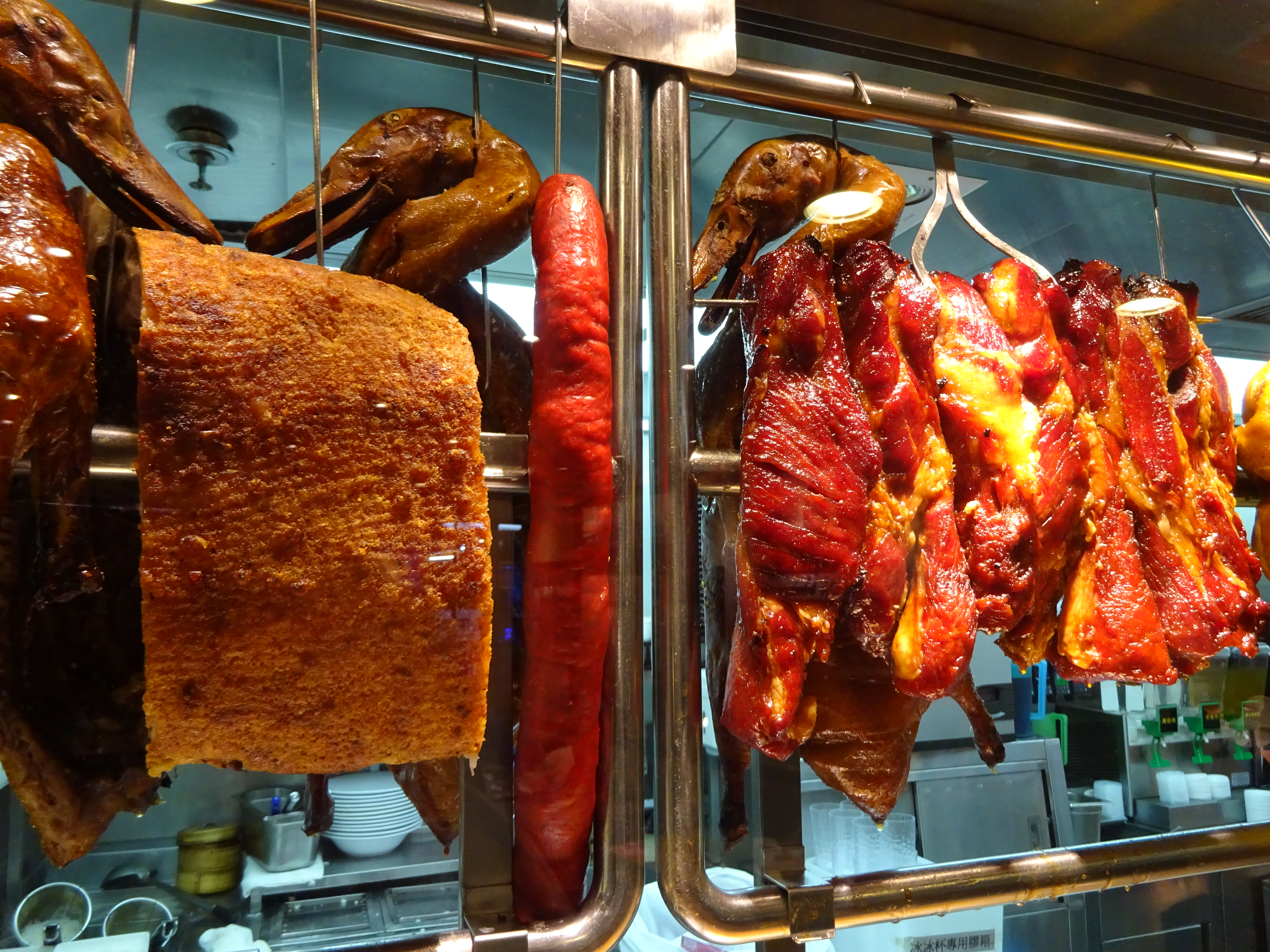
Roasted selection

== Wage controversy ==
When Hong Kong's minimum wage law was passed in July 2010, Café de Coral raised its average salary from HK$22.4/hr to $33/hr to satisfy the law's requirements. During the process, though, it stopped paying its employees for lunch breaks. Their decision led to public backlash and the Hong Kong Confederation of Trade Unions threatened to start a public boycott. Three days before the boycott was to begin, Café de Coral reversed its decision and resumed paying its employee for lunch breaks while still giving them the pay raise.

== See also ==
- Hong Kong cuisine
