= Wetzel's Pretzels =

American restaurant chain

Wetzel's Pretzels Franchise, LLC

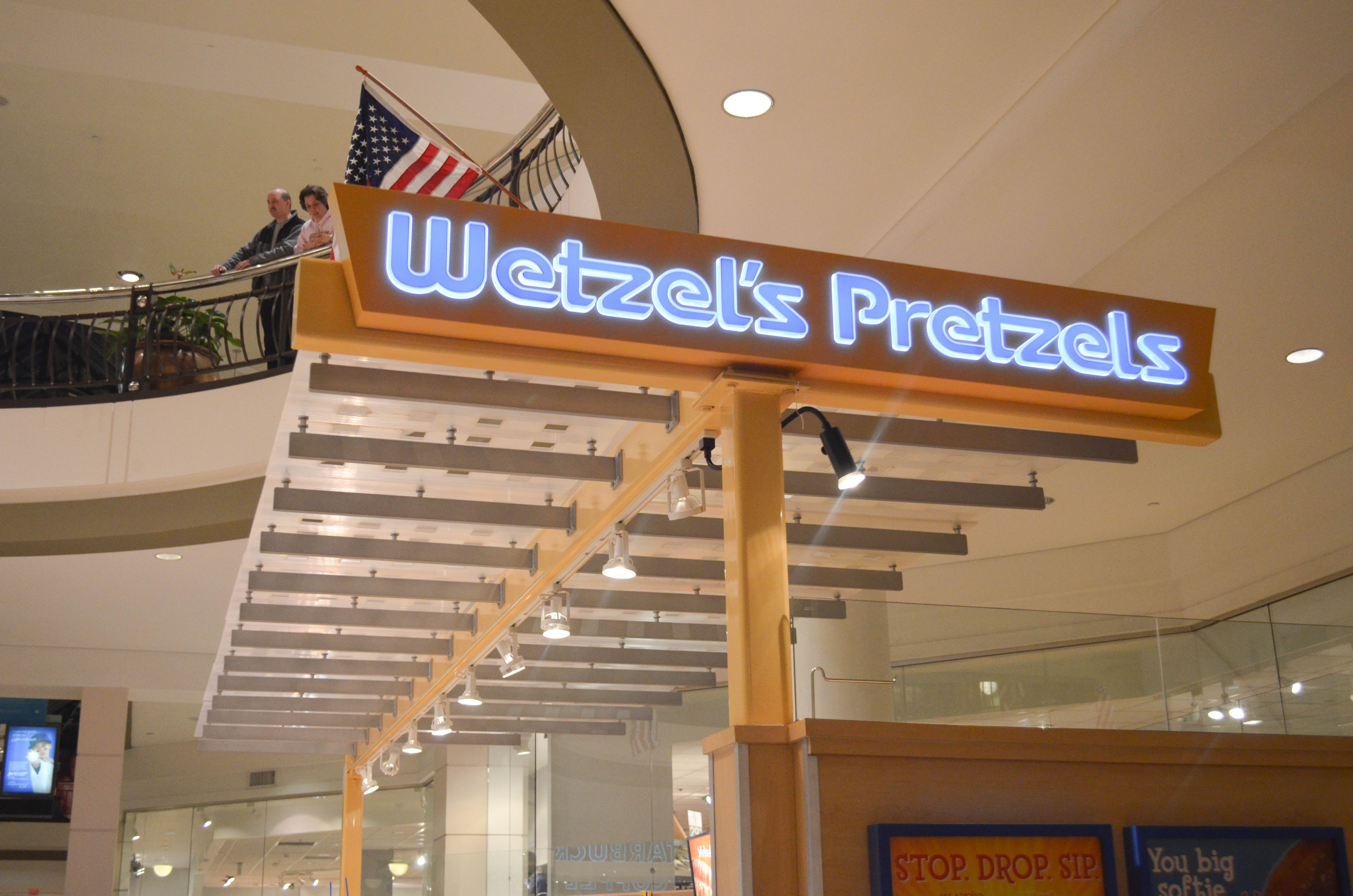
- Wetzel's Pretzels, Tysons Corner Center
- Trade name: Wetzel's Pretzels
- Type: Subsidiary
- Industry: Food and beverage Pretzel Shop
- Genre: Quick service
- Founded: 1994; 32 years ago South Bay Galleria, Redondo Beach, California, U.S.
- Founder: Rick Wetzel; Bill Phelps
- Headquarters: Scottsdale, Arizona, US
- Number of locations: 370 (2023)
- Key people: Jennifer Schuler, CEO
- Products: Pretzels
- Revenue: US$245 million (US, 2022)
- Number of employees: 2,000 (2021)
- Parent: Independent (1994–2007); Levine Leichtman Capital Partners Inc. (2007–2016); CenterOak Partners LLC (2016–2022); MTY Food Group (2022-present)
- Website: www.wetzels.com

Wetzel's Pretzels is an American chain of fast-food restaurants, specializing in pretzels and hot dogs. The chain has more than 370 locations across the United States, Canada, Central America, Southeast Asia, and formerly in Finland. The chain is mostly located in shopping malls, airports, theme parks, stadiums, and food trucks. The company is headquartered in Pasadena, California.

== History ==
Wetzel's Pretzels was founded in 1994 by Rick Wetzel and Bill Phelps in Pasadena, California. The chain's first location opened that year at the South Bay Galleria in nearby Redondo Beach. Its name was inspired by childhood taunts used by Wetzel's classmates.

In 1997, Wetzel and Phelps took on multiple investors, including John Davis and Gary L. Wilson. Wilson's connections to Disney paved the way for the chain to open locations at Disneyland and Walt Disney World.

Los Angeles-based private equity firm Levine Leichtman Capital Partners Inc. bought a majority stake in the company in 2007 for an undisclosed amount. Phelps still owns a 20% share, while Wetzel holds a smaller stake.

In October 2016, Levine Leichtman Capital Partners sold majority stake to Dallas-based private equity firm CenterOak Partners LLC. after holding the majority stake for 9 years.

In 2019, Phelps was succeeded as CEO by Jennifer Schuler.

In December 2022 Wetzel's Pretzels was acquired by MTY Food Group for $207 million.

== Menu ==
=== Food ===
Wetzel's menu is centered around its namesake pretzels along with hot dogs and lemonade. Their signature pretzels come in various flavors such as the Wetzel's Original (salted or unsalted), cinnamon sugar, pepperoni and more. Guests can also choose Bitz, more snackable pretzel bites, available in Original, Cinn-a-bitz or Pizza Bitz (with pepperoni). Other pretzel items range from the full-sized Wetzel Dog, an all-beef hot dog wrapped in pretzel or Dog Bites and Cheesy Dog Bites, the bite-sized iteration.

=== Beverages ===
Wetzel's is known for its fresh and frozen lemonades, which are available in original and strawberry flavors. They also offer a variety of other drinks such as granitas and were the first restaurant in the snack category to introduce boba popping pearls to the menu, with flavors like Cherry and Mango.
