= Stanley Ma =

Canadian businessman

- Born: 1950 (age 75–76); Hong Kong
- Occupation: Businessman
- Years active: 1979–present
- Known for: Founder and owner of MTY Group

Stanley Ma (born in Hong Kong in 1950) is a Canadian businessman and founder, chairman, and owner of MTY Food Group that owns a wide variety of food brands and sells fast food chain outlets. In 2023, the company is behind more than 80 brands, with over 7000 locations worldwide.

== Career ==
Ma was born into a family with manufacturing, real estate, and retail sales businesses in Hong Kong. He immigrated to Canada in 1968 and established himself in Montreal, where he took his first job as a dishwasher. In 1979, he opened his first restaurant in Laval, Quebec called Le Paradis du Pacifique that served a Polynesian menu.

In 1983, he launched his chain of Chinese food under the brand name Tiki Ming in Montreal.

In 1997, he founded MTY Food Group and served as its CEO until November 2, 2018. To this day, he remains the largest shareholder in the company, and holds the role of President and Chairman of the Board.

== Family ==
Ma is married to Claude St-Pierre, who held several positions within the company, and is currently a board member and major shareholder. They have 3 children. Their daughter, Katherine Ma, currently holds the role of VP Procurement & Sustainability and Chair of ESG at MTY Group.

Both Stanley and Katherine Ma have been facing negative publicity because MTY Food Group still hasn't made a public commitment to use only cage-free eggs in the company's global supply chain.

== Awards ==
Ma was named the 2010 Ernst & Young Quebec Region Entrepreneur of the Year Award and Business-to-consumer products and services category award winner.
