= Manchu Wok =

Canadian Chinese-themed fast food restaurant chain

Manchu Wok Inc.

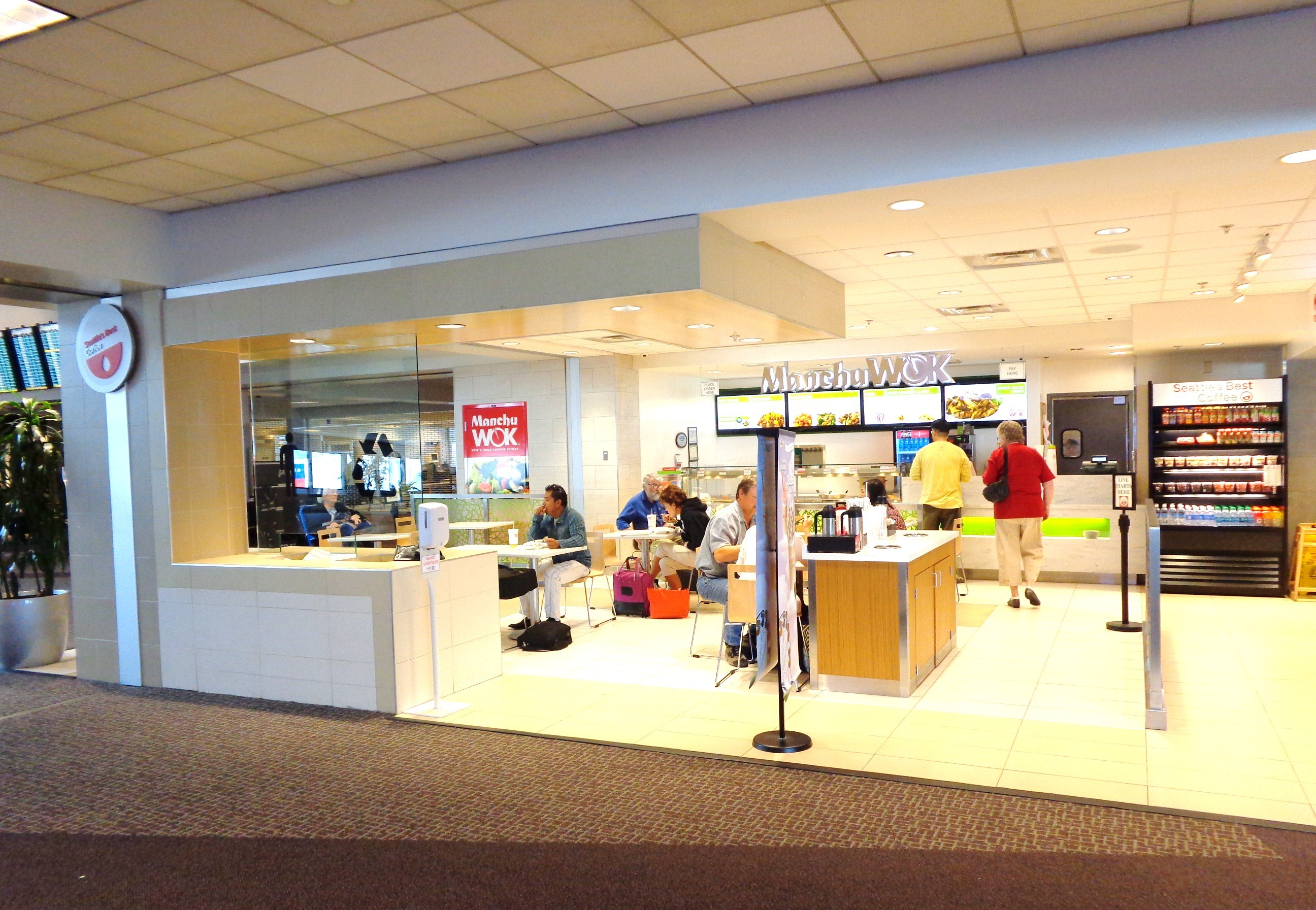
- Location at Salt Lake City International Airport
- Type: Subsidiary
- Industry: Fast food
- Founded: 1980; 46 years ago in Peterborough, Ontario, Canada
- Founders: Jack Lew
- Headquarters: Richmond Hill, Ontario, Canada
- Number of locations: 80
- Area served: Canada; United States
- Products: Canadian Chinese cuisine; Chinese-American cuisine
- Parent: MTY Food Group
- Website: www.manchuwok.com

Manchu Wok Inc. is a Canadian fast food restaurant chain specializing in Chinese-Canadian and American Chinese cuisine. Founded in Peterborough, Ontario, in 1980, the chain operates more than 80 locations, including more than 60 in Canada. Its restaurants operate in a variety of formats, including shopping malls and food courts, street-front locations, universities and airports. Manchu Wok has been owned by MTY Food Group since 2014.

Despite the chain's name, its menu does not feature traditional Manchurian cuisine. It instead consists primarily of American Chinese cuisine and Canadian Chinese cuisine.

== History ==
Manchu Wok was founded by Dr. Jack Lew in 1980, with its first restaurant opening in Peterborough, Ontario. Lew hired food service equipment consultant Alfred Grech, a Maltese immigrant, to design and help with the building of the first 33 stores.

By 1992, the chain had expanded substantially in Canada and the United States. That year, Manchu Wok was sold to Scott's Hospitality Inc. At the time of the sale, there were 113 Manchu Wok units in Canada and United States. Under new ownership, there were 237 Manchu Wok units in the United States, Canada and the United Kingdom by April 1992.

By 1996, Manchu Wok had 245 locations. That year, its parent company, Scott's Hospitality, was acquired by Laidlaw Inc.

In 2000, Laidlaw sold Manchu Wok to a group of investors headed by Ken Fowler and Hong Kong-based Café de Coral. At the time of the sale in 2000, there were 74 locations in Canada, 119 locations in the United States and 2 in Poland, making it the largest Chinese restaurant chain in Canada and the second largest in North America.

In December 2014, MTY Food Group acquired the assets of Manchu Wok, Wasabi Grill & Noodle and SenseAsian for $7.9 million. At the time the agreement was announced, the three brands operated 133 restaurants, including 114 franchised and 19 corporate-owned locations, primarily in Canada and the United States.

== International operations ==
Manchu Wok has operated restaurants in several markets outside Canada and the continental United States. By 1992, the chain had expanded to the United Kingdom, and by 2000 it operated two restaurants in Poland.

The chain later operated restaurants serving U.S. military communities overseas, including at Ramstein Air Base in Germany. The brand opened another franchise in Dubai Hills Mall, Dubai.

== In popular culture ==
In May 2026, Canadian rapper Drake featured the Manchu Wok logo on a custom fur coat worn in the music video for "Slap This City", alongside the logos of other Canadian Brands; Canadian Tire, Molson Canadian, Sleep Country Canada, and Royal Bank of Canada.

== See also ==
- MTY Food Group
- List of Canadian restaurant chains
- List of Chinese restaurants
