= Papa Murphy's =

Business based in Vancouver, Washington, United States

Papa Murphy's Holdings, Inc.
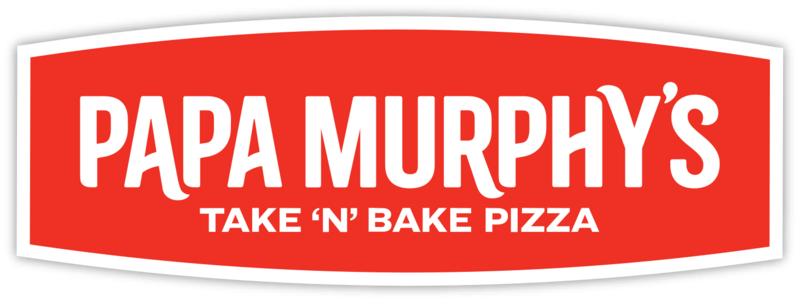

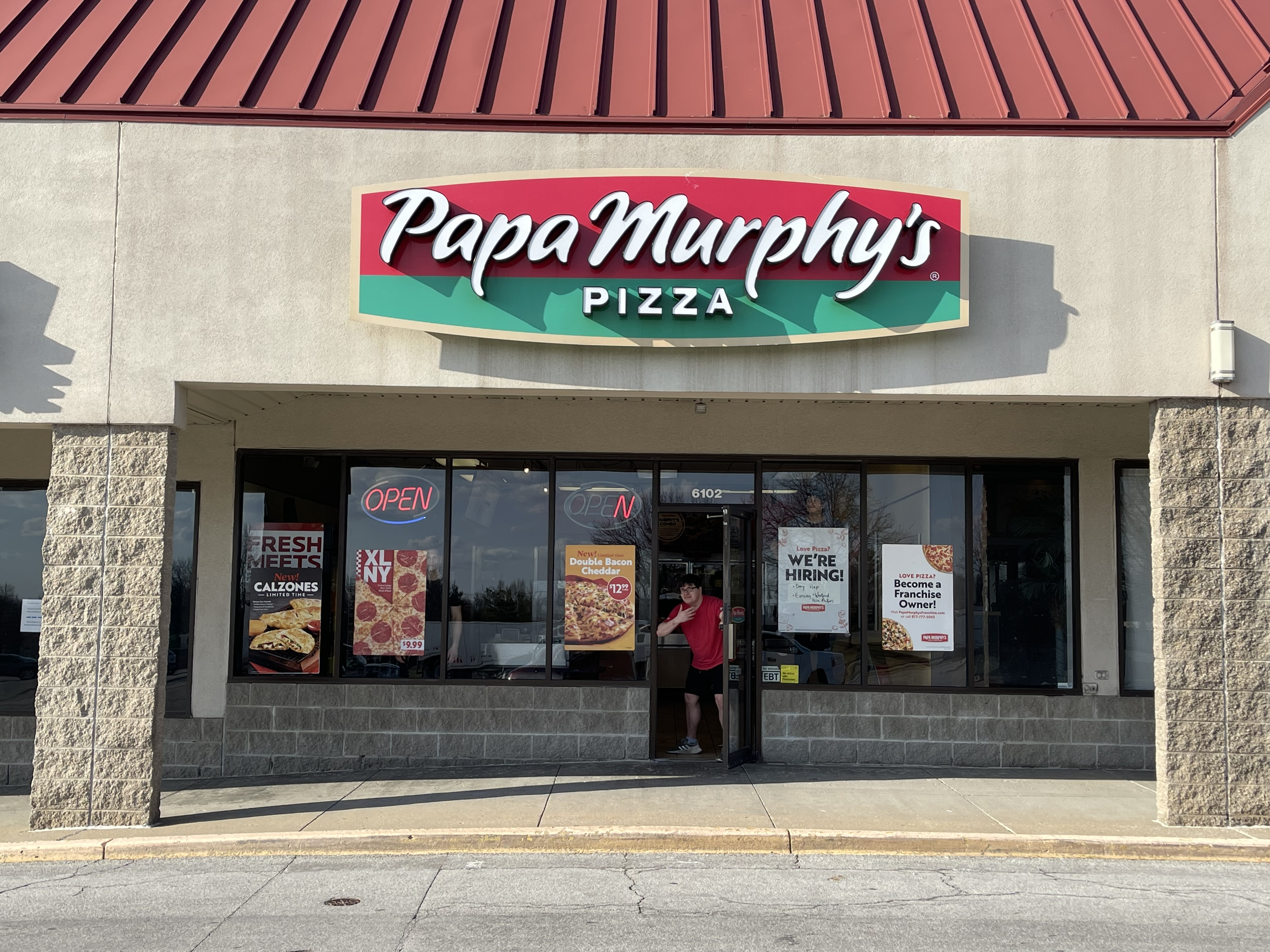
- A Papa Murphy’s located in Kansas City, Missouri (Pictured in 2023)
- Trade name: Papa Murphy's
- Type: Subsidiary
- Industry: Fast food restaurants
- Founded: 1981; 45 years ago
- Headquarters: Vancouver, Washington
- Number of locations: 1,300+
- Key people: Eric Lefebvre (CEO)
- Products: Pizza
- Revenue: $800 million
- Parent: MTY Food Group
- Website: papamurphys.com

Papa Murphy's Holdings, Inc. is a take-and-bake pizza company based in Vancouver, Washington. It began in 1995 as the merger of two local take-and-bake pizza companies: Papa Aldo's Pizza (founded in 1981) and Murphy's Pizza (founded in 1984). The company and its franchisees operate more than 1,300 outlets in the United States, Canada, and the United Arab Emirates. In April 2019, it was announced that the company would be acquired by MTY Food Group for $190 million.

== History ==
The chain of pizzerias traces its history back to 1981, when the Papa Aldo's Pizza chain was founded in Hillsboro, Oregon. Three years later, Murphy's Pizza chain began operating in Petaluma, California. Both chains were later acquired and consolidated by Terry Collins into Papa Murphy's. The chain was incorporated as Papa Murphy's International, Inc. In 2003, Papa Murphy's was voted "Best Pizza Chain in America" by Restaurants and Institutions magazine. The company was merged with PMI Holdings, Inc. in 2004.

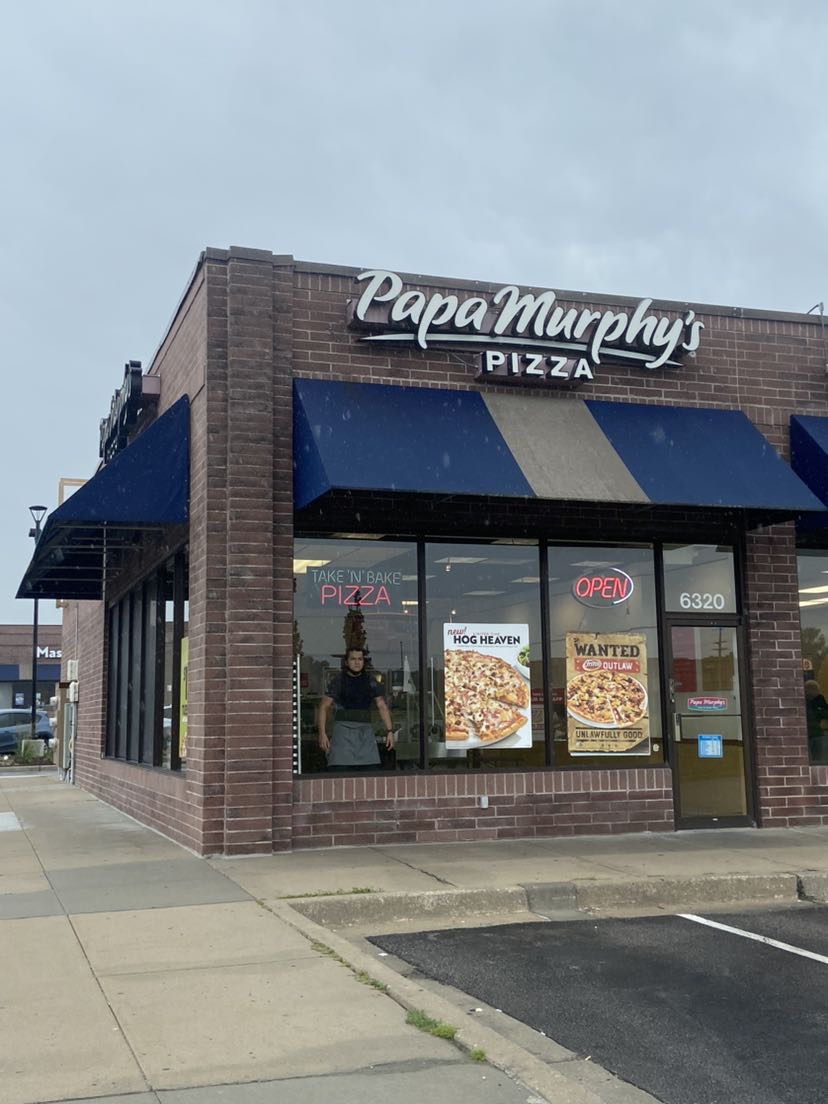
A Papa Murphy's located in Parkville, Missouri. Pictured in 2021.

In 2010, the chain sold out to Lee Equity Partners of New York City. Sales for the chain totaled $702 million in 2011, which grew to $800 million in 2012 from 1,350 outlets. Reuters reported in 2013 that Papa Murphy's New York parent, Lee Equity Partners, was preparing a public offering for the take-and-bake pizza chain. Official plans for the IPO were announced in March 2014.

Papa Murphy's (FRSH) was added to the Nasdaq May 2, 2014, raising $64.1 million in shares.

Following a loss in the third quarter of 2016, the company announced that it would launch its first national advertising campaign in 2017.

By 2017–2018, the franchisor was struggling, dipping in and out of losses and profitability. In May 2019, it was taken over by Canadian private food conglomerate MTY Food Group, and removed from the NASDAQ.In October 2022, Papa Murphy's was sued in a class action lawsuit alleging the company had been secretly wiretapping the private conversations of everyone who had communicated via the company's online chat feature.

In July 2026, MTY Food Group, announced plans to close between 45 and 50 underperforming corporate-owned locations over the following six to nine months. The restructuring followed a detailed performance review of the company's corporate-owned portfolio, which revealed that the selected locations had collectively generated over CAD 10 million in losses during the preceding 12 months. The closures primarily targeted corporate stores that MTY Food Group had repossessed two years prior in an unsuccessful turnaround attempt. This downsizing initiative reflects broader pizza industry trends in 2026, driven by rising operational costs and shifting consumer spending, which also prompted significant store rationalizations by competitors like Pizza Hut and Papa Johns.

== Operations ==
Orders are available by walk-in, online order, or call-in. Some stores have a drive-thru window where customers can pick up online and call-in orders. As part of the take-and-bake concept, the pizzas are made at the store but are not baked there. According to Nation's Restaurant News, take-and-bake pizzerias typically have lower costs because they require less restaurant space and equipment. As a result, they are often able to undercut the national pizza giants. Papa Murphy's also offers salads, dessert items, and soft drinks in various sizes.

A Papa Murphy's employee creating a Papa's Favorite pizza

== See also ==
- List of pizza chains of the United States
