= MTY Food Group =

Canadian restaurant franchisor and operator

MTY Food Group Inc.

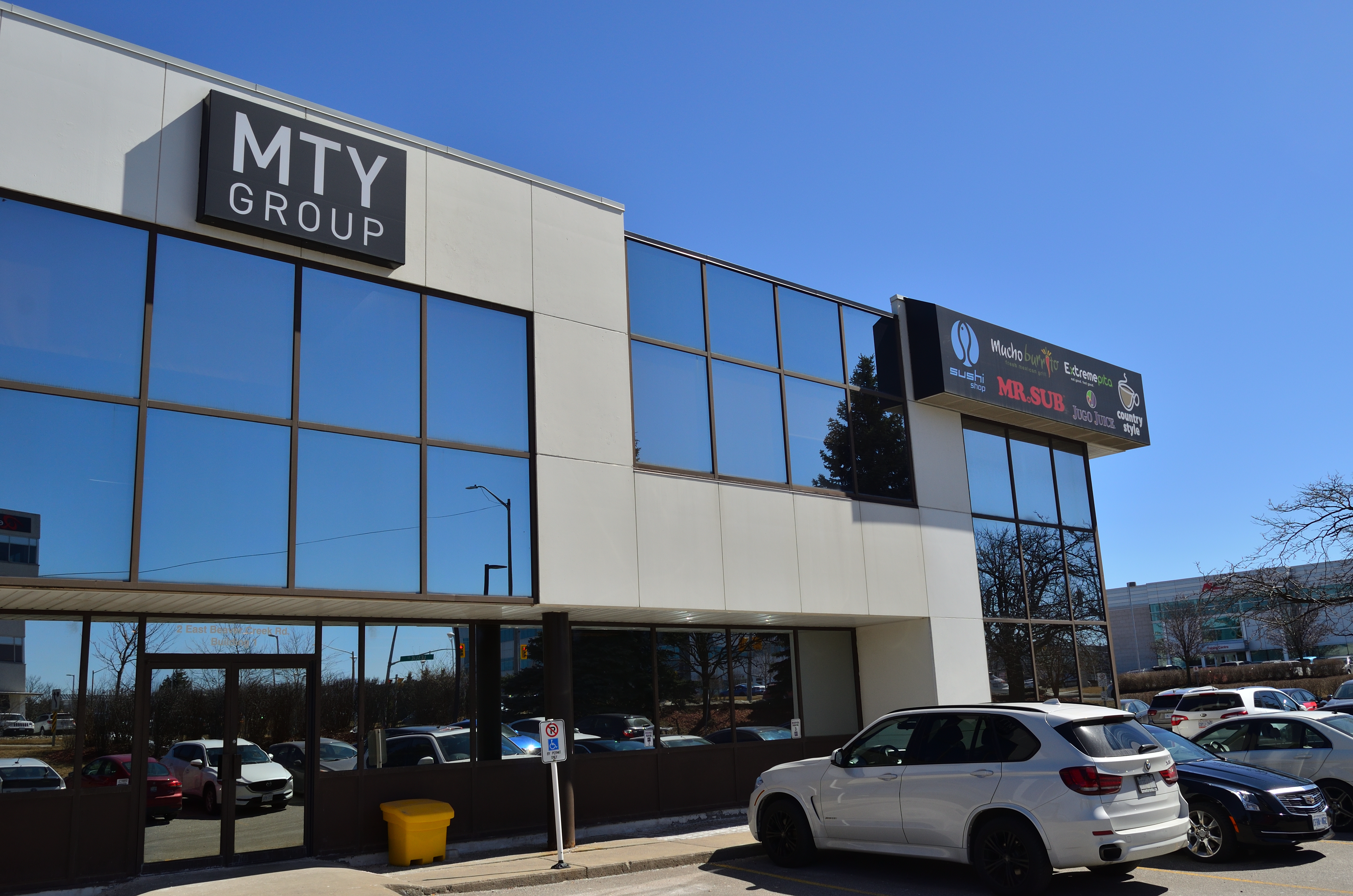
- MTY Food Group office in Richmond Hill
- Formerly: Golden Sky Resources (1986–1994); Golden Sky Ventures International (1994–2000); iNsu Innovations Group (2000–2003)
- Type: Public
- Traded as: TSX: MTY
- Founded: 1979; 47 years ago as Le Paradis du Pacifique
- Founder: Stanley Ma
- Headquarters: Saint-Laurent, Quebec, Canada
- Number of locations: ▼6,719 (2021)
- Area served: Worldwide
- Key people: Victor Mandel ( CEO); Renée St-Onge ( CFO)
- Brands: List: Allô! Mon Coco; America's Taco Shop; Baja Fresh Mexican Grill; Baton Rouge; Ben & Florentine; Big Smoke Burger; Blimpie; Built Custom Burgers; Buns Master; Café Dépôt; Casa Grecque; Cold Stone Creamery; COOP Wicked Chicken; Country Style; Cultures; Dagwoods Sandwiches and Salads; Extreme Pita; Frullati Café & Bakery; Giorgio Ristorante; Grabbagreen; Johnnie's New York Pizzeria; Jugo Juice; Kim Chi; Koryo Korean Barbeque; Koya Japan; Küto Comptoir à Tartares; La Boite Verte; La Crémière; La Diperie; La Salsa Fresh Mexican Grill; Madisons New York Grill & Bar; Manchu Wok; Maui Wowi; Mmmuffins; Mr. Souvlaki; Mr. Sub; Mucho Burrito; Muffin Plus; NrGize Lifestyle Café; O'Burger; Panini Pizza Pasta; Papa Murphy's; Pinkberry; Pizza Delight; Planet Smoothie; PurBlendz; Ranch One; Rollerz; Samurai Sam's Teriyaki Grill; Scores; South Street Burger; Steak Frites St-Paul; Sukiyaki; Surf City Squeeze; Sushi Go; Sushi Shop; Sushi-Man; SweetFrog; Taco Time; Tandori; Tasti D-Lite; TCBY; Thaï Express; ThaïZone; The Counter Custom Burgers; The Great Steak & Potato Company; The Works Gourmet Burger Bistro; Tiki-Ming; Timothy's World Coffee; Tosto; Toujours Mikes; Turtle Jack's Muskoka Grill; Tutti Frutti; Valentine; Van Houtte; Vanellis; Vie & Nam; Villa Madina; Wasabi Grill & Noodle; Yuzu Sushi
- Revenue: ▲CA$551.9 million (2021): ▲$3.63 billion (2021; system-wide sales)
- Operating income: ▲$382.6 million (2021)
- Net income: ▲$169.3 million (2021)
- Total assets: ▼$1.90 billion (2021)
- Total equity: ▲$648.9 million (2021)
- Divisions: MTY Tiki Ming Enterprises; Taco Time Canada Inc. (founded as taco foods ltd., 1977); Country Style Food Services Holdings Inc. (founded 1962); Yogen Fruz Canada Inc. (founded 1986)
- Subsidiaries: Kahala Brands; BBQ Holdings
- Website: www.mtygroup.com

MTY Food Group Inc. is a Canadian franchisor and operator of numerous casual dining, fast casual, and quick service restaurants operating under more than 70 brand names, some of them through wholly owned subsidiaries. Headquartered in Quebec, in the Montreal borough of Saint-Laurent, the number of outlets carrying MTY brands reached 5,500 in 2017. Stanley Ma is the group founder, President and CEO. Some of MTY Food Group's brands include Thaï Express, Country Style, Groupe Valentine, Vanelli's, Extreme Pita, Taco Time, Yogen Früz, and the Canadian branch of TCBY. MTY's American division is Kahala Brands, which it acquired in 2016.

Since opening the first Tiki Ming restaurant in 1984, MTY launched ten brands and acquired more than twenty others. Four of the restaurant chains—Vanelli's, Caferama, Sukiyaki, and La Cremiere—also operate in the Middle East. There used to be a computer and technology division named Gold Tech Computer Systems Ltd., which was sold to accountant Murad Armutlu in 2003, serving as CFO of MTY (2000-2003) who then absorbed Gold Tech's resources for record keeping and financial managing.

In 2017, most of its restaurants were located in shopping malls and cinema food courts with others located in convenience stores. But by 2019, only 22 percent of its stores were in food courts. The company owes much of its growth to corporate takeovers (in 2013, 80 percent of the company's revenue growth was attributable to acquisitions). It operates in Canada, United Arab Emirates, Jordan and Morocco and in 2009 revenue from franchise fees increased 75 percent. It joined the Toronto Stock Exchange as a debt-free company in June 2010. Prior to this it traded on the TSX Venture Exchange for 15 years under four different names.

Of its 2,700 Canadian units, 98 percent are franchisee owned.

== History ==
In 1979, 29 year old Stanley Ma (Chinese: 馬托伊; pinyin: Mǎ Tuō Yī) opened a restaurant called Le Paradis du Pacifique on St. Martin Blvd in Laval, 11 years after he arrived in Canada from Hong Kong. In 1984, he opened the first of 56 Tiki Ming restaurants in Canada in Mount Royal's Rockland Centre. In 1986, the predecessor company was incorporated as Golden Sky Resources Inc. and publicly traded on the Vancouver Stock Exchange (now the TSX Venture Exchange) in February 1989. The company first went public in 1995, there were 70 locations at the time. The name of the company was later changed to Golden Sky Ventures International Inc. in 1994, then to iNsu Innovations Group Inc. in 2000, and then to its current name MTY Food Group Inc. in 2003, with the acronym based on the consonants of Stanley's Chinese name. It moved from the TSX Venture Exchange to the TSX exchange under the symbol MTY in May 2010 one year after it acquired Country Style Food Services.

Previous logo used from 2011–2016

On November 30, 2010, the company created two new subsidiaries when it combined five former ones. Country Style Food Services Holdings Inc., Buns Master Bakery Systems Inc. and Melody Farms Specialty Foods & Equipment Limited were regrouped into one subsidiary, the other came from Mrs. Vanelli's Restaurants Limited and MTY Tiki Ming Enterprises Inc. The move improved short term cash flow by enabling it to take advantage of non-capital tax losses quicker.

On May 21, 2010, president, CEO, and chairman of MTY Food Group Stanley Ma opened the Toronto Stock Exchange.

In 2016, in a bid for faster expansion, MTY offered to buy the Quebec-based St-Hubert chain of restaurants with its rich chicken product menu. MTY's offer was rejected in favour of the purchase of St Hubert brand by Ontario-based Cara Operations.

In December 2017, however, MTY announced that it was finishing a purchase deal of Imvescor Restaurant Group Inc., a Canadian company with restaurants and food outlets under the five brands Toujours Mikes, Pizza Delight, Scores Rotisserie, Bâton Rouge, and Ben & Florentine. The purchase tag is reportedly $248 million CAD in a stock-and-cash deal, and will add another 262 existing outlets of the said brands with a reported annual sales figures of 416 million Canadian dollars. The purchase was finalized by the end of February 2018. Imvescor chairman Francois-Xavier Seigneur said joining forces with MTY creates opportunities for Imvescor shareholders from an offer he described as representing a "full and fair value." The combined company is expected to generate about $2.9 billion in annual sales.

In February 2018, MTY announced that it was acquiring two new brands, Timothy's and Mmmuffin.

== Brands ==
MTY Food Group owns or controls many restaurant brands within Canada and the United States. In some cases, MTY is a franchise operator within Canada only for chains headquartered outside of Canada such as TCBY and Yogen Früz. In all other cases, MTY owns the brand with the brand headquartered in either Montreal or Phoenix and may license to other companies outside of North America.

Year	1995	2002	2003	2004	2005	2006	2007	2008	2009	2010	2011	2012	2013	2014	2015 q2	2016
Number of locations	70	248	287	420	428	784	825	1,023	1,570	1727	1893	2251	2590	2727	2792	5488

=== Brands launched ===
Tiki-Ming, which is a Chinese restaurant based in Quebec, Canada, was the first restaurant of the franchised brands of MTY. The company was launched in 1984 two years before MTY's predecessor, Golden Sky Resources was formed. In addition to the Tiki-Ming brand, MTY has launched further fast food ethnic-based brand food chains including North American, European, Italian, Chinese, Japanese, Korean, Middle Eastern and South Asian menus.

- Sukiyaki (1988) – Japanese cuisine
- Franx Supreme (1989) – French Canadian specialties including Quebec's famous "Poutine". Chain also offers chicken nuggets, salads, made to order sandwiches, hot dogs and burgers
- Chick 'n Chick (1995) – Canadian and American chicken products, French fries and fast food
- Panini Pizza (1995) – Italian and European sandwiches, pizza
- Caférama (1999)
- Villa Madina (2003) – Arab / Middle Eastern / Mediterranean cuisine
- KimChi (2007) – Korean cuisine
- Tandori (2008) – Indian / South Asian cuisine
- O'Burger (2008) – Canadian and American burgers and sandwiches

=== Brands acquired ===
A list of notable brands acquired by MTY include:

- Baja Fresh
- Cold Stone Creamery
- Famous Dave's
- Papa Murphy's
- Pinkberry
- Planet Smoothie
- Sweet Frog
- Wetzel's Pretzels
- Manchu Wok

=== History of acquisitions ===
In April 1999, MTY acquired Fontaine Santé, a 22-unit health food quick service restaurant chain in Quebec, for an undisclosed amount. The stores were later rebranded as Veggirama and then rebranded a second time as Cultures.

Under the name iNsu Innovations, MTY acquired the brand La Crémière in November 2001, which oversaw 74 locations (all were in Quebec at the time), from Agropur Coopérative for $750,000. The acquisition, which included the Beaver Tails trade name, brought the company's system-wide sales up to $50 million.

In May 2002, MTY, then still known as iNsu Innovations Group, signed a strategic alliance agreement with Restaurants Au Vieux Duluth inc. that allows the company to franchise Au Vieux Duluth Express, a quick serve version of Laval-based Greek restaurant.

In September 2002, MTY acquired the 20-unit Croissant Plus for an undisclosed amount.

In May 2003, MTY, then known as iNsu Innovations Group, acquired 23-unit Cultures for $9.25 million.

In June 2004, MTY purchase all 105 Mrs. Vanelli's locations plus the Mrs. Vanelli's trademarks from Donato Food Corp. for an undisclosed amount. As part of the purchase agreement, MTY entered into a license agreement with a subsidiary of Donato Food Corp. to allow the Donato subsidiary to continue to manufacture and distribute "Mrs. Vanelli's" branded food products worldwide.

Thaï Express was acquired in May 2004 from Tara Fung Holding Inc. of Montreal through then-subsidiary Matoyee Enterprises Inc.

In September 2006, MTY acquired the 47 stores of Sushi Shop for $7.6 million. The previous owner of the establishment was made vice president after the deal.

In October 2006, purchased the 25-unit Koya Japan chain from the Sabbagh Family Trust of Winnipeg for over $3 million.

In June 2008, MTY inaugurated its Vietnamese cuisine concept called Vie & Nam.

In September 2008, MTY purchased Tutti Frutti for $7.3 million.

In November 2008, MTY acquired Taco Time Canada from Calgarians Ken and Aarol Pattendent for $7.9 million. Taco Time Canada held the franchise rights in Canada for Arizona-based Taco Time. MTY would later acquire Arizona-based Taco Time through the 2016 acquisition of Kahala Brands.

Country Style was acquired when it had 488 locations, in April 2009 for $7.7 million in cash and $6.9 million in debt.

In September 2010 MTY Food Group bought Groupe Valentine Inc.'s Valentine restaurant brand for $9.3 million, with Groupe Valentine becoming a subsidiary of MTY Food Group. Valentine is a Canadian chain of over 100 privately owned restaurant franchises operating in the province of Quebec, Canada. The first restaurant opened in 1979 in Saint-Hyacinthe, Quebec. During the 1990s, the chain underwent a major renewal plan in which the restaurants' design changed along with the company's colours. The company's fare is typical Canadian fast food, such as burgers, fries, sandwiches and poutine.

In August 2011, MTY acquired Jugo Juice for $15.5 million. The Calgary-based franchise operating in the smoothie industry oversaw 133 locations at the time it was acquired. In Quebec, the franchises are branded as 'Jus Jugo Juice' under the company's interpretation of Bill 96.

That same month, MTY also purchased the Mr. Sub franchise for $23 million; at the time it was a chain of 335 sandwich shops.

In November 2011, MTY acquired the 20 unit Koryo Korean BBQ chain for $1.8 million in cash. Except for one corporately owned store, all units were franchised. The chain had locations in Alberta, British Columbia, Ontario, Quebec and Saskatchewan at the time of the acquisition.

MTY acquired the chain Mr. Souvlaki Ltd. on November 26, 2012, for $1 million. The chain had 14 stores at the time, 13 in Ontario and one in British Columbia. At the time of the takeover system-wide sales were $4.5 million.

In May 2013, MTY subsidiary MTY Tiki Ming Enterprises Inc. struck an agreement to buy the assets of Mississauga, Ontario-based Extreme Brandz, owner of Extreme Pita, PurBlendz, and Mucho Burrito, for $45 million (U.S.) from the three co-founders, Alex Rechichi, Mark Rechichi and Sean Black. Extreme Brandz's 40 U.S. stores became MTY's first stores in the United States. Of the 364 stores acquired, 5 were corporately owned.

In June 2013, MTY paid $1.05 million to acquire SushiGo, a small chain of five restaurants, two of which were corporately owned.

In October 2013, MTY acquired 80 percent of the Thai Zone restaurant chain for $17.7 million. At the time of the acquisition, Thai Zone had 25 stores and 3 mobile restaurants in the province of Quebec, all of which were franchised.

MTY Food Group announced on July 8, 2014, that it had completed the acquisition of the assets of Café Dépôt, Sushi Man, Muffin Plus, and Fabrika. The total consideration for the transaction was $13.9 million, paid from MTY's cash on hand and existing credit facilities. At closing, the chains were operating 101 stores, including 13 corporately owned stores.

In July 2014, MTY purchased Madison New York Grill & Bar for 12.9 million. The deal involved 14 franchised stores, all located in Quebec.

In November 2014, MTY purchased Café Van Houtte from Keurig Canada. The deal involved 51 franchised stores, all located in Quebec.

In December 2014, MTY paid $7.9 million from cash on hand to acquire Manchu Wok, which had 133 stores in its operations, 114 of which were franchised and 19 corporately owned. During its most recent completed fiscal year, the network generated approximately $95 million in system sales.

In September 2015, MTY paid $3 million to acquire 60 percent of Big Smoke Burger. Big Smoke founder and president Mustafa Yusuf retained the remaining 40 percent of the company. At the time of the acquisition, Big Smoke Burger had a total of 17 locations. Of the 17 locations, 9 were located in Canada, 4 of which were corporately owned. The remaining 8 locations were in the United States and the Middle East.

In May 2016, MTY announced a friendly takeover deal with the Kahala Brands Ltd restaurant franchise company (2,800 stores worldwide). MTY thereby added 18 American brands to its portfolio, including Cold Stone Creamery, America's Taco Shop, and Kahala Coffee Traders. MTY agreed to pay about US$300 million to acquire Kahala. The two companies generated near $2 billion in revenues in the previous year. The acquisition was completed on July 26, 2016.

In September 2016, MTY announced the pending acquisition of California-based BF Acquisition Holdings, the parent company for Baja Fresh and La Salsa, for US$27 million. The acquisition was completed the following month and the brands were transferred to MTY's Kahala subsidiary.

In December 2016, MTY acquired 60 percent of the 5-unit ice cream chain La Diperie for $0.9 million paid in cash.

In September 2017, MTY acquired the Montreal-based Dagwoods Sandwiches et Salades for $3 million. At the time of the acquisition, the chain had 22 locations in Quebec and 1 in Ontario.

In December 2017, MTY bought Imvescor, a restaurant group with about 300 restaurants under the brands Pizza Delight, Bâton Rouge, Scores, Mikes, and Ben & Florentine.

Following an announcement made in February 2018, MTY acquired the assets of Timothy's World Coffee and Mmmuffins from Threecaf Brands, Canada, Inc., a subsidiary of Le Duff America, in April 2018.

In September 2018, MTY agreed to acquire American frozen yogurt chain Sweet Frog for $35 million. The chain had 332 locations at the time.

On December 11, 2018, MTY signed a deal to acquire South St. Burger within 90 days. South St. had 26 franchises and 14 corporate restaurants at the time of the announcement. The acquisition was completed in March 2019 for $4.1 million in cash.

MTY acquired Yuzu Sushi, a Quebec City-based sushi chain, in 2019.

On July 22, 2019, MTY announced that one of its wholly owned subsidiaries acquired most of Allô! Mon Coco, a chain serving gourmet breakfast and lunch.

In April 2019, MTY purchased Vancouver, Washington-based Papa Murphy's Holdings Inc., a take-and-bake pizza chain, for $190 million. Papa Murphy's oversees 1400 restaurants across 37 states.

In August 2022, MTY agreed to merge with BBQ Holdings Inc, a franchisor and operator of restaurants in 37 U.S. states, in Canada, and in the United Arab Emirates. The acquisition was finalized in September 2022. BBQ Holdings was the parent for Famous Dave's, Bakers Square, Village Inn, Granite City Food & Brewery and Tahoe Joe's.

In December 2022, MTY completed the acquisition of Wetzel's Pretzels for $207 million.

== Canadian franchise operations for other global brands ==
Within Canada, MTY also operates as a franchise operator for global brands such as TCBY and Yogen Früz. For a time, MTY was also a franchise operator for Taco Time until it became its global owner.

In 2005, MTY purchased TCBY Canada, which held TCBY (The Country's Best Yogurt) franchise rights in Canada, for $1.3 million. At the time there were 91 locations.

MTY owns exclusive Canadian franchise rights to Yogen Früz for 20 years that began in 2006 due to a $13 million agreement made with Coolbrands International.

== Sustainability ==
In 2021, the company established an ESG committee, responsible for environmental, social, and governance matters. The team advises the board of directors and presents quarterly updates, starting in 2022. 83 percent of committee members are female which means males are under-represented. The last public report on these matters was published in 2021, establishing the pillars of company's ESG strategy: food, planet, and people.

== See also ==
- List of Canadian restaurant chains
