= Ben & Florentine =

Canadian breakfast and lunch restaurant chain

Ben & Florentine Restaurants Inc.
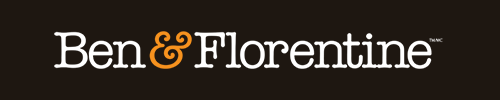
- Industry: Food / Restaurants
- Founded: 2008; 18 years ago
- Headquarters: Saint-Laurent, Québec, Canada
- Number of locations: 60
- Website: http://benandflorentine.com

Ben & Florentine Restaurants Inc. is a Canadian breakfast and lunch restaurant chain, serving around 4 million customers per year. The founders used characteristics from their own families to create the concept of the chain. Each Ben & Florentine restaurant is owned individually as a franchise.

== History ==
Ben & Florentine was founded in 2008 in Saint-Laurent, Quebec, and the first restaurant opened in Vaudreuil-Dorion, Quebec on June 1, 2009. By 2011, the chain had opened 16 locations in the province of Quebec, Canada. The franchise has been a CFA member since 2010.

The restaurant chain began by serving an extensive breakfast and lunch menu.

In 2012 the chain expanded into Ontario, and by 2014 there were 31 locations. In 2015 the chain continued to expand with 43 franchised units.

In January 2016, Ben & Florentine opened its first restaurant in the province of Manitoba in the city of Winnipeg. During 2016, Ben & Florentine kept growing in the Greater-Montréal area with the opening a franchise inside the tennis club of the nuns' island, and also including a location in Sherbrooke, Quebec.

Around 65 restaurants will be open by the end of 2020.

== See also ==
- List of Canadian restaurant chains
