= Booster Juice =

Canadian chain of juice and smoothie bars

Booster Juice Inc.

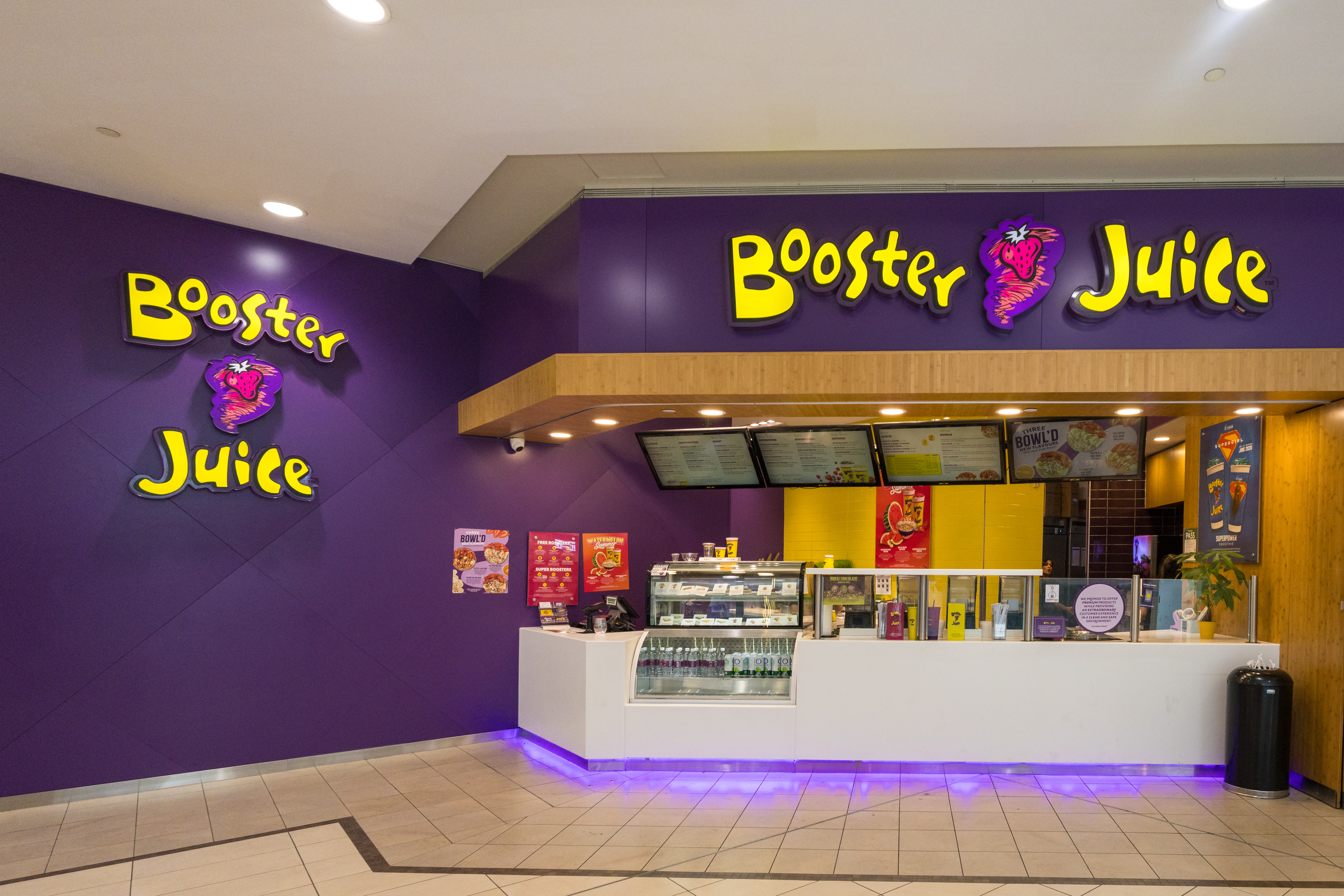
- Booster Juice in Scarborough Town Centre, Toronto
- Type: Private
- Industry: Restaurants Franchising
- Genre: Juice bar
- Founded: November 1999; 26 years ago in Sherwood Park, Alberta
- Founder: Dale Wishewan
- Headquarters: Edmonton, Alberta, Canada
- Website: boosterjuice.com

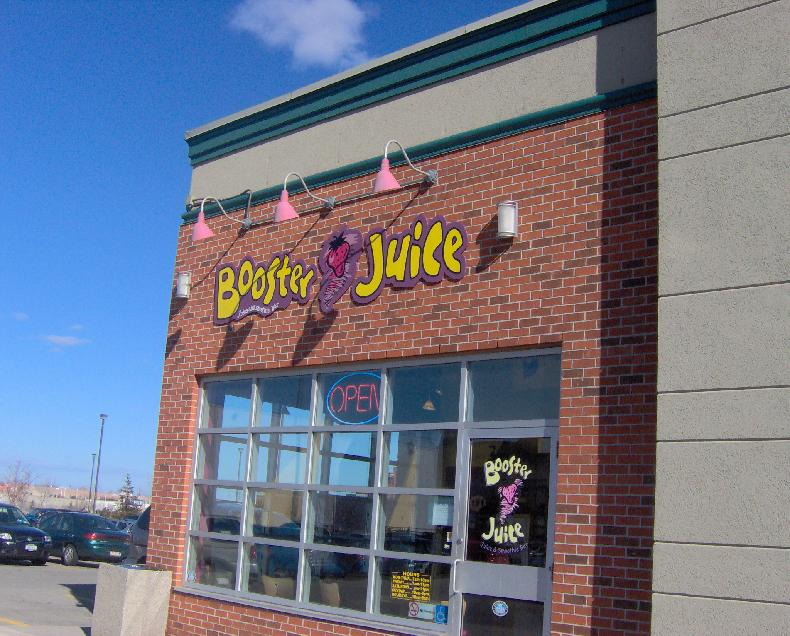
A Booster Juice located in Ancaster, Ontario

Booster Juice Inc. is a Canadian chain of juice and smoothie bars founded in 1999. The chain specializes in smoothies made of pure juice, fruit sorbet or vanilla frozen yogurt, frozen fruit, fresh yogurt and ice. Founded in Sherwood Park, Alberta by owner and CEO Dale Wishewan, the chain quickly expanded through franchising to over 400 locations in Canada. According to their CEO, it set a Canadian record for opening 50 stores in the first two years of operation.

== History ==
Dale Wishewan opened the first Booster Juice in 1999, when he realised the market for juice bars in Canada. Prior to opening the first Booster Juice, Wishewan tested the idea at his home by offering smoothies to family and neighbours. Shortly afterwards, the first Booster Juice location opened in November 1999 in Sherwood Park, a community located east of Edmonton. Dale Wishewan has remained the President and CEO of Booster Juice.

Booster Juice expanded to other regions in Canada, although the bulk of its stores continue to be located in Western Canada. Encouraged by this success, franchises expanded internationally in the 2000s.

The first Booster Juice with a drive thru can be located in Windsor, Ontario, Canada.
