= Extreme Pita =

Canadian fast-food chain

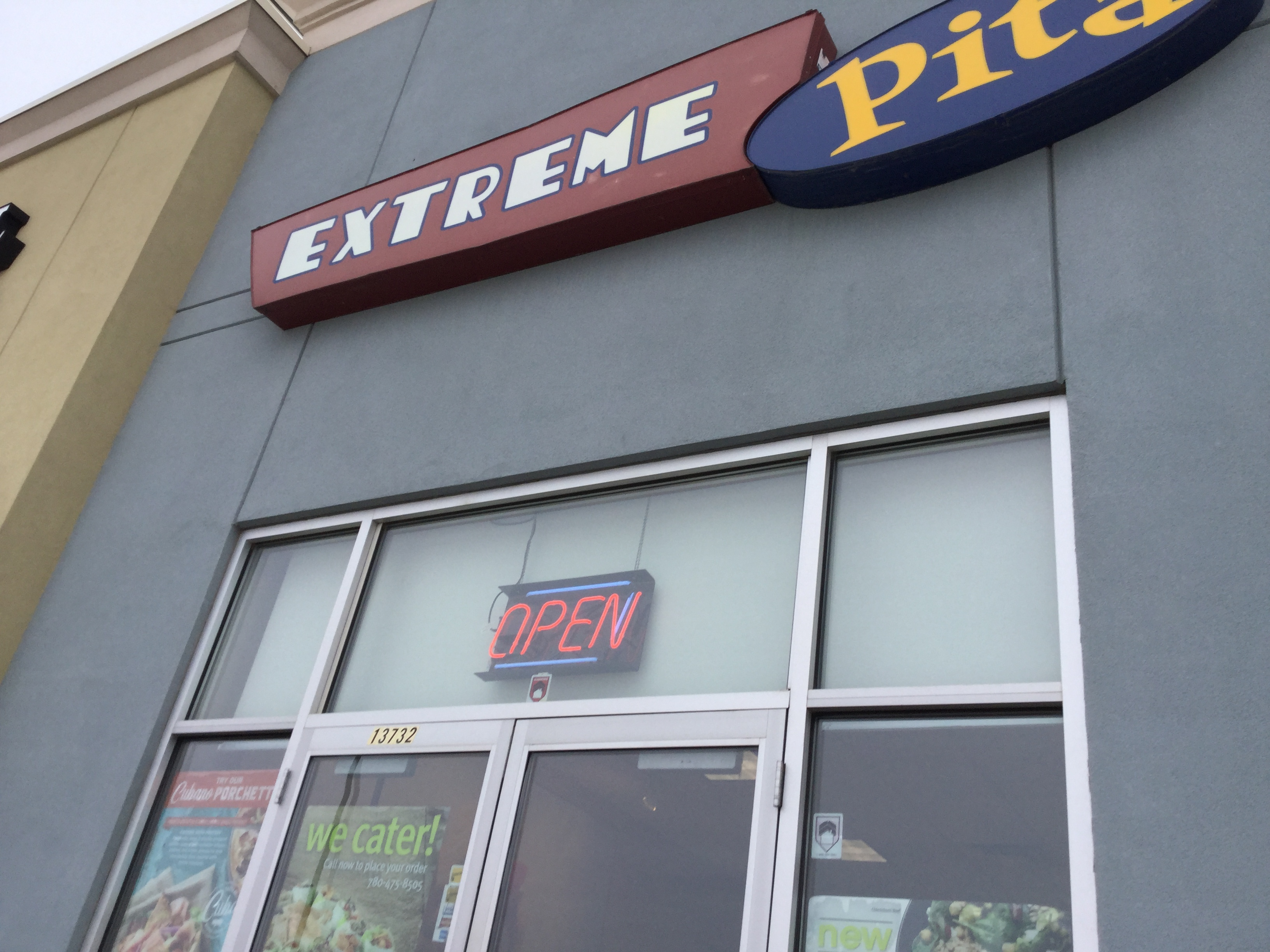
- Extreme Pita in Edmonton, Alberta
- Founded: 1997; 29 years ago in Waterloo, Ontario
- Founders: Alex and Mark Rechichi
- Headquarters: Richmond Hill, Ontario
- Number of locations: 15
- Area served: Canada, United States
- Products: Pita wraps, salads, pita pizzas
- Revenue: $45 million (2006)
- Number of employees: 2,000
- Parent: Extreme Brandz (1997–2013); MTY Food Group (2013–present)
- Website: extremepita.com

Extreme Pita is a Canadian-based fast-casual chain, owned by MTY Group. Headquartered in Richmond Hill, Ontario, the company has 15 locations throughout Canada and the United States.

Extreme Pita serves pita sandwiches, salads, and pizza-style "flat-baked" pitas. Available ingredients include fresh vegetables, cheeses, meats and vegetarian options such as falafel and hummus.

== History ==
Extreme Pita was founded in 1997 by brothers Alex and Mark Rechichi. The first Extreme Pita opened near Wilfrid Laurier University in Waterloo, Ontario in 1997, but the original location is no longer operating.

The company continued to expand and grow over the years, expanding into new locations in Canada, from 1997 (the year when the first Extreme Pita was opened) to 2003 (when Extreme Pita began to expand into the United States). The expansion challenged already-established fast food companies like Subway and McDonald's. By 2007, there were about 200 stores in Canada. Extreme Pita claims they are a healthy low fat snack, and is also well known for its vegetarian options.

The Canadian-based Extreme Pita began to expand to include stores in the United States in 2003, beginning with Arizona. The company has continued to add locations throughout the United States, mainly through franchising. Since 2003, Extreme Pita has expanded into locations in California, New York, Texas, and other parts of the Western, Mideastern, and Northeastern United States.

In May 2013, Extreme Pita was acquired by MTY Food Group when MTY purchased Extreme Pita's then parent Extreme Brandz from the Rechichi brothers for $45-million.

=== Extreme Brandz ===
Extreme Brandz was formed as a holding company for Extreme Pita in 2006 when the owners of Extreme Pita decided to expand into the Mexican fast food business through the launching of Mucho Burrito. PurBlendz was launched in 2008 as smoothie co-brand for existing Extreme Pita operators.

== Products ==
Extreme Pita sells a variety of pita wraps, including cheese steak, falafel and chicken Caesar selections, wrapped in "Lebanese-style" pita bread. These pitas are available in 6 inch and 9 inch sizes. The company also offers soups, salads, and a variety of flat-bread pizza pitas, baked on location. Its products are portrayed as a "healthy alternative to fast food." For example, the cheese and meat used to make their products are unprocessed.
