= Big Smoke Burger =

Hamburger restaurant chain based in Canada

- The logo of Big Smoke Burger

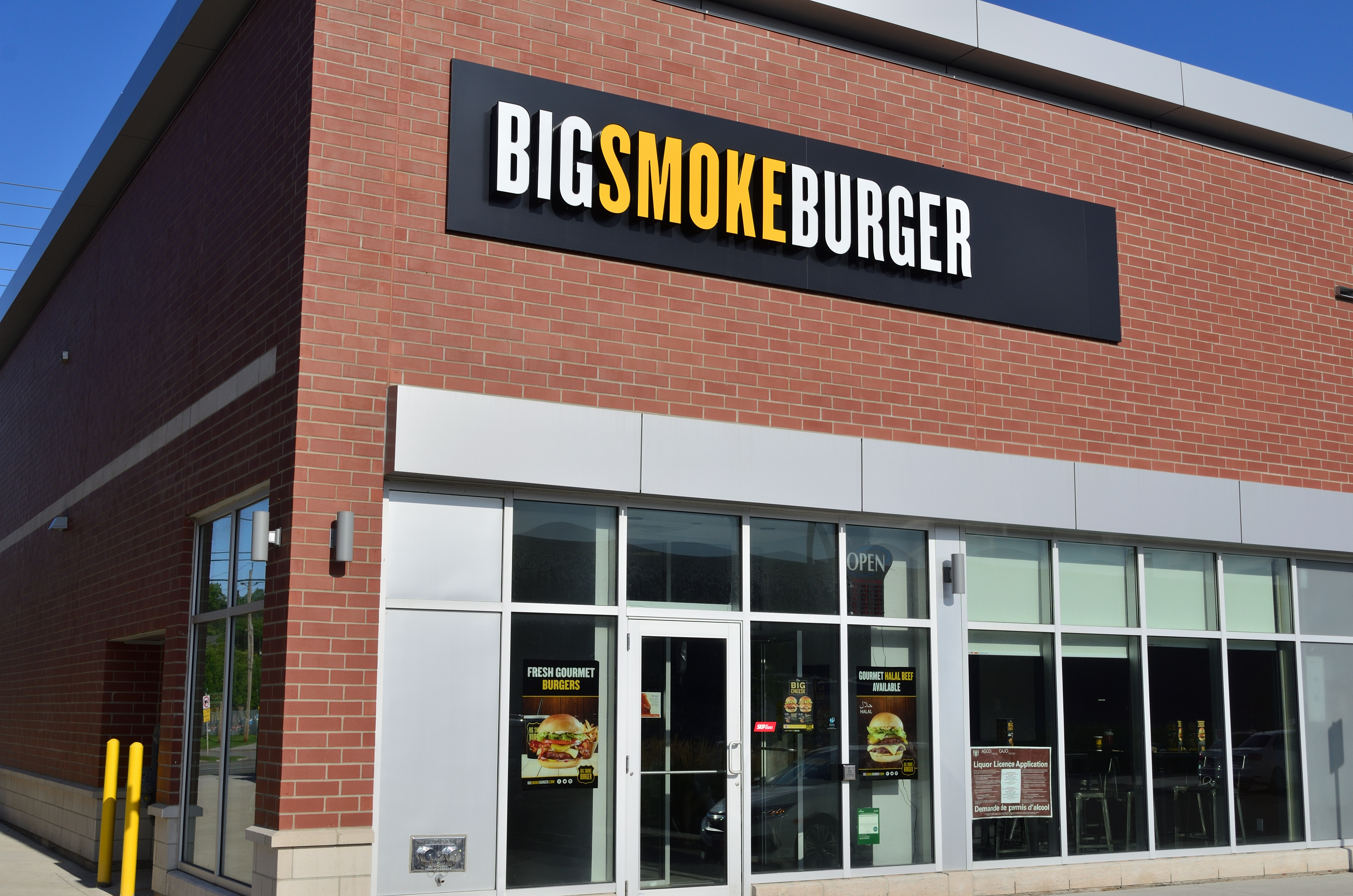
- Big Smoke Burger in Markham, Ontario (2019)
- Type: Subsidiary
- Industry: Restaurants Franchising
- Founded: November 2007; 19 years ago in Toronto
- Founder: Mustafa Yusuf
- Headquarters: Toronto, Canada
- Number of locations: 12
- Areas served: North America, United Arab Emirates
- Key people: Mustafa Yusuf
- Products: (hamburgers • chicken • lamb • salads)
- Parent: MTY Food Group
- Website: bigsmokeburger.com

Big Smoke Burger is an international restaurant chain based in Canada with other locations in the United Arab Emirates.

== History ==
The Big Smoke Burger was founded by Mustafa Yusuf in November 2007, originally under the name Craft Burger. It rebranded to Big Smoke Burger in 2011 after Yusuf was unable to secure a trademark for the original name. The new name was chosen as "Big Smoke" has been a noted nickname for the city of Toronto, which is where the company has its headquarters.

In 2013, the company began to expand its reach into the Middle East and the United States. As of June 2025, 12 locations were in operation worldwide.

In June 2013, Big Smoke Burger opened their first location in the United States in Glendale, Colorado. A second location was opened in New York City in July 2014. The sale of burgers and poutine never caught on south of the St. Lawrence River and both locations were quietly closed by 2017 and the company has since left the United States.

=== MTY ===
In September 2015, MTY Food Group paid $3 million to acquire 60% of Big Smoke Burger. Big Smoke founder and president Mustafa Yusuf retained the remaining 40% of the company.

At the time of the acquisition, Big Smoke Burger had a total of 12 locations. Of the 12 locations, 9 were located in Canada, 4 of which were corporately owned. The remaining 3 locations were in the United Arab Emirates.

After the sale, Yusuf remained with the company as Senior Vice President of Big Smoke Burger.

== See also ==
- List of Canadian restaurant chains
- List of hamburger restaurants
