= List of fast-food chains in Canada =

This is a list of notable fast-food chains in Canada. This list includes fast-food chains that are located in Canada, with the addition of those that are based or headquartered in other countries.

== Fast-food chains in Canada ==
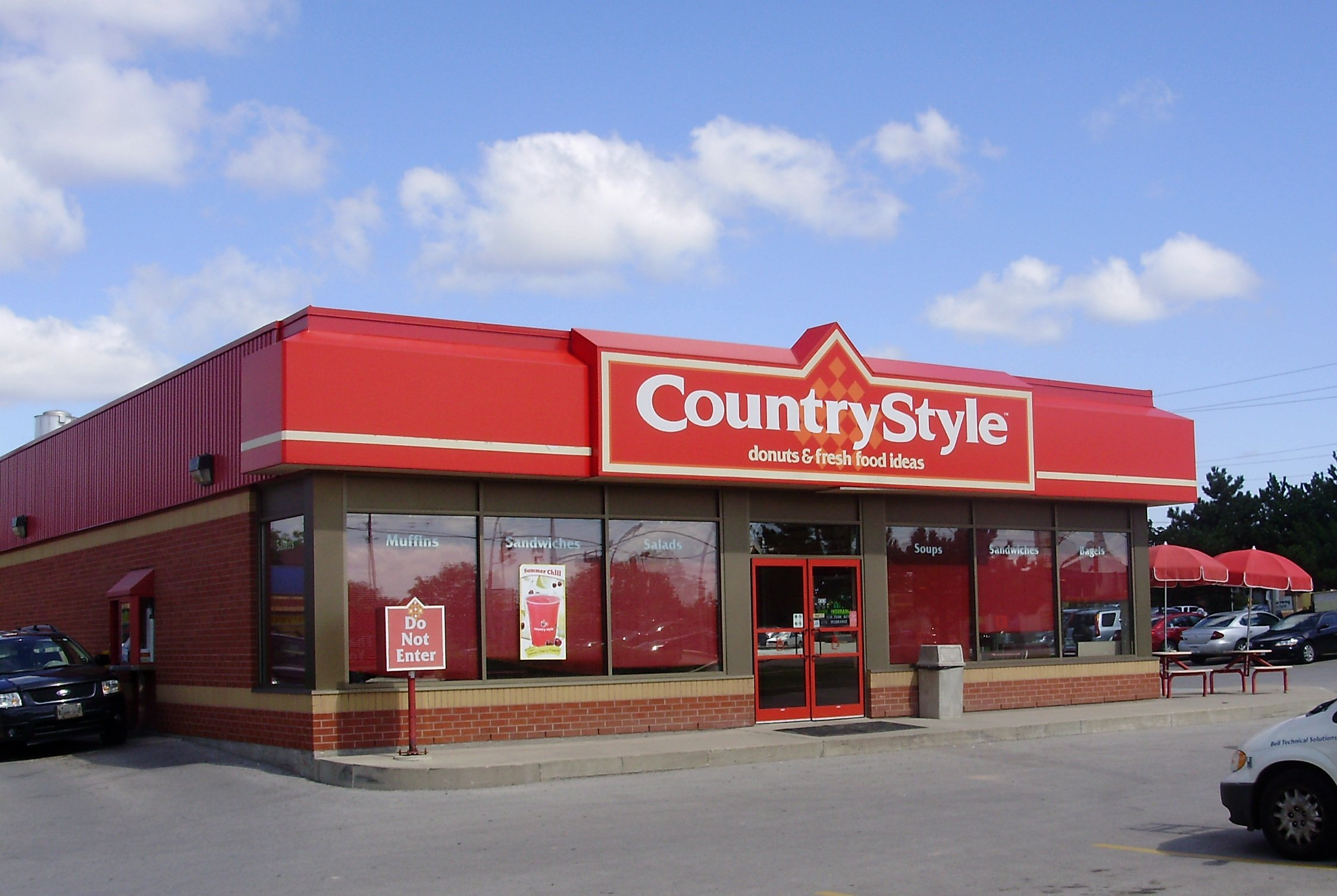
A Country Style location in Milton, Ontario

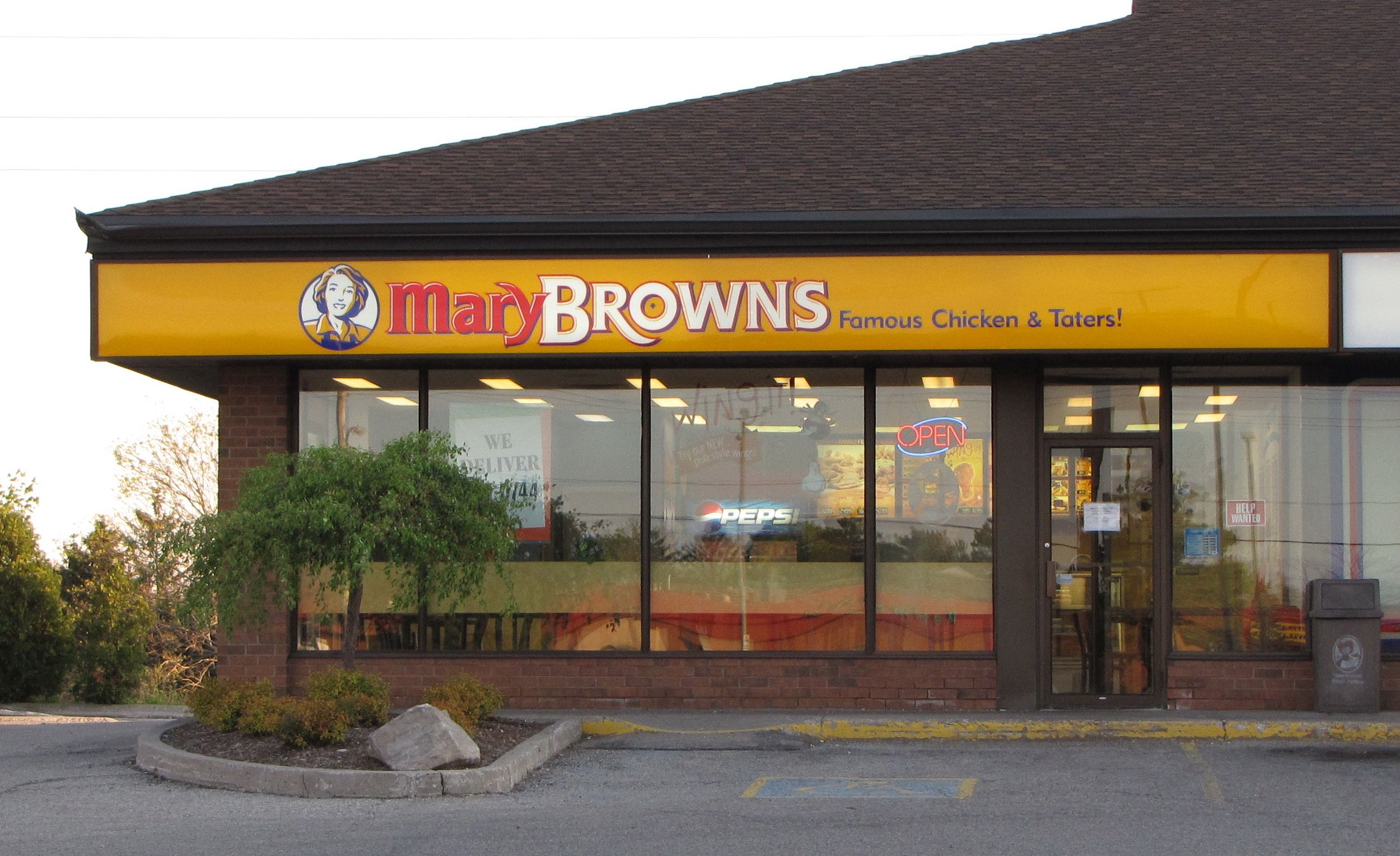
A Mary Brown's location in Guelph, Ontario

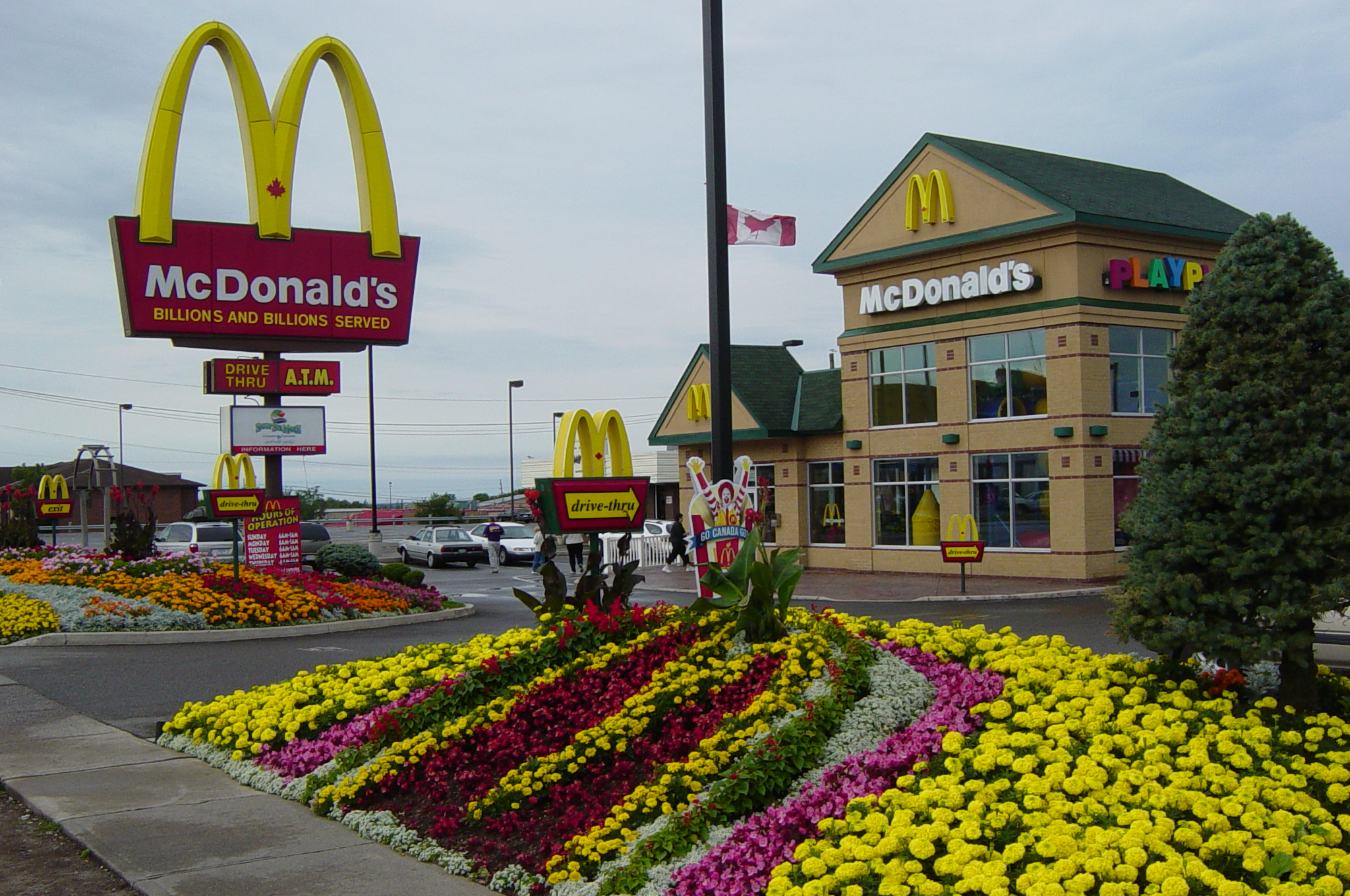
A McDonald's Canada location in Sault Ste. Marie, Ontario

- A&W
- Arby's
- Applebee's
- Auntie Anne's
- La Belle Province
- barBURRITO
- Baskin-Robbins
- Blaze Pizza
- Booster Juice
- Boardwalk Burgers
- Burger Baron
- Boston Pizza
- Burger King
- Carl's Jr.
- Chez Ashton
- Chicken Delight
- Chipotle Mexican Grill
- Chick-fil-A
- Church's Texas Chicken
- Cora
- Cinnabon
- Coffee Time
- Country Style
- Dairy Queen
- Dave's Hot Chicken
- Denny's
- Dixie Lee Fried Chicken
- Domino's Pizza
- Edo Japan
- Extreme Pita
- East Side Mario's
- Five Guys
- Fryer's
- Freshii
- Firehouse Subs
- Fatburger
- Greco Pizza
- Godfather's Pizza
- Harvey's
- Hero Certified Burgers
- IHOP
- Jersey Mike's Subs
- Jimmy the Greek
- Jimmy John's Subs
- Jollibee
- KFC
- Krispy Kreme Donuts
- Kelseys Original Roadhouse
- Lafleur Restaurants
- Little Caesars
- Manchu Wok
- Mary Brown's Chicken
- McDonald's Canada
- Mrs. Fields
- Marble Slab Creamery
- Mr.Sub
- Mucho Burrito
- Montana's BBQ & Bar
- Milestones Grill & Bar
- New York Fries
- Orange Julius
- OPA! of Greece
- Panago
- Panda Express
- Papa John's
- Pita Pit
- Pizza Pizza
- Pizza Hut
- Pizza Nova
- Panera Bread
- Pizza 73
- Popeyes Louisiana Kitchen
- Quiznos Subs
- Qdoba
- Robin's Donuts
- Second Cup
- Smitty's
- St-Hubert
- Shoeless Joe's
- Subway
- Swiss Chalet
- St Louis
- Shake Shack
- Starbucks Coffee
- Taco Bell
- Taco del Mar
- Taco Time
- Thaï Express
- The Chopped Leaf
- Tim Hortons
- The Keg
- Valentine
- Wendy's
- White Spot
- Wild Wing
- Wimpy's Diner
- Wingsnob
- Wingstop
- Yogen Früz

== Fast-food chains that have gone defunct in Canada ==
- Lick's Homeburgers (closed in 2021) – bankruptcy
- Dunkin' Donuts (closed in 2018) – competition with Tim Hortons
- Cold Stone Creamery (closed in 2017) – co-branded locations did not work out after merger with Tim Hortons
- Buffalo Wild Wings (closed in 2023) – "routinely evaluates locations"

== See also ==
- List of Canadian restaurant chains
- List of fast food restaurant chains
- Lists of restaurants
