= Red Light District (disambiguation) =

A red-light district is a neighborhood where prostitution is common.

Red Light District may also refer to:

- The Red Light District, 2004 album by Ludacris
- The Red Light District (theatre company), a Toronto, Ontario-based theatre collective
- Red Light District Video, a pornography studio based in Los Angeles, California
- Red-Light District, Montreal
- "Red Light District", A Lost 2015 Extended Play by rapper XXXTentacion
