= Montreal hot dog =

Type of hot dog

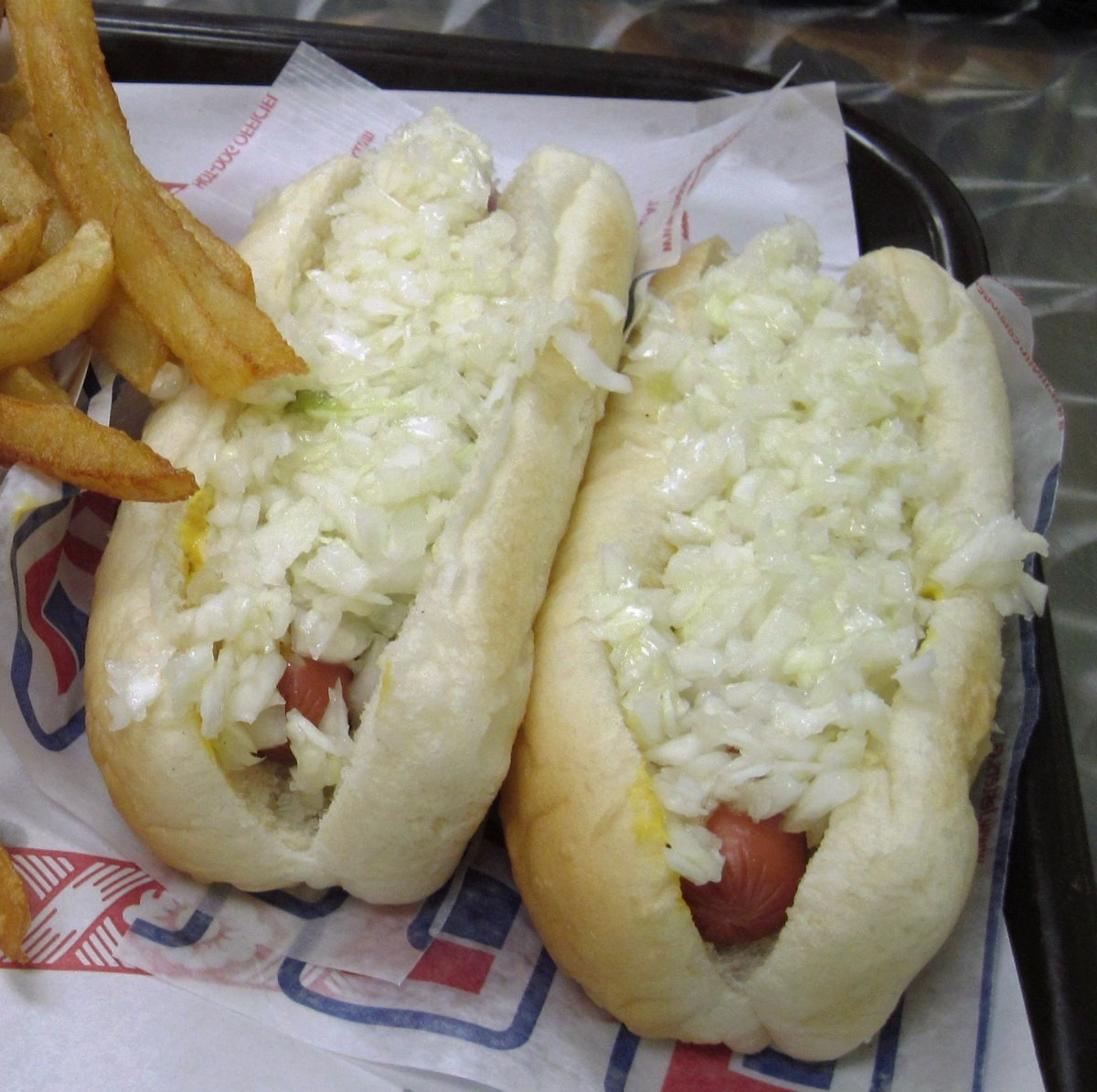
- All dressed steamé from the famous Montreal Pool Room
- Alternative names: Steamé, stimé, steamies, steamy, vapeur, roteux
- Type: Hot dog
- Place of origin: Canada
- Region or state: Montreal

The Montreal hot dog (French: steamé, or douille), also known as a steamie, is one of several variations of hot dogs served as a fast food staple at restaurants and diners in Montreal and other parts of Quebec.

In Montreal (and elsewhere in the province of Quebec), the hot dog buns used to prepare steamies are side loading, while a top loading (New England style) hot dog bun is used for toasted hot dogs. Montreal hot dogs are considered to be rather small and are generally sold for between $2.00 and $3.00 depending on the area of purchase and dressing. Popular hot dog brands include Lesters, Lafleur's, and Glatt's kosher.

The city of Montreal did not permit street food carts from 1947 until 2011, leading to a proliferation of small "greasy spoon" restaurants which are variations on the classic Québécois casse-croute (snack bar) restaurants. These restaurants may serve hot dogs with fresh-cut fries (patates frites, often served "very brown and greasy"), poutine, hamburgers, pogos (corn dogs), hamburger steaks, in addition to Greek dishes (typically souvlaki and gyro), pizza, and smoked meat. Restaurant chains known for their hot dogs include La Belle Province, Valentine, and Lafleur Restaurants. Some longstanding Montreal independent restaurants famous for their steamies include Decarie Hot Dogs and Montreal Pool Room.

The "steamie" hot dog variety has become quite popular across Canada, now frequently replacing the traditional one. Steamie parlours, called "wieneries", have opened across Canada and are replacing typical hot dogs at franchised restaurants, too.

== Variations ==
Montreal hot dogs may either be steamé (also stimé), translated into English as "steamies", (a term briefly used by an Ontario chain affiliated with the La Belle Province chain), which are fresh from the steamer and rather soft, or toasté (referred to in English as "toasties"), which are grilled or toasted until crisp. Toastés are slightly more expensive and less popular.

In Montreal, hot dogs generally come dressed one of three ways:

- All-dressed (Montreal Style): This hot dog, usually a 'steamie', is topped with mustard, chopped onion, relish and fresh coleslaw or plain chopped cabbage ("choux" in French); however, sauerkraut, or coleslaw of the creamy variety, is rarely used. An all-dressed hot dog typically does not include ketchup, which must be requested specifically. All-dressed can also just be mustard, onions and relish or even mustard, coleslaw and relish.
- Michigan hot dog: This hot dog is topped with meat chili sauce or spaghetti sauce. It can be served with or without diced onions and mustard.

== See also ==
- List of hot dogs
- Cuisine of Quebec
