= History of Montreal cabarets =

The history of Montreal cabarets ranges from the early 1920s to the 1970s. Cabarets were unquestionably a social, economic and cultural phenomenon that radically transformed the entertainment scene in Montreal and Quebec.

Propelled by American Prohibition, Montreal cabarets hosted renowned artists from the United States and France, causing Montreal to quickly gain a reputation as a party town, attracting large numbers of tourists, especially Americans. Also, many American jazz artists performed in the city. On the other hand, in the 1950s, Montreal's cabarets became an important venue for the emergence of new Québécois talent.

The scene reached its peak in two periods: around 1930, and again in the late 1940s. However, the New York and later the Montreal Mafia had close ties with the cabaret world, and the vitality of cabarets was eventually affected by the popularity of television and a campaign of public repression led by Mayor Jean Drapeau in the late 1950s, until the beginning of the 1970s, when cabarets disappeared from the Montreal scene.

== 1920s and 1930s ==
=== Origins ===
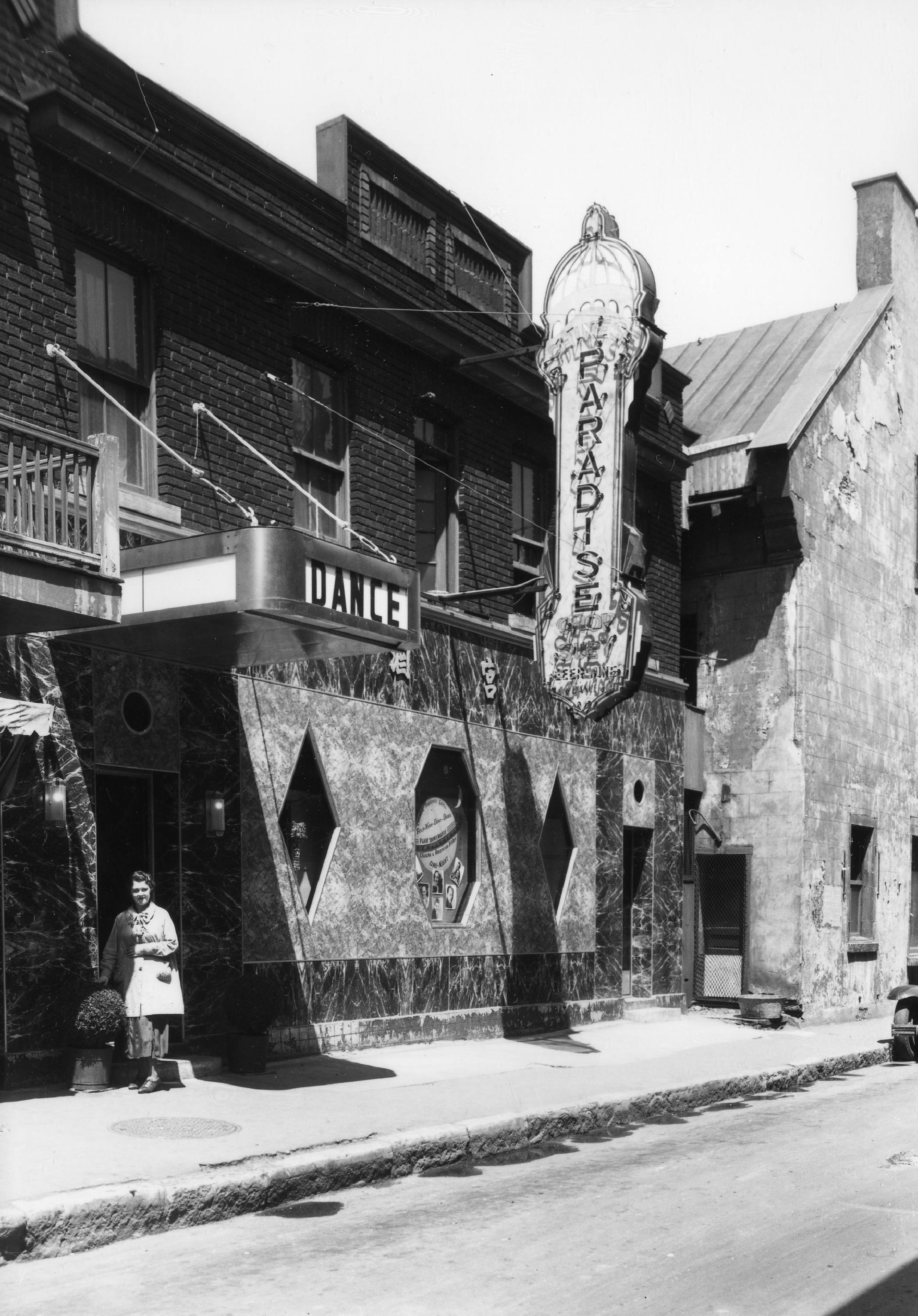
Chinese Paradise Cabaret in the 1930s

On 16 January 1920, the United States Congress passed a constitutional amendment (the Prohibition Act) prohibiting the production and consumption of beverages containing more than half a percent alcohol. This measure had the direct effect of rapidly ruining New York City cabarets (particularly those in Harlem) and putting their artists out of work.

In 1921, the Taschereau government, in contrast to the rest of the continent, opted for an avant-garde solution: the creation of the Société des alcools du Québec, which allowed legal (and controlled) access to all alcoholic beverages.

From the mid-1920s onwards, a number of artists from the New York scene moved to Montreal to perform in the burgeoning Montreal cabaret scene. By the end of the 1920s, Montreal already boasted several popular nightclubs and clubs: the Boulevard, the Commodore, the Hollywood, the Blue Sky, and the Chinese Paradise Cabaret, as well as American-style clubs and a variety theater heavily influenced by American vaudeville.

However, Montreal's reputation as a major North American cabaret city was confirmed when New York's leading cabaret star, Texas Guinan, arrived in Montreal in 1930 to open the Cabaret Frolics. This star entertainer and singer was known for shouting "Hello suckers!" as she entered the stage at the start of every performance. Texas Guinan caused a sensation on the Main (Saint Laurent Boulevard) but, more importantly, accelerated the popularity of Montreal, and a host of American cabaret artists (MCs, singers, musicians, etc.) also settled in Montreal. A veritable oasis for anyone seeking to escape prohibitionist policies, Montreal quickly established a reputation as a magnet for tourists, investors and gamblers. Cabarets, clubs and betting parlors made Montreal a city of entertainment.

=== End of Prohibition ===
The economic crisis of 1929, and especially the end of Prohibition in the United States in 1933, severely affected Montreal's nightlife. Many American stars returned to live in the United States, while American customers became rarer. Frolics Cabaret closed its doors in 1933 after three years of operation.

But by the early 1930s, Montreal's reputation as an "open city" had already been established, and it was beginning to be referred to as the "Paris of North America". Any illicit pleasure could be purchased here at any time of the day or night. The entertainment industry was built on a multimillion-dollar parallel empire, with the gambling industry directly or indirectly financing the nightlife, its activities and its "around the clock" pleasures.

Unfortunately, the New York mafia moved into Montreal, turning it into a little Chicago. Clark Street became famous for its brothels and gambling dens. At the corner of Saint-Laurent and Ontario, the biggest telephone betting exchange in America was set up. All of this helped build Montreal's reputation, a reputation that, with the help of the Mafia, enabled the cabaret scene to survive these difficult years.

== 1940s ==
=== The Golden Age ===
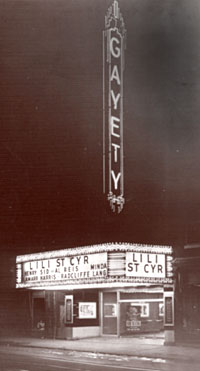
The Gaiety Theatre in 1946

In the early 1940s, there were between 25 and 30 cabarets in Montreal, but it was after the end of World War II that Montreal's cabaret scene experienced its most prosperous period, lasting around a decade. By the end of the 1940s, some forty cabarets in a wide variety of styles were operating in Montreal at the same time.

The appearance of the Au Faisan Doré cabaret in 1947 changed the face of Montreal cabarets. Jacques Normand opened a Francophone cabaret where French and Québécois artists performed to great acclaim. This formula was emulated, with Montreal cabarets welcoming all the big stars from the United States, France and Quebec.

French greats Charles Aznavour, Tino Rossi and Charles Trenet performed at the Au Faisan Doré cabaret, and Édith Piaf and Patachou at the Cabaret Sans souci. Frank Sinatra, Dean Martin, Jerry Lewis and Sammy Davis Jr performed at Cabaret Chez Paree. Great shows by strippers such as Lili St-Cyr, Peaches and Gypsy Rose Lee could be seen at Gaiety Theatre and Cabaret Roxy. Even French singer Mistinguett, at the age of 80, made a presence at Cabaret Montmartre in 1955.

During these years, especially from 1946 to 1954, there was a fierce battle between the best-known Montreal cabarets to attract American and French stars. French stars included Line Renaud, Jacqueline François, Henri Salvador, Yves Montand, Guy Béart, Lucienne Boyer, Luis Mariano, Maurice Chevalier and Bourvil, all of whom made numerous appearances in Montreal.

From chic cabarets such as El Morocco, Tic Toc and the Normandie Roff (located in the Hôtel Mont-Royal) to populist ones like the Casino Bellevue on the corner of Bleury and Ontario, not to mention the Rialto, Crystal Palace and Roxy, Montreal's nightlife scene was filled with unparalleled diversity and vitality. Cabaret Samovar, El Morocco and Tic Toc even offered shows "every hour on the hour".

In a column called Cabaret Circuit, journalist and columnist Al Palmer of the Montreal Herald described in his weekly articles all the news, gossip, star appearances, changes of ownership and names in the world of Montreal cabarets.

At the heart of this effervescence and new reputation, Saint-Laurent boulevard predominated, and was soon associated with the nickname of Montreal's Red-Light District. During this period, which can be considered the golden age of Montreal nightlife, provincial and municipal authorities kept a complacent eye on the activities of bars and clubs. For example, since the 2 a.m. closing time law was not enforced, the public went home at sunrise. Many popular illegal establishments violated municipal and provincial laws, but in the post-war context, it seemed to be of little concern to anyone.

=== The Corner ===
The Corner, at the intersection of Craig (now Saint Antoine) and de la Montagne streets, was the focal point of jazz in Montreal from 1945 to the mid-1950s. Rockhead's Paradise and Café St-Michel were established here. American musician Louis Metcalf moved to Montreal in 1946 and hosted Café St-Michel for almost 10 years. He formed the International Band, the first ensemble to play the new bebop style in Montreal and Canada. This was the period when Oscar Peterson became a recognized jazz pianist and Oliver Jones began his career. Black jazz artists such as Art Pepper, Fats Navarro and Sonny Rollins were regular performers.

== 1950s ==
=== Quebec's presence and vibrancy ===
In the early 1950s, Montreal's cabaret scene continued to experience extraordinary effervescence, despite changes in cabaret names and owners. Jacques Normand was now host and master of ceremonies at Cabaret Saint-Germain-des-Prés, and other French-language cabarets appeared in Montreal (e.g. Cabaret Casa Loma, le Beu qui rit, etc.) in the 1950s. Cabarets also sprang up in every region of Quebec, and artists began to tour the province.

Montreal cabarets featured an increasing number of Montreal and Quebec artists (entertainers, singers, comedians, musicians), inspired by the success of the Au Faisan Doré cabaret. In the 1950s, these included Monique Leyrac, Félix Leclerc, Raymond Lévesque, Dominique Michel, Clémence DesRochers, Denise Filiatrault, Pauline Julien, Oscar Peterson, Oliver Jones, Paul Berval and Les Jérolas (a duo made up of Jérôme Lemay and Jean Lapointe).

The arrival in Montreal of Egyptian-born dancer Fawzia Amir in 1955, followed by the opening of Club Sahara in 1957, introduced a previously unknown dance style to Quebec, belly dancing, and popularized traditional Egyptian and Middle Eastern folk dance.

Jean Simon played a very active role as impresario and scout for new French-speaking talent in the 1950s and 1960s with his "Les découvertes de Jean Simon" (The discoveries of Jean Simon) competition, which was very popular at the "Café de l'Est" cabaret and at "Casa Loma". Ginette Reno (among others) began a successful career there.

However, the actions of Montreal mayor Jean Drapeau and the growing popularity of television from the mid-1950s onwards dealt a heavy blow to cabarets in Montreal and, by extension, throughout Quebec.

=== Jean Drapeau's influence as mayor of Montreal ===
In response to the links between the Mafia and certain businesses in Montreal's Red-Light district, Dr. Ruben Lévesque founded the Comité de moralité publique de Montréal (Montreal Public Morals Committee) in March 1950. With the help of a young lawyer by the name of Jean Drapeau, and information gathered by lawyer Pacifique Plante (also known as Pax Plante), this committee requested and obtained a public inquiry from the Quebec Superior Court. The Caron inquiry (named after the judge who presided over it) presented its report on 8 October 1954. Charges were laid against 20 police officers, who were prosecuted and dismissed. The same day, Jean Drapeau announced his decision to run for mayor in the next municipal election, scheduled for 28 October. He founded the Civic Party, which took advantage of the Caron Report and, with a program to "clean up" the city, became mayor of Montreal. Pacifique Plante was immediately appointed head of the morality squad.

An intense wave of repression against gambling houses (called "barbotes") and brothels followed. These actions had a negative effect on Montreal's still numerous cabarets.

However, a certain tabloid press violently attacked the administration and, in 1957, after an election marred by irregularities, Jean Drapeau was ousted from City Hall and replaced by Sarto Fournier. After a three-year hiatus, Jean Drapeau returned to power in 1960 and "finished the job". The "Roxy" and the "Bijou" were even demolished, scaring away the perpetual party atmosphere that had prevailed until then.

== Decaying cabarets ==
Although some cabarets continued to operate with some success into the 1960s (e.g. Café Saint-Jacques, Café de l'Est, Cabaret Casa Loma, Café et Cabaret Montmartre and Mocambo), the decline was visible and irreversible. New police measures, the popularity of television and the arrival of a new musical style (rock) all converged to silence the cabaret scene as it had existed in the 1930s, 1940s and 1950s.

After the Expo 67, the world of Montreal cabarets was, so to speak, a thing of the past. The vast area that was home to Montreal's cabarets in the 1950s was given a new lease of life by the Quartier des spectacles project.

== Impact of Montreal cabarets on television and film ==
In the early years of Canadian television (1950s), a few flagship programs brought sudden fame to cabaret artists. Music-Hall and Au p'tit café, for example, were directly inspired by Montreal cabarets, giving stars such as Dominique Michel, Jacques Normand and Paul Berval the visibility they needed to propel their careers.

Subsequently, the effervescence of Montreal cabarets, the presence of numerous foreign stars, the recognized links with the mafia (local or New York) and its role in the emergence of Quebec artists left their mark on the Montreal and Quebec imagination.

As a result, many Quebec films and TV productions are reminiscent of this world:

- 1953 – 1955: Le Café des artistes (TV) with Gilles Pellerin, Jacques Normand et Lucille Dumont.
- 1955 – 1957: Porte ouverte (TV) avec Gilles Pellerin et Jacques Normand
- 1955 – 1962: Music-Hall (TV) hosted by Michelle Tisseyre
- 1956 – 1961: Au p'tit café (TV) hosted by Dominique Michel, Normand Hudon and Pierre Thériault
- 1992: Montréal ville ouverte de Lise Payette (TV)
- 1992 – 1995: Montréal P.Q. de Victor-Lévy Beaulieu (TV)
- 1999 – Les Girls (National Film Board of Canada documentary)
- 2004: Jack Paradise: Montreal by Night de Gilles Noël (Cinema)

== List of Montreal cabarets ==
Cabaret Frolics – 1417, Saint-Laurent boulevard (1930–1933); Val d'Or (Café) – 1417, Saint-Laurent boulevard (1942–1946); Au Faisan Doré – 1417, Saint-Laurent boulevard (1947–1950); Café et Cabaret Montmartre – 1417, Saint-Laurent boulevard (1951–1970); Cabaret Saint-Germain-des-Prés – at the southwest corner of Ste-Catherine and St-Urbain streets, now gone to make way for Complexe Desjardins; Café Savoy – 1457, Saint-Alexandre street; Café Domingo; Café de l'Est – 4558, Notre-Dame Est street; Café Continental: 108, Sainte-Catherine West street, now demolished to make way for the Complexe Desjardins.; Café du Nord – 10715, Pie-IX Boulevard; Café St-Michel – 770, De la Montagne Street (south of St-Antoine); Café Rialto: 1217, Saint-Laurent boulevard (1930–1983), at the end under the name of New Rialto Café; Le Café Provincial: corner of boulevard Dorchester (renamed René-Lévesque boulevard in 1987) and Saint-Hubert street; Crystal Palace – 1225 St-Laurent Blvd. Built in 1908 – after several transformations, it became Club Soda in 2000; Café Eldorado – 5777, Saint-Laurent boulevard, later Le Diplomate; Cabaret Blue Sky – 65, Saint-Catherine West Street; Cabaret La Ceinture fléchée – 97, Sainte-Catherine Est Street (now Les Foufounes électriques); Casa Loma – 94, Sainte-Catherine East street (1940, 1950, 1960); Casino Français – 1224, boulevard Saint-Laurent (1951–1969); Casino Bellevue – 375, Ontario West street (Bleury corner) (21 April 1949 – end of 1950)	Gaiety Theatre – 84, Sainte-Catherine West street (1912–1953) (today the Théâtre du Nouveau Monde); Aux Trois Castors – 415, Sainte-Catherine Est street, now demolished to make way for UQAM's Pavillon Judith-Jasmin; The Café St-Jacques: 415, Sainte-Catherine Est street, located beneath the Aux Trois Castors cabaret at the corner of St-Denis and Ste-Catherine, now demolished to make way for UQAM's Pavillon Judith-Jasmin; Chez Paree (or Chez Paris) – 1258, Stanley street (now a strip club still active in 2023); Club Lido – 1258, Stanley street (1931–?); Club Sahara – 374 Sherbrooke West street (1957–?); and 1177 De la Montagne Street; Club Samovar – 1424 Peel street (1928–1950); El Morocco – 1445, Lambert-Closse street; Tic Toc Club; Cabaret Chinese Paradise – 53–57, de La Gauchetière street, in Montreal's Chinatown (1920s and 1930s); Chez Maurice – 1244, Sainte-Catherine West street (1933– mid 1940s); Sans Soucy – 1244, Sainte-Catherine West street; Hollywood Club – 92, Ste-Catherine Est street (1920s and 1930s); Boîte La Cave – Mayor street; Le Mocambo or Café Mocambo: 2591, Notre-Dame Est street; Lion d'Or: 1676, Ontario Est street (1930-in operation in 2016 as an entertainment and reception venue); Beaver: corner of Ste-Catherine and Bleury streets; Rockhead's Paradise – 1258 Saint Antoine West street (1931–1982); Normandie Roff – located on the roof of the Hôtel Mont-Royal (now Les Cours Mont-Royal, at the corner of Peel street and De Maisonneuve Boulevard); The Bijou – 20, de la Gauchetière street (demolished in the early 1960s); The Roxy – 1159, Saint-Laurent boulevard (demolished in the early 1960s); Strand Theatre – 912, Ste-Catherine West street; The Sheik – Notre-Dame street; The Bagdad – opposite the Hôtel Mont-Royal; The Yellow Tea Pot; The Ohio House

Source for cabaret addresses and years of operation:

- Bourassa, A. G.; Larrue, J. M. (1993a). Éditions VLB. (ed.). Les nuits de la Main : Cent ans de spectacles sur le boulevard St-Laurent (1891–1991) [Nights on the Main: One hundred years of shows on boulevard St-Laurent (1891–1991)] (in French). Montreal.
- Namaste, Viviane (2005). C'était du spectacle! L'histoire des artistes transsexuelles à Montréal, 1955–1985, McGill-Queen's University Press [It was a show! The history of transsexual artists in Montreal, 1955–1985, McGill-Queen's University Press] (in French).
- Marrelli, Nancy (2004). Véhicule Press (ed.). Stepping Out. The Golden Age of Montreal Night Clubs 1925–1955. Montreal. pp. 125–131.

== See also ==
General articles: Saint Laurent Boulevard; Red-Light District, Montreal; Quartier des spectacles; Cabaret	People: Pacifique Plante; Texas Guinan; Lili St. Cyr; Jean Drapeau

== Bibliography ==
- Bourassa, A. G.; Larrue, J. M. (1993). Les nuits de la Main : Cent ans de spectacles sur le boulevard St-Laurent (1891–1991) [Nights on the Main: One hundred years of shows on boulevard St-Laurent (1891–1991)] (in French).
- Weintraub, W. (1998). McClelland & Stewart Inc. (ed.). City Unique : Montreal Days and Nights in the 1940s and 1950s. Toronto. ISBN 0-7710-8991-0.
- Gubbay, Aline (1989). Meridian Press (ed.). A street called the Main. The story of Montreal's boulevard St Laurent. Montréal. ISBN 0-929058-07-0.
- Proulx, Daniel (1997). VLB (ed.). Le Red Light de Montréal [Montreal's Red-Light] (in French). Montréal. ISBN 2-89005-656-2.
- Charbonneau, Jean-Pierre (1975). Éditions de l'Homme (ed.). La Filière canadienne [The Canadian Connection] (in French). Montréal. ISBN 0-7759-0471-6.
- Plante, Pacifique (1950). Éditions de l'Action nationale (ed.). Montréal sous le règne de la pègre [Montreal under the reign of the mob] (in French). Montréal.
- Day, Pierre (1997). Les Éditions Logiques (ed.). Jean Rafa, de Paris aux nuits de Montréal [Jean Rafa, from Paris to Montreal nights] (in French).
- Michel, Dominique (2006). Éditions de la semaine (ed.). Y'a des moments si merveilleux [There are moments so wonderful] (in French).
- Brousseau, Pierre (1963). Editions des Succès populaires (ed.). La vie tumultueuse de Jacques Normand [The tumultuous life of Jacques Normand]. Montréal.
- Normand, Jacques (1980). Éditions Stanké (ed.). De Québec à Tizi-Ouzou [From Quebec City to Tizi-Ouzou] (in French). Montréal.
- Gauthier, Robert (1998). Ed. de l'Homme (ed.). Jacques Normand, l'enfant terrible [Jacques Normand, the terrible child] (in French). Montréal.
- St. Cyr, Lili (1982). Éditions Québecor (ed.). Ma Vie De Stripteaseuse [My Life As A Stripper]. (in collaboration with Louis Jean D'Amour).
