= Steamie =

Steamie may refer to:

- A Montreal hot dog, also known as a steamie
- The Steamie, a play by Tony Roper
- A public, communal laundry - see Laundry § Washhouses
- A term used for steam engines in the television series Thomas & Friends
