= Montreal Pool Room =

Restaurant in Montreal, Quebec, Canada

Coordinates: 45°30′35.661″N 73°33′47.785″W

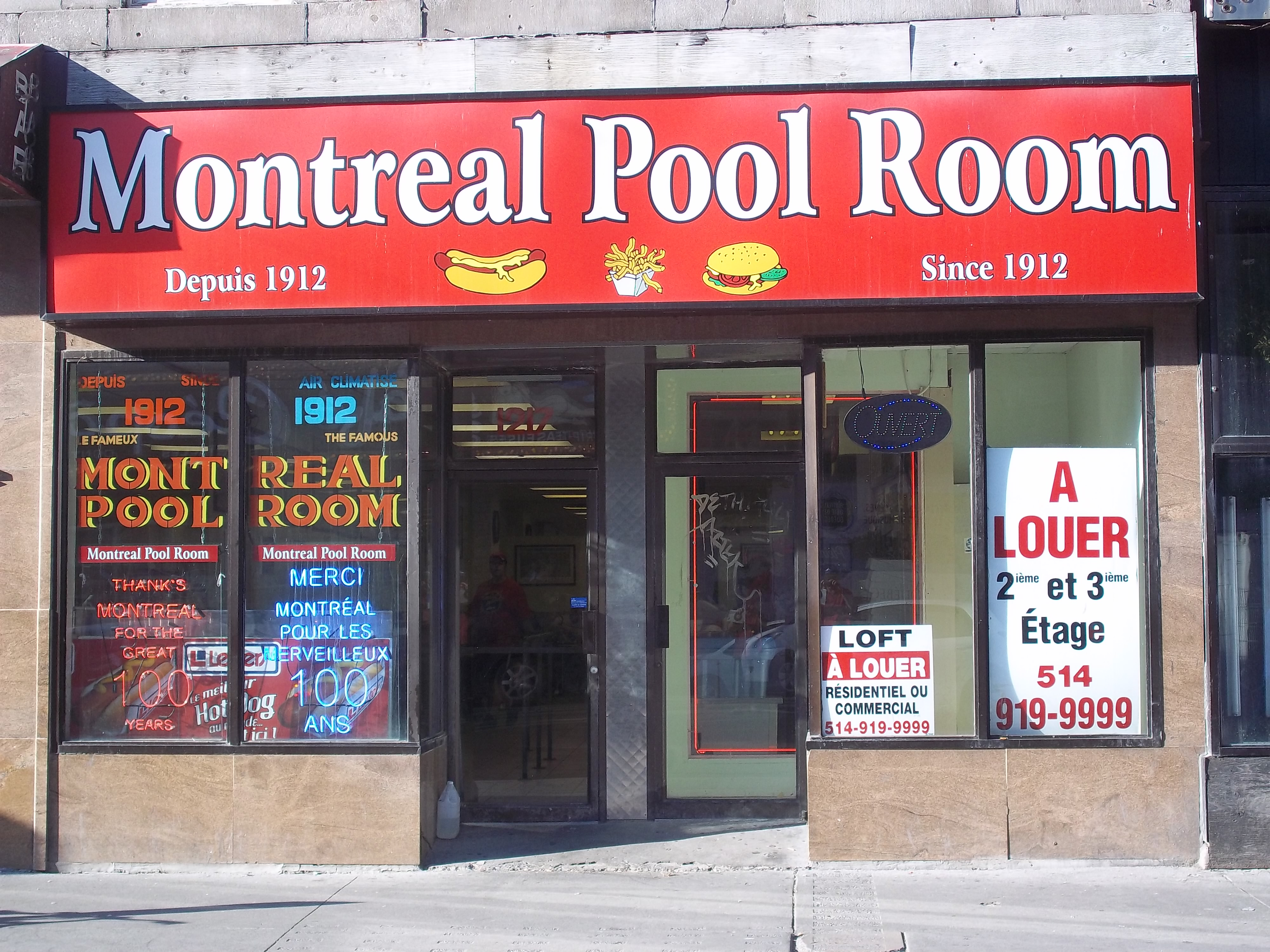
Montreal Pool Room at its new location, in June 2012

The Montreal Pool Room is a well-known and well-regarded greasy spoon restaurant, located in the city's former red-light district on Saint Laurent Boulevard, in Montreal, Quebec, Canada. The restaurant has been open since 1912 (registered 1921) and is known for its "underground allure", described by some as being a "seedy goodness". Though called a "pool room" by name, it no longer has a pool table.

== Offerings ==
The restaurant's primary offerings are:

- Montreal hot dog: Steamé (steamed bun with steamed hot dog) or toasté (toasted bun with grilled hot dog)
- French fries: plain or as a poutine

== Gallery ==
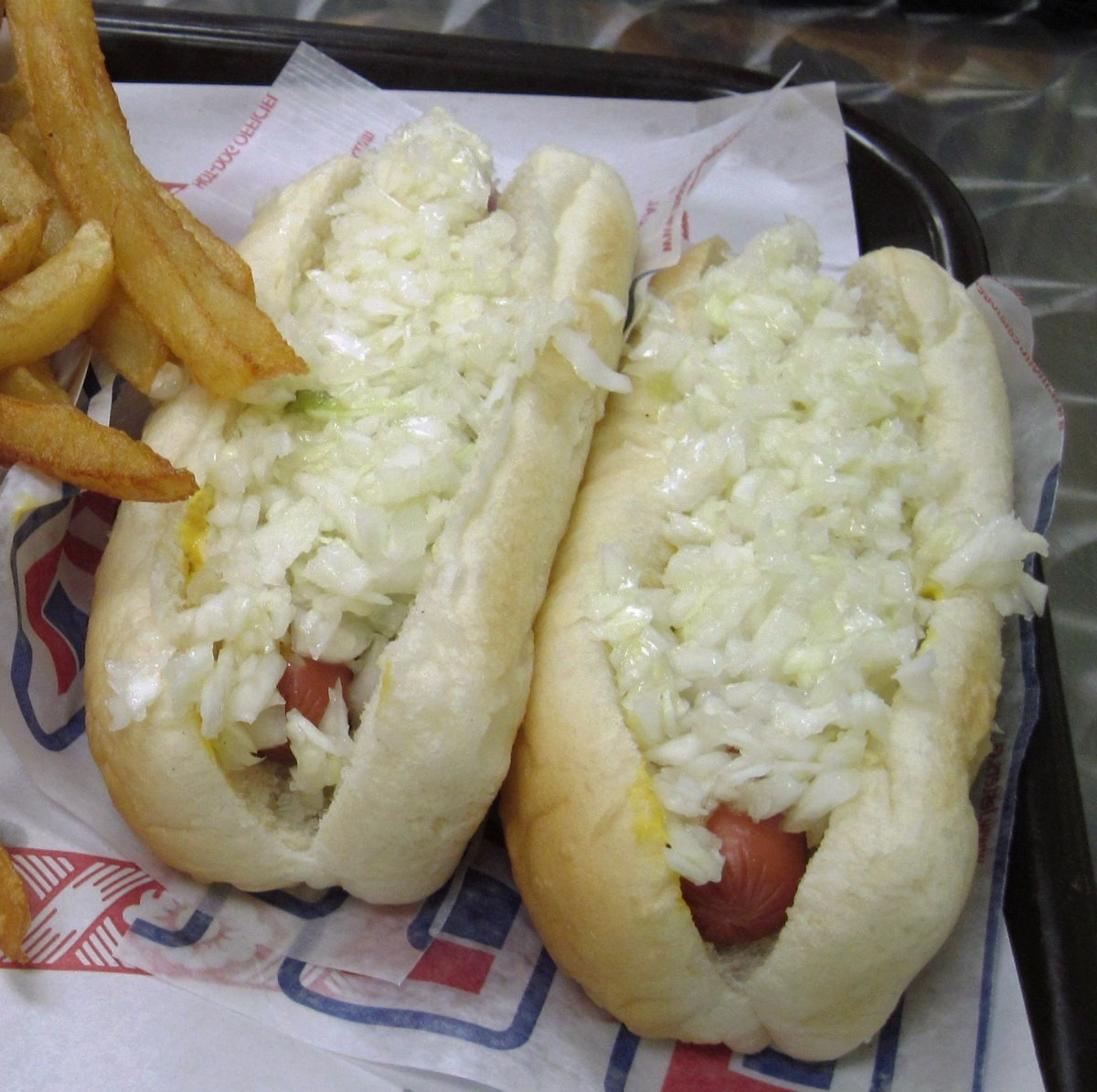
Two hot dog steamé

== History ==
The Montreal Pool Room, founded in 1912 by Dako Filipov, a Bulgarian immigrant, is reputed to serve some of the best steamed hot dogs and "patates frites" in the city. Despite its name, it is no longer a functioning pool room, with the restaurant's pool tables long gone:

The only remaining evidence of its former billard hall status, aside from the name, are two boarded up tables now used for counterspace in the otherwise table-free eatery.

The Montreal Pool Room was burned down by a fire in 1989, which according to some destroyed its original interior and had to be rebuilt.

The establishment was one of several businesses on the strip resisting attempts to redevelop and gentrify the area, which is located within the new Quartier des Spectacles.

In March 2010, the restaurant announced that it was moving nearby to make room for new developments in the district. Since then, it has moved across the street.

== See also ==
- Decarie Hot Dog
