= La Belle Province (restaurant) =

Fast food restaurants chain in Quebec, Canada

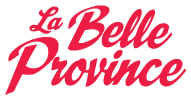

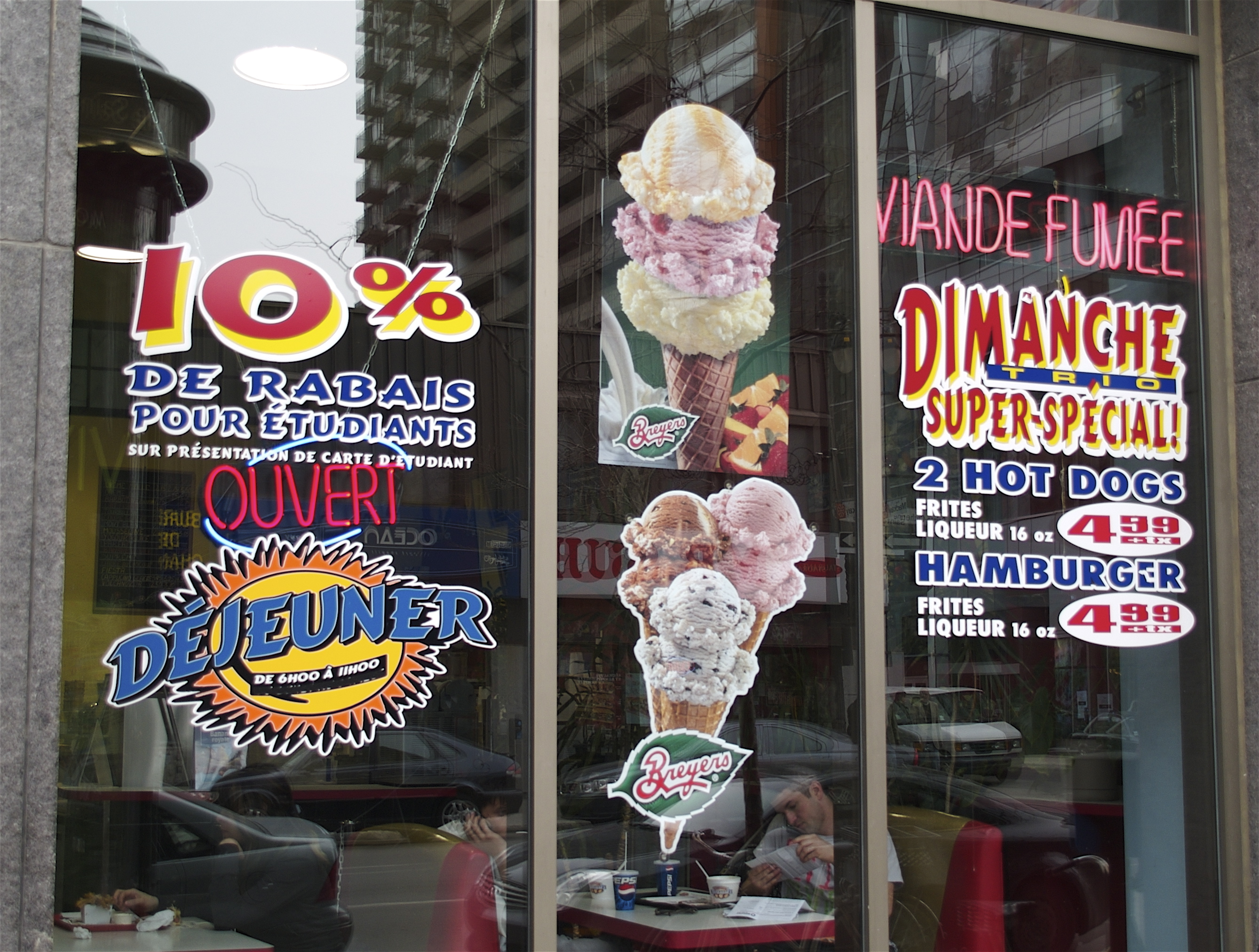
- Type: Fast food restaurant chain
- Industry: Food service
- Founded: 1970; 56 years ago at Sherbrooke Street
- Founder: Peter Kivetos
- Headquarters: Canada
- Areas served: Quebec, Canada
- Products: Food and drink

La Belle Province (English: The Beautiful Province) is a well-known fast food restaurant chain in the province of Quebec, Canada. It is also known as LBP, LB, BP, La Belle Pro, Belle Pro, La Belle or Labelle, as nicknames. Each location is independently franchised; some are open 24 hours a day.

== History ==
Founder Peter Kivetos, a native of Greece, opened the first La Belle Province on Sherbrooke Street East in 1970. He took the name with permission from a restaurant on Saint Catherine Street where he had worked, which had burned down in the 1960s. It became a franchise when the second location was opened in Saint-Hubert in 1976.

Kivetos' ownership group had 45 locations in 1997. By 1999 there were 125 locations under the name La Belle Province. It is not strictly a franchise operation, in 1999 there were six different ownership groups, mostly relatives of Kivetos.

In 2010, two restaurant owners were fined $22,000 for failure to pay the Goods and Services Tax and were charged an additional $45,000 for the amount that they owed.

== Fare ==
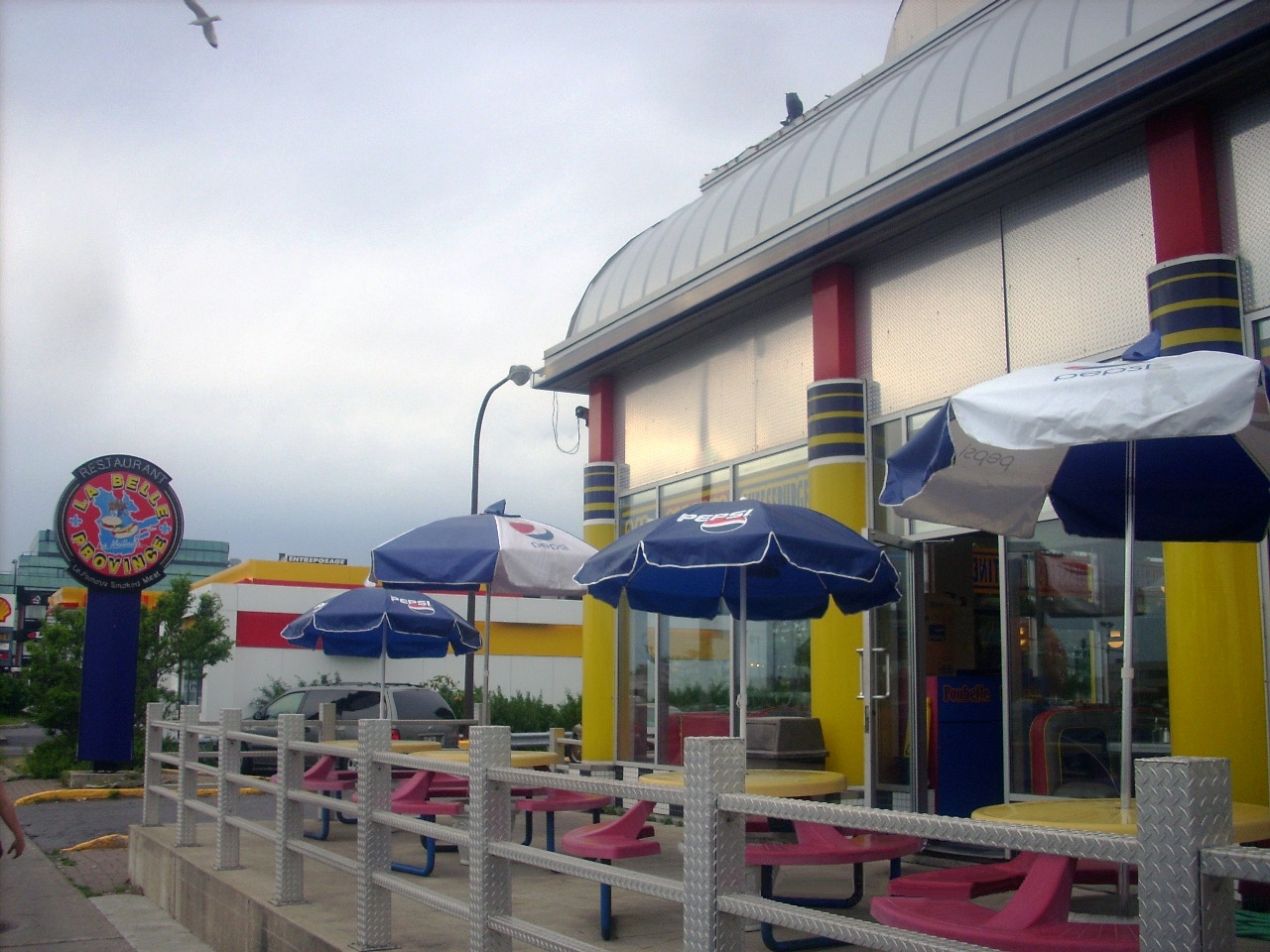
Pepsi logos at La Belle Province location on Décarie Blvd. in Montréal. This location was formerly Dunkin' Donuts.

La Belle Province serves breakfast and lunch, including items such as poutine, club sandwiches, hamburgers, Montreal hot dogs, smoked meat sandwiches, and souvlaki.

== Reason for the various names ==
A Quebec judge ruled that the La Belle Province franchise owners could not prevent others from giving a similar name to their restaurants, because "la belle province" is an official nickname for the province of Quebec. This resulted in several knock-off franchises that had menus and prices similar to the original franchise in order to capitalize on its existing image and marketing. Notable knock-offs include Belle Province II, La Plus Belle Province, La Belle Québécoise and La Très Belle Province.

== See also ==
- List of Canadian restaurant chains
- Dic Ann's Hamburgers
- Lafleur Restaurants
- Valentine (restaurant)
