= Country Style =

Canadian coffee shop chain

Country Style Food Services Inc.
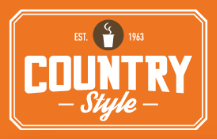
- Country Style logo used since 2015
- Trade name: Country Style
- Type: Wholly owned subsidiary
- Industry: Coffee shop
- Genre: Fast casual restaurant
- Founded: 1963; 63 years ago Toronto, Ontario
- Founders: Tony Wood; Christine Wood
- Headquarters: Richmond Hill, Ontario
- Number of locations: 420 (December 31, 2021)
- Areas served: Ontario; Western Canada; Nova Scotia; Prince Edward Island; New Brunswick
- Products: Breakfast foods including coffee, doughnuts and sandwiches
- Parent: MTY Food Group (2001–present)
- Website: https://countrystyle.com/

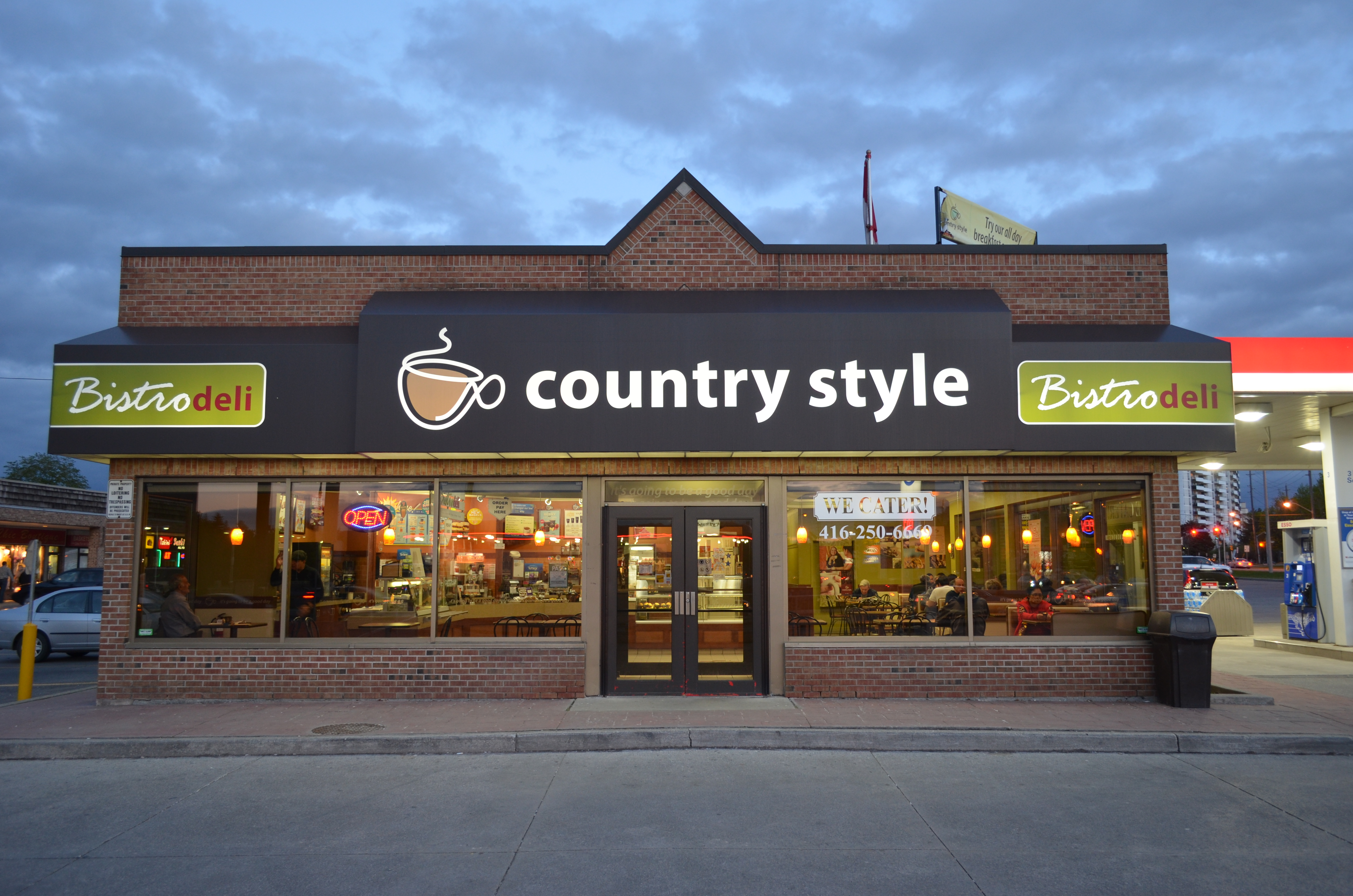
Country Style in Toronto

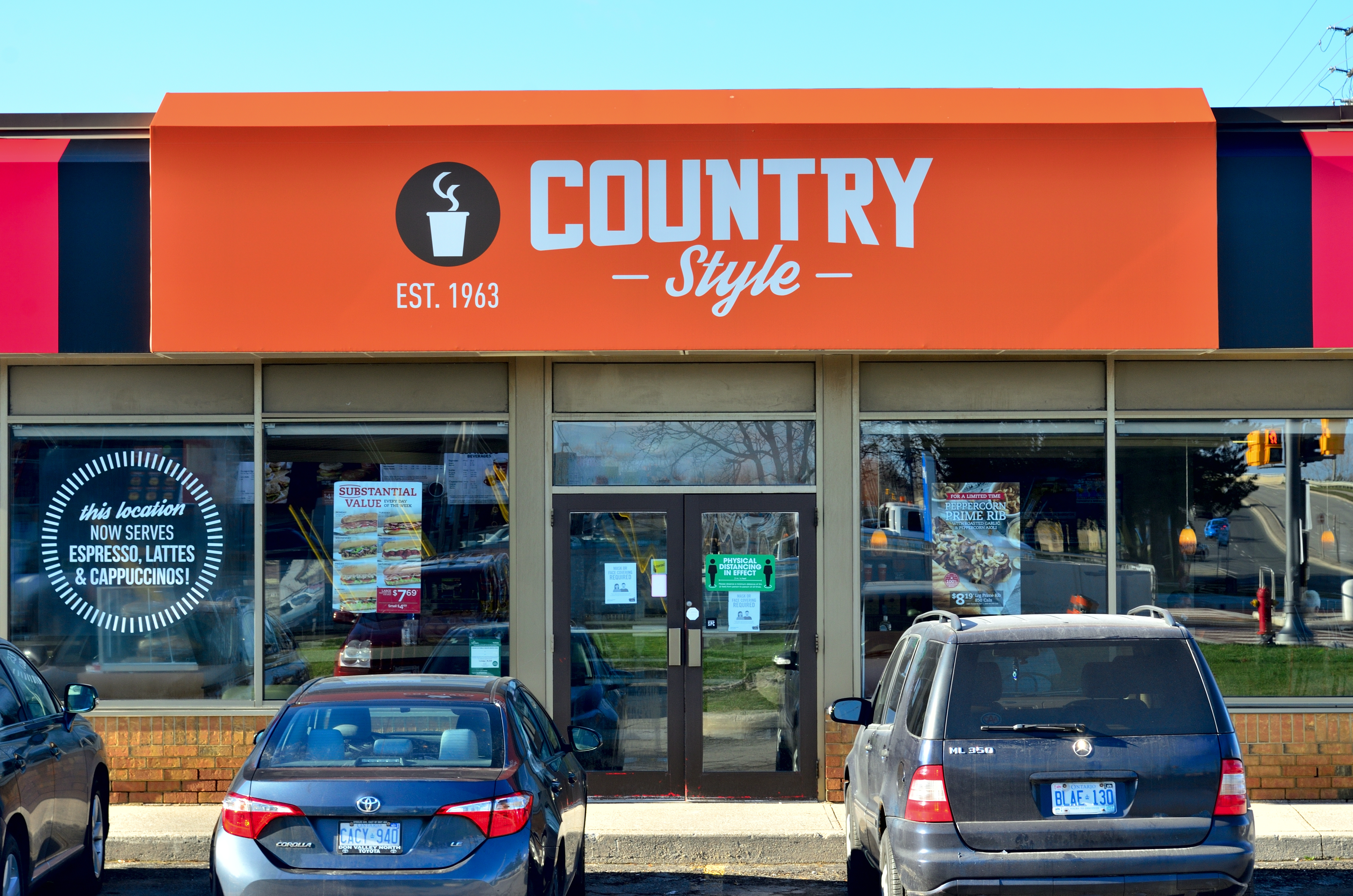
Country Style in Richmond Hill

Country Style Food Services, Inc., formerly Country Style Donuts, is a fast/casual chain of coffee shops operating primarily in the Canadian province of Ontario which serves oatmeal, soup, sandwiches, salads, baked goods including donuts, and coffee. The chain is based in Richmond Hill, Ontario.

== Organization ==
In January 2006, there were 120 "traditional" locations in Ontario. There are over 420 "non-traditional" locations embedded in other stores such as gas stations, convenience stores, arenas and movie theatres. Over 70% of customer purchases in 2001 were coffee. In total, Country Style has over 1,000 locations in Ontario, Western Canada, Nova Scotia, Prince Edward Island and New Brunswick under the Country Style/Bistro name.

== History ==
Country Style has been in business since 1963 when it opened its first location in Toronto. Country Style experienced a lot of growth early on, opening 100 stores in the first 15–20 years of existence. It had 50 outlets in 1974 when it was the leading coffee and donut establishment in Canada above Tim Hortons (which passed it two years later). It began to expand into Western Canada in the 1970s (including Vancouver and Calgary) and the East in the early 1980s. Poor results caused the franchise to withdraw from these regions: locations in Alberta were the only ones to survive into the 1990s, while in the East, it was ones in Nova Scotia and PEI.

By 2001, Country Style had been forced to close a quarter of its stores due to decreasing market share in an increasingly competitive Canadian market. Since then, it has opened many new stores and now ranks third behind Tim Hortons and McDonald's in the Canadian coffee market. On November 1, 2011, its parent company, MTY Food Group, bought Mr. Sub for $23 million merging it with Country style to become Country Style Food Services Holdings Inc.

In the mid-1990s, the Country Style logo was changed to use a font similar to Palatino instead of its former handwriting font.

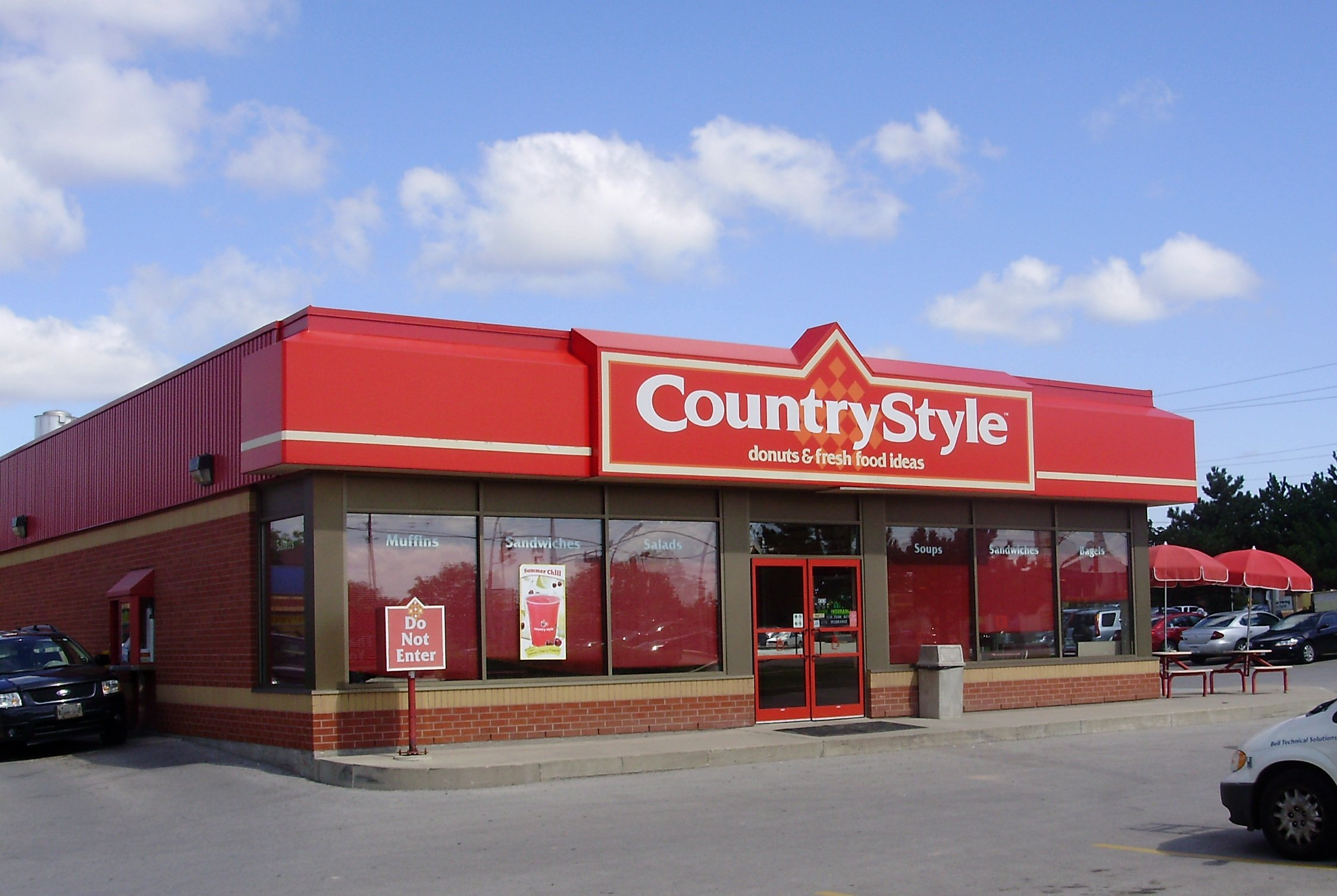
A Country Style location in Milton, Ontario, with mid-1990s branding

In 2006, Country Style changed its image to a more upscale style: "Country Style Bistro Deli". The new image includes a new logo, a new website, and an enhanced branded deli menu that will be phased into all stores. The logo still uses the Palatino style font and will also be phased into all stores. New stores will feature more modern design features, somewhat similar to Starbucks, and provides wide range of wraps, smoothies, breakfast, salads and sweets. In 2009, the brand rights to Country Style, used at 900 locations, were purchased by MTY Food Group of Montreal for $14.6 million in cash and debt.

In 2017, the stores in the Philippine franchise were rebranded to "New Bistro Deli".

== Charity work ==
In April 2003, Country Style partnered with the Make a Wish Foundation as its corporate charity of choice.

== See also ==
- List of coffeehouse chains
- List of fast-food chains in Canada
