= Pacifique Plante =

Canadian lawyer (1907–1976)

Pacifique Plante (1907 – August 9, 1976 in Guadalajara, Mexico) was a crime fighting Montreal lawyer from the 1940s to the 1950s. He was also known as Pax Plante.

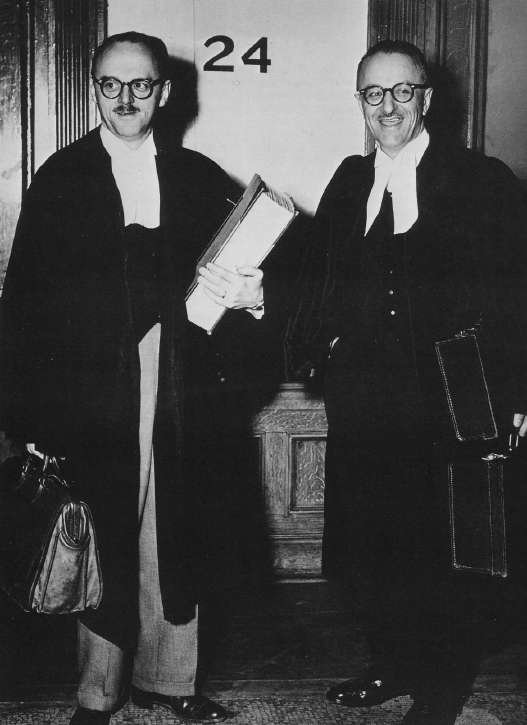
Jean Drapeau and Pacifique Plante, 1954

Between 1940 and 1950, he waged war against organized crime, vice and corruption in Montreal. In 1948, Plante denounced corruption inside the police force. With the help of the journalist Gérard Pelletier, he published about sixty articles in Le Devoir between November 28, 1949, and February 18, 1950, under the title Montréal sous le règne de la pègre, in which he affirmed that police "protection" encouraged the activities of the underworld. With Jean Drapeau, he acted as counsel at the Caron Inquiry, a judicial inquiry into the Montreal police that held hearings from September 1950 to April 1953. In his judgment of October 8, 1954, Judge François Caron blamed about twenty police officers, including both police directors of the period, Fernand Dufresne and Albert Langlois. They were fined and declared ineligible for municipal office.

== Books about Plante ==
The non-fiction book City Unique by William Weintraub deals with his fight against vice in Montreal. The book has won a QSPELL Award.

- Pax lutte à finir avec la pègre - Alain Stanké
