= Robin's Donuts =

Canadian fast food chain

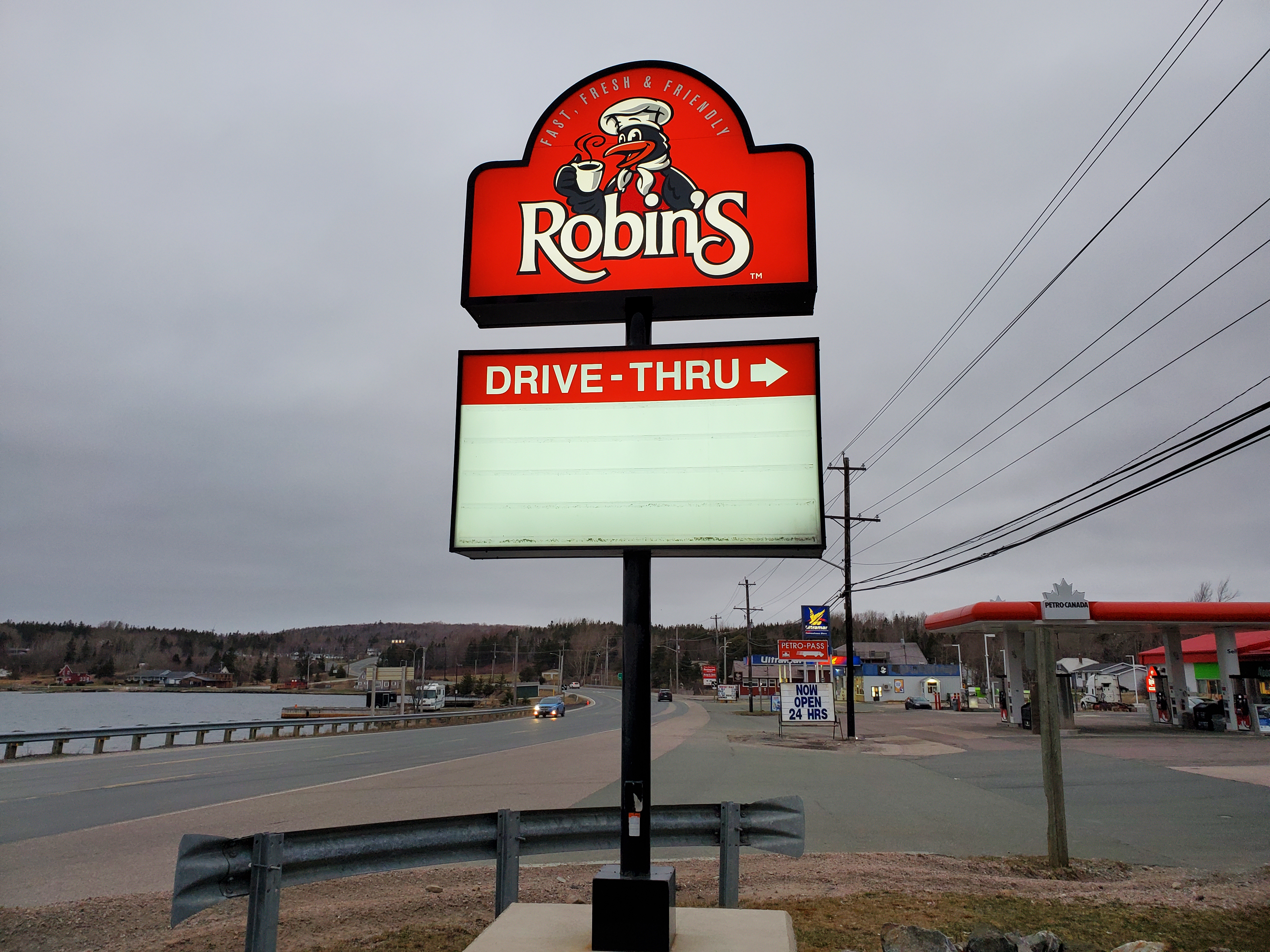
- Robin's in Bras d'Or, Cape Breton
- Company type: Private Franchise
- Industry: Restaurants
- Founded: Thunder Bay, Ontario, Canada (1975; 51 years ago)
- Headquarters: Thunder Bay, Ontario, Canada
- Number of locations: 160+
- Area served: Atlantic Canada, Northwestern Ontario, Manitoba, Southern Saskatchewan
- Products: Baked goods Beverages; Whole-bean coffee Soup; Sandwiches
- Owner: Chairman's Brand Corporation
- Website: robinsdonuts.com

Robin's Donuts (commonly shortened to Robin's) is a Canadian chain of over 160 fast food restaurants that operate in every province of Canada except Alberta, British Columbia, and Quebec. A 2017 Maclean's Magazine Poll ranked Robin's as the 7th best coffee chain out of 15 in Canada.

== History ==
Harvey Cardwell and George Spicer opened the first store in 1975 in Thunder Bay, Ontario as "Robin's Donuts".

In October 2006, Chairman's Brand Corporation took ownership of Robin's Donuts when it purchased Afton Food Group, the former owner of Robin's Donuts, 241 Pizza and Mrs. Powell's Cinnamon Buns.

In 2014 a new logo was created which dropped "Donuts" from the name; this is likely because of the growing number of alternative new menu items.

On September 26, 2024, Robin's announced plans to expand once again in the Southern Ontario market; a market where it closed most of its locations in the early 2000s due to increased competition from rival Tim Hortons.

== See also ==
- List of Canadian restaurant chains
- List of coffeehouse chains
- List of doughnut shops
- List of fast-food chains in Canada
