= Mary Brown's =

Canadian fast food restaurant chain

Mary Brown's Chicken

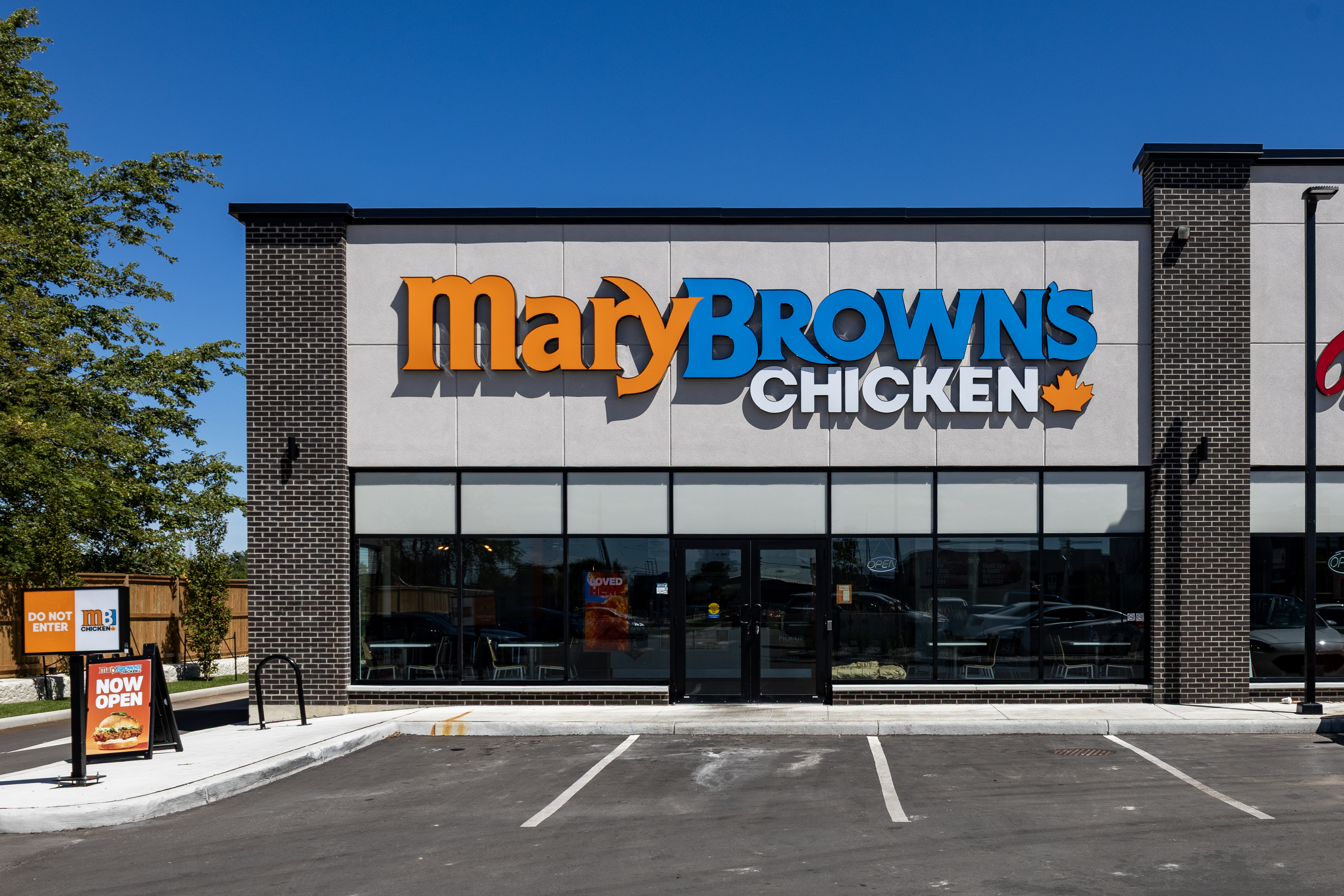
- A Mary Brown's restaurant in Essex, Ontario
- Type: Private
- Industry: Casual dining Fast food
- Founded: 1969; 57 years ago in St. John's, Newfoundland and Labrador, Canada
- Founders: Pat Tarrant; Cyril Fleming
- Headquarters: Markham, Ontario, Canada
- Number of locations: Approx. 300
- Area served: Canada; United Kingdom; Mexico; India; Pakistan
- Key people: Gregory Roberts (Owner/CEO); Tony Samuelsson (COO); Lou Russo (Senior VP of Operations)
- Number of employees: Approx. 3,100
- Parent: MBI Brands
- Website: http://www.marybrowns.com

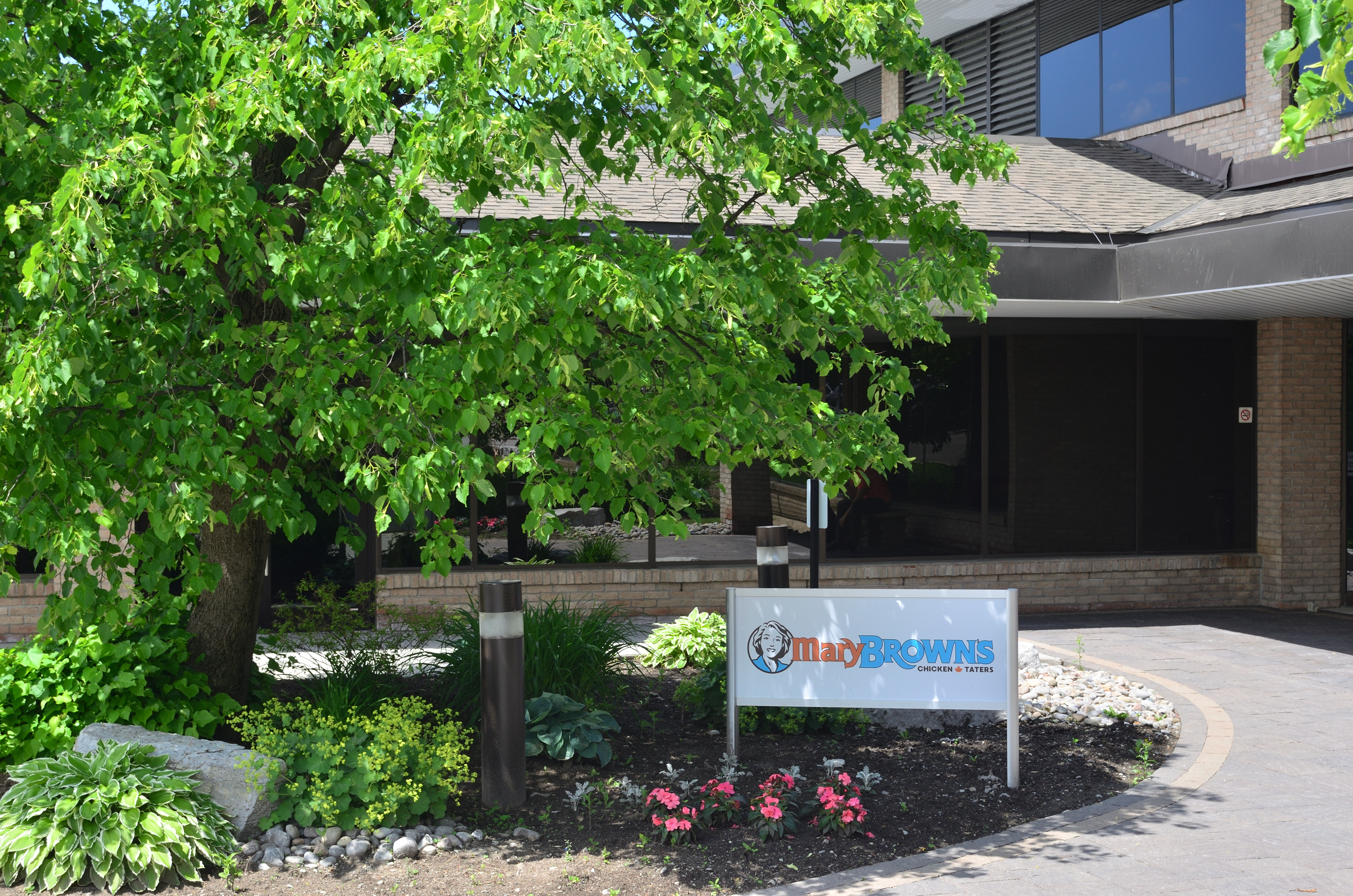
Mary Brown's headquarters in Markham

Mary Brown's Chicken (MB Chicken) is a Canadian fast food restaurant chain specializing in fried chicken. It operates approximately 300 locations across Canada.

== History ==
In 1969, Pat Tarrant and Cyril Fleming purchased rights to open up the first Canadian Golden Skillet fried chicken franchise (originally from Richmond, Virginia) in Newfoundland. The first location was located in St. John's Avalon Mall. However, Tarrant and Fleming were forced to rename the establishment for legal reasons. It was eventually renamed Mary Brown's Virginia Fried Chicken, after Mary Brown Guthrie (1909–1955), the wife of Golden Skillet owner and founder Clifton W. Guthrie. According to the company, Mary Brown, who was from Petersburg, Virginia, was the creator of the chain's proprietary recipe for American Southern-fried chicken; the recipe was sold to Tarrant and Fleming in 1969.

By 1972, Mary Brown's had grown beyond Newfoundland, opening locations in Oshawa and Mississauga in the Greater Toronto Area. From there, the chain expanded west to Alberta, throughout the remaining Atlantic Provinces, then to Manitoba and Saskatchewan. More recently, Mary Brown's has opened several locations in British Columbia, and a store in Yellowknife, Northwest Territories. The brand continues to grow across Canada.

In 2022, Mary Brown's acquired Fat Bastard Burrito, a premium burrito chain founded in 2010 in Toronto, Canada, with at least 92 locations throughout Ontario. In that same year, Mary Brown's was named Company of The Year by Foodservice and Hospitality Magazine.

In 2024, the company opened their first restaurant outside Canada at Lisburn in Northern Ireland exclusively under the abbreviated name MB Chicken; they have opened a second location in Belfast. They also intended to open locations in the rest of the UK, India, Pakistan, and Mexico in 2024. They plan to open another 300 to 400 international locations in the next five years.

== Franchises and corporate stores ==
Mary Brown's currently operates approximately 300 stores within Canada. Mary Brown's has 21 corporate stores. The balance of its stores, about 249, are franchised and located throughout Canada.

Mary Brown's has been a member of the Canadian Franchise Association for over 35 years. The establishment was awarded the Canadian Franchisees’ Choice Award nine years consecutively. In 2019, 2020, and 2021, Mary Brown's was named one of the Best Managed Companies in Canada by Deloitte Canada.

== Management ==
The owner of Mary Brown's is Gregory Roberts of PI Enterprises Group, an entrepreneur and chartered accountant from Triton, Newfoundland and Labrador. Roberts acquired the brand in 2007 and since that time, has grown the chain from about 67 stores to its current count of approximately 300 stores.

The president and COO of Mary Brown's from 2018 to 2024 was Hadi Chahin, a 20-year plus executive of the food services industry. Prior to joining Mary Brown's, Chahin was the vice president of operations for Chartwells, a division of Compass Group Canada. He also held leadership roles with Sodexo Canada, Prime Restaurants and White Lodging Services.

Tony Samuelson, a longtime senior employee of the brand, was named CEO of the company in 2024. He previously held the titles of Global Chief Development Officer, and vice-president of Operations.

== Marketing ==
The original slogan, which was discontinued in the 1990s, was "Mary Brown has the BEST LEGS IN TOWN!"

Mary Brown's now uses the slogans "Made Fresh from Scratch" and "100% Canadian" in their materials. "Crave Delicious" has become the brand's overriding tagline since mid-2019.

"Made Fresh from Scratch" is a reflection of the brand's preparation methods, focusing on fresh rather than frozen chicken. Mary Brown's use the word "handcrafted" to express how they prepare their food.

"Truly Canadian" was adopted as a slogan in 2017 to reflect the brand's heritage as a Newfoundland-founded, Canadian-owned business. Company materials note that the company is family-owned and operated by Canadians, and sells Canada Grade A chicken raised by Canadian farmers.

Mary Brown's original logo was developed in the 1970s and updated in 2000. In late 2017, the logo underwent a refresh as part of a more complete rebranding.

In April 2020, in the midst of the COVID-19 pandemic in Canada, Mary Brown's sponsored the temporary removal of all paywalls from Postmedia Network newspaper websites for the month.

In October 2021, Mary Brown's acquired the naming rights to the Mile One Centre in St. John's, in a 10-year deal valued at $1.5 million.

In May 2024, Mary Brown's started their operations in Pakistan by opening up two branches in the city of Lahore; branches are soon opening up in Karachi and Islamabad.

== See also ==
- List of Canadian restaurant chains
- List of fast-food chains in Canada
- List of fast-food chicken restaurants
