= Red-Light District, Montreal =

Red-Light District
- Neighbourhood
- Quartier du Red-Light
- Location of the Red-Light District in Montreal
- Coordinates: 45.509873°N 73.563768°W
- Country: Canada
- Province: Quebec
- City: Montreal
- Borough: Ville-Marie
- Postal Code: H2X, H2Z, H3A
- Area codes: 514, 438

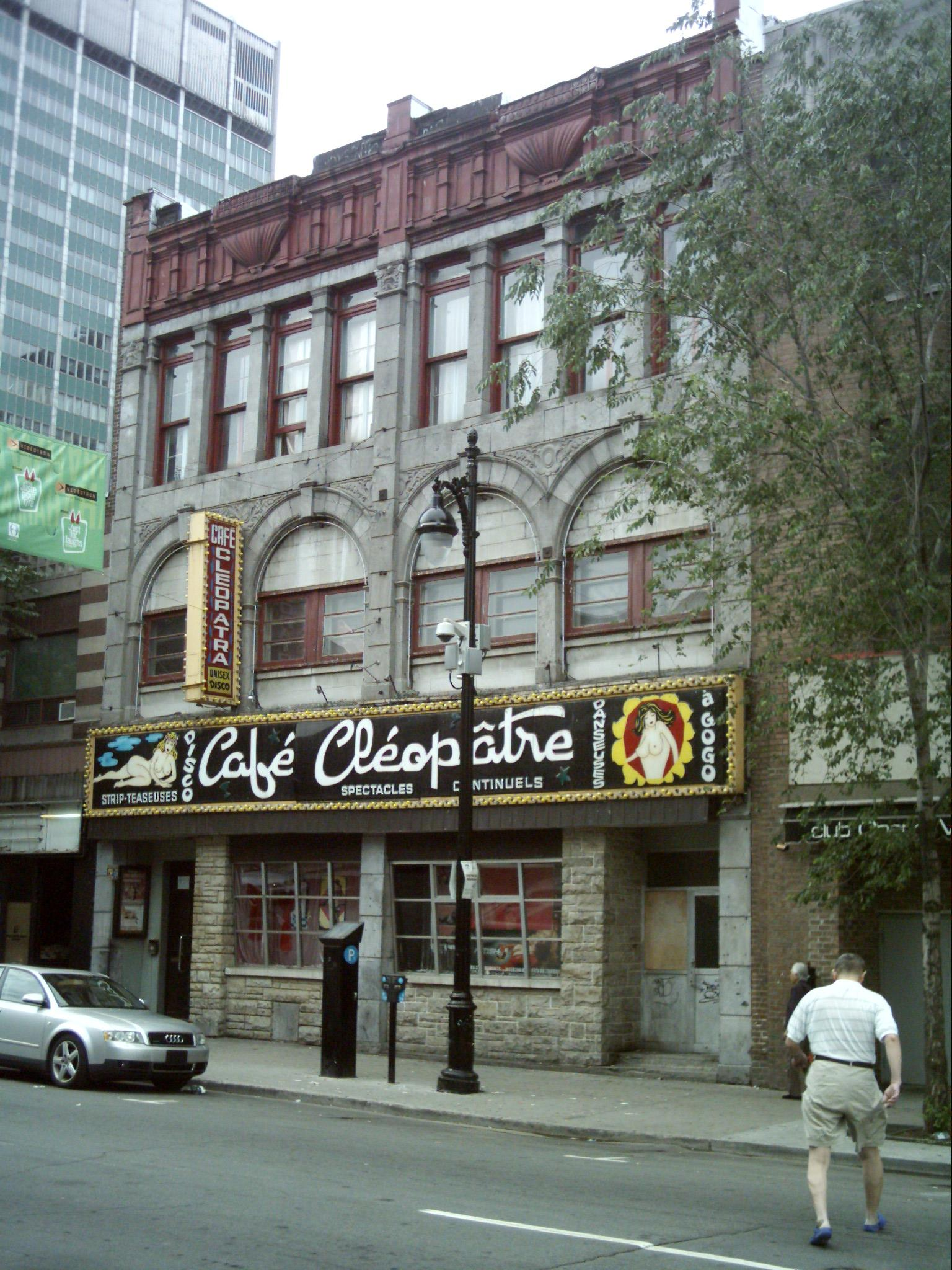
The Café Cléopâtre, 1230 Saint Laurent Boulevard.

The Red-Light District (French: Quartier du Red Light) of Montreal, Quebec, Canada was formerly centred on the intersection of Saint Laurent Boulevard and Saint Catherine Street in the borough of Ville-Marie.

The neighbourhood has historically been home to cabarets and illegal businesses as early as the mid-19th century, but especially between 1925 and early 1960s. The term Red Light recalls the old lantern on the doors of brothels. Gambling, illicit taverns, and prostitution have marked the history of this area, also related to prohibition in the United States and Montreal's status as a port city. Today, there are still traces of this type of activity, but it is much more discreet.

The variety shows that took place in the neighbourhood launched the careers of several foreign artists and was equally the starting point for many local artists. There still remain some strip clubs and cabarets in the area, such as the Café Cleopatre, threatened with demolition in 2009 by an urban renewal project linked to the nearby Quartier des spectacles. The Montreal Pool Room fast-food restaurant is also located there.

== Description ==
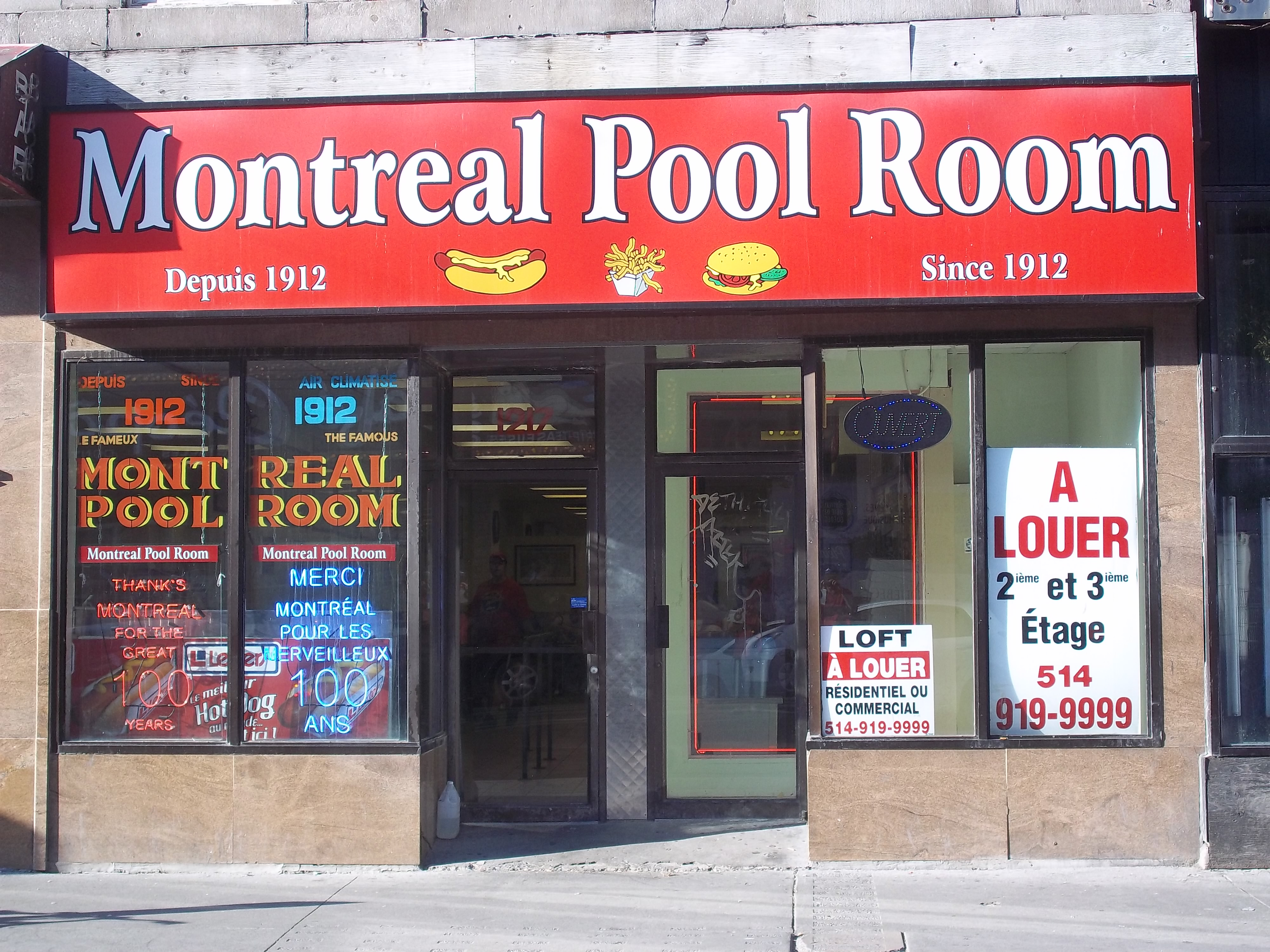
Montreal Pool Room at its new location across the street after its 2012 expropriation by the city of Montreal.

There is no official red-light district, although the definition of the boundaries has varied according to both the source and the time period. According to Viviane Namaste in 1973, it was bordered by René Lévesque Boulevard to the south, Sherbrooke Street to the north, Saint Laurent Boulevard to the west, and Saint Denis Street to the east. According to Daniel Proulx, it was defined early in the twentieth century by Sherbrooke Street to the north, Saint-Denis Street to the east, Bleury Street to the west, and by Old Montreal to the south. Proulx claims that today, it has shrunk to centre on the corner of Sainte-Catherine and Saint-Laurent, the area's historical heart.

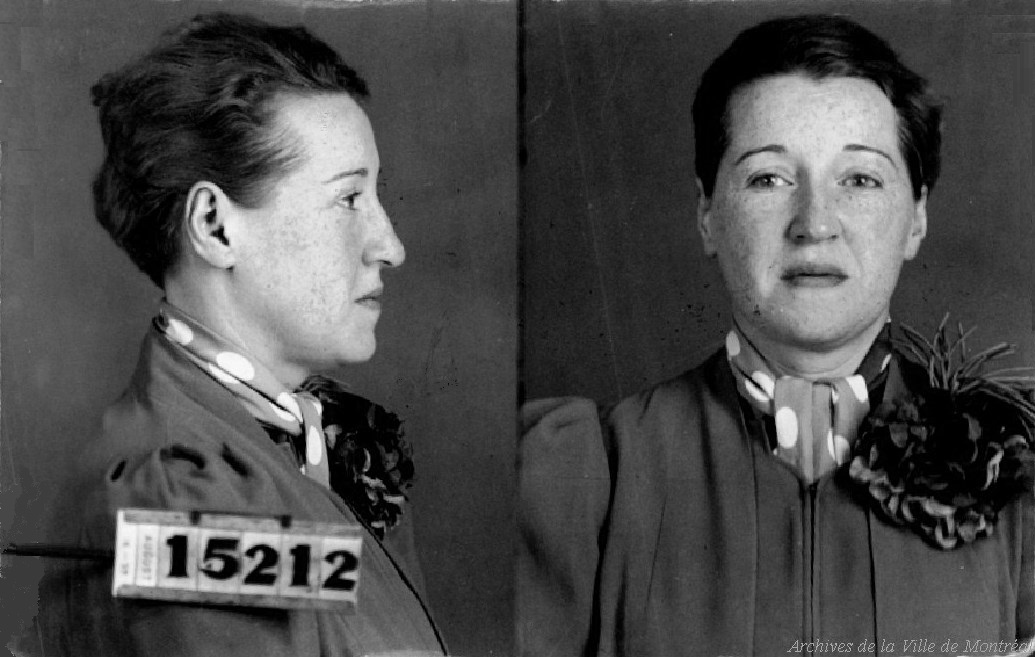
Anna Labelle, alias Madam Émile Beauchamp arrested in 1939, described as the most powerful madam in Montreal during World War II, regularly arrived at the courthouse in a Cadillac and mink fur.

"Venereal infections acquired in the city of Montreal" map of Montreal brothels, 1943

Prostitution, gambling and drinking were more prevalent in this area because of its proximity to the city centre, which is often a major tourist attraction, and the high density of liquor shops (taverns, bars, night clubs, cabarets, etc.).

The red-light district is used as a setting in the Kathy Reichs novel Déjà Dead, which is the first of twenty-one Temperance Brennan novels.

== See also ==
- Sexe de rue, a documentary film about the district
- The End of Pinky, an animated short set in the district
