= The Red Light District (theatre company) =

Canadian independent theatrical collective

The Red Light District is an independent theatrical collective based in Toronto, Ontario. The company was formed in 2006 by artistic directors Ted Witzel and Catherine Dunn with a mandate of staging radical adaptations of classic plays, both famous and forgotten.

The company is made up mostly of a group of actors who met while training at the University of Toronto's University College Drama Program.

The Red Light District's inaugural production was presented in August 2007 and was an adaptation of Shakespeare's Titus Andronicus which used both Shakespeare's text and German playwright Heiner Müller's 1984 adaptation, ANATOMY TITUS FALL OF ROME.

In August 2008, the Red Light District presented Polish writer Witold Gombrowicz's 1935 play, Ivona, Princess of Burgundia at the Gladstone Hotel in Toronto's Queen Street West district.

In January 2009, the company mounted a production of surrealist playwright Yvan Goll's Methusalem, or the Eternal Bourgeois, staged at the Whippersnapper Gallery in Little Italy.

Most recently, in April 2009, the Red Light District staged a production of Molière's satirical play The Misanthrope at the Drake Hotel, directed by German director Johanna Schall. Schall used British poet Tony Harrison's translation. The production sold out many performances and received stellar reviews from Eye Weekly, the National Post and NOW.
