= Décarie Hot Dogs =

Hot dog restaurant in Montreal, Quebec, Canada

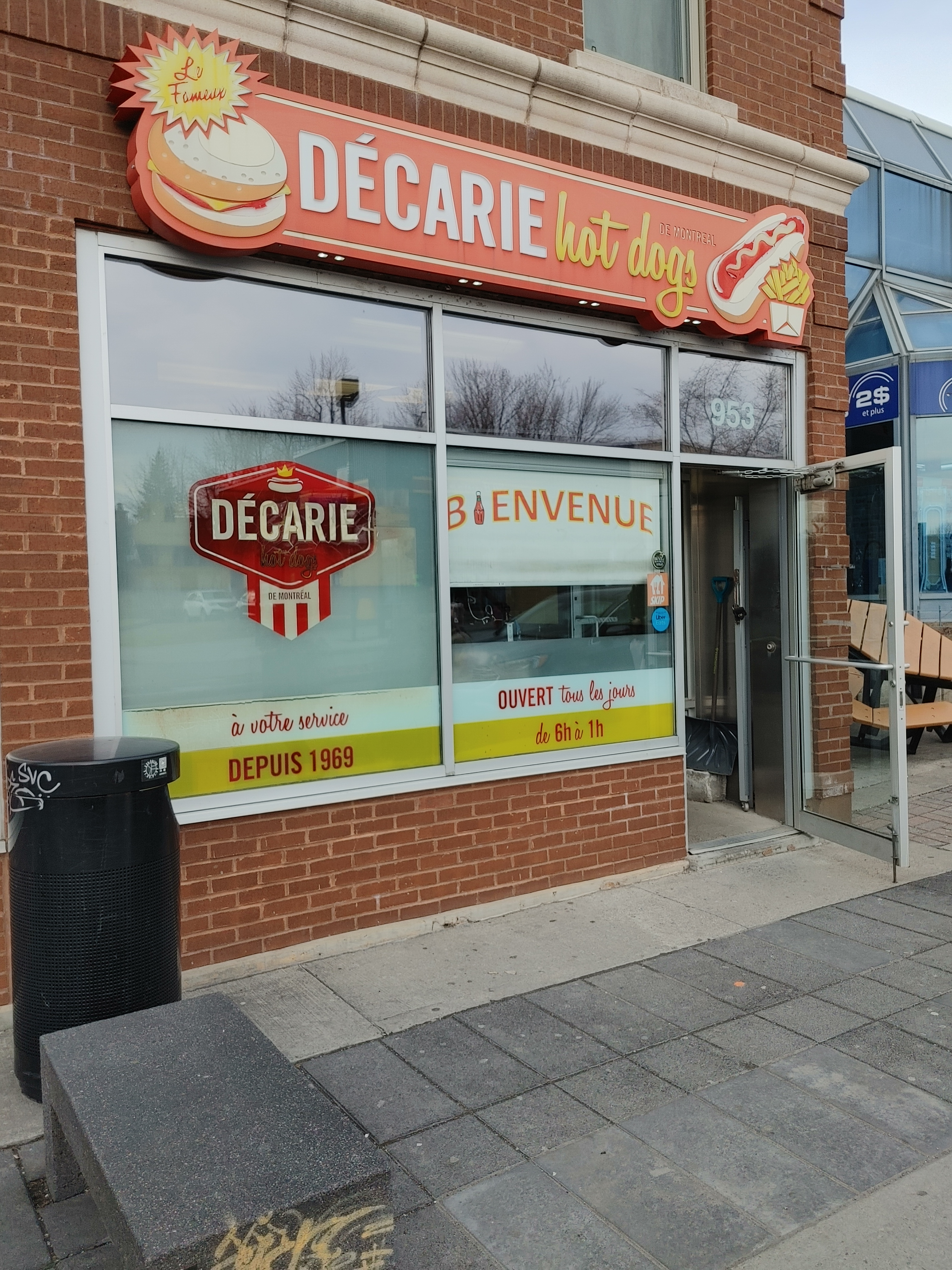
- Storefront after 2010s facade modernization

- Location within Montreal

Restaurant information
- Established: 1969
- Food type: North American-Quebecois fast food / Greasy spoon / Diner
- Location: 953 Décarie Boulevard, Saint-Laurent; Burough of Montreal; Greater Montreal, Quebec, H4L 3M3, Canada
- Coordinates: 45.513620°N 73.681446°W
- Seating capacity: 7 + standing room + 16 patio

Décarie Hot Dogs, founded in 1969, is a diner counter restaurant located on Décarie Boulevard in the Saint-Laurent district of Montreal, Quebec, Canada. It specializes in hot dogs and french fries.

The restaurant is locally famed for its fries, poutine and Montreal-style steamies with some reviewers claiming it has the best poutines in the city, or even country. In addition it is reputed for having some of the best hot dogs in Montreal, and appeared in at least one guide book about Montreal.

Being a local landmark, several well-known locals have eaten at the restaurant, including Rene Angelil, mayors of Montreal and Saint-Laurent, Stephane Dion (former leader of the Liberal Party of Canada) and pro-athletes of local teams. Celebrating its 50th anniversary in 2019, the Vriniotis family, who established the eatery and still operates it, has managed to retain the same menu for half a century except for the addition of poutine in 1984. Limited renovations were done to the restaurant for its anniversary.

The restaurant, which is across the street from Place Rodolphe-Rousseau public square, is housed in a century old building that features a full wall mural painted by Dodo Ose. The artwork, titled L'Envol, was done as a collaboration between the artist, the city of Saint-Laurent and the owners of Décarie Hot Dogs—the Vriniotis family; made to represent the owners' Greek heritage with the mythological topic of Pegasi.
