= Lafleur Restaurants =

Canadian chain of fast food restaurants

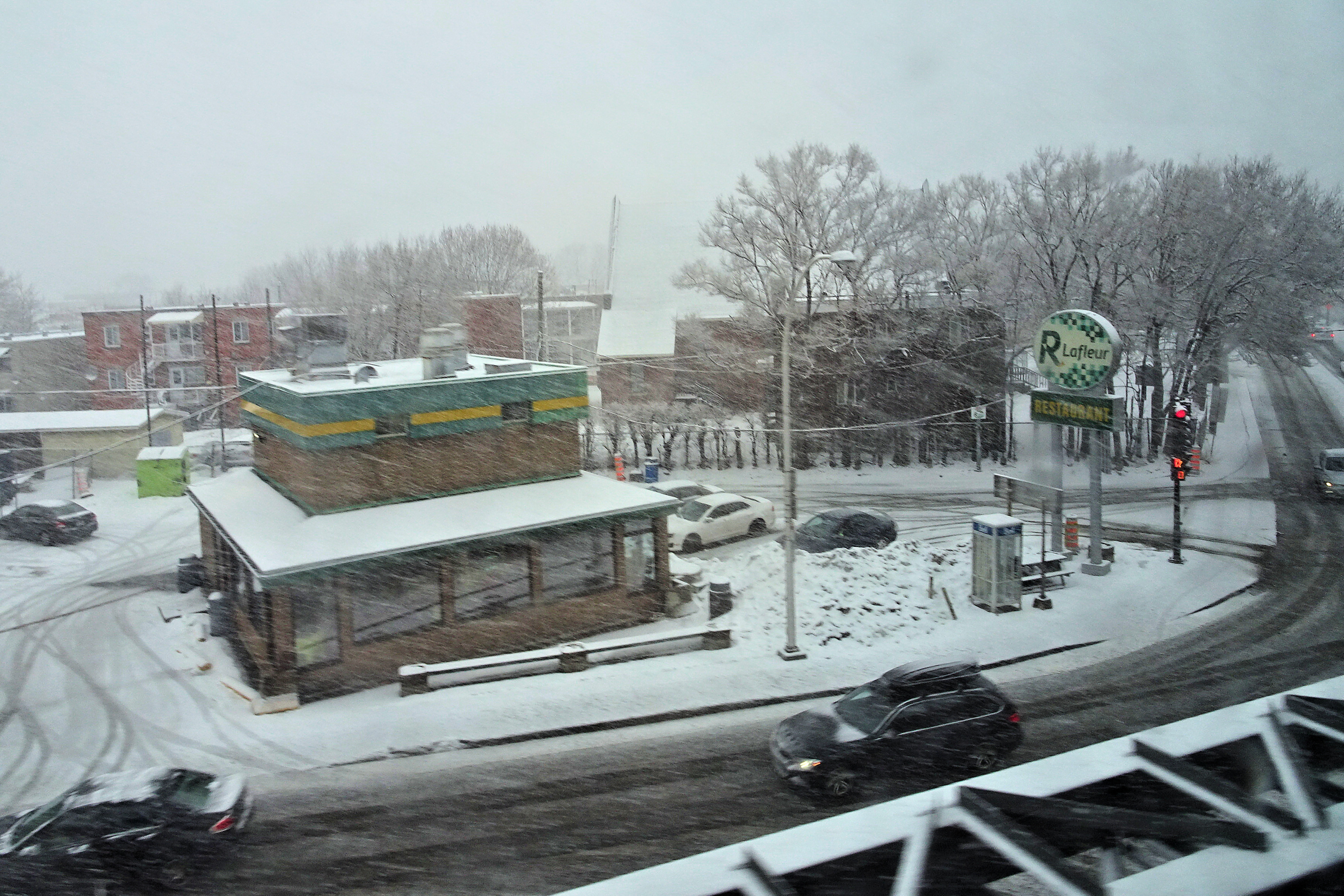
- Lafleur Restaurant in Ville Saint-Pierre
- Trade name: Lafleur Restaurant
- Native name: Resto Lafleur
- Company type: Private
- Industry: Food service
- Founded: 1951; 75 years ago on Avenue Lafleur in LaSalle, Quebec
- Founder: Denis Vinet
- Headquarters: Montreal, Quebec, Canada
- Number of locations: 17 (2019)
- Area served: Greater Montreal
- Products: Hot dogs, hamburgers, smoke meat sandwiches, poutine, french fries
- Owner: Denis Vinet
- Website: Official website

Lafleur Restaurants (in French: Resto Lafleur) is a chain of family-owned fast food restaurants located in the greater Montreal area.

== History ==
The business began in 1951 on Avenue Lafleur in LaSalle, Quebec (in the Montreal area). It was set up by Denis Vinet who had spent the previous ten years selling hot dogs and french fries from a van in LaSalle. The business gradually grew into a Montreal-wide chain.

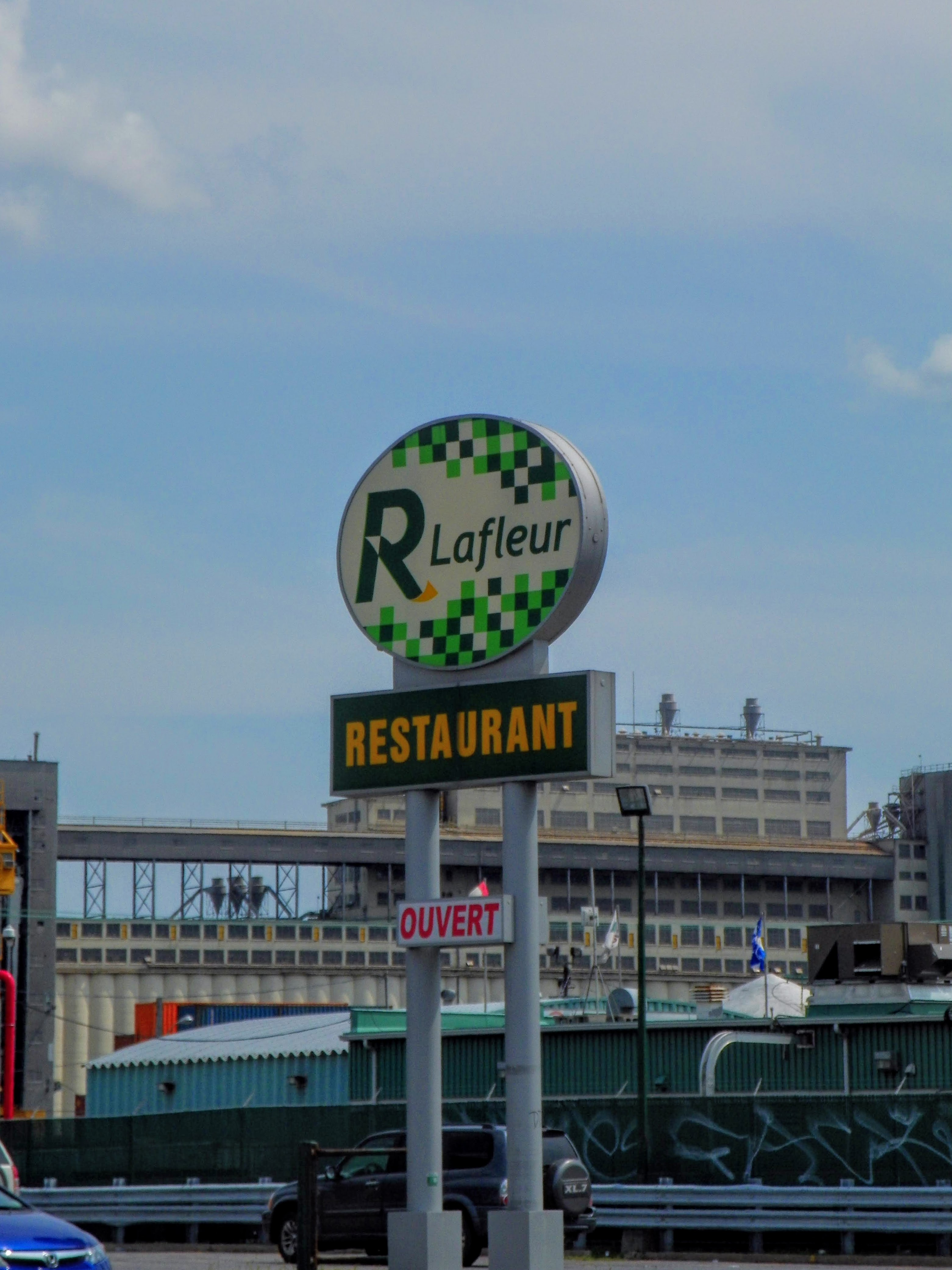
Port of Montreal location's sign.

== Fare ==
Lafleur is widely known for serving for its hot dogs, hamburgers, french fries and poutine. It is particularly known for its hot dog dishes.

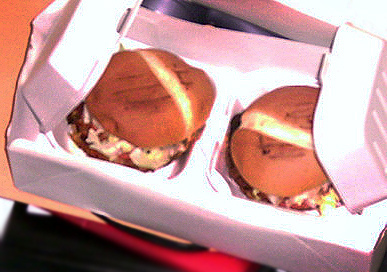
Veggie burgers on the menu.

== See also ==
- List of Canadian restaurant chains
- La Belle Province (restaurant)
- Dic Ann's Hamburgers
- Valentine (restaurant)
