= Giles Pellerin =

American businessman (1906–1998)

Giles L. "Bud" Pellerin (December 23, 1906 – November 21, 1998), nicknamed the Superfan or Super Fan, was an American telephone company executive, USC alumnus, and a fan of the University of Southern California Trojans (USC) college football team, notable for having attended 797 consecutive USC football games over a period of 74 years until his death at age 91. This record was made all the more remarkable by the fact that Pellerin hated flying and, whenever possible, drove or rode the train or bus to every game he attended. He was inducted into the USC Athletic Hall of Fame in 1995.

Pellerin's streak began in 1925, while he was still a student at USC (he graduated in 1930). During his streak he attended USC games in 75 stadiums in over 50 cities. Until his death, he had watched every game played in USC's major football rivalries, including 68 games with UCLA and 69 games with Notre Dame. He had seen the introduction of USC icons such as Traveler in 1961 and Tommy Trojan in 1930. He had witnessed all but one of USC's bowl games, including the regular-season Mirage Bowl in Tokyo, Japan in 1985. During his streak USC went 532-225-40, winning nine national championships, and played under ten different head coaches.

Pellerin never played football himself. A resident of the Pasadena area for his entire life, he attended his first USC football game while still a student at Huntington Park High School, going to the 1923 Rose Bowl Game in which USC defeated Penn State. It was USC's first appearance in the Rose Bowl and Pellerin would go on to see the Trojans' next 27 appearances as well. In his private life, Pellerin married and became a successful executive with Pacific Telephone Company, completing his career in the 1960s as director of a computerized billing office in Orange, California with a staff of 450 female and 7 male employees. He delayed his own 1935 honeymoon by eight months in order to combine it with a USC football road game (against the University of Hawaii in Honolulu) and donated over US$1.3 million to the university to endow four athletic scholarships: three for football and one for swimming. Pellerin claimed to have traveled over 650,000 miles and spent $85,000 to attend the games in his streak. In 1949, he walked out of a hospital just five days after an appendectomy to attend a home game, telling nurses that he was going for a walk.

USC embraced Pellerin and began including his story in their annual football media guide. By the 1990s he had become a subject for many sports journalists, including stories in USA Today and Sports Illustrated and on the ABC Network. In 1995, Pellerin was enshrined in the USC Athletic Hall of Fame as part of the second class of inductees. He won the first annual Sears Diehard Fan Award as "America's NCAA Division I Diehard College Sports Fan" in 1996.

== Death ==
Pellerin died during the 1998 UCLA–USC rivalry game. During the game, he felt ill and asked his next-younger brother, Oliver Pellerin, who was attending the game with him, to take him home. As he was being brought outside, he died of cardiac arrest in the parking lot of the Rose Bowl, which was coincidentally the same location where he attended his first USC game.

His younger brothers also had long streaks. Oliver viewed 637 consecutive games (1945–2001), dying in 2002 at age 93; the youngest, Max Pellerin, at one point had a streak of 300+, dying in 2001 at age 91.
