= Groupe Valentine Inc. =

Canadian Restaurant Franchise Chain

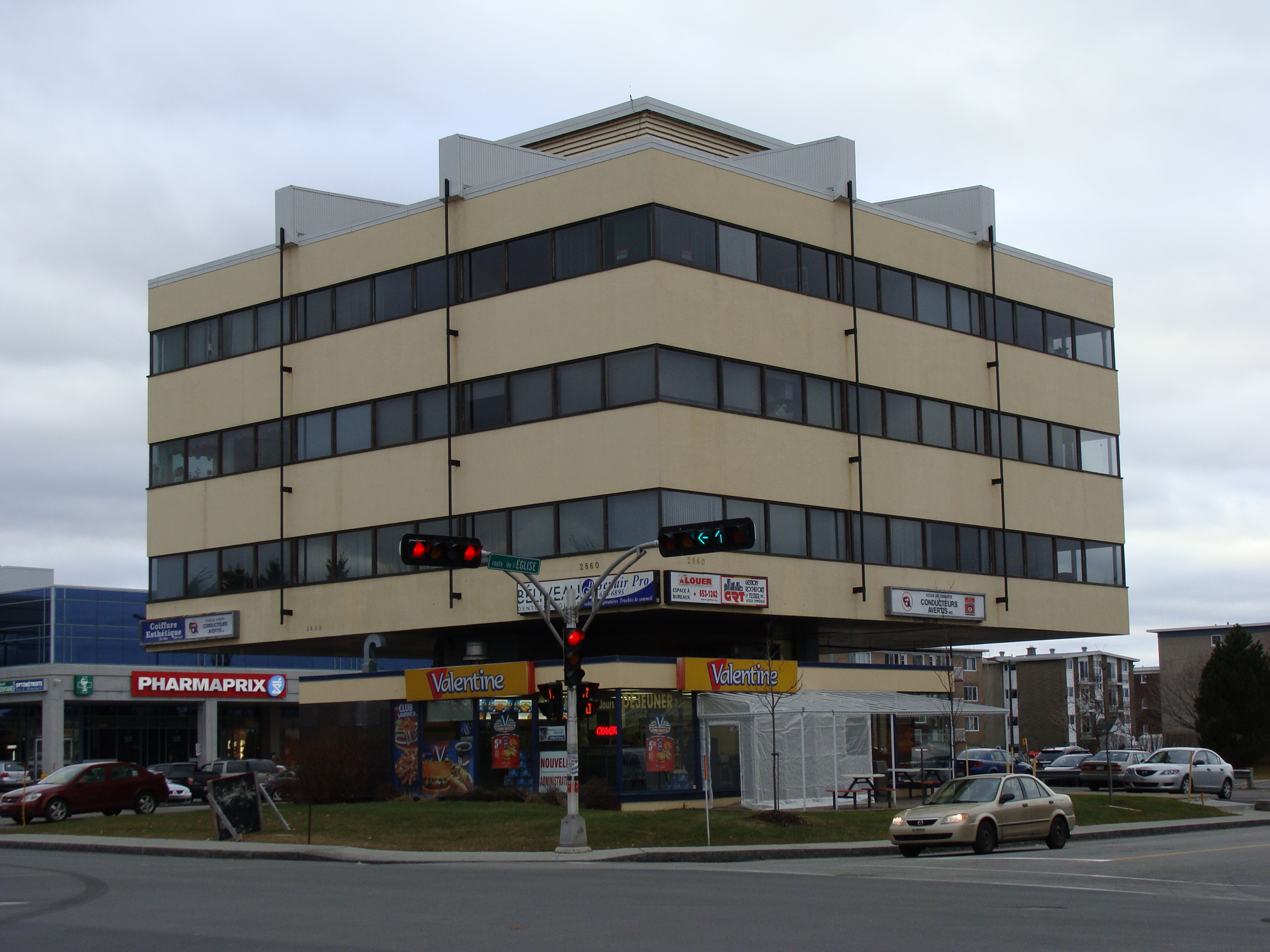
- A former Valentine location at an office building in Quebec City.
- Company type: Wholly owned subsidiary
- Industry: Restaurants Franchising
- Founded: 1979; 47 years ago in Saint-Hyacinthe, Quebec, Canada
- Founder: Jean-Pierre Robin
- Headquarters: Saint-Hyacinthe, Quebec, Canada
- Number of locations: 95
- Area served: Quebec
- Key people: Jean-Pierre Robin, President
- Products: Fast food
- Revenue: $29 million
- Parent: MTY Food Group (2010–present)
- Website: valentine.ca

Valentine is a Canadian chain of over 100 privately owned restaurant franchises operating in the province of Quebec, Canada. In September 2010 it became a subsidiary of MTY Food Group which purchased the brand rights for $9.3 million.

== History ==
The first restaurant opened in 1979 in Saint-Hyacinthe, Quebec. A few years later, its founder, Jean-Pierre Robin, opened a second restaurant in Saint-Hyacinthe in order to meet the demand for its "famous hot-dogs". The chain's success increased and reached a turning point: the brothers opted for franchising as the company's mode of functioning for its future restaurants. As time passed, more franchises were sold and restaurants open throughout Quebec. During the 1990s, the chain underwent a major renewal plan in which the restaurants' design changed along with the company's colours.

The company's fare is typical Canadian fast food, such as burgers, fries, sandwiches and poutine. The company employs humour in its advertising. It offers an app that records footsteps. After 10,000 steps, the user is eligible for a poutine.
