= List of fast food restaurant chains =

This is a list of notable current and former fast food restaurant chain stores, as well as some fast casual restaurants, pizzerias (also see List of pizza chains), and coffeehouses (also see List of coffeehouse chains). See list here for ice cream parlors (see List of ice cream parlor chains).

== International chains ==
- 85°C Bakery Cafe
- A&W Restaurants
- Arby's
- Auntie Anne's
- Big Boy Restaurants
- Blaze Pizza
- Booster Juice
- Burger King
- Carl's Jr.
- Chefette
- Chick-fil-A
- Church's Texas Chicken / Texas Chicken
- Cinnabon
- Dairy Queen
- Dave's Hot Chicken
- Dodo Pizza
- Domino's
- Dunkin' Donuts
- Five Guys
- Hardee's
- Hesburger
- Jollibee
- KFC
- Krispy Kreme
- Little Caesars
- Long John Silver's
- Marco's Pizza
- Max Hamburgers
- McDonald's
- Nordsee
- Panda Express
- Panera
- Papa John's
- Peter Piper Pizza
- Pita Pit
- The Pizza Company
- Pizza Hut
- Pizza Inn
- Pollo Campero
- Pollo Tropical
- Popeyes
- Quiznos
- Raising Cane's Chicken Fingers
- Sbarro
- Subway
- Sweet Frog
- Taco Bell
- TCBY
- Tim Hortons
- Wendy's
- Wetzel's Pretzels
- Whataburger
- Wienerschnitzel
- Wingstop
- WingStreet

== Companies by country/region of origin ==
=== Africa ===
==== Egypt ====
- Cook Door

==== Nigeria ====
- Chicken Republic
- Kilimanjaro
- Mr Bigg's
- Tantalizers
- Tastee Fried Chicken

==== South Africa ====
- Chicken Licken
- Hungry Lion
- Nando's
- Steers
- Wimpy

=== Asia ===
==== Bangladesh ====
- Cooper's Bakery
- Tasty Treat

==== China ====
- Da Niang Dumpling
- Dicos
- East Dawning
- Goubuli
- Kungfu
- Mixue Ice Cream & Tea
- Mr. Lee
- Xiabu Xiabu

==== Hong Kong ====
- Cafe de Coral
- Fairwood
- Maxim MX

==== India ====
- Adyar Anandha Bhavan
- Amul Restaurants
- Bikanervala
- Burgs
- Cafe Coffee Day
- California Burrito
- Darshini
- Goli Vada Pav
- Haldiram's
- Jumbo King
- Karachi Bakery
- Nirula's
- Saravana Bhavan
- Smokin' Joe's
- Vadilal
- Wow! Momo

==== Indonesia ====
- Bakmi GM
- CFC
- Es Teler 77
- Geprek Bensu
- HokBen
- J.CO Donuts & Coffee
- Kebab Turki Baba Rafi
- Klenger Burger
- Restoran Sederhana
- Richeese Factory

==== Japan ====
- Ajisen Ramen
- First Kitchen
- Freshness Burger
- Hokka Hokka Tei
- Hotto Motto
- Ichibanya
- Italian Tomato
- Kura
- Hama Sushi
- Sushiro
- Lotteria
- Marugame Seimen
- Matsuya Foods Co.
- MOS Burger
- Pepper Lunch
- Sukiya
- Sushiro
- Yoshinoya
- Saizeriya

==== Malaysia ====
- The Chicken Rice Shop
- Sushi King
- Kuai Lee Gee Happy Chicken
- Marrybrown
- Pelita Nasi Kandar
- Rotiboy
- Kedai Mee Celup Cik Yue
- Sate Kajang Haji Samuri
- Ramly
- Restoran Shah Maju
- NZ Curry House
- SCR
- Pak Mat Western
- Secret Recipe
- SugarBun

==== Philippines ====
- Chowking
- Greenwich Pizza
- Jollibee
- Mang Inasal
- Max's Restaurant
- Nacho King!
- Red Ribbon
- Shakey's Pizza
- Tokyo Tokyo
- Mesa

==== Saudi Arabia ====
- Al Baik
- Al Tazaj
- Kudu
- Maestro Pizza
- Shawarmer

==== Singapore ====
- Old Chang Kee
- Sakae Sushi

==== South Korea ====
- Angel-in-us
- Bonchon Chicken
- Caffe Bene
- KyoChon
- Lotteria
- Mom's Touch
- Mr. Pizza
- Paris Baguette
- Tom N Toms Coffee
- Tous les Jours
- A Twosome Place

==== Sri Lanka ====
- Crepe Runner

==== Taiwan ====
- 85°C Bakery Cafe
- Bafang Dumpling
- J&G Fried Chicken
- KLG
- Laya Burger
- TKK Fried Chicken

==== Thailand ====
- Café Amazon
- The Pizza Company

==== United Arab Emirates ====
- Al Farooj Fresh
- ChicKing
- Just Falafel

==== Vietnam ====
- Pizza 4P's

=== Europe ===
==== Belgium ====
- Quick

==== Bulgaria ====
- Aladin Foods
- Nedelya
- Pizza Lab

==== Finland ====
- Hesburger
- Rolls

==== France ====
- Brioche Dorée
- Flunch
- O'Tacos

==== Germany ====
- Ditsch
- Kochlöffel
- Nordsee

==== Greece ====
- Goody's

==== Iceland ====
- Metro

==== Ireland ====
- Abrakebabra
- Apache Pizza
- Eddie Rocket's
- Four Star Pizza
- O'Briens Irish Sandwich Bars
- Supermac's

==== Italy ====
- Spizzico
- Bun Burgers
- Spontini
- La Piadineria
- Autogrill

==== Netherlands ====
- FEBO
- New York Pizza

==== Norway ====
- Big Bite Submarines
- Peppes Pizza

==== Poland ====
- North Fish

==== Russia ====
- Teremok
- Vkusno i tochka

==== Spain ====
- Cervecería 100 Montaditos
- Rodilla
- Telepizza

==== Sweden ====
- Max Hamburgers
- Mister York
- Sibylla (fast food)

==== United Kingdom ====
- Barburrito
- Ben's Cookies
- Benjys
- Chicken Cottage
- Dixy Chicken
- Eat
- Franco Manca
- Greggs
- Harry Ramsden's
- itsu
- Leon
- Little Chef
- Millie's Cookies
- Morley's
- Pret a Manger
- Southern Fried Chicken
- Spudulike
- Tortilla
- Upper Crust
- Wasabi
- West Cornwall Pasty Company
- Wimpy
- YO! Sushi

=== North America ===
==== Barbados ====
- Chefette

==== Canada ====
- A&W
- barBURRITO Canada
- Booster Juice
- Burger Baron
- Boston Pizza
- Big Smoke Burger
- Chez Ashton
- Chicken Delight
- Coffee Time
- Cora
- Country Style
- Dixie Lee Fried Chicken
- East Side Mario's
- Edo Japan
- Extreme Pita
- Freshii
- Fryer's
- Greco Pizza
- Harvey's
- Hero Certified Burgers
- Jimmy the Greek
- The Keg
- Kelseys Original Roadhouse * KFC
- King of Donair
- La Belle Province
- Lafleur Restaurants
- Manchu Wok
- Mary Brown's Chicken
- Milestones Grill & Bar
- Montana's BBQ & Bar
- Mr. Sub
- Mucho Burrito
- New York Fries
- Pita Pit
- Pizza 73
- Pizza Pizza
- Pizza Nova
- Robin's Donuts
- Second Cup Café
- St-Hubert
- Swiss Chalet
- Thaï Express
- Tim Hortons
- Valentine
- White Spot
- Wild Wing
- Yogen Früz

==== Guatemala ====
- Pollo Campero

==== Mexico ====
- El Pollo Loco

==== Trinidad and Tobago ====
- Mario's Pizzeria
- Royal Castle

==== United States ====
- A&W
- Amato's
- Andy's Frozen Custard
- Arby's
- Arctic Circle Restaurants
- Arthur Treacher's
- Auntie Anne's
- Baja Fresh
- Barberitos
- Blake's Lotaburger
- Blimpie
- Bojangles
- Bonchon Chicken
- Braum's
- Burger King
- Burger Street
- BurgerFi
- Burgerville
- Captain D's Seafood Kitchen
- Carino's Italian
- Carl's Jr.
- Charleys Philly Steaks
- Checkers and Rally's
- Cheddar's Scratch Kitchen
- Chester's
- Chick-fil-A
- Chicken Express
- Church's Texas Chicken
- Cook Out
- Culver's
- Dairy Queen
- Dave's Hot Chicken
- Daylight Donuts
- Del Taco
- DiBella's
- Duchess
- Dunkin' Donuts
- Earth Burger
- Eegee's
- Einstein Bros. Bagels
- El Chico
- El Pollo Loco
- El Taco Tote
- Erbert & Gerbert's
- Farmer Boys
- Five Daughters Bakery
- Five Guys Burgers and Fries
- Fosters Freeze
- Freddy's Frozen Custard & Steakburgers
- Godfather's Pizza
- Gold Star Chili
- Golden Chick
- Good Times Burgers & Frozen Custard
- Green Burrito / Red Burrito
- Guthrie's
- The Habit Burger Grill
- The Halal Guys
- Hardee's
- Honey Dew Donuts
- Hooters
- Hot 'n Now
- Huddle House
- The Human Bean
- Hungry Howie's Pizza
- Hunt Brothers Pizza
- IHOP
- In-N-Out Burger
- Jack in the Box
- Jack's
- Jamba Juice
- Jason's Deli
- Jet's Pizza
- Jersey Mike's Subs
- Jim's Restaurants
- Jimmy John's
- Joe's Crab Shack
- Johnny Rockets
- Jollibee
- Kewpee
- KFC
- King's Seafood Company
- Krispy Kreme
- Krispy Krunchy Chicken
- Krystal
- L&L Hawaiian Barbecue
- LaMar's Donuts
- LaRosa's Pizzeria
- Le Pain Quotidien
- Ledo Pizza
- Lee's Famous Recipe Chicken
- Legal Sea Foods
- Lion's Choice
- Little Caesars Pizza
- Logan's Roadhouse
- Long John Silver's
- Maid-Rite
- Marco's Pizza
- McAlister's Deli
- McDonald's
- The Melting Pot
- Milo's Hamburgers
- Mister Donut
- MOD Pizza
- Moe's Southwest Grill
- Mooyah
- MrBeast Burger
- Mrs. Fields
- Mrs. Winner's Chicken & Biscuits
- Nathan's Famous
- Noodles & Company
- The Old Spaghetti Factory
- On the Border Mexican Grill & Cantina
- Orange Julius
- Original Tommy's
- Pal's
- Panera Bread
- Panda Express
- Papa Gino's
- Papa John's Pizza
- Papa Murphy's
- Paris Baguette
- Penguin Point
- Penn Station East Coast Subs
- Perkins Restaurant & Bakery
- Peter Piper Pizza
- Pieology
- Pizza Hut
- Pizza Inn
- Pizza Ranch
- Planet Smoothie
- Pollo Tropical
- Popeyes
- Port of Subs
- Portillo's
- Potbelly Sandwich Works
- Qdoba
- Quizno's Classic Subs
- Raising Cane's Chicken Fingers
- Rax
- Red Lobster
- Red Robin
- Rita's Italian Ice
- Robeks
- Romano's Macaroni Grill
- Rosati's
- Round Table Pizza
- Roy Rogers Restaurants
- Rubio's Coastal Grill
- Ruby Tuesday
- Runza
- Salad and Go
- Saladworks
- Saltgrass Steak House
- Sarku Japan
- Sbarro
- Schlotzsky's
- Seattle's Best Coffee
- Shake Shack
- Shakey's Pizza
- Shipley Do-Nuts
- Shoney's
- Sizzler
- Skyline Chili
- Slim Chickens
- Smashburger
- Smoothie King
- Sneaky Pete's
- Sonic Drive-In
- Spaghetti Warehouse
- Spangles
- Starbucks
- Steak Escape
- Steak 'n Shake
- Stir Crazy
- Subway
- SuperDeluxe
- Sweetgreen
- Swensen's
- Swensons
- Taco Bell
- Taco Bueno
- Taco Cabana
- Taco del Mar
- Taco John's
- Taco Mayo
- Taco Tico
- Taco Time
- Tastee-Freeze
- TGI Fridays
- Togo's
- Top Pot Doughnuts
- Tropical Smoothie Cafe
- Tudor's Biscuit World
- Twin Peaks
- Umami Burger
- Valentino's
- Village Inn
- Voodoo Doughnut
- Waffle House
- Wahlburgers
- Wendy's
- Wetzel's Pretzels
- Whataburger
- Which Wich?
- White Castle
- Wienerschnitzel
- Winchell's Donuts
- Wingstop
- Wolfgang's Steakhouse
- Yoshinoya
- Yum-Yum Donuts
- Zaxby's
- Zip's Drive-in
- Zippy's

===== Puerto Rico =====
- Martin's BBQ
- El Meson Sandwiches
- Taco Maker

=== Oceania ===
==== Australia ====
- Boost Juice
- Chicken Treat
- Donut King
- Guzman y Gomez
- Hungry Jack's (Burger King)
- La Porchetta Pronto
- Michel's Patisserie
- Noodle Box
- Oporto
- Pancake Parlour
- Red Rooster
- Sumo Salad
- Zambrero

==== New Zealand ====
- BurgerFuel
- Cobb & Co.
- Georgie Pie
- Hell Pizza

==== Papua New Guinea ====
- Big Rooster

=== South America ===
==== Argentina ====
- California Burrito Co.
- Mostaza

==== Brazil ====
- Bob's
- Giraffas
- Habib's
- Koni Store
- Mini Kalzone
- Rei do Mate
- Spoleto

==== Chile ====
- Dominó
- Juan Maestro

==== Colombia ====
- Hamburguesas El Corral
- Pollos Frisby

==== Peru ====
- Bembos

==== Venezuela ====
- Churromania

== Parent companies ==
- CKE Restaurants owns Carl's Jr. / Green Burrito, and Hardee's / Red Burrito dual-branded chains.
- Dunkin' Brands (defunct 2020) owns Dunkin' Donuts and Baskin-Robbins.
- Focus Brands owns Auntie Anne's, Carvel, Cinnabon, Moe's Southwest Grill, and Schlotzsky's.
- Kahala Brands owns Great Steak.
- The Wendy's Company owns Wendy's and T.J. Cinnamons
- Yum! Brands (spun off from PepsiCo in 1997) owned KFC, Taco Bell, and Pizza Hut restaurants outside of China until selling Pizza Hut to LongRange Capital in 2026.
- Yum China owns KFC, Taco Bell, Pizza Hut, East Dawning and Little Sheep restaurants in China.

== See also ==
- List of the largest fast food restaurant chains
- List of chicken restaurants
- List of restaurant chains
- List of revolving restaurants
- Lists of restaurants
