= KLG =

KLG is used to refer to

- Kalskag Airport, Alaska, US, IATA code
- KLG spark plug, invented by Kenelm Lee Guinness
- KLG (restaurant chain) in Taiwan and other countries
