= Caffe Bene =

Coffeehouse chain based in South Korea

- Industry: Coffee shop
- Founded: May 2008; 18 years ago
- Headquarters: Seoul, South Korea
- Owner: Sun-Kwon Kim
- Website: caffebene.com

Caffe Bene is a coffeehouse chain based in Seoul, South Korea. It was founded in May 2008 by Sun-Kwon Kim. Caffe Bene is the largest coffeehouse chain in South Korea by number of stores. As of April 24, 2012, Caffe Bene has 760 outlets in South Korea. Caffe Bene made its international debut in New York City in February 2012 and opened the second international store in Beijing one month later. Caffe Bene now has 3 outlets in China and has signed with 7 countries to open further stores. As of the end of 2013, Caffe Bene's debt ratio was 665 percent and its operating profit ratio was 2 percent.

As of April 4, 2014, Caffe Bene is operating 945 stores in Korea, 86 in the United States, 283 in China, 1 store in Canada, 5 in Philippines, 5 in Indonesia, 21 in Saudi Arabia, 32 in Mongolia, 2 in Malaysia, and one each in Brunei, Cambodia, Singapore, Japan and Vietnam. The number of stores continues to grow.

In November 2014, Caffe Bene announced plans to open its first drive-through coffeehouse in Little Falls, New Jersey. It opened in December 2014.

== History ==
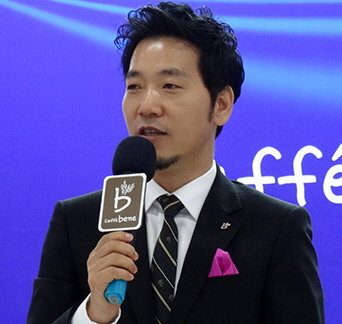
Sun-Kwon Kim, chairman and CEO of Caffe Bene

Sun-Kwon Kim, chairman and CEO of Caffe Bene, traveled to Canada and saw that the local coffee shops were very popular. He had confidence that he could create a brand that could compete with the cafes he saw. Caffe Bene is designed after European open-air cafes. The word "Bene" in the brand name comes from the Italian word for "good." This brand combines the European open-air atmosphere and traditional Korean culture of "Sarangbang".

=== New York City ===
Caffe Bene launched its first international store in New York City, on February 1, 2012. Located on 44th Street and 8th Avenue in Manhattan's Theater District, near Times Square, it is 600 square metres (6,500 ft^{2}), one of the biggest coffee shops in the area. Caffe Bene "specializes in coffee drinks and Belgian waffles, including savory varieties with bacon and Parmesan in the dough". The location's interior design was inspired by several city landmarks, including the Brooklyn Bridge and the New York City Subway. According to Caffe Bene, the company used recycled materials for its design.

=== Los Angeles ===
Caffe Bene branch opened in Los Angeles in the summer of 2012 on the ground floor of CGV mall with other famous South Korean cafe competitors such as Paris Baguette and Tom N Toms. It has a multimedia projector with K-pop music in addition to wooden tables and cement floors. In 2013, another Bene launched on Wilshire Boulevard and Berendo Street. Critics and visitors have claimed that the new Bene carries a cozier feel in addition to its high ceilings, similar with the previous Bene except revamped with improved design, structure, and atmosphere.

=== Boston ===
Caffe Bene branch opened in Boston in 2014. It lies on Huntington Avenue and St Botolph St and competes with shops in an area surrounding Northeastern University.

=== Suwanee, Georgia ===
Caffe Bene is located in Suwanee Georgia at 3131 Lawrenceville-Suwanee Road.

=== Other International locations ===
- The first stores in Cambodia and Taiwan opened in November 2013.
- The first store in Japan in December 2013. All Japanese stores were closed by 2018.
- The first store in Mongolia opened in December 2012.
- The first store in Indonesia opened in 2013
- The first store in Malaysia opened in March 2014.
- The first store in Vietnam opened in August 2014.
- The first store in Singapore opened in November 2015.
- The first store in Brunei opened in March 2017.
- The first store in Philippines opened in October 2012.
- The first store in Saudi Arabia

=== Products ===
Like other coffee chains, Caffe Bene sells brewed coffee, espresso drinks, hot and cold beverages, pastries, sandwiches, waffles, gelato, and features a rotating seasonal menu with accompanying seasonal fare.

In addition, Caffe Bene features misugaru, a traditional Korean drink, which "consists of black sesame seeds, black bean, black and brown rice and barley".
