= Water Grill =

- Interactive map of Water Grill

Restaurant information
- Owner: King's Seafood Company
- Food type: Seafood
- Reservations: Yes
- Website: watergrill.com

Water Grill is an upscale seafood restaurant in the United States. The original location is in Downtown Los Angeles. Additional locations are in Santa Monica, San Diego, Costa Mesa, Denver, Bellevue and Las Vegas. It is owned by King's Seafood Company.

== History ==
The original location is in Los Angeles. It is in the PacMutual Building. The architecture is Art Deco, including carved ceilings, brass doors, marble walls, and leather seats. Water Grill served "concept" seafood dishes. In 2011, the restaurant closed for one month. While closed, it underwent a $1.5 million renovation. Water Grill has been described as an "institution," in Los Angeles by the Los Angeles Times. Former chefs at the Los Angeles location include David LeFevre and Michael Cimarusti. In 2013, the Los Angeles location was named one of "38 Essential Los Angeles Restaurants," by Eater.

== Food ==
Water Grill serves seafood. The restaurants have raw bars serving fresh seafood. The restaurants serve ten types of oysters and also serve sea urchin and bay scallops. Specific dishes include fritto misto, shrimp and grits, ragout, and squid ink pasta with calamari. Water Grill's crab cakes were named the best in Los Angeles in 2011 by Los Angeles Magazine. Water Grill had earned one Michelin star in 2008 and 2009 however when Michelin updated their reviews in 2019, the restaurant received a reduced rating of a Michelin Plate.

== Gallery ==
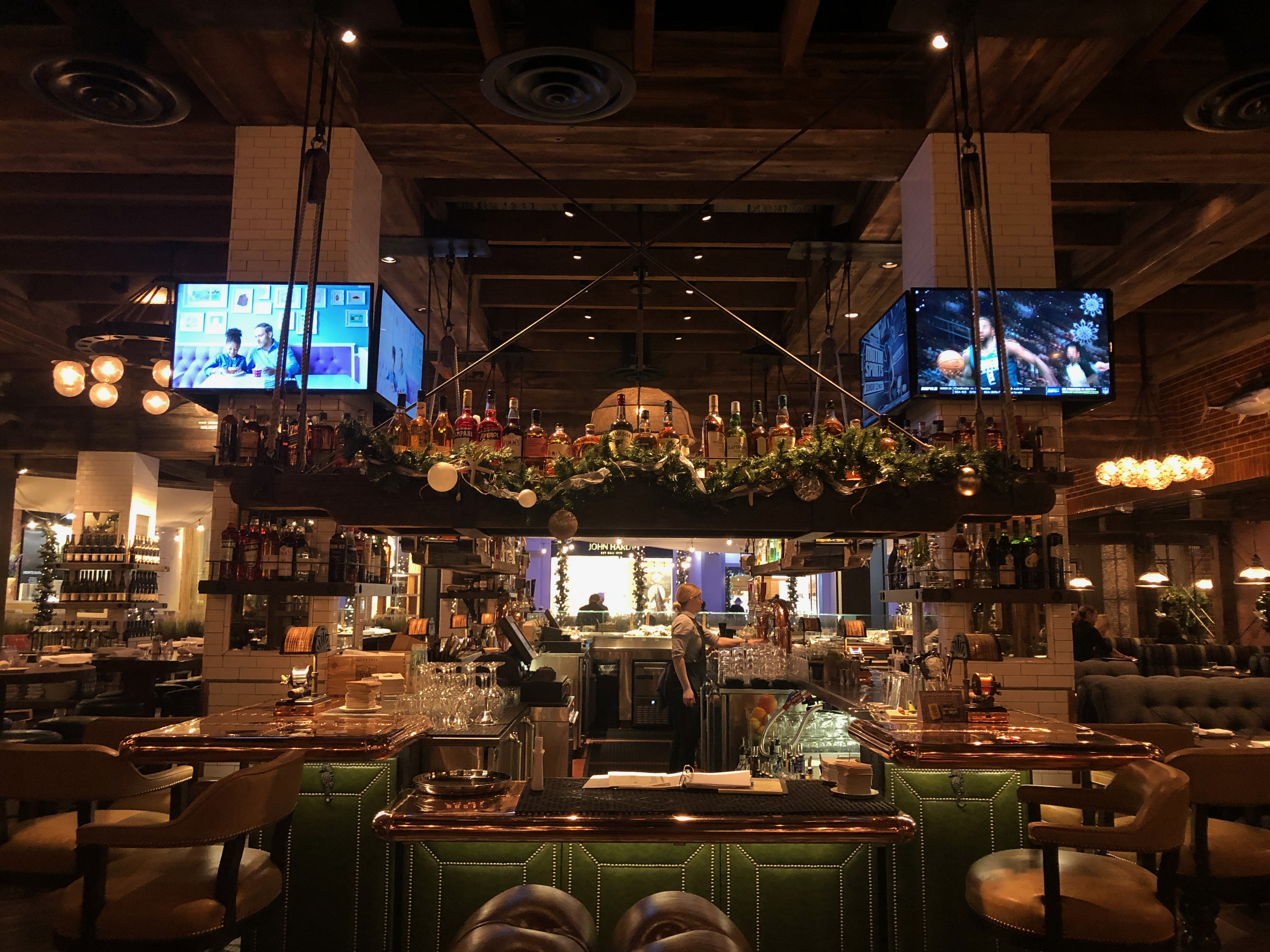
Bar at Water Grill, Las Vegas

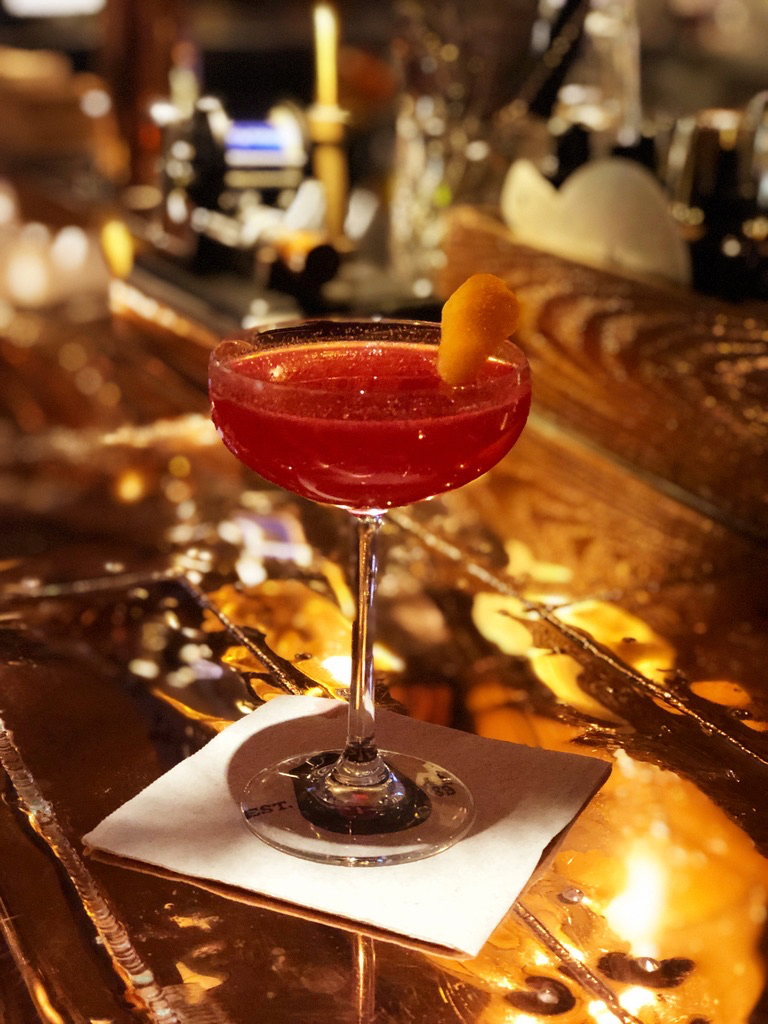
Seasonal cocktail at Water Grill, Las Vegas

== See also ==
- List of seafood restaurants
