= Atria (company) =

Finnish food industry company

Atria Plc
- Native name: Atria Oyj
- Company type: Public limited company (julkinen osakeyhtiö)
- Traded as: Nasdaq Helsinki: ATRAV
- Industry: Food industry
- Founded: 1903; 122 years ago in Kuopio, Finland
- Headquarters: Kuopio, Finland
- Areas served: Finland, Sweden, Estonia, Denmark
- Products: Meat products
- Brands: Atria; Sibylla; Lönneberga; Lithells; Ridderheims; Arboga Pastej; 3-Stjernet; Maks & Moorits; VK; Wõro
- Revenue: 1.6967 billion euros (2022)
- Number of employees: 3,698 (2022)
- Website: www.atria.com/en/

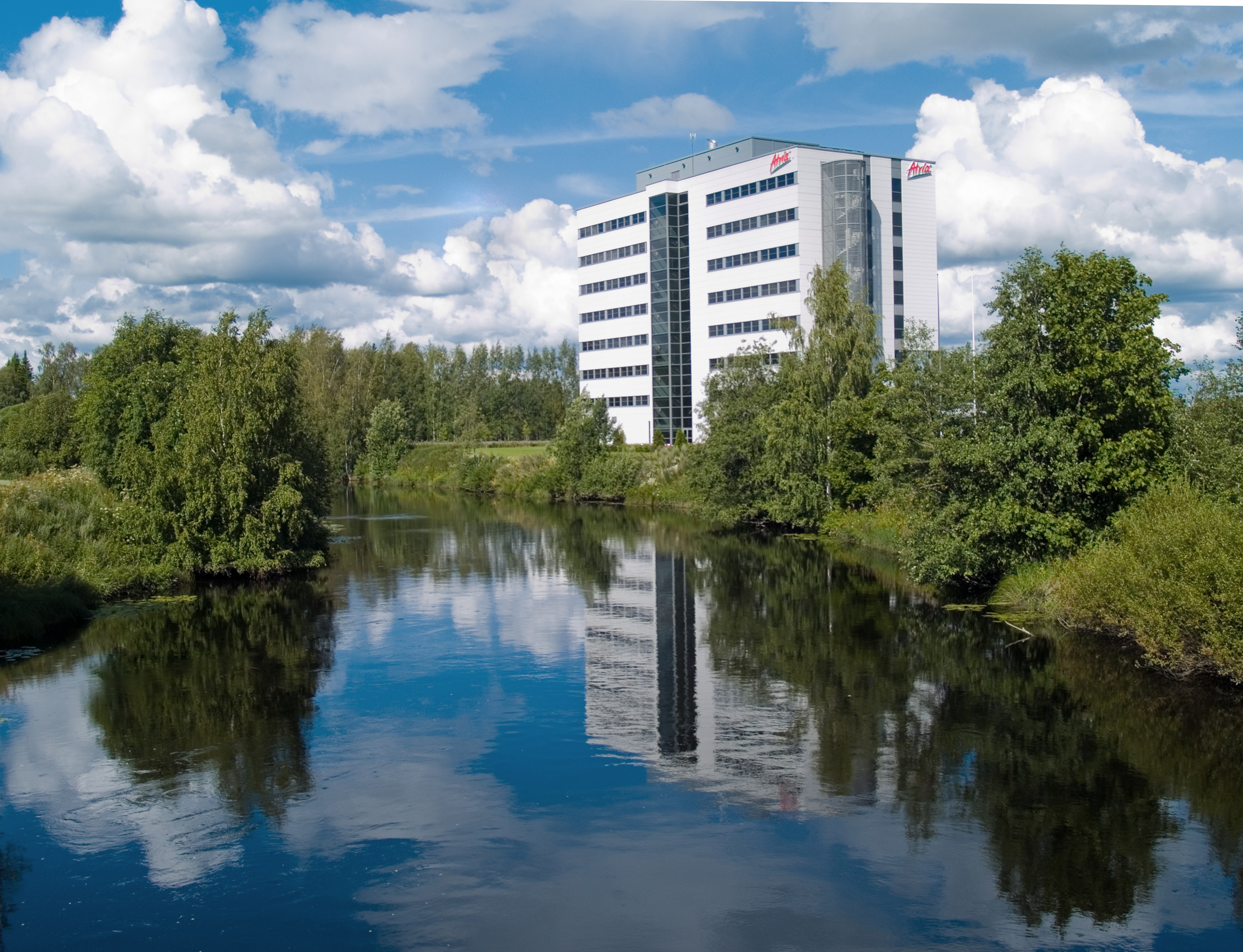
Atria's office building in Seinäjoki

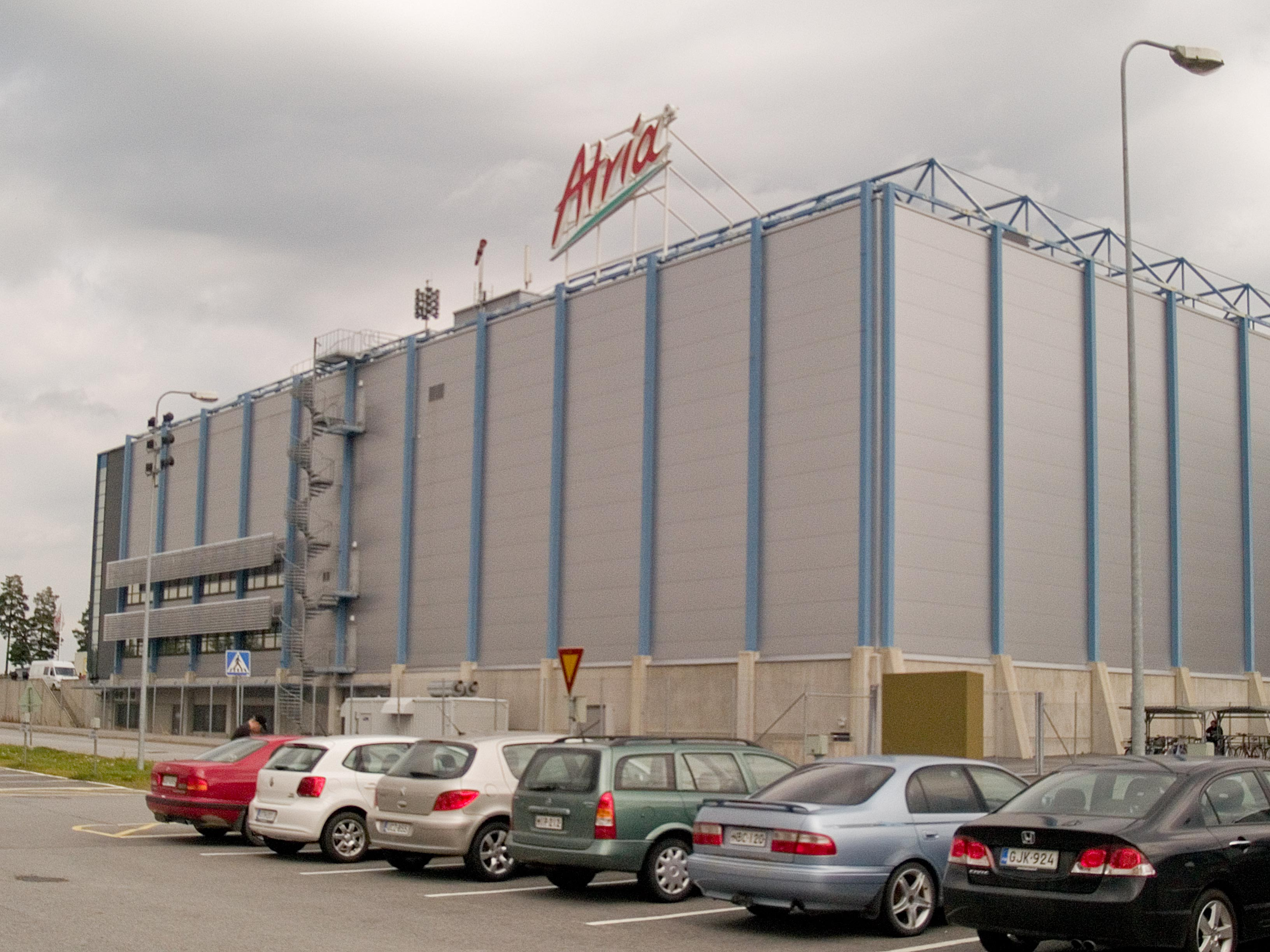
Nurmo's food factory is Atria's large slaughterhouse on the north side of Seinäjoki.

Atria Plc (natively Atria Oyj) is a Finnish food industry company. Atria's roots date from 1903, when a co-operative for livestock sales was founded. Atria is listed on the Helsinki stock exchange, NASDAQ OMX Helsinki.

Atria Group is divided into three business areas, which are Atria Finland, Atria Sweden and Atria Denmark & Estonia. Atria's customers are retailers, food service, the food industry, and its own fast food concept.

== History ==
The company is the result of the merger of Lihapolar Oy and Itikka Lihabotnia Oy in 1990.

History of Lihapolar Oy

- 1903 Kuopion Karjanmyyntiosuus kunta (Kuopio livestock sales cooperative, KKO) is founded.
- 1910 KKO buys a sausage factory, and the first Atria sausages are produced.
- 1938 Renamed to Savo-Karjalan Osuusteurastamo (Savo-Karelia Cooperative Slaughterhouse, SKO).
- 1956 Renamed Lihakunta (Meat cooperative). Business expands to include manufacturing and sales.
- 1972 Merger of Lihakunta and Karjapohjola. Operations expand to northern Finland.
- 1975 Lihakunta buys Pohjolan Liha Oy.
- 1981 Lihakunta acquires the meat division of Osuustukkukauppa (OTK).
- 1988 Lihapolar Oy is founded. It takes care of all production operations, sales and marketing.

History of Itikka Lihabotnia Oy

- 1914 Itikka founded in Seinäjoki.
- 1917 Itikka builds a sausage factory.
- 1937 First Atria ready meals produced.
- 1975 Itikka buys Maan Liha Oy.
- 1981 Itikka acquires a share of Osuustukkukauppa (OTK's) meat division.
- 1985 Itikka buys OK-Liha Oy.
- 1988 Itikka Liha-botnia Oy is founded, into which all manufacturing and commercial activities are transferred.

History of merged company

- 1990 Merger of Lihapolar Oy and Itikka Lihabotnia Oy.
- 1991 Itikka-Lihapolar begins operations. The company acquires Osuuskunta Pohjanmaan Liha (Ostrobothnia Cooperative Meat) and lists on the stock exchange.
- 1994 Atria is adopted as the company's name
- 1992–1996 Operations are consolidated in three offices.
- 1996 Nurmo ready-food production intensifies.
- 1999 Forssalainen Liha ja Säilyke Oy is acquired.

== Business areas ==
=== Atria Finland ===
Atria Finland's leading brand is Atria. Atria is the market leader in several product groups in Finland. By the company's own estimate, its total market share in grocery stores in about 27%.

=== Atria Sweden ===
Atria Sweden's leading brand is Sibylla, which is also Atria's most international brand. Other leading brands in Sweden are Lönneberga, Lithells, Ridderheims and Arboga Pastej.

=== Atria Denmark & Estonia ===
Atria Denmark's leading brand is 3-Stjernet. Atria Baltic's products are manufactured and marketed primarily in Estonia. The brands are Maks & Moorits, VK and Wõro. Atria's market share in cold cuts and sausages is nationally around 15%.

== Administration and management ==
Responsibility for the administration and operations of Atria Group lies with the governing bodies of the parent, Atria Plc. These are the General Meeting, Supervisory Board, Board of Directors and CEO.

=== Board of directors ===
- Seppo Paavola, Chairman
- Pasi Korhonen, Deputy Chairman
- Nella Ginman-Tjeder
- Mika Joukio
- Jukka Kaikkonen
- Leena Laitinen
- Kjell-Göran Paxal
- Ahti Ritola
