= SuperDeluxe (restaurant) =

Restaurant chain in Portland, Oregon, US

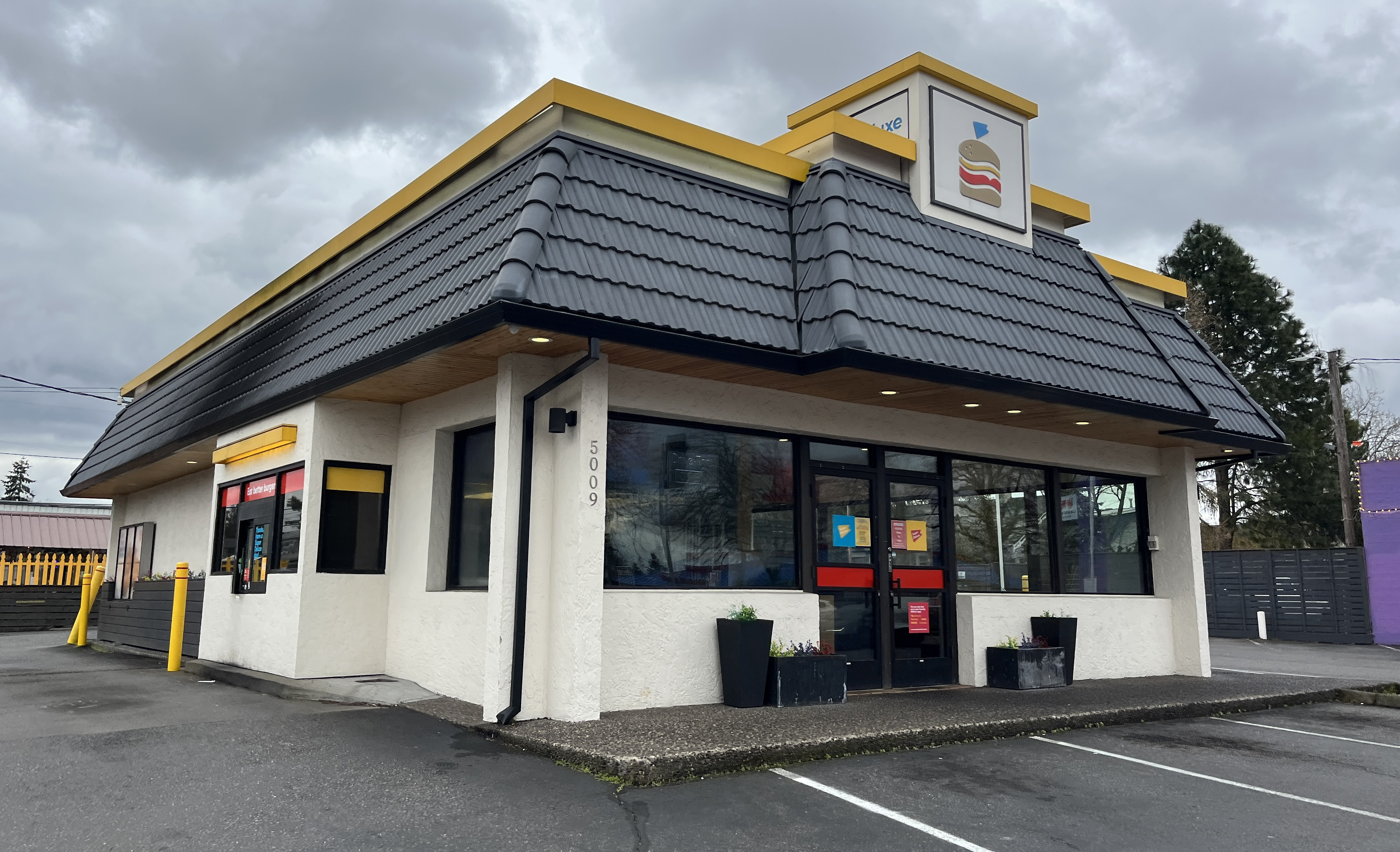
- Exterior of a SuperDeluxe restaurant in southeast Portland, Oregon, 2025
- Interactive map of SuperDeluxe

Restaurant information
- Established: July 2018
- Owners: Micah Camden; Matt Lynch
- Food type: American
- Location: Oregon, United States
- Coordinates: 45.49773°N 122.61104°W
- Website: eatsuperdeluxe.com

SuperDeluxe is a restaurant chain based in Portland, Oregon, United States. There are two restaurants in the Portland metropolitan area, including the original in southeast Portland and a second in Sherwood.

== Description ==
SuperDeluxe serves burgers, chicken nuggets, French fries, and milkshakes. Burgers are served with American cheese, onions, pickles, and shredded lettuce. The breakfast menu includes tot hash browns. The drink menu offers coffee (including almond milk lattes and mochas), using Stumptown Coffee Roasters. Milkshake flavors include blackberry, chocolate, coffee, strawberry, and vanilla.

Willamette Week's Andi Prewitt said of the original restaurant: "The building has been made over with bright, primary colors and a graphics motif that seems to pay homage to minimalist corporate designs from the '70s." The company's logo was designed by Portland-based graphic designer Aaron James Draplin.

== History ==
The original restaurant is located in southeast Portland's Richmond neighborhood, near the intersection of 50th Avenue, Foster Road, and Powell Boulevard. Co-owners Micah Camden and Matt Lynch opened the drive-through in July 2018, in a building which previously housed a TacoTime restaurant. A second restaurant opened in northwest Portland's Pearl District in 2019 with additional locations opening in Sherwood in 2020, Bend in 2022, and Lake Oswego in 2023.

In February 2024, SuperDeluxe declared Chapter 11 bankruptcy, citing heavy debt caused from the COVID-19 pandemic. All locations other than the original Portland location and the Sherwood location had closed by 2026.

== Reception ==
In 2018, David Landsel of Food & Wine wrote, "the vibe at SuperDeluxe feels more San Fernando Valley than Pacific Northwest, all hot asphalt and thumping bass and exhaust smells, except that the strip club facing the restaurant parking lot, overflowing with cars trying to get into the drive-through, sports a cheeky sign, advertising 'gluten-free lap dances.'" Bill Oakley called the burger "the best burger [he's] ever had in Portland". He named SuperDeluxe one of the best Portland-based fast food chains in his 2021 "guide to dining in Portland". Portland Monthly writers ranked the Double Deluxe number 12 on a 2020 list of "Portland’s 20 Best Cheeseburgers". Naomi Tomky included SuperDeluxe in Thrillist's 2021 list of fifteen "Pacific Northwest fast food chains the entire country needs".

== See also ==
- List of fast food restaurant chains
- List of restaurant chains in the United States
