= Duchess (restaurant) =

American fast-food restaurant chain

Duchess Worldwide, Inc.
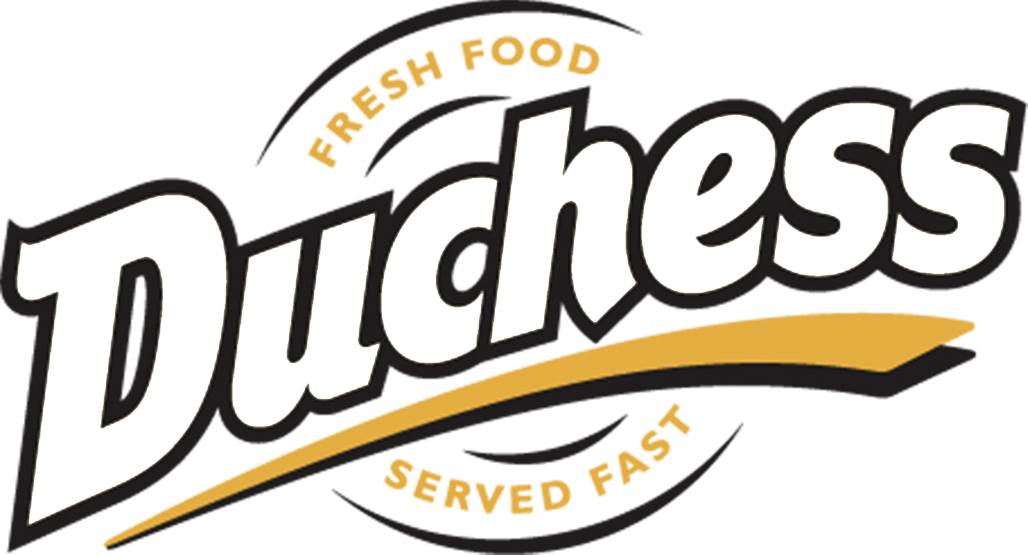
- Trade name: Duchess
- Type: Private
- Industry: Fast food restaurants
- Founded: 1956; 70 years ago in Bridgeport, Connecticut
- Founders: Harold Berkowitz; Jack Berkowitz
- Headquarters: Milford, Connecticut, United States
- Number of locations: 11
- Area served: Connecticut
- Key people: Michael Berkowitz (CEO); Gary Lavin (CFO); James Ferrell (COO)
- Products: Hamburgers, sandwiches, hot dogs, wraps, salads, chicken sandwiches, fish sandwiches, breakfast, soups, french fries, desserts, soft drinks, milkshakes, smoothies, coffee
- Revenue: ▲$5 million
- Website: duchessrestaurants.com

Duchess Worldwide, Inc., doing business as Duchess, is a privately owned and operated regional casual fast food restaurant chain that operates in southwestern Connecticut. Duchess was founded in 1956 by Harold and Jack Berkowitz in Bridgeport and based in Milford, Connecticut. There are 11 locations all in the Fairfield and New Haven counties of Connecticut. The restaurants feature an eat-in dining room, take-out service, and a drive-thru.

== History ==
In 1956, brothers and diner owners Jack and Harold Berkowitz bought a restaurant named Maraczi's that sold hotdogs and hamburgers in Bridgeport, Connecticut. The brothers needed to put a name on the paperwork and they decided to name the restaurant after Dutchess County, New York, without the "T". After the renaming, the Duchess fast food chain began to expand operations. As of 2026, Duchess now has 11 locations in the Fairfield and New Haven counties in Connecticut. Duchess has fresh produce, meat and poultry delivered daily.

== Locations ==
Duchess has 11 locations and are found only in Connecticut:

=== Fairfield County ===
- Bridgeport
- Fairfield (2)
- Monroe
- Norwalk
- Shelton
- Stratford

=== New Haven County ===
- Ansonia
- Milford
- Naugatuck
- Orange

=== Former Locations ===
- Branford
- Cromwell
- Danbury (2)
- Darien
- Guilford
- Hamden
- Newtown
- Ridgefield
- Stamford
- Wallingford
- Waterbury

== See also ==
- List of fast food restaurant chains
