= Hokka Hokka Tei =

Japanese take-out bento chain

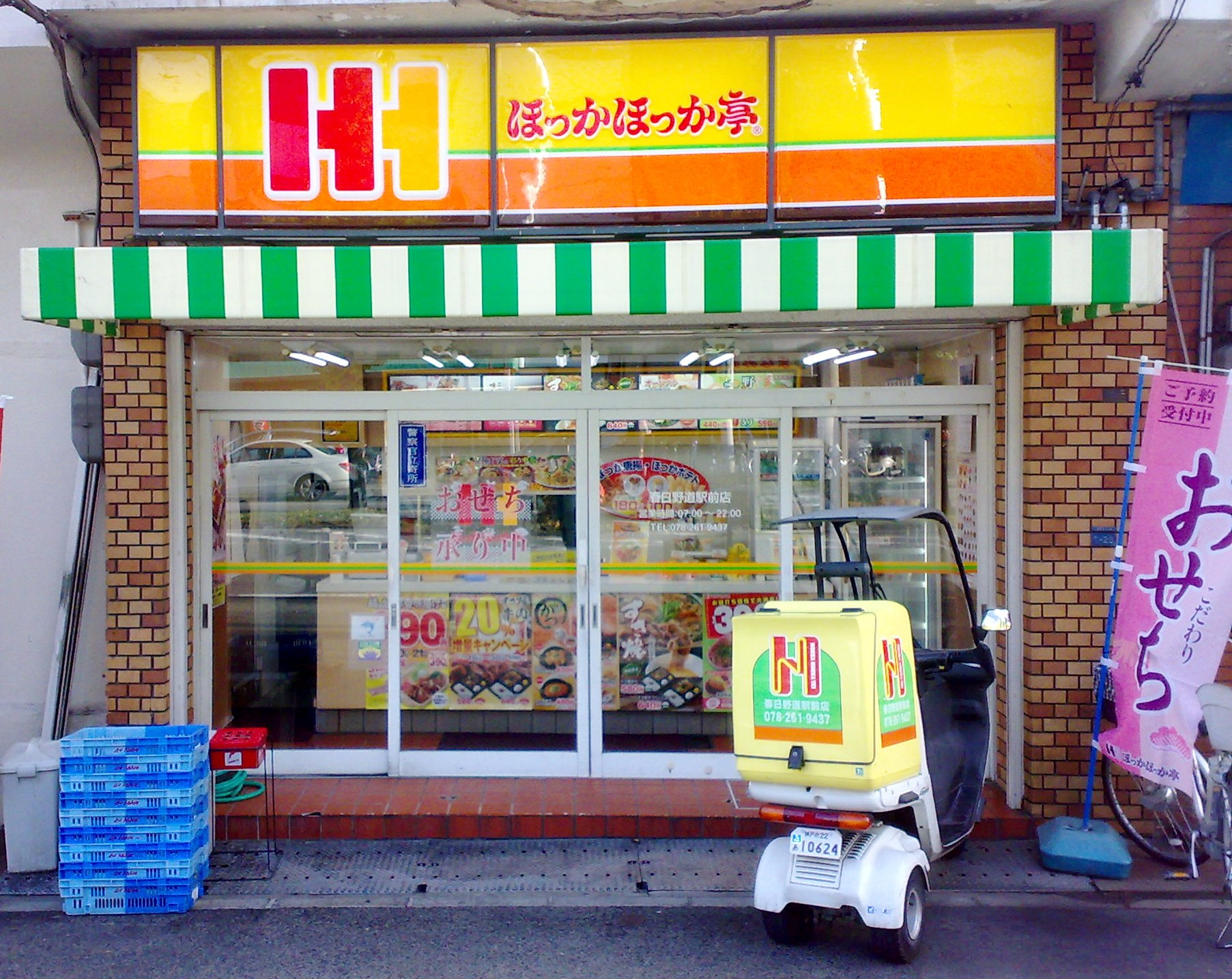
A typical Hokka Hokka Tei shop

Hokka Hokka Tei (ほっかほっか亭, lit. "Hot Hot Shop") is a bento take-out chain with over 2,000 franchises and company-owned branches throughout Japan. It offers a variety of dishes, generally over rice, at relatively low price. Unlike competitors such as Yoshinoya beef-bowl and the various cheap curry establishments, there are no chairs or counters for inside-dining.

Hokka Hokka Tei is the major brand name of Plenus Co., Ltd., which used to be engaged in office equipment sales before it changed industries to the food industry in 1980.

Plenus Co., Ltd., has left the franchise and established a new brand, Hotto Motto. HURXLEY Corporation, which was a franchisor in western Japan, continues to run Hokka Hokka Tei.

== See also ==
- Hotto Motto by Plenus Co., Ltd.
