= Crepe Runner =

Sri Lankan fast-food chain

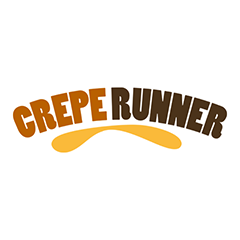
- Type: Privately held company
- Industry: Quick service restaurant - fast food
- Founded: 2019; 7 years ago in Colombo, Sri Lanka
- Headquarters: Colombo, Sri Lanka
- Number of locations: 34
- Area served: Sri Lanka; Maldives; India; Qatar
- Key people: Abdus Salaam (founder, CEO); Abdus Samad (co-founder); Mohamed Suhail (co-founder)
- Products: Sweet crepes, savory crepes, milkshakes, mojitos, Sri Lankan home-grown coffee, and loaded chips
- Number of employees: 180+
- Website: www.creperunner.lk

Crepe Runner is a Sri Lankan fast-food restaurant chain that specializes in crepes, both sweet and savoury.

== History ==
Crepe Runner was founded in Colombo in 2019 by Sri Lankan entrepreneurs Abdus Salaam, Abdus Samad, and Mohamed Suhail with support from friends and family. The chain currently operates 34 outlets in Sri Lanka, the Maldives, India, Qatar , with plans to expand into Indonesia, Pakistan, Bangladesh, South Africa, Australia, and Canada.

It started as a food truck, offering sweet and savory crepes in Colombo. Its success allowed the chain to expand its outlets, both locally and internationally, with the Malé branch opening on 7 October 2022.

== Products ==
The menu includes a variety of toppings and accompaniments such as in-house chocolate spread, loaded chips with spicy meat or melted cheese, and house beverages like milkshakes, mojitos, and hot chocolate. The outlets also serve Sri Lankan coffee to support local coffee-growing communities and their livelihoods.

== See also ==
- List of fast food restaurant chains
