= 555 East =

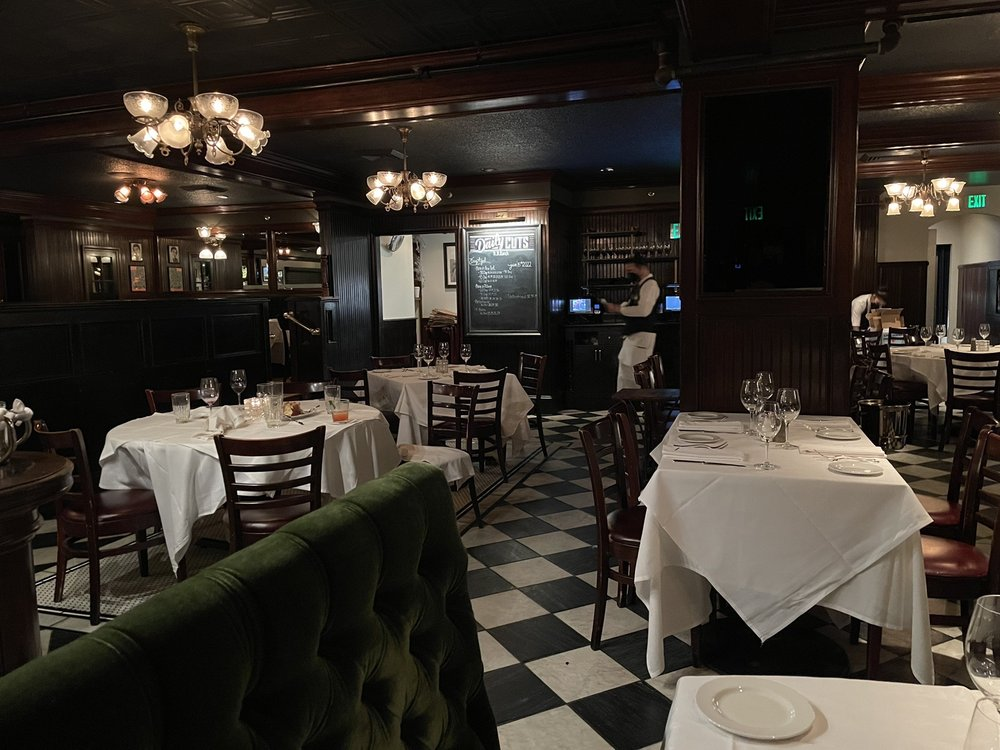
- 555 East steakhouse in Long Beach, California
- Interactive map of 555 East

Restaurant information
- Established: November 1984; 41 years ago
- Owner: King's Seafood Company
- Food type: Steakhouse
- Dress code: Casual wear, business casual
- Location: 555 East Ocean Boulevard, Long Beach, Los Angeles County, California, 90802, United States
- Coordinates: 33°46′02″N 118°11′10″W
- Reservations: Yes
- Website: 555east.com

555 East is an American steakhouse located in Long Beach, California. It opened in November 1984 and celebrated its 40th anniversary in November 2024.

555 East is part of the King's Seafood Company chain of restaurants.

In 1993, the restaurant had a brief name change to Domenic's East Village.

== Reception ==
Long Beach Current, "Voted by Long Beach State students as the “Best Place to Blow Your Whole Paycheck,” the award-winning steakhouse prides themselves on cooking customers’ steaks to perfection."

LAist, "If you want to be treated like Frank Sinatra would have been, this might be the restaurant for you."

Los Angeles Times (1995), "Steaks are no slouches either. All prime, corn-fed Midwestern beef, they’re served on platters that sizzle with butter without swimming in it. Kansas City strip is fabulous, charred a true medium rare, with a deep aged taste that gets better near the bone. The meaty T-bone is my next choice."

Los Angeles Times (1997), "With its dark wood wainscoting, burgundy leather booths and crisp white tablecloths, 555 East is a clubby haven for enjoying a martini or bourbon on the rocks, followed by a good steak and bottle of Cabernet.

Los Angeles Times (2024), "After 40 years, 555 East proves it still knows how to throw a party with its New Year’s Eve spread. Long Beach’s beloved steakhouse is offering a four-course prix-fixe menu."
