= Big Bite Submarines =

Norwegian fast food chain

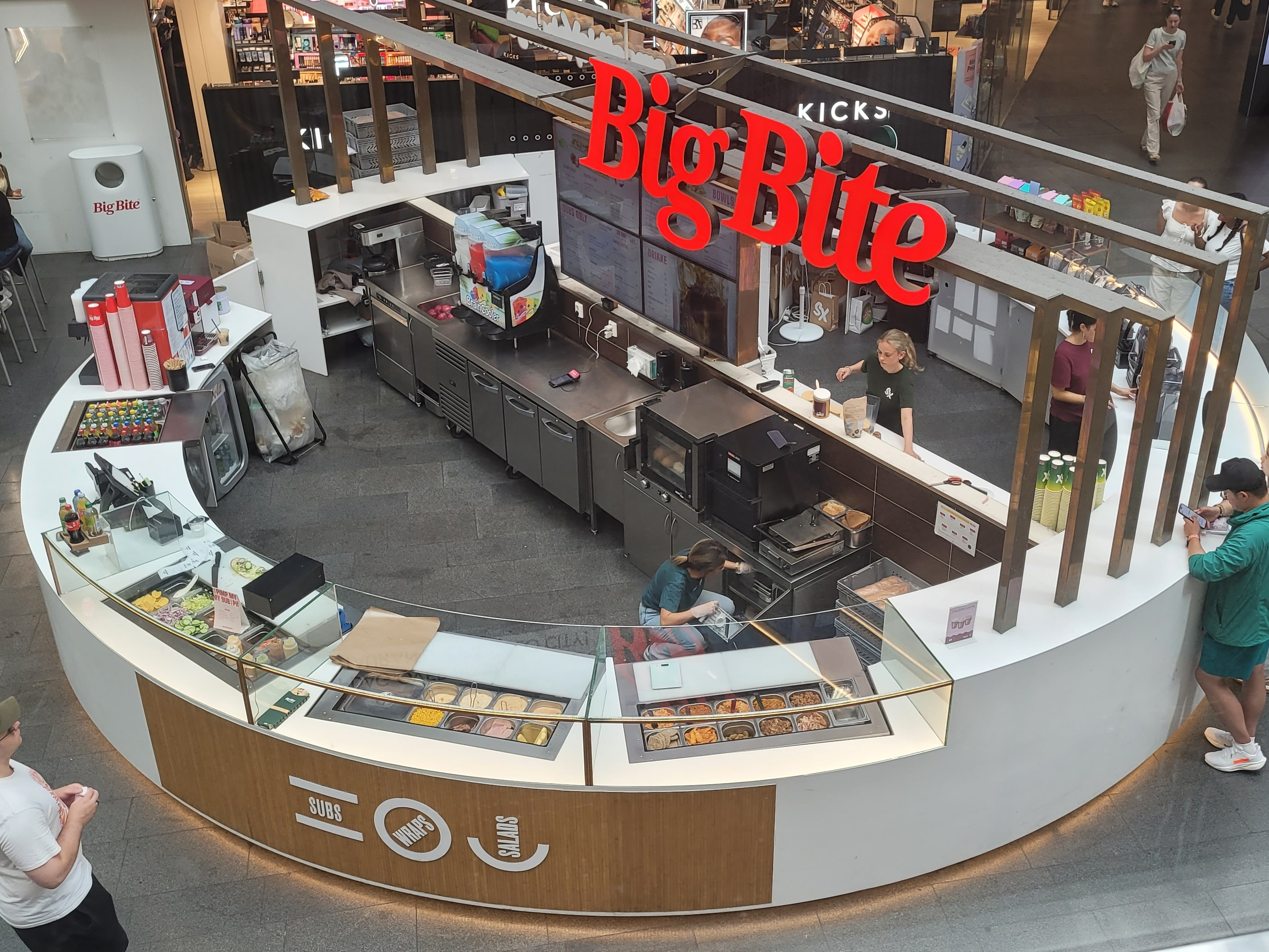
Big Bite in Oslo City Shopping Centre

Big Bite Submarines is a Norwegian fast food franchise focusing on fresh subs, wraps and salads. The first restaurant was opened in 1997 at City Syd in Trondheim. The stores are typically located in shopping malls.

As of July 2016, the chain operates 53 restaurants all over Norway.
