= Sushi King =

Malaysian sushi restaurant chain

- Sushi King's logo
- Company type: Subsidiary
- Industry: Food and hospitality
- Founded: 1995 in Kuala Lumpur, Malaysia
- Founder: Fumihiko Konishi
- Headquarters: Subang Jaya, Selangor, Malaysia
- Areas served: Malaysia, Indonesia
- Key people: Fumihiko Konishi, Elaine Chiew
- Products: Sushi
- Parent: Texchem Resources Bhd
- Website: sushi-king.com

Sushi King Sdn. Bhd. (formerly Sushi Kin Sdn. Bhd) is a Malaysian conveyor belt sushi restaurant chain that is a subsidiary of Malaysian multinational company Texchem Resources. It was established by Japanese entrepreneur Fumihiko Konishi in 1995. In March 2016, Sushi King received halal certification from the Department of Islamic Development Malaysia (Jakim). By August 2024, Sushi King had 130 restaurants in Malaysia and two in Jakarta, Indonesia.

== History ==
Sushi King was founded by Japanese pharmacist and entrepreneur Fumihiko Konishi in 1995 as a conveyer belt sushi restaurant at Yaohan department store in Kuala Lumpur. The restaurant became popular and subsequently expanded into a chain. In 2015, Japanese fast food restaurant chain Yoshinoya acquired a 28% stake in Sushi King. By 2016, Sushi King had about 100 stores in Malaysia with plans to reach 160 stores by 2020.

While Sushi King's customers were initially predominantly non-Muslim Malaysians including Malaysian Chinese, Konishi made efforts to appeal to Malay Muslim customers, who comprise the majority of Malaysia's population. To comply with Islamic halal standards, the chain ended the use of mirin rice wine and reduced the alcohol content of other ingredients; screening 150 ingredients to ensure that they were halal compliant. In March 2016, Sushi King received a halal certification from the Department of Islamic Development Malaysia (Jakim). By July 2017, the chain's Muslim customer base had risen from 22% to 40%.

On 19 March 2016, Sushi King opened its 100th store at the Aeon Mall Shah Alam. Sushi King's founder and Texchem Resources executive chairman Konishi also confirmed plans to open four new stores in Vietnam. In April 2017, Texchem established an Indonesian subsidiary called PT Sushi King Group Indonesia in order to expand its operations to Indonesia.

In July 2019, Sushi King's managing director Hiroki Mori confirmed plans to increase the number of stores in Malaysia from 135 to 200 over the next five years. Mori confirmed that the restaurant chain planned to collaborate with highway operation PLUS Expressways to establish new stores at rest and relaxation areas, petrol stations and airports.

During the COVID-19 pandemic, Sushi King's parent company Texchem Resources implemented various rationalisation initiatives including closing its Indonesian operations and reducing the number of its Malaysian stores from 150 to 121, which decreased the 2021 tax losses for Sushi King's restaurant division from RM15 million to RM1.3 million.

In January 2022, Yoshinoya Holdings sold its 28% share in Sushi King, citing the economic impact of the COVID-19 pandemic on the Malaysian economy. In February 2022, Texchem Resources dissolved its Vietnamese subsidiary Sushi King Co Ltd (SKCL), citing the economic impact of the COVID-19 pandemic and market uncertainty in Vietnam.

In April 2022, Texchem Resources confirmed plans to establish cheaper kiosk and satellite stores to take advantage of the post-COVID reopening of the Malaysian economy. The company allocated RM10 million to open several new stores including 20 kiosks in 2022. To reduce manpower requirements, Sushi King also introduced self-order kiosks and robotic trays in addition to new menu creations and intensified marketing activities. In December 2022, Sushi King Malaysia issued an apology after a Malaysian customer circulated a TikTok video of maggots in a Shoyu bottle at a Sushi King restaurant.

In April 2024, Texchem Resources appointed former Nando's Malaysia's head of marketing Elaine Chiew as Sushi King's general manager for marketing. In August 2024, Texchem Resources confirmed plans to re-establish its Indonesian operations, setting up two stores in Jakarta in November and December 2024. Konishi confirmed plans to establish 10 more Sushi King stores in Jakarta and other major cities, with the goal of establishing 150 new restaurants in Indonesia over the next five to ten years.
