= Zip's Drive-in =

American restaurant chain

Zip's Northwest, Inc.
- Type: Private
- Industry: Fast Food
- Founded: 1953; 73 years ago Kennewick, Washington, U.S.
- Headquarters: Spokane Valley, WA
- Number of locations: 39
- Area served: Inland Northwest
- Key people: Robert "Zip" Zuber (Founder)
- Website: www.zipsdrivein.com

Zip's Drive In (more commonly referred to as "Zip's"), is a restaurant chain located in the Inland Northwest region of the United States. Formerly a drive-in restaurant, expanding throughout the region in the 1960s and 1970s, the restaurant chain is one of few drive-ins that continued to expand through the early adoption of drive-through lanes and transitioning to a more fast food business model.

== History ==
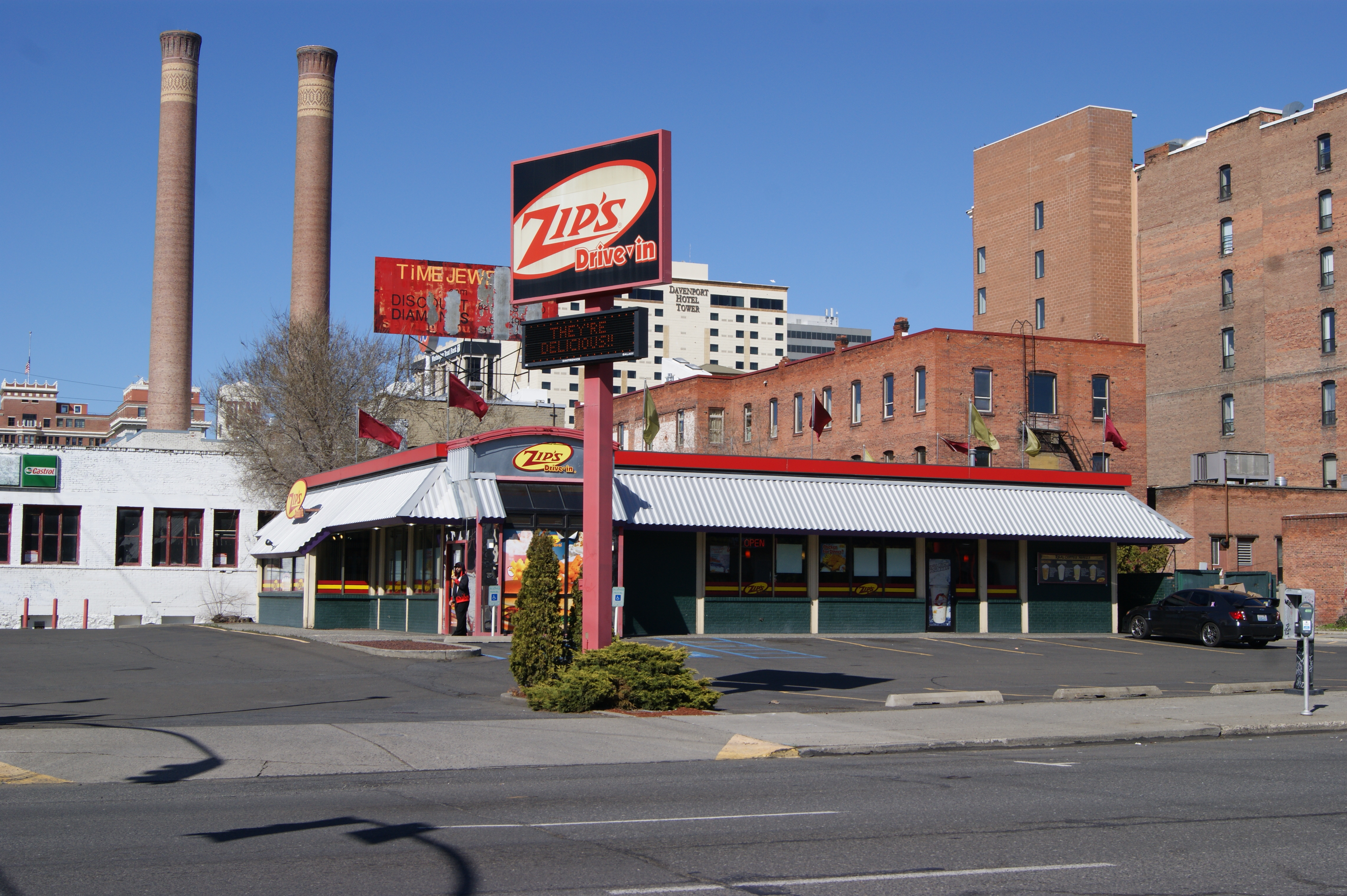
Zip's location in Spokane, WA

Zip's Drive In was founded in 1953 in Kennewick, Washington, by Robert "Zip" Zuber. Zip's was originally a drive-in created to serve scientists and workers coming to the Tri-Cities to work at Hanford and other nuclear industry companies, using the motto "Thrift and Swift". Zip's attracted so many customers, that Zuber decided to build another store, this time in Spokane, Washington near the Gonzaga College campus where it became quite popular among students. Zip Zuber eventually sold the business and after several transactions eventually came to be owned and operated primarily by Ed Minor, Don Kelly, and Harold Fettig who grew the business in the 1960's and 1970's.

In the 1960s, Zip's was a typical American drive-in restaurant, where the business model entailed customers driving up to a phone or table to place an order for a carhop to bring out, but by the 1970s many drive-ins across America were closing in the face of faster competition from fast food restaurants. Zip's began to decline, but Minor and Kelly built some of the first drive-thrus in the Northwest. Their quick thinking ended up saving the chain, and it is one of the few local restaurant chains still in operation today.

== Locations ==
Zip's Locations by county. Current locations are in red, while former locations are in pink

Zip's is located in 8 counties across Washington and Idaho, and was located in 11 counties at its peak. In 2017, Zip's had 40 locations, all in the Inland Northwest. The chain has been compared to In-N-Out Burger in southern California, due to its regionality and cult following. The chain started in the Tri-Cities, spread to Spokane, and then eventually spread to the Idaho Panhandle and the Palouse. Zip's is not a franchise and the menu can differ slightly depending on the owner and location; hours also vary, with some serving breakfast. A Boise, Idaho location was opened, but was shuttered during the recession.

=== Menu ===
Zip's is known locally for its wide use of tartar sauce on its menu items, for which the Inland Northwest is said to have a peculiar taste, as well as its shakes. The restaurant makes 30 gallons of fry sauce and 40 gallons of tartar sauce a week and has been sold to customers to take home.

== See also ==
- List of hamburger restaurants
