= Juan Maestro =

Chilean sandwich restaurant chain

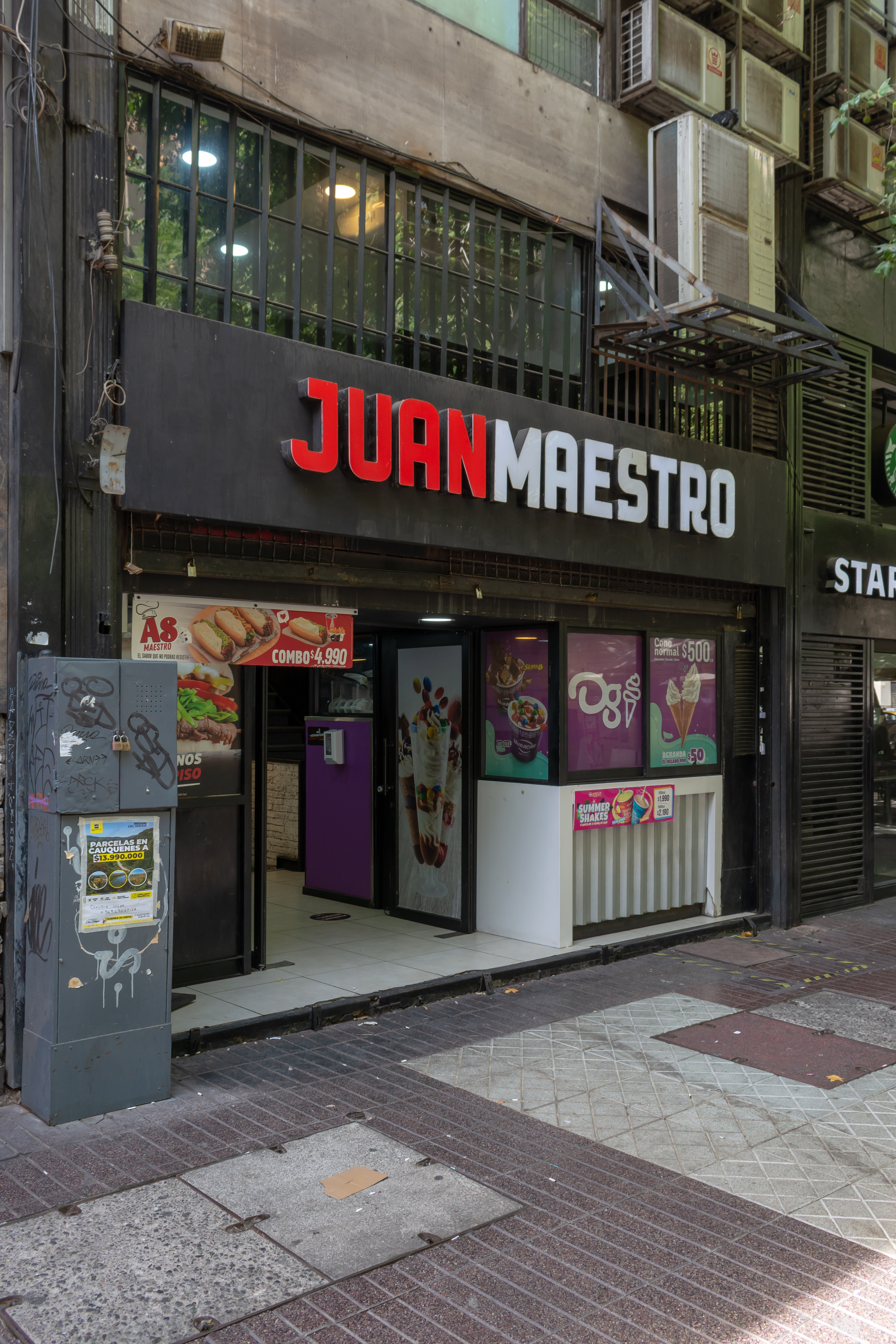
- A Juan Maestro restaurant in downtown Santiago.
- Company type: Subsidiary
- Industry: Restaurants
- Founded: 1983; 43 years ago Santiago, Chile
- Headquarters: Chile
- Number of locations: 81
- Products: Fast food (including sandwiches, completos, french fries)
- Parent: G&N Brands
- Website: juanmaestro.cl

Juan Maestro is a Chilean sandwich restaurant chain and subsidiary of G&N Brands. Its first branch opened in downtown Santiago in 1983. The company has since expanded and now has 81 locations across Chile.

Juan Maestro's parent company, G&N Brands Spa is the largest restaurant franchising holding company in Chile, with over 30 years operating in the country. It is led by Brazilian CEO Atila Noronha, who assumed the position in 2018.

The restaurant chain serves Chilean-style churrasco, chicken, and pork sandwiches. Customers can choose from various traditional combinations, such as chacarero, barros luco, campero or italiano. It also offers salads and sides, such as fries, empanadas, milkshakes, ice cream and refreshments, including soft drinks, juice and beer.

== History ==
In 1983, Juan Maestro opened its first location in the Commune of Santiago.

In 2016, American firm The Carlyle Group purchased 75% of Juan Maestro, in addition to Doggis, Fritz, Bob's, Mamut, Popeye's and Tommy Beans, being the other brands of G&N Brands. Combined their annual sales surpass US$150 million.

In 2018, Juan Maestro was voted by consumers as the best fast food brand. In the same year, its parent company opened nearly 40 new branches across all brands, with the majority being for Tommy Beans, Doggis and Juan Maestro.
