= Nacho King! =

Philippine food manufacturer and brand

Emyth, Inc. (Nacho King!)
- Company type: Closely held corporation
- Industry: Franchising / Food carts
- Founded: April 1995; 31 years ago in Pasig, Philippines
- Headquarters: 123 Pioneer St., Mandaluyong, Metro Manila, Philippines
- Key people: Teodoro K. Manotoc; President & CEO
- Website: nachoking.com

Nacho King! (corporate name Emyth, Inc.) is the largest Tex-Mex food manufacturer in the Philippines. It operates kiosk and food cart franchises in many marketplaces and malls in the major cities of the country, and is the largest and only nationwide Tex-Mex retailer in the Philippines; it also exports its products internationally, primarily to markets in Asia. The business was founded in 1995 and began selling franchises in 1996. Besides nachos, the company also sells other products including corn chips, tacos, tortillas, and tostadas, which are available for wholesale as well as retail distribution.

== History ==
In 1994, Mike Singh returned to the Philippines after going to college in the United States. He had experienced Mexican food in the US and realized that there was an opportunity to bring that experience to the Philippines. At the time, Filipinos tended to eat in malls and Mike and his friend Teddy Manotec realized that they could help bring the food cart industry to their country.

In April 1995, they opened their first outlet in SM North and quickly had lines out the door. By 1997, the two realized that they could not keep up with the immense demand for Nacho King! and decided to develop a franchise program, which became successful.

By 1998, Nacho King's! suppliers couldn't keep up with the large amount of demand for the products, so Nacho King had to redesign their supply chain. Mike and Teddy decided to go to the United States so that they could instill their own tortilla chip manufacturing line. After doing research they bought their first property and plant. They decided to make their tortilla chips from scratch, while importing the rest of their ingredients from the U.S. Due to their new increased supply, they had excess product, and they decided to wholesale sell their products to bars and restaurants, therefore becoming more diversified.

By 2000, Nacho King's corporation Emtyh decided to diversify into other industries. These industries included magazine publishing, internet auctions, and juice production. In 2001, Nacho King! had mobile carts to sell its food, and it continues to be one of the biggest food cart businesses in the Philippines.

== Franchising ==
Nacho King! allows prospective entrepreneurs to run their own franchise of the company. The potential franchisee will then be sent a starter package after their franchise site has been evaluated, and a feasibility study has been conducted .

=== Franchise Types ===
Currently, on the Nacho King! website the only available franchise type is a mall cart.

=== Franchise Cost ===
According to the Nacho King! website, the cost for a franchisee to set up a Nacho King! franchise is approximately PHP 580,000, along with the monthly cost of buying more supplies

== Products ==
Nacho King! offers a variety of products at their locations, and that are also available for wholesale. Products include chips, cheese, meat, salsa, and more.

== See also ==
- Jollibee
