= Cobb & Co. (restaurant) =

New Zealand Family Restaurant Chain

- Type: Limited
- Industry: Restaurants
- Founded: 1973; 53 years ago in Auckland, New Zealand
- Founder: New Zealand Breweries
- Headquarters: New Zealand
- Number of locations: 8
- Website: www.cobb.co.nz

Cobb & Co. is a New Zealand family restaurant chain.

It is New Zealand's oldest surviving family restaurant chain, having opened its first branch in 1973. Its name derives from the Cobb & Co stagecoach business originally founded in Australia in the 19th century by Freeman Cobb, although the chain has no direct historical connection with that company.

The chain's trademark feature is a stagecoach theme with red saloon-style doors. It offers a casual dining menu with steak, hamburgers, seafood, and similar items. It is known for its non-alcoholic mocktail drinks.

== History ==
The chain was created by the hotel division of New Zealand Breweries (now Lion). Their first Cobb & Co opened in 1973 in their Auckland South Pacific Hotel.

At its peak in the 1980s there were 37 Cobb & Co restaurants around New Zealand, but as of 2026 the chain had shrunk to eight branches: six in regional towns and centres in the North Island (Levin, New Plymouth, Porirua, Rotorua, Taupō, and Whakatāne), and two cities in the South Island (Christchurch and Dunedin).

In the 1980s it ran a series of comedic television commercials featuring British actor David Jason.

In 2012 the chain was purchased by Sue and Ben Gower, who had originally been franchisees of the Tauranga branch. In 2016, plans to re-expand the then-dwindling chain were announced.

Controversy arose in 2017 when a newly relaunched branch located in the historic Dunedin Railway Station applied for a licence to include slot machines on its premises, with the Problem Gambling Foundation criticising the presence of gambling machines in a family restaurant.

== See also ==
- List of restaurants in New Zealand
