= Tasty Treat =

Retail Fast-food brand in Bangladesh

- Type: Subsidiary
- Industry: Retail; Bakery; Fast food
- Founded: 2014; 12 years ago
- Founder: PRAN-RFL Group
- Headquarters: Dhaka, Bangladesh
- Number of locations: ▲500+ outlets (August 2025)
- Area served: Nationwide
- Products: Fast food, Cookies, Savory, Sweets, Cakes and pastries, Coffee and other drinks and beverages; Snacks, etc.
- Services: Restaurant; E-commerce; Teleservice
- Parent: PRAN-RFL Group
- Website: tastytreatbd.com

Tasty Treat (Bengali: টেস্টি ট্রিট) is a fast food and bakery chain owned by Banga Bakers Limited, a subsidiary of PRAN-RFL Group in Bangladesh. The company was founded in 2014 by the establishment of a food store in Mohammadpur. Tasty Treat has received a gold trophy in the food stall category of the 26th Dhaka International Trade Fair in 2022. In 2023, the brand received an A+ grade from the Bangladesh Food Safety Authority. Tasty Treat has over 500 outlets across Bangladesh, as of August 2025.

The motto of the chain is “Food You’ll Love To Share”.

== History ==
Tasty Treat was founded in 2014 with its first outlet in Mohammadpur. Ibrahim Khalil is the CEO of this brand.

Tasty Treat opened their outlet at Mirpur in 2015.

The Bangladesh Brand Forum (BBF) has recognized Tasty Treat for its contributions to digital platforms and for winning two awards at the first Retail Awards in 2021: Best Retailer – Restaurant and Best Retail Campaign.

In 2022, Tasty Treat started its journey in the Rajshahi city by establishing four outlets. It opened its outlet at the National Board of Revenue (NBR).In 2023, Tasty Treat launched many of their outlets in cities and districts of the country including Khulna, Jashore and Pabna.

In January 2024, it established an outlet at the Business Studies Faculty premises at Dhaka University which was inaugurated by Vice-Chancellor ASM Maksud Kamal. Tasty Treat, in April of the same year, developed a customized AI module called "Best Birthday Gift" with the purpose of finding people's birthdays without knowing their date of birth.

As of August 2025, Tasty Treat has over 500 outlets nationwide, with plans to expand its footprint by an additional 300 stores within two years.

== Products ==
Tasty Treats offers a variety of bakery products including cakes, cookies, biscuits; desserts and sweets; savoury foods, fast food, drinks and beverages as well as other snacks.
