= Rodilla =

Spanish fast food chain

- Formation: 1939
- Founder: Antonio Rodilla
- Founded at: Callao Square, Madrid
- Type: fast food chain

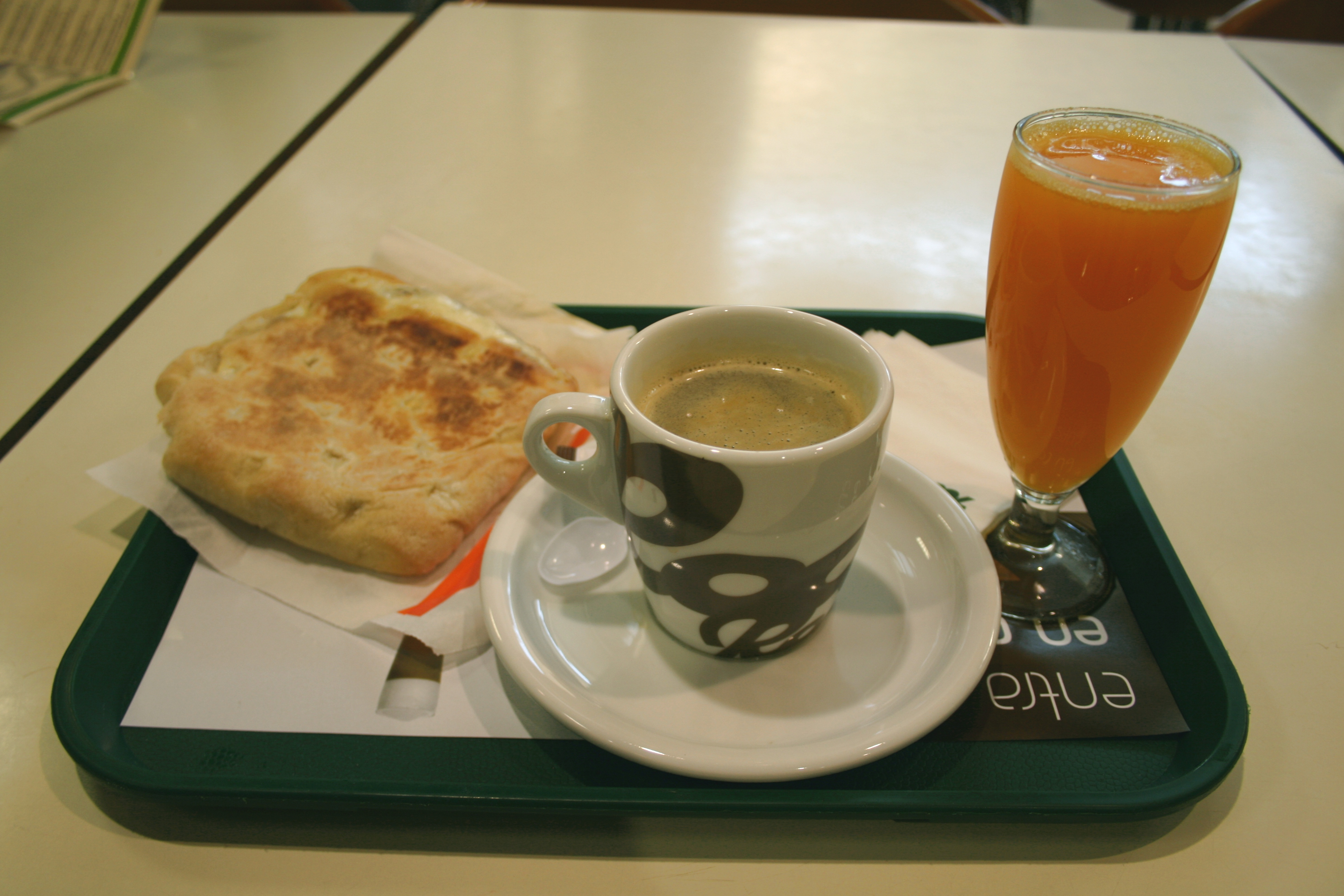
A typical breakfast at Rodilla.

Rodilla is a Spain-based fast food chain that specializes in cold and hot sandwiches, salads, pastries and fried dishes for dining in or take-out.

== History ==
About 1939 or 1940 Antonio Rodilla opened a confectionery shop in Callao Square in downtown Madrid. After some years he decided to sell a new line of products, cold meat (fiambre) sandwiches. Since it was difficult at the time to find a good bread supplier he decided to make his own sliced bread as well, called "English bread", or pan de molde (as opposed to the more traditional baguette-like bread).

In the early 1970s Rodilla opened two new establishments in Princesa and Orense streets, and in 1992 the new firm Artesanía de la Alimentación was created to centralize the production of their own raw materials.

== Expansion ==
Between 1993 and 1995 five new establishments were opened, and today it has a total of 72 restaurants; 63 in Madrid, 5 in Valencia, 2 in Barcelona, 2 in Sevilla, 1 in Toledo and 1 in Segovia. There is also at least one location in Malaga. In 1995, the company sold approximately 1.5 million sandwiches per month.

Already controlled by the brewery Damm since 2012, the Grupo Rodilla was fully bought by Damm in 2015.
