= Es Teler 77 =

Indonesian fast food chain

- Industry: Restaurants
- Founded: 1982
- Founder: Sukyatno Nugroho
- Headquarters: Indonesia
- Website: http://www.esteler77.com/

Es Teler 77 is a fast food chain established in Jakarta, Indonesia, in 1982. The name is a reference to a popular Indonesian dessert drink, es teler. It sells Indonesian foods, such as bakso, in addition to es teler.

The company has more than 200 outlets in Indonesia, plus several in Malaysia, Singapore and Australia.

== History ==
The company was founded by Sukyatno Nugroho, a Chinese Indonesian also known as Hoo Tjioe Kiat, who died, aged 59, of a stroke on a flight to Singapore. The company was the first franchise business in Indonesia. Sukaytno, a high school drop-out, opened his first es teler stall in 1982, and expanded to encompass more stalls, in 1992 making the decision to become a shopping mall-based fast food chain. Sukaytno became known within Indonesia as an entrepreneur, publishing his autobiography 18 Jurus Sakti Dewa Mabuk. Prinsip di Sini Senang, di Sana Senang (The principles of 'happy here, 'happy there', but also a reference to a well-known Indonesian children's song "di sini senang, di sana senang") was published posthumously in 2010 based on an unfinished manuscript.
