= Royal Castle (restaurant) =

Restaurant chain in Trinidad and Tobago

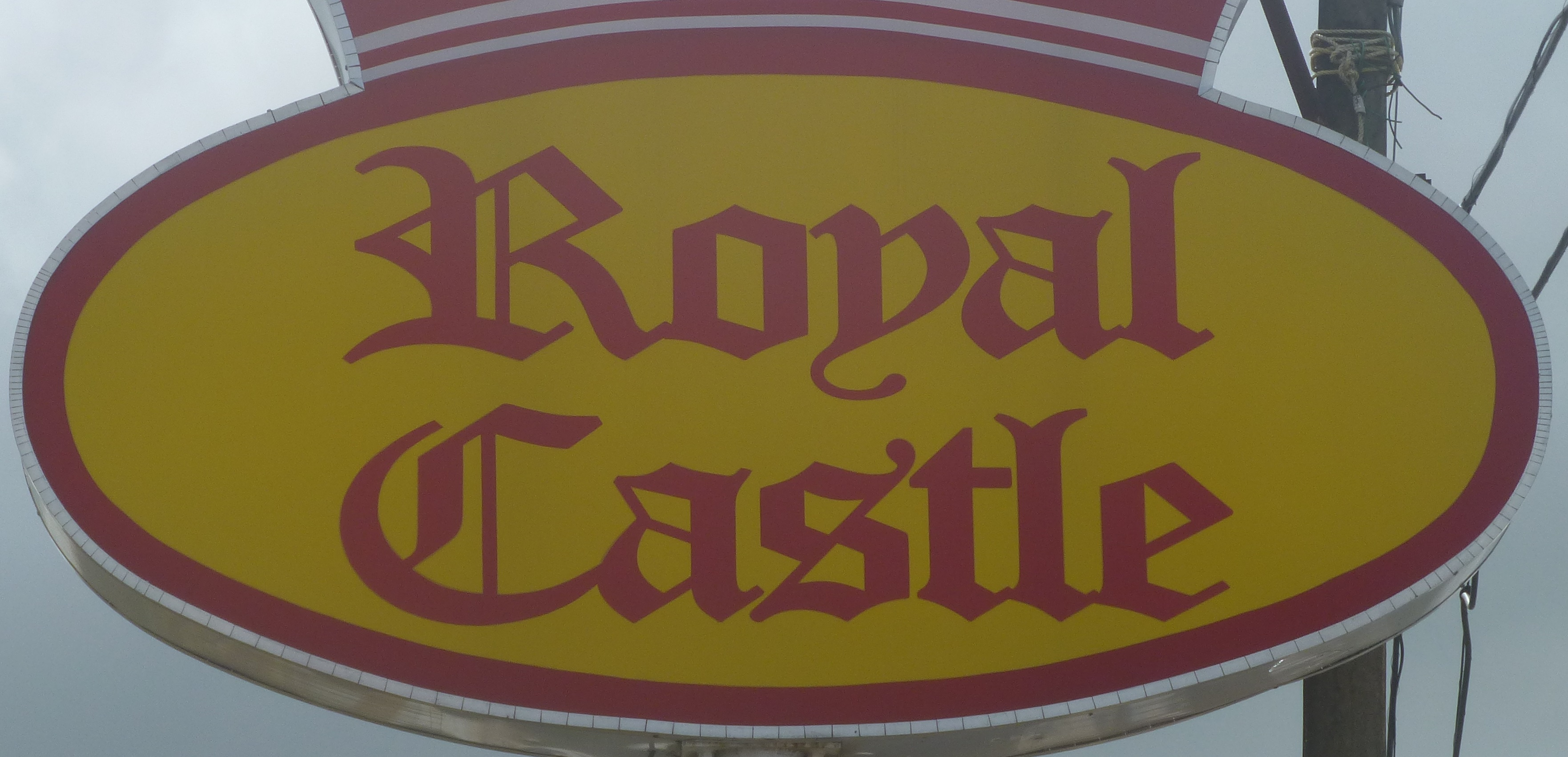
- Industry: Restaurant
- Genre: Fast food restaurant
- Founded: 1968; 58 years ago Port of Spain, Trinidad and Tobago
- Founder: Vernon Montrichard, Irene Montrichard, and Marie Permenter
- Headquarters: 1-5 Race Course Road, Arima, Trinidad and Tobago
- Number of locations: 37 (2018)
- Products: Fried chicken; French fries; Hamburgers
- Website: www.royalcastle-tt.com

Royal Castle is a fast food restaurant chain in Trinidad and Tobago.

Royal Castle was founded in 1968 by two Trinidadian couples, Irene and Vernon Montrichard and Marie and Ray Permenter in Port of Spain as the first fast food chain in Trinidad and Tobago. It grew to 37 locations with 520 employees over time. According to the website CaribbeanJobs.com, franchises began in 1987.

The restaurant was one of the first establishments to acknowledge the use of seasonings from Paramin in the preparation of its products, such as pepper sauce. During the year the restaurant offers fried chicken, rotisserie chicken or veggie burgers, fried fish with tartar sauce and fish sandwiches are also offered. The restaurant chain offers sides such as fries, coleslaw and potato salad. At various times there are specials where one can purchase combinations of products at "even more attractive prices" or participate in National Lottery Control Board (NLCB) approved promotions.

This restaurant has no relation to the Miami, Florida-based hamburger chain Royal Castle, launched in 1938 by William Singer.
