= Pepper Lunch =

Japanese restaurant chain

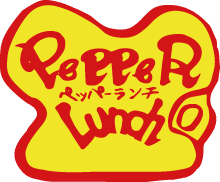

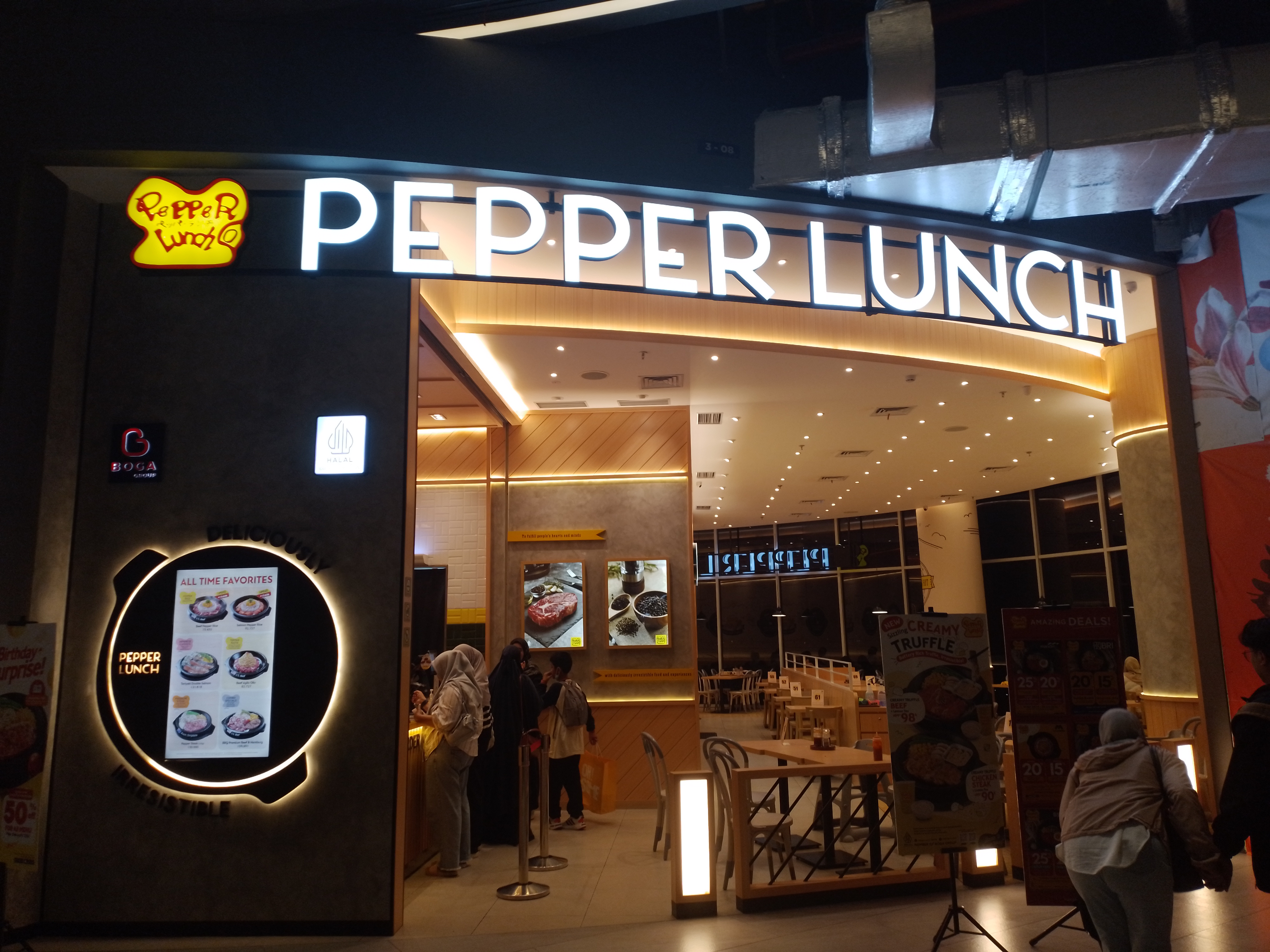
- Pepper Lunch outlet in Bogor Regency, Indonesia
- Native name: ペッパーランチ
- Type: Public
- Traded as: TYO: 3053
- Industry: Restaurants
- Founded: 1994; 32 years ago
- Founder: Kunio Ichinose
- Headquarters: Tokyo, Japan
- Number of locations: 577 (2026)
- Area served: Japan, Asia, Oceania, United States
- Key people: Kunio Ichinose (chef)
- Products: Steak, chicken, salmon, carbonated and other beverages
- Website: pepperlunch.com

Pepper Lunch (ペッパーランチ, Peppā-ranchi) is a Japanese "fast-steak" restaurant franchise popular in the Tokyo area. There are approximately 575 locations, as of 2026.

Pepper Lunch is a subsidiary of Pepper Food Service Co., Ltd. The restaurant's Southeast Asian operations are formerly managed by Suntory F&B International (in Asia) and Former Oishii Group in Australia and the U.S. Since April 2023, Asia, Australia and U.S. restaurants are managed by Hotpalette.

== History ==
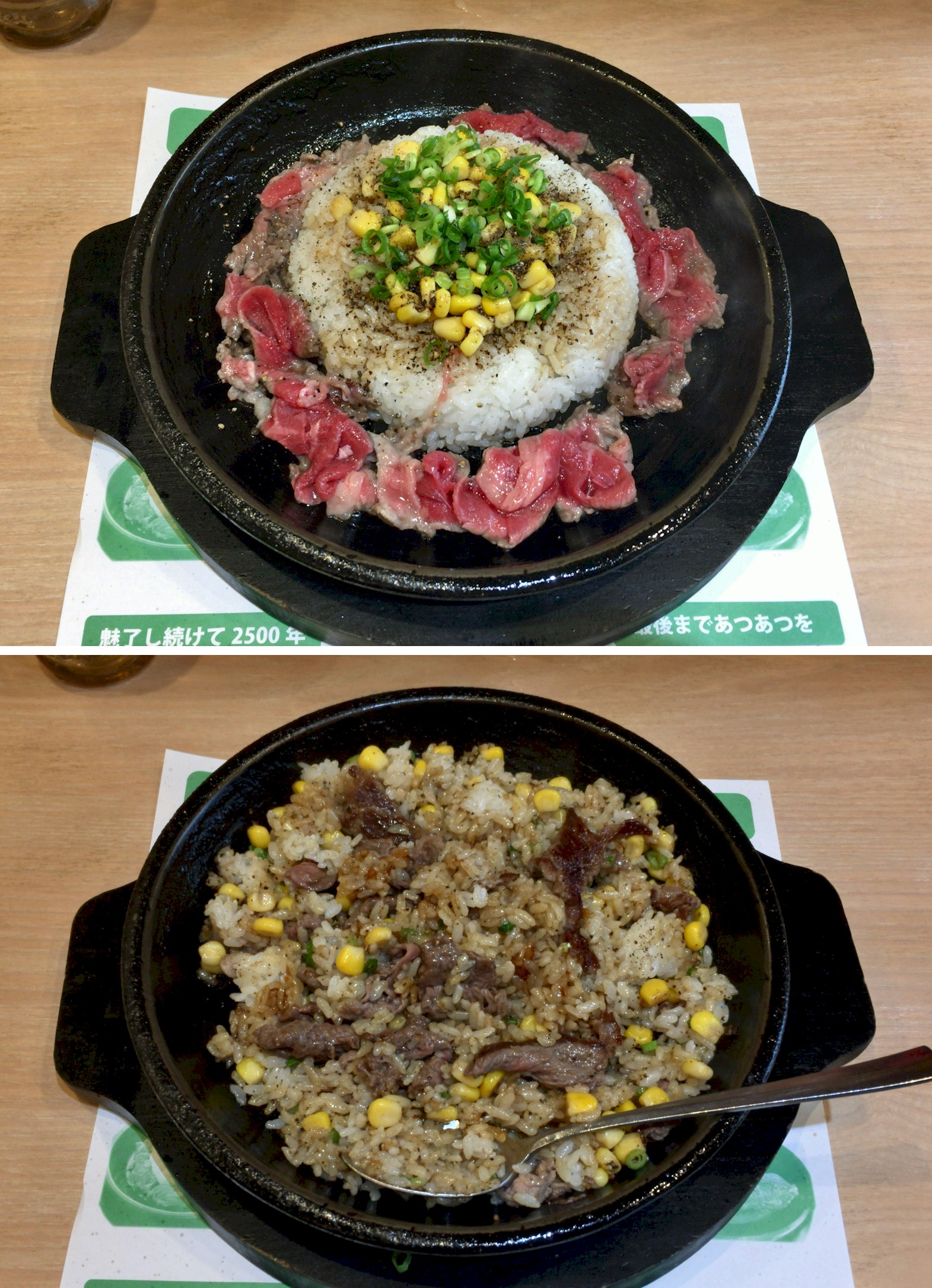
Beef Pepper Rice

Pepper Lunch was created in 1994 by chef and inventor Kunio Ichinose, who wanted to serve quality fast food without hiring a chef. He devised a method using hot metal plates that are heated to 500 °F (260 °C) by an electromagnetic cooker. The raw meat with vegetables and/or rice are then placed on the plates, where they cook in front of the customer. The meat can be eaten rare or well done, depending on the customer's preference. The meal is then mixed with a choice of either the special honey brown sauce (Amakuchi) or garlic soy sauce (Karakuchi).

In September 2009, all branches in Japan temporarily closed after 38 customers, aged 2 to 81, suffered from food poisoning. The cause was E. coli O157 poisoning, which spread throughout 19 stores among 14 prefectures in Japan. A supplier of diced beefsteak was ordered to recall the E. coli-affected product.

In 2025, Pepper Lunch broke a world record for "most photos of hot plate Pepper Rice uploaded to Facebook in one hour" for the inauguration of "World Pepper Rice Day," a celebration of Pepper Lunch's founding.
