= Mister York =

Fast food chain in Sweden

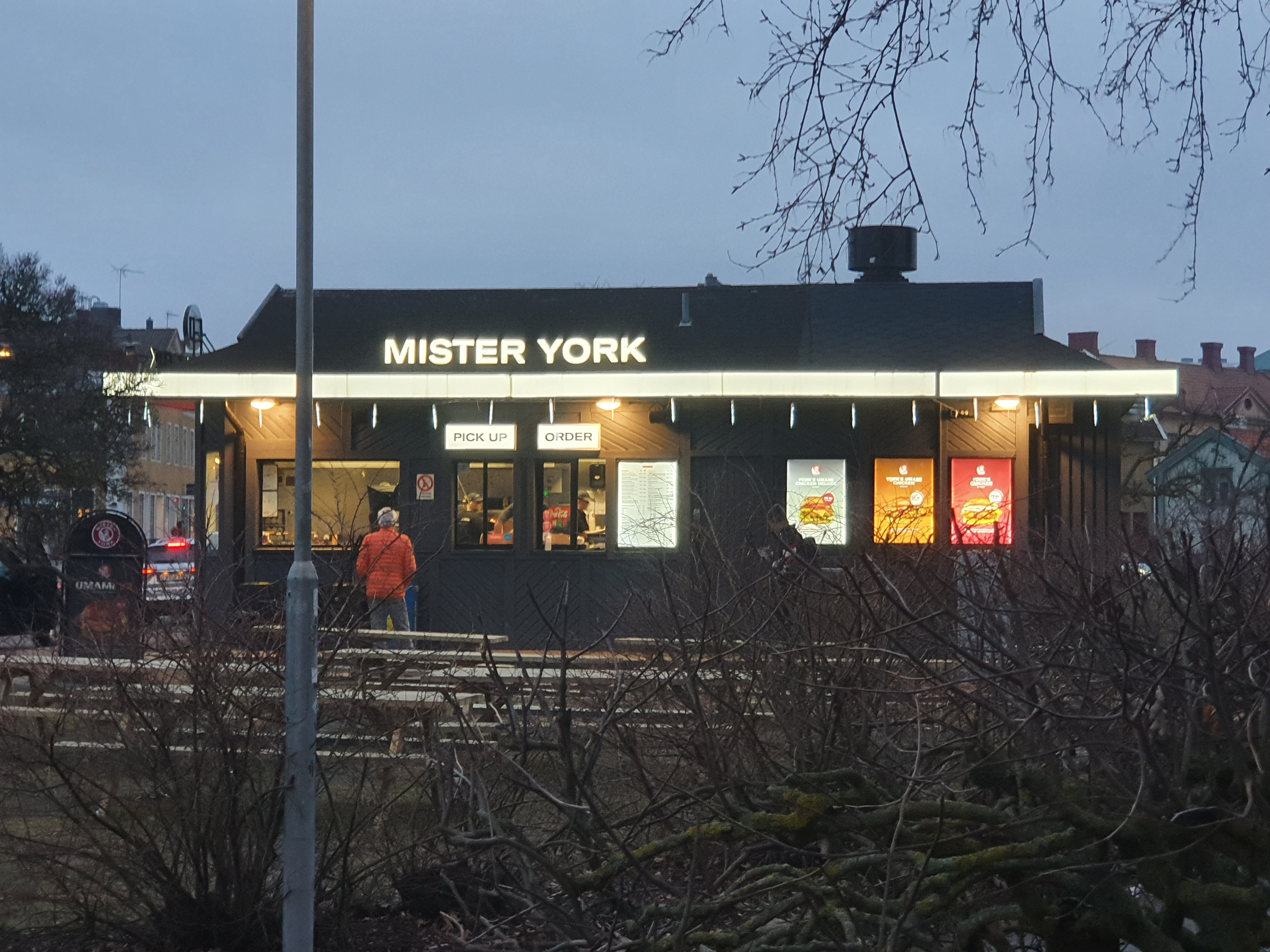
Mister York hamburger joint at Sveaplan, Kalmar

Mister York is a Swedish fast food chain which was founded in Kalmar, Sweden, during the pandemic 2020. It launched as a simple food truck, but quickly grew to a larger food chain, with restaurants around Sweden. Their niche is to provide premium burgers at fast-food prices.

During 2025, Mister York established 15 new locations around Sweden, with 8 more locations being unveiled at the start of 2026, among others, in Stockholm and Uppsala. As of April 2026, they have 45 locations across Sweden.

== History ==
Mister York was founded when two highschool students bought a used food truck and began selling premium smash-burgers. The concept has largely been based on small "container" restaurants with outdoor service, drive-thru and pick-up, often placed along busy roads or in retail areas.

== Reception ==
Mister York has received attention following food safety inspections carried out since 2024. More than 100 remarks have been recorded across the chain's restaurants, pointing to repeated issues with hygiene and food handling.

Among the reported problems were expired hamburger ingredients, old frying oil, and unclean kitchen equipment. These issues have raised concerns about food safety and quality standards at some locations.

The inspection results have also led to questions about whether the company's rapid expansion has made it more challenging to maintain consistent food safety practices across all of its restaurants.
