= Just Falafel =

Restaurant chain

JF Street Food
- Industry: Fast food
- Founded: 2007
- Headquarters: Dubai
- Key people: Mohamad Bitar (Managing Director)
- Website: www.justfalafel.com

JF Street Food is a chain of restaurants serving Mediterranean street food, founded in 2007 in Abu Dhabi, United Emirates. The first Just Falafel outlet opened in Abu Dhabi. Today, the chain has a total of 46 stores open in 11 countries.

JF Street Food serves menu items based on falafel, but also has a wide range of other authentic Mediterranean street foods such as shawarma, as well as a selection of mezze items like hummus, dips, salads and desserts.

JF Street Food has opened franchises in the US, Australia, Canada, UAE, Qatar, Bahrain, Kuwait, Turkey, Oman, Egypt, Saudi Arabia, United Kingdom and Belgium.
