= Barburrito =

British chain of Mexican style fast food restaurants

Barburrito Group Limited

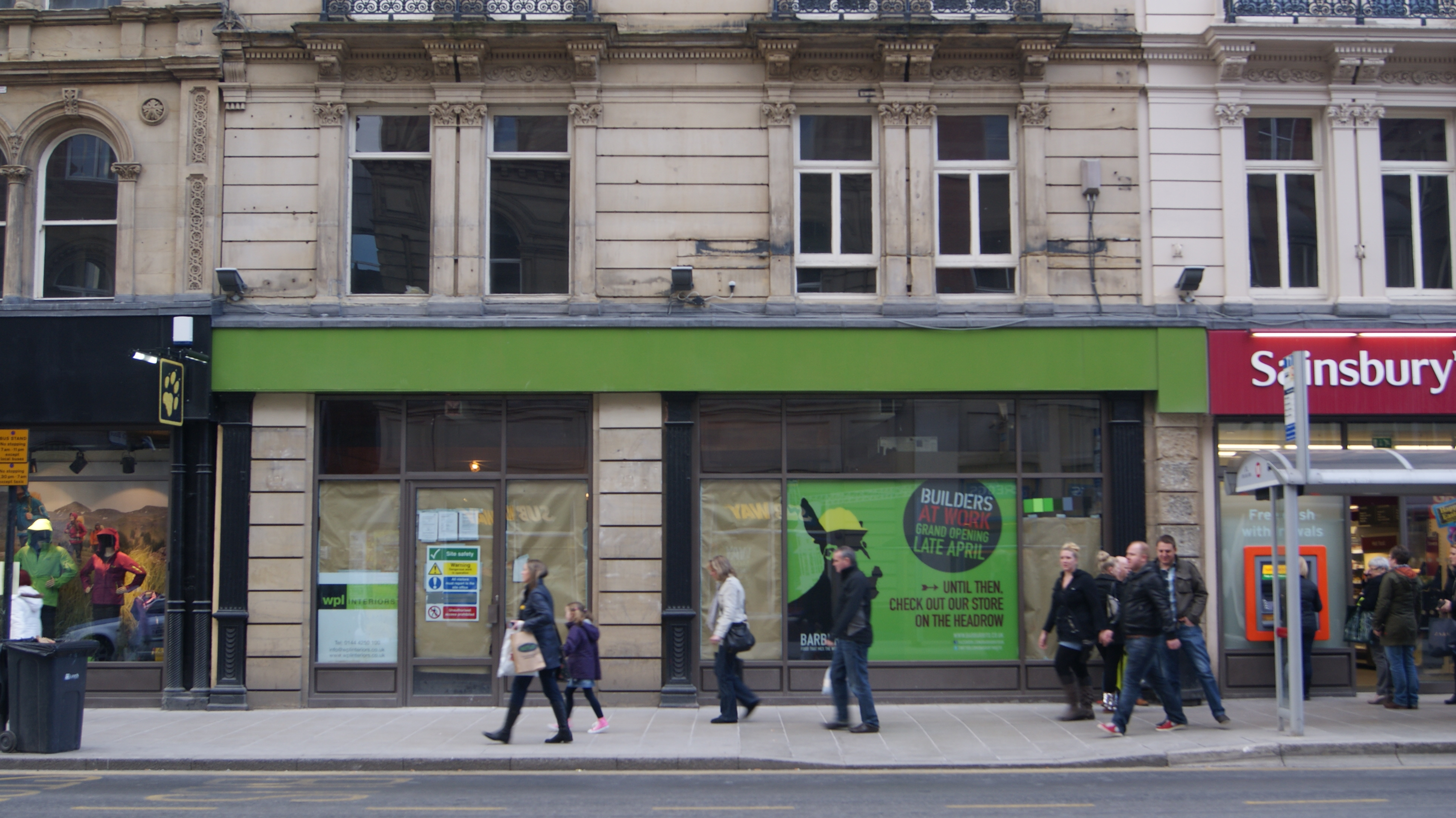
- Leeds' second branch opening of Boar Lane in 2013.
- Type: Privately held company
- Industry: Restaurants
- Genre: Fast food Tex-Mex
- Founded: 2005; 21 years ago in Manchester, England, UK
- Founder: Morgan Davies; Paul Kilpatrick
- Headquarters: Manchester, England, UK
- Area served: United Kingdom
- Products: Burritos, burrito bowls, nachos, churros, chicken wings
- Website: barburrito.co.uk

Barburrito Group Limited is a British fast casual restaurant chain, focusing primarily on Mexican cuisine including burritos, burrito bowls, and salads, based in Manchester, England. As of April 2026, the chain operates 11 stores across 7 towns and cities in the United Kingdom

== History ==
Barburrito was founded by Morgan Davies and Paul Kilpatrick in 2005, with its first store opening in Piccadilly Gardens in Manchester. In April 2010, the chain was operating stores in Deansgate in Manchester and Liverpool. In 2012, the company had sales of £5 million.

Barburrito received an investment of £3.25 million from the Business Growth Fund to expand to a number of different locations, including locations in London which would become the chain's first stores outside the North West. In June 2013, the chain opened two stores in London at Paddington Station and Cowcross Street.

== See also ==
- Barburrito, a Canadian QSR burrito chain founded in Toronto, Ontario in 2005 under separate management.
