= New York Pizza =

Dutch fast-food chain

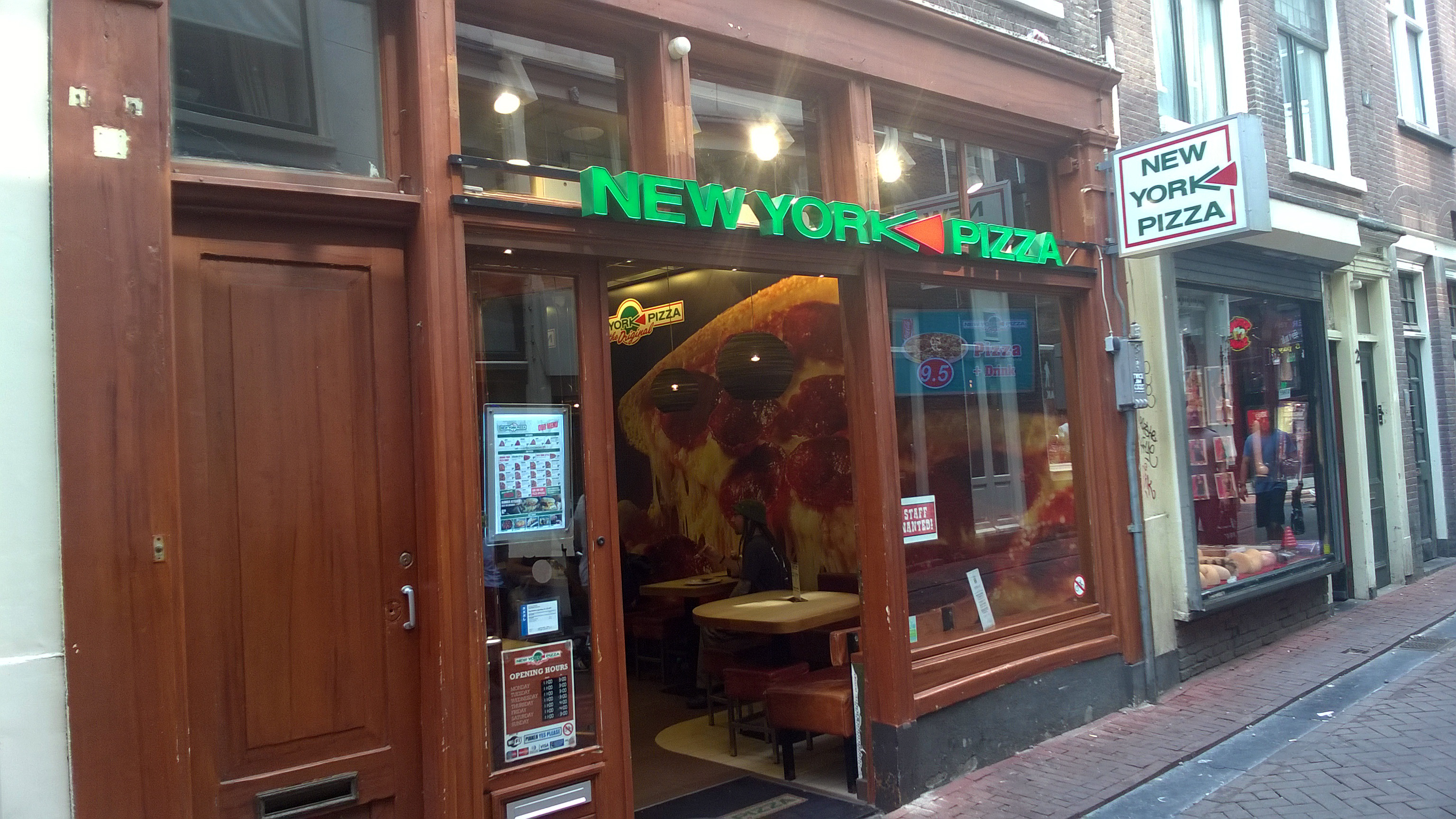
- A New York Pizza location in Amsterdam, 2018
- Company type: B.V.
- Industry: Restaurant
- Founded: 1993 in Amsterdam, the Netherlands
- Founder: Richard Abram, Max Vorst and Philippe Vorst
- Headquarters: Amstelveen
- Areas served: The Netherlands, Belgium and Germany
- Key people: Philippe Vorst
- Products: Pizza, pasta, fast-food
- Owner: Orkla
- Website: www.newyorkpizza.nl

New York Pizza is a Dutch fast-food chain specialising in pizzas. The individual outlets are operated by franchisees. In 2021, New York Pizza was acquired by the Norwegian company Orkla and transferred to Consumer & Financial Investments together with the Finnish company Kotipizza.

== History ==
Led by Richard Abram and brothers Max and Philippe Vorst, the company opened its doors in 1993 with a branch on the Spui in Amsterdam. The chain started delivering in 1996 and now has more than 200 delivery and takeaway locations. Besides pizza, the assortment also includes pasta, sandwiches and salads. In 2000, the Mama Joe Pizza and Pasta chain was taken over.

The formula is based on the franchise principle. New York Pizza has its own wholesaler and dough factory, called Euro Pizza Products, which also supplies dough to other chains in Europe.

== Distribution in Europe ==
In 2014, the first German branch was opened in Cologne. After only three years, operations were discontinued. In March 2018, a new attempt was launched again in Cologne. In 2020, a branch was also opened in Leuven, Belgium. After the takeover of New York Pizza by Orkla, a takeover battle began in Germany. In September, Stückwerk was taken over, and a month later, the Pizza Planet and Flying Pizza chains were also acquired. As a result, the number of branches in Germany rose from 4 to 107.
