= Mini Kalzone =

Brazilian restaurant chain

- Industry: Restaurant
- Founded: 1993; 33 years ago (Florianópolis, Brazil)
- Headquarters: Florianópolis, Brazil
- Products: calzones, smoothies
- Website: www.minikalzone.com.br

Mini Kalzone (Portuguese pronunciation: [ˈmĩɲi kɐwˈzõɲi]) is a Brazilian casual dining restaurant chain specialised in calzone.

The chain was founded in Florianópolis, Santa Catarina in 1993. The idea of selling pizza slices did not achieve the expected results and the entrepreneurs had to rethink the concept of business due to the presence of a close competitor that got wide success with the sale of pastries. A new alternative was planned with the idea of selling calzones. At first production was made in a small place on the mezzanine. On day one, they sold seven calzones. In subsequent months, the production was increased until the space was no longer enough, leading to its transfer to a restaurant in 1993.

In 1994, the trademark "Mini Kalzone" was created and the calzones came to be called as Mini Kalzones. Following the growth in the formation of a restaurant chain, until January 2000 were opened seven venues in the state of Santa Catarina. In June 2000, the company opens its first venue in Ceará state, with the construction of a production center and two shops in the city of Fortaleza. By the end of that year, three more venues were open, solidifying the initial strategy of occupation in that market.

From June 2001, the Mini Kalzone started the franchise format, standardizing products and operational techniques. Today the chain has more than 110 venues, located in different cities all over Brazil.
