= Sibylla (fast food) =

Swedish fast food restaurant chain

- Industry: Restaurant
- Founded: 1932
- Founder: Oskar Lithell
- Products: Hamburgers, French fries, meatballs, kebab
- Website: https://www.sibylla.se/

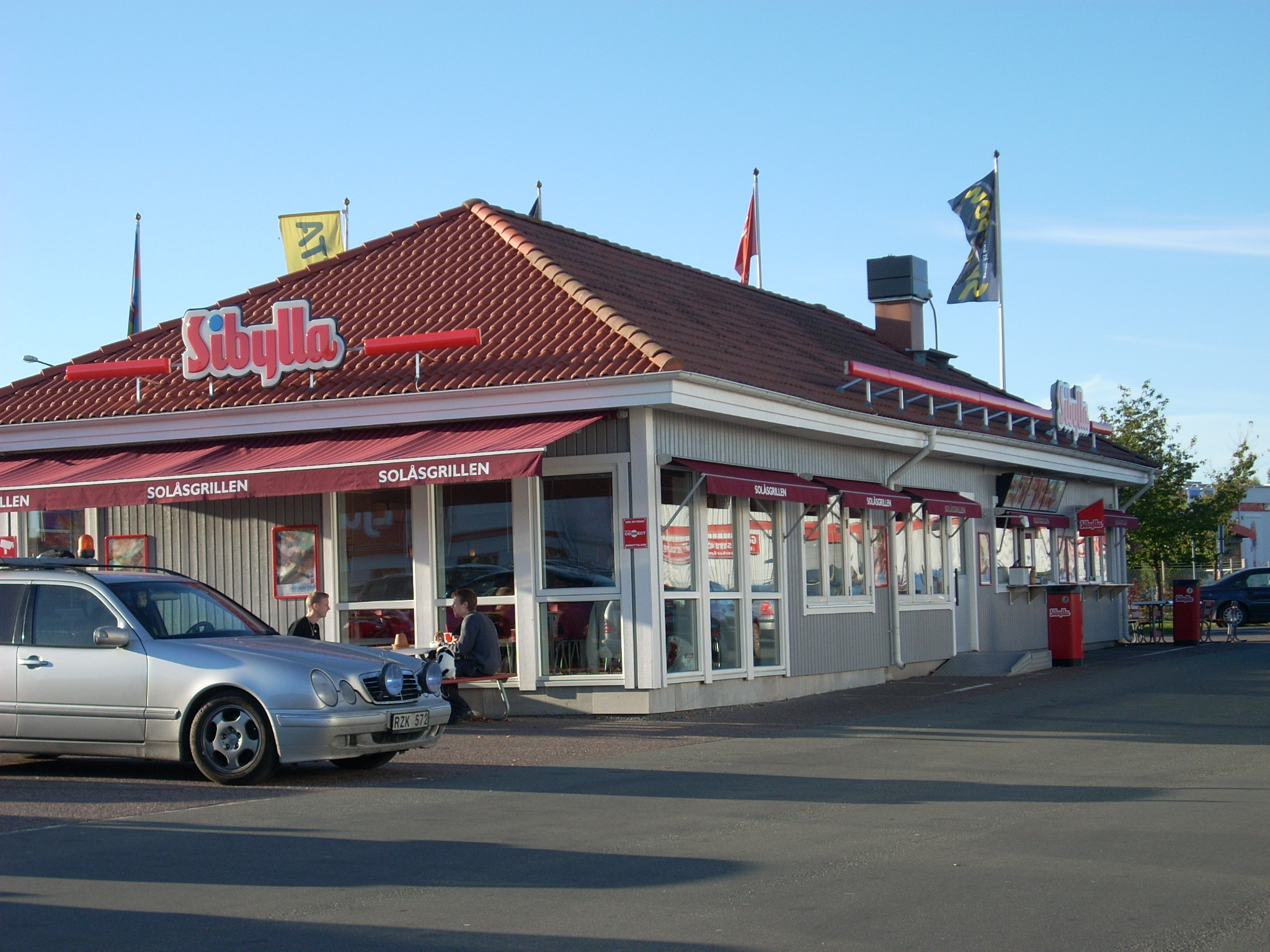
A Sibylla restaurant in Jönköping, Sweden

Sibylla is a chain of fast food restaurants located throughout Sweden and Finland. Sibylla is operated by Atria Sweden. In 1932, Oskar Lithell launched Sweden's first hot dog under the name Sibylla. Since then, menus with french fries, hamburgers, meatballs, chicken and kebabs have been developed.

== History ==
- 1907 — Oskar Lithell started his first factory in Kumla
- 1930 — Hot Dog production begins
- 1932 — Sybil sausage launched
- 1949 — Start of manufacturing grill sausages
- 1957 — Production moved to Sköllersta, just outside Örebro
- 1997 — Sibyl chain formed with over 170 franchisees / kitchens
- 2004 — Sibylla brand appointed as a Superbrand

== See also ==
- List of hamburger restaurants
