= Tom N Toms =

South Korean coffeehouse chain

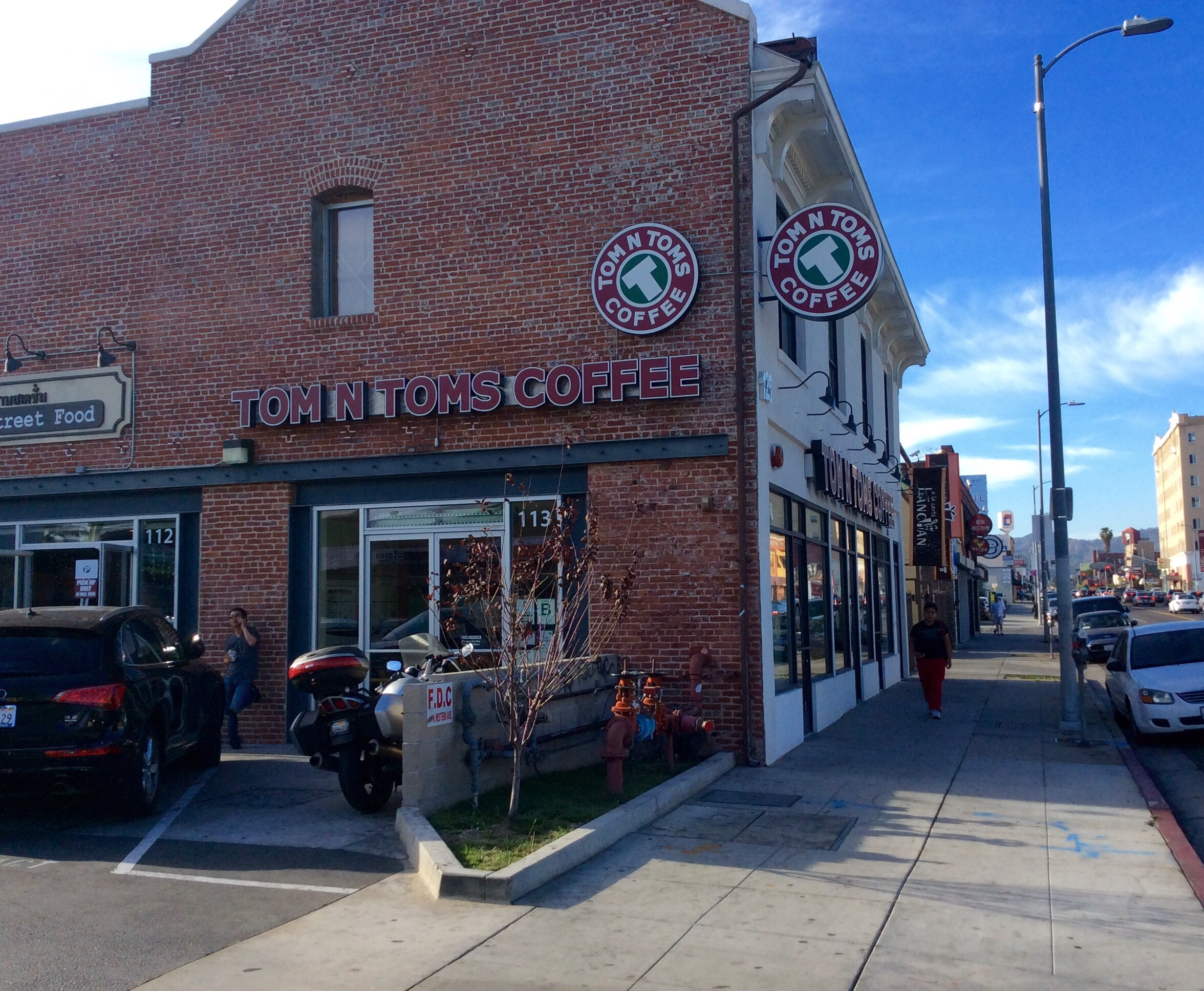
- Tom N Toms Coffee in Koreatown, Los Angeles
- Industry: Coffee shop
- Founded: South Korea (2001; 25 years ago)
- Headquarters: Seoul, South Korea
- Number of locations: 410+ stores (2014)
- Website: Official website

Tom N Toms Coffee (Korean: 탐앤탐스) is a coffeehouse chain based in South Korea. It first opened in the Apgujeong-dong District of Seoul and now has over 400 branches in 9 countries worldwide. It is also among the top 3 coffee brands in South Korea.

== History ==
- In 2001, the company was founded.
- In 2005, it introduced pretzels and honey butter bread to its offerings.
- In 2009, the brand’s 100th location in Korea and 1st location in Australia was opened.
- In 2016, it launched an on-demand delivery service in partnership with RushOrder; LA served as the first test market.

== International Expansion ==
In 2009, the company established its first franchises abroad, opening two stores in Australia and one in Singapore. From then on, it has established branches and franchises across the world, including in the United States, Thailand, the Philippines, Macau, China, Mongolia, Malaysia and Hong Kong. The South China Morning Post estimated that the company had 200 international stores in 2016. However, Tom N Toms’ official website only listed 80 global stores on their 'Global List' as of 2020.

In February 2015, Tom N Toms opened its first branch in the Philippines in Bacolod City.

In September 2015, its first store in Macau was opened.

As of February 2016, there were 6 to 7 retail stores operating in Los Angeles in Koreatown, not including 1 store in Little Tokyo. There were also a few additional stores in other parts of the United States.

On June 23, 2016, Tom N Toms and RushOrder, a mobile-first food ordering technology company, jointly announced the launch of their partnership to offer on-demand delivery and mobile ordering in the US, with Los Angeles being their first test market.

In June 2016, Tom N Tom's opened their first branch in Hong Kong, located in Sha Tin. In September of the same year, Tom N Toms opened its second branch in the Philippines at The Greenery in Mabolo, Cebu City. In December 2016, there were stores across Hong Kong, including Kwun Tong and The ONE, Tsim Sha Tsui.
