= Hotto Motto =

Japanese fast food chain for take out bento

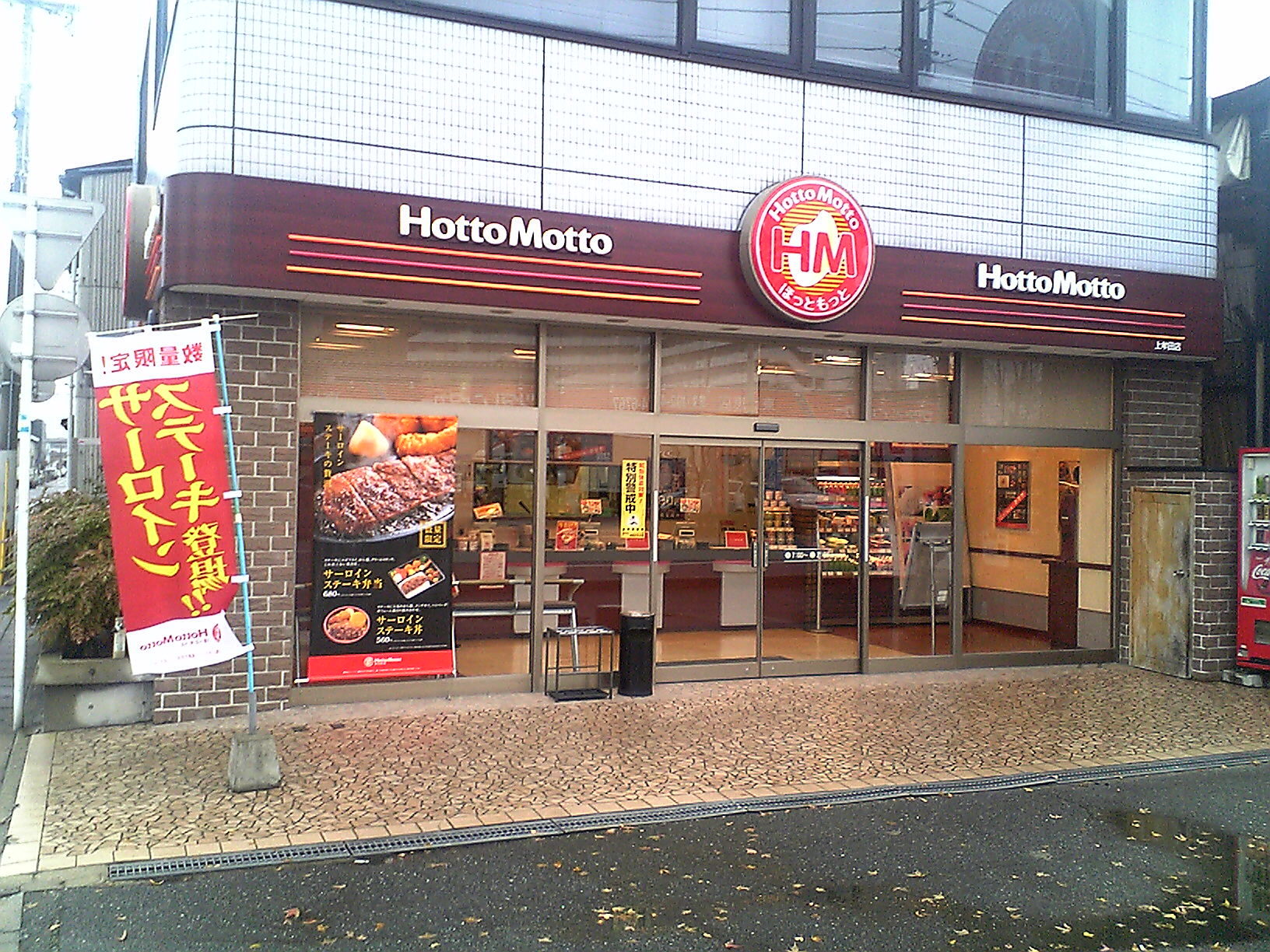
A Hotto Motto store in Fukuoka

Hotto Motto (ほっともっと) is a Japanese fast food chain specializing in take out bento, found in all of Japan's 47 prefectures. It is owned by Plenus, which operates out of the Kyushu-Yamaguchi region. In 2011, it became the sponsor for Kobe Sports Park Baseball Stadium, now known as "Hotto Motto Field Kobe". The chain serves a variety of Japanese classics including chicken karaage, tonkatsu (fried pork steak), chicken katsu (fried fillet), teriyaki salmon, and many others.

== Expansion to Australia ==
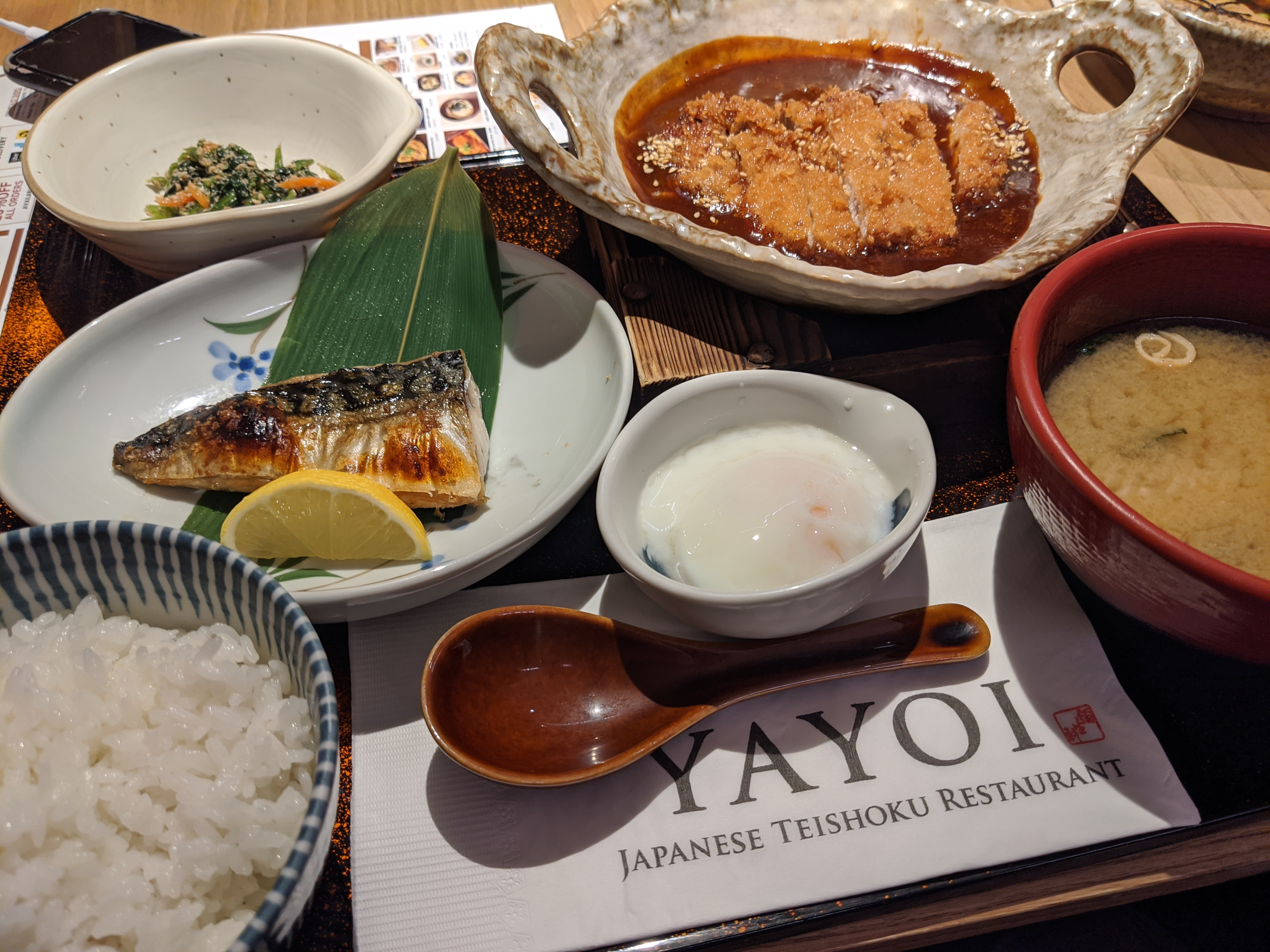
A meal served at a Yayoi restaurant in Sydney

In March 2013, Plenus established an Australian subsidiary known as "PLENUS AusT PTY. LTD". The following year in June 2014, Plenus opened one of their chain noodle restaurants "Yayoi" In Sydney. The following year Plenus opened another Yayoi located in the Galeries shopping center in Sydney. On December 8, 2016, Plenus opened a Hotto Motto shop in The Galeries shopping center, the same center as their second Yayoi restaurant. Although the Sydney Menu has far fewer items than that of a Japanese Hotto Motto, they still have their signature dishes. Plenus hopes their establishment in Australia will allow them to expand their brand within Australia, as well as branch out and diversify to more countries. In September 2019, Hotto Motto's one shop in Australia permanently closed.
