= KLG (restaurant chain) =

Taiwanese fast food chain

- Traditional Chinese: 快樂雞股份有限公司
- Simplified Chinese: 快乐鸡股份有限公司
Transcriptions
Standard Mandarin
- Hanyu Pinyin: Kuàilèjī Gǔfènyǒuxiàngōngsī

KLG (Chinese: 快樂雞; pinyin: Kuàilèjī, referred to as Kuai Le Gee in Malaysia (lit. 'Happy Chicken')) is a Taiwanese fast food chain headquartered in Fengyuan District, Taichung.

Due to loose copyright laws, KLG's branding heavily imitates that of KFC. These can be shown through multiple ways; KLG's menu is similar to KFC's, with fried chicken, french fries, chicken burgers and soft drinks. The lettering of KLG also uses the same font and colour as KFC and the logo depicts a plump chicken wearing a bow tie.

Outside of its home country of Taiwan, KLG has operated outlets in mainland China, Malaysia, South Korea, Thailand, South Africa and the Marshall Islands. In Malaysia, there were several outlets in Ipoh, Penang (near Farlim) and Langkawi Island. On the Marshall Islands, several outlets were known to exist near the country's capital, Majuro.

== See also ==
- List of fast-food chicken restaurants
