= Fast-food restaurant =

Type of restaurant

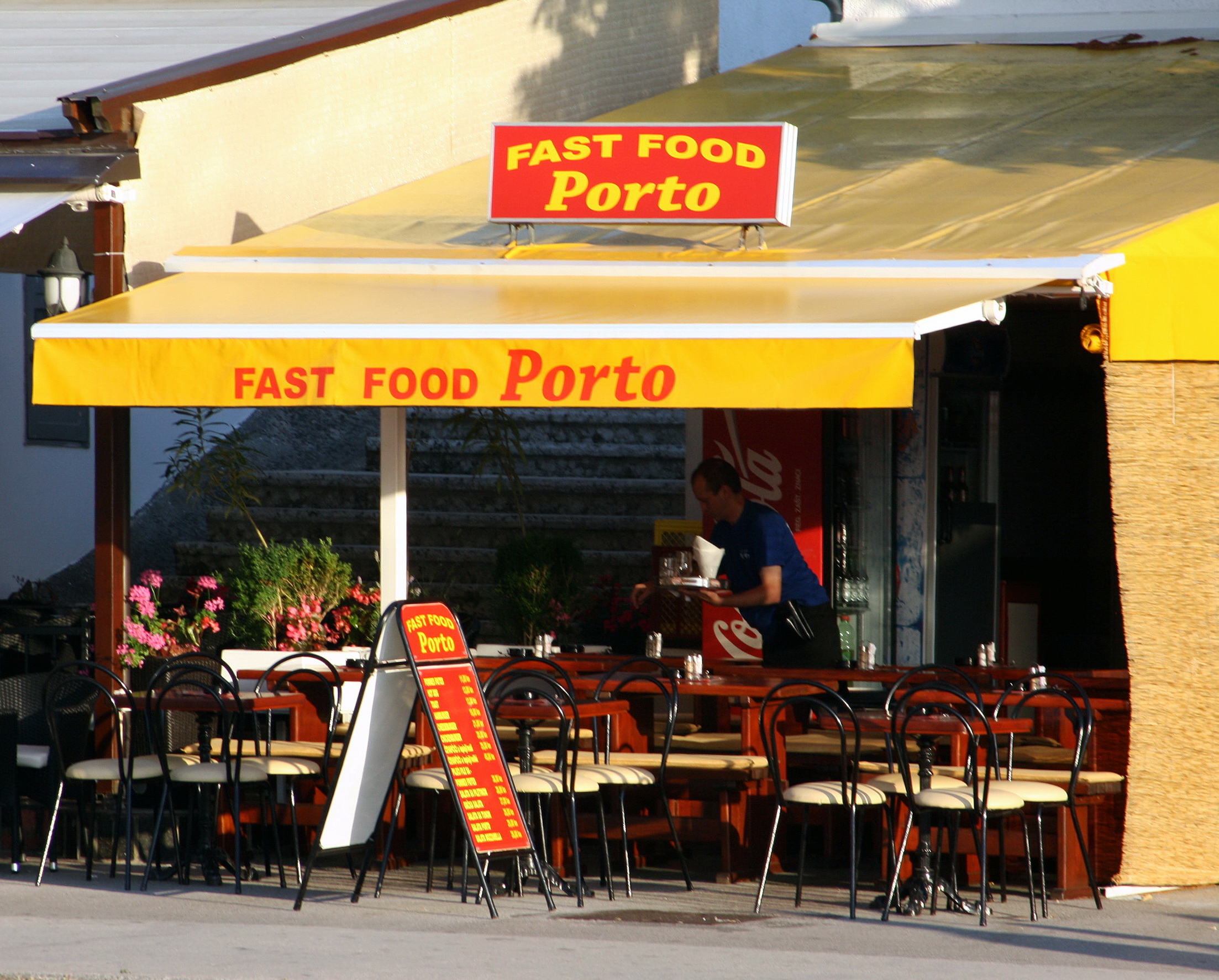
A fast-food restaurant in the port of Malinska, Croatia

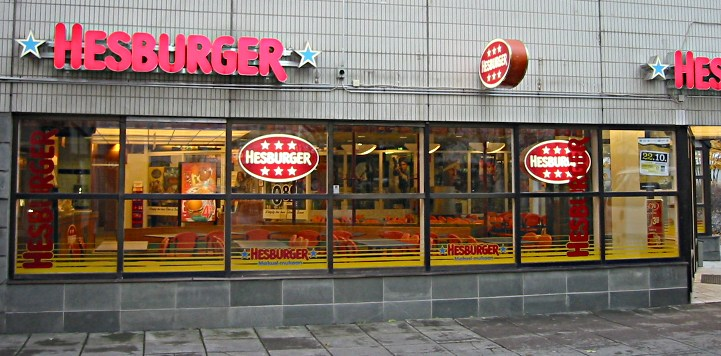
A Hesburger fast-food restaurant in Tapiola, Espoo, Finland

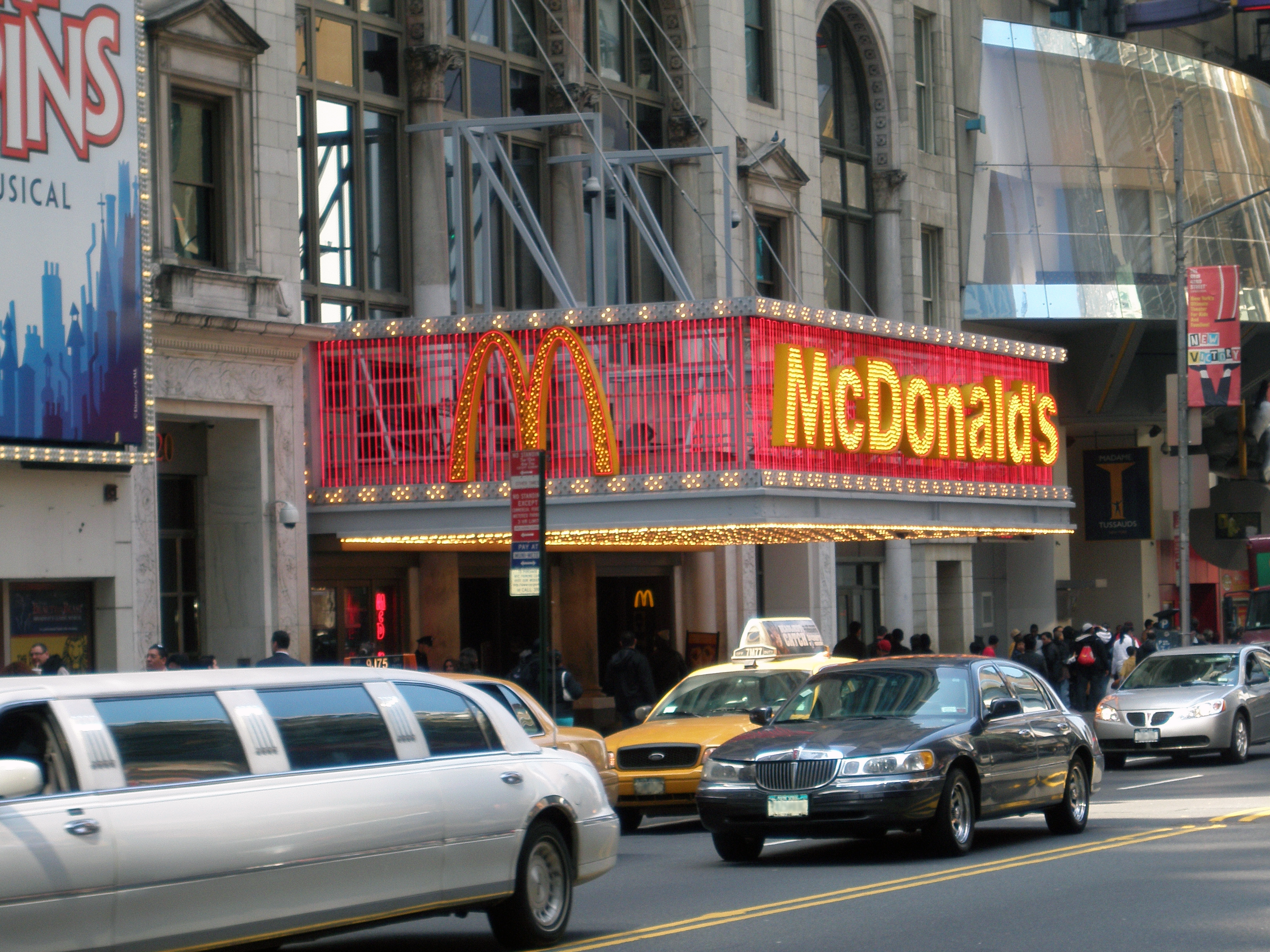
A McDonald's restaurant in New York City

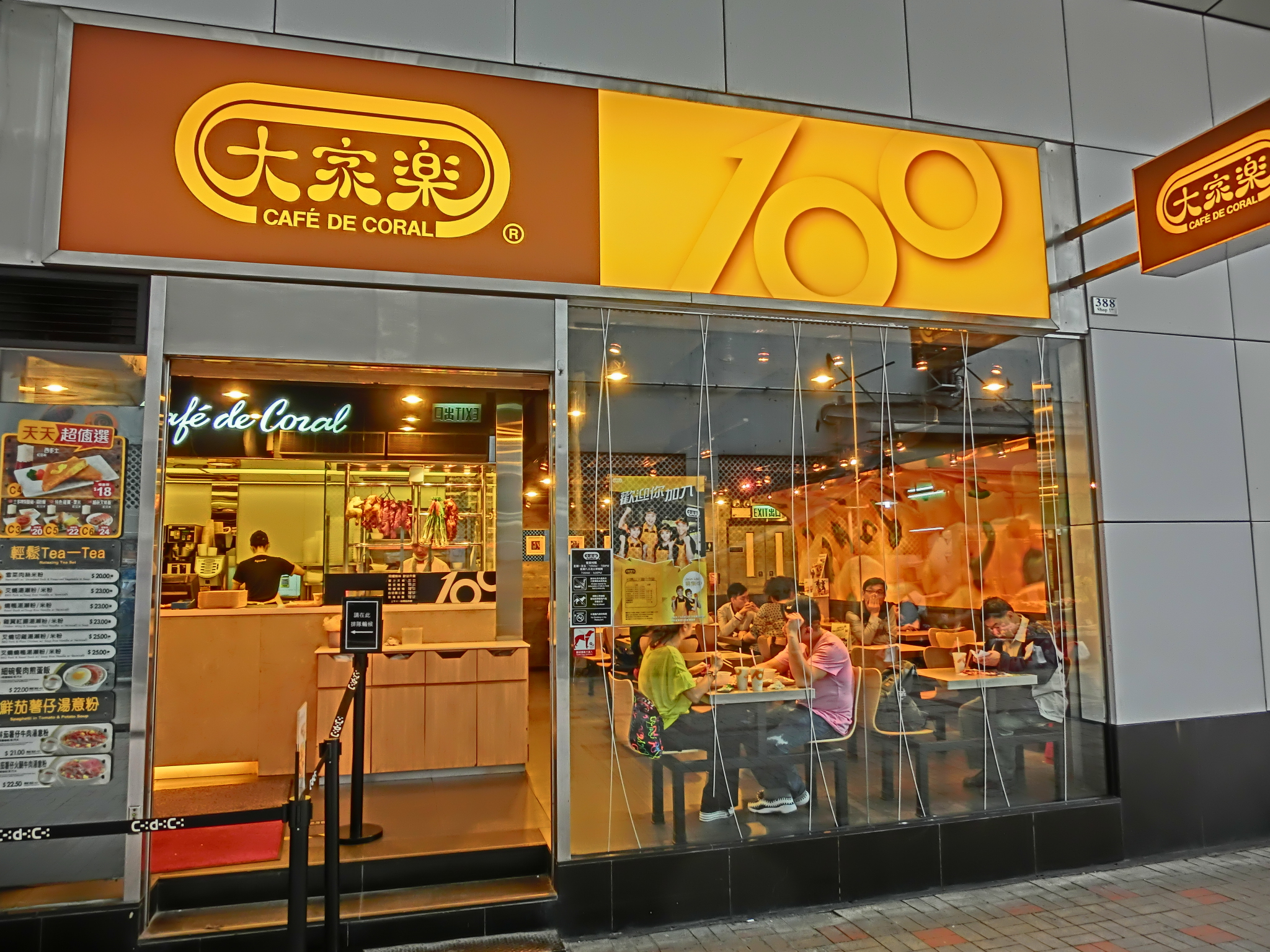
A Café de Coral restaurant in Hong Kong

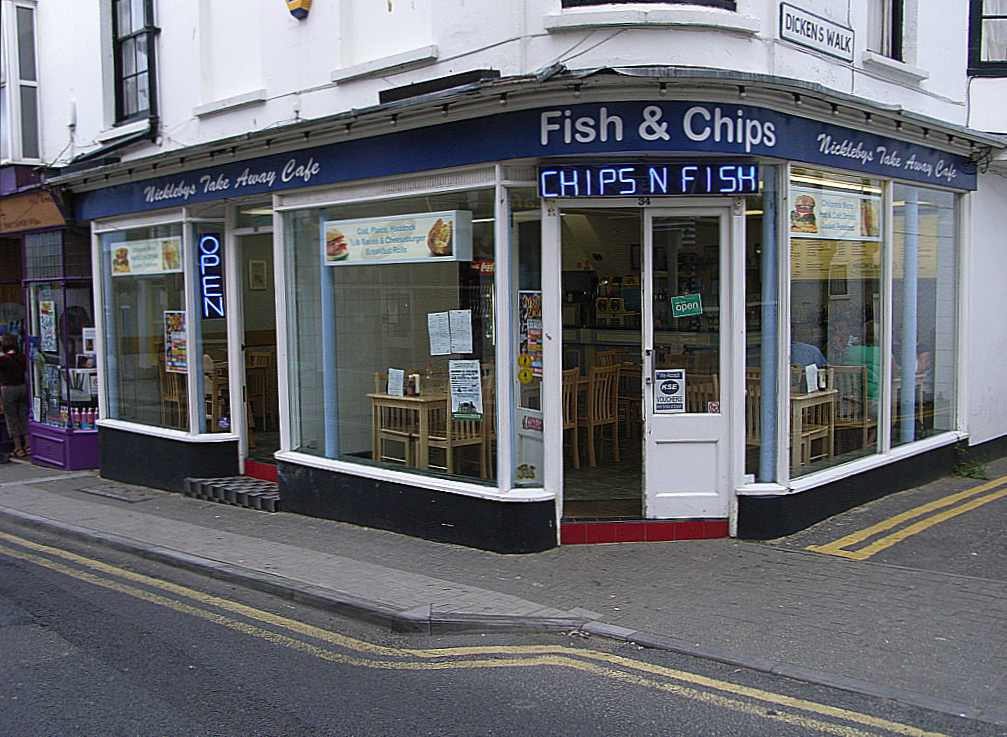
A fish and chip shop in Broadstairs, England

A fast-food restaurant, also known as a quick-service restaurant (QSR) within the industry, is a specific type of restaurant that serves fast-food cuisine and has minimal table service. The food served in fast-food restaurants is typically part of a "meat-sweet diet", offered from a limited menu, cooked in bulk in advance and kept hot, finished and packaged to order, and usually available for take away, though seating may be provided. Fast-food restaurants are typically part of a restaurant chain or franchise operation that provides standardized ingredients and/or partially prepared foods and supplies to each restaurant through controlled supply channels. The term "fast food" was recognized in a dictionary by Merriam–Webster in 1951.

While the first fast-food restaurant in the United States was a White Castle in 1921, fast-food restaurants had been operating elsewhere much earlier, such as the Japanese fast food company Yoshinoya, started in Tokyo in 1899. Today, American-founded fast-food chains such as McDonald's (est. 1940) and KFC (est. 1952) are multinational corporations with outlets across the globe.

Variations on the fast-food restaurant concept include fast-casual restaurants and catering trucks. Fast-casual restaurants have higher sit-in ratios, offering a hybrid between counter-service typical at fast-food restaurants and a traditional table service restaurant. Catering trucks (also called food trucks) often park just outside worksites and are popular with factory workers.

== History ==
In 1896, the first self-service restaurant (the "Stollwerck-Automatenrestaurant") opened in Berlin's Leipziger Straße.

=== United States ===
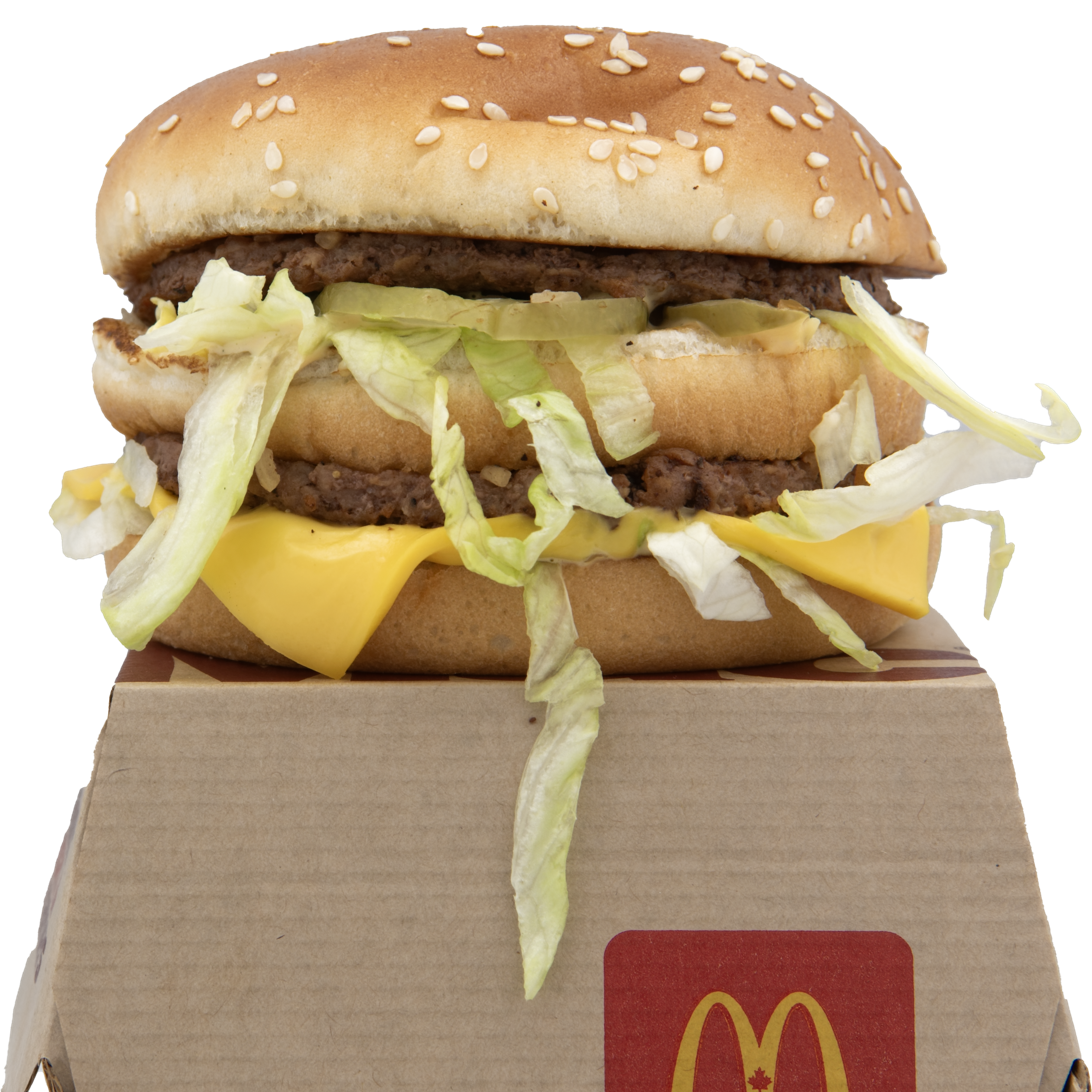
The Big Mac hamburger made its debut in 1967.

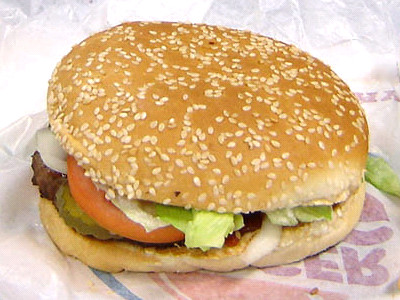
The Burger King Whopper sandwich made its debut in 1957.

Some trace the modern history of fast food in the United States to 7 July 1912, with the opening of a fast-food restaurant called the Automat in New York. The Automat was a cafeteria with its prepared foods behind small glass windows and coin-operated slots. Joseph Horn and Frank Hardart had already opened the first Horn & Hardart Automat in Philadelphia in 1902, but their "Automat" at Broadway and 13th Street, in New York City, created a sensation. Numerous Automat restaurants were built around the country to deal with the demand. Automats remained extremely popular throughout the 1920s and 1930s. The company also popularized the notion of "take-out" food, with their slogan "Less work for Mother".

Most historians agree that the American company White Castle was the first fast-food outlet, starting in Wichita, Kansas in 1916 with food stands and founding in 1921, selling hamburgers for five cents apiece from its inception and spawning numerous competitors and emulators. What is certain, however, is that White Castle made the first significant effort to standardize the food production in, look of, and operation of fast-food hamburger restaurants. William Ingram's and Walter Anderson's White Castle System created the first fast-food supply chain to provide meat, buns, paper goods, and other supplies to their restaurants, pioneered the concept of the multi-state hamburger restaurant chain, standardized the look and construction of the restaurants themselves, and even developed a construction division that manufactured and built the chain's prefabricated restaurant buildings. The McDonald's Speedee Service System and, much later, Ray Kroc's McDonald's outlets and Hamburger University all built on principles, systems and practices that White Castle had already established between 1923 and 1932.

The hamburger restaurant most associated by the public with the term "fast food" was created by two brothers originally from Nashua, New Hampshire. Richard and Maurice McDonald opened a barbecue drive-in in 1940 in the city of San Bernardino, California. After discovering that most of their profits came from hamburgers, the brothers closed their restaurant for three months and reopened it in 1948 as a walk-up stand offering a simple menu of hamburgers, french fries, shakes, coffee, and Coca-Cola, served in disposable paper wrapping. As a result, they could produce hamburgers and fries constantly, without waiting for customer orders, and could serve them immediately; hamburgers cost 15 cents, about half the price at a typical diner. Their streamlined production method, which they named the "Speedee Service System" was influenced by the production line innovations of Henry Ford.

==== 1950s onwards ====
By 1954, The McDonald brothers' stand was restaurant equipment manufacturer Prince Castle's biggest purchaser of milkshake blending machines. Prince Castle salesman Ray Kroc traveled to California to discover why the company had purchased almost a dozen of the units as opposed to the normal one or two found in most restaurants of the time. Enticed by the success of the McDonald's concept, Kroc signed a franchise agreement with the brothers and began opening McDonald's restaurants in Illinois. By 1961, Kroc had bought out the brothers and created what is now the modern McDonald's Corporation. One of the major parts of his business plan was to promote cleanliness of his restaurants to growing groups of Americans that had become aware of food safety issues. As part of his commitment to cleanliness, Kroc often took part in cleaning his own Des Plaines, Illinois outlet by hosing down the garbage cans and scraping gum off the cement. Another concept Kroc added was great swaths of glass which enabled the customer to view the food preparation, a practice still found in chains such as Krispy Kreme. A clean atmosphere was only part of Kroc's grander plan which separated McDonald's from the rest of the competition and attributes to their great success. Kroc envisioned making his restaurants appeal to suburban families.

At roughly the same time as Kroc was conceiving what eventually became McDonald's Corporation, two Miami, Florida businessmen, James McLamore and David Edgerton, opened a franchise of the predecessor to what is now the international fast-food restaurant chain Burger King. McLamore had visited the original McDonald's hamburger stand belonging to the McDonald brothers; sensing potential in their innovative assembly line–based production system, he decided he wanted to open a similar operation of his own. The two partners eventually decided to invest their money in Jacksonville, Florida-based Insta-Burger King. Originally opened in 1953, the founders and owners of the chain, Keith G. Cramer and his wife's uncle Matthew Burns, opened their first stores around a piece of equipment known as the Insta-Broiler. The Insta-Broiler oven proved so successful at cooking burgers, they required all of their franchises to carry the device.

By 1959, McLamore and Edgarton were operating several locations in the Miami-Dade County, Florida area and were growing at a fast clip. Despite the success of their operation, the partners discovered that the design of the insta-broiler made the unit's heating elements prone to degradation from the drippings of the beef patties. The pair eventually created a mechanized gas grill that avoided the problems by changing the way the meat patties were cooked in the unit. After the original company began to falter in 1959, it was purchased by McLamore and Edgerton who renamed the company Burger King.

While fast-food restaurants usually have a seating area in which customers can eat the food on the premises, orders are designed to be taken away, and traditional table service is rare. Orders are generally taken and paid for at a wide counter, with the customer waiting by the counter for a tray or container for their food. A "drive-through" service can allow customers to order and pick up food from their cars.

Nearly from its inception, fast food has been designed to be eaten "on the go" and often does not require traditional cutlery and is eaten as a finger food. Common menu items at fast-food outlets include fish and chips, sandwiches, pitas, hamburgers, fried chicken, french fries, chicken nuggets, tacos, pizza, and ice cream, although many fast-food restaurants offer "slower" foods like chili, mashed potatoes, and salads.

== Cuisine ==
Modern commercial fast food is highly processed and prepared on a large scale from bulk ingredients using standardized cooking and production methods and equipment. It is usually rapidly served in cartons, bags, or in a plastic wrapping, in a fashion which reduces operating costs by allowing rapid product identification and counting, promoting longer holding time, avoiding transfer of bacteria, and facilitating order fulfillment. In most fast-food operations, menu items are generally made from processed ingredients prepared at central supply facilities and then shipped to individual outlets where they are cooked (usually by grill, microwave, or deep-frying) or assembled in a short amount of time either in anticipation of upcoming orders (i.e., "to stock") or in response to actual orders (i.e., "to order"). Following standard operating procedures, pre-cooked products are monitored for freshness and disposed of if holding times become excessive. This process ensures a consistent level of product quality, and is key to delivering the order quickly to the customer and avoiding labor and equipment costs in the individual stores.

Because of commercial emphasis on taste, speed, product safety, uniformity, and low cost, fast-food products are made with ingredients formulated to achieve an identifiable flavor, aroma, texture, and "mouth feel" and to preserve freshness and control handling costs during preparation and order fulfillment. This requires a high degree of food engineering. The use of additives, including salt, sugar, flavorings and preservatives, and processing techniques may limit the nutritional value of the final product.

=== Value meals ===
A value meal is a group of menu items offered together at a lower price than they would cost individually. A hamburger, side of fries, and drink commonly constitute a value meal—or combo depending on the chain. Value meals at fast-food restaurants are common as a merchandising tactic to facilitate bundling, up-selling, and price discrimination. Most of the time they can be upgraded to a larger side and drink for a small fee. The perceived creation of a "discount" on individual menu items in exchange for the purchase of a "meal" is also consistent with the loyalty marketing school of thought.

== Technology ==
Early fast-food production relied on manual, physical methods of tracking orders, such as order wheels.

To make quick service possible and to ensure accuracy and security, many fast-food restaurants have incorporated hospitality point of sale systems. This makes it possible for kitchen crew people to view orders placed at the front counter or drive through in real time. Wireless systems allow orders placed at drive through speakers to be taken by cashiers and cooks. Drive through and walk through configurations will allow orders to be taken at one register and paid at another. Modern point of sale systems can operate on computer networks using a variety of software programs. Sales records can be generated and remote access to computer reports can be given to corporate offices, managers, troubleshooters, and other authorized personnel.

Food service chains partner with food equipment manufacturers to design highly specialized restaurant equipment, often incorporating heat sensors, timers, and other electronic controls into the design. Collaborative design techniques, such as rapid visualization and computer-aided design of restaurant kitchens are now being used to establish equipment specifications that are consistent with restaurant operating and merchandising requirements.

== Business ==
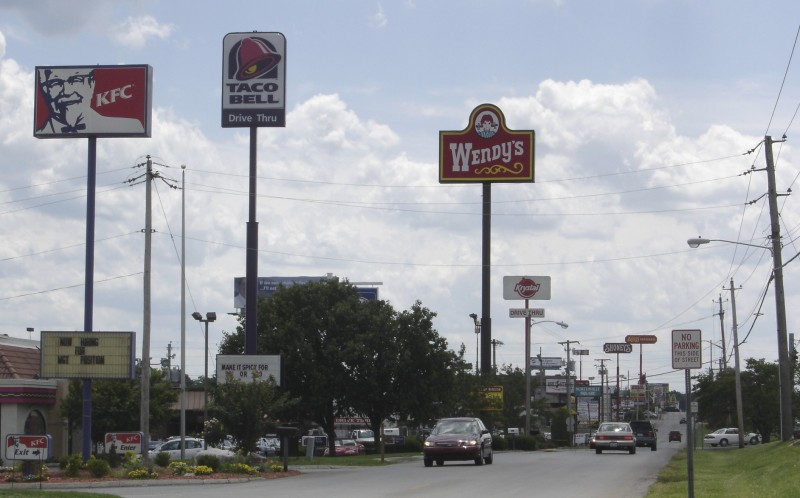
Neighboring fast-food restaurant advertisement signs in Bowling Green, Kentucky, US. Here, KFC, Taco Bell, Wendy's, and Krystal Burgers can be seen.

McDonald's fast-food restaurant at Kulim, Kedah, Malaysia

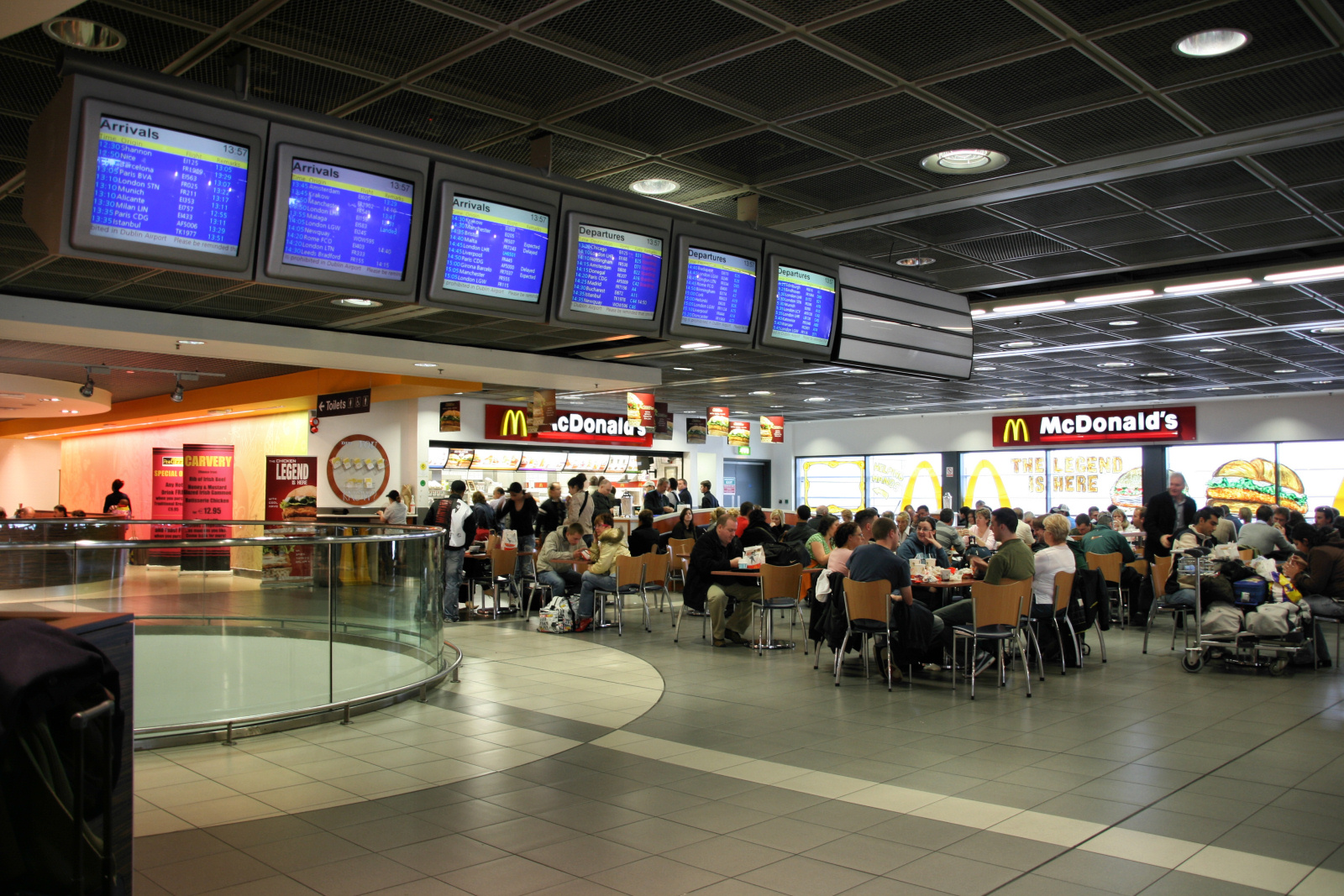
McDonald's fast-food restaurant at Dublin Airport

=== Consumer spending ===
In the United States, consumers spent about $110 billion on fast food in 2000 (up from $6 billion in 1970). The National Restaurant Association forecast that fast-food restaurants in the US would reach $142 billion in sales in 2006, a 5% increase over 2005. In comparison, the full-service restaurant segment of the food industry is expected to generate $173 billion in sales. Fast food has been losing market share to so-called fast-casual restaurants, which offer more robust and expensive cuisines.

=== Major international brands ===
McDonald's, a fast-food supplier, opened its first franchised restaurant in the US in 1955 (1974 in the UK). It has become a phenomenally successful enterprise in terms of financial growth, brand-name recognition, and worldwide expansion. Ray Kroc, who bought the franchising license from the McDonald brothers, pioneered concepts which emphasized standardization. He introduced uniform products, identical in all respects at each outlet, to increase sales. Kroc also insisted on cutting food costs as much as possible, eventually using the McDonald's Corporation's size to force suppliers to conform to this ethos.

Other prominent international fast-food companies include Burger King, the number two hamburger chain in the world, known for promoting its customized menu offerings (Have it Your Way). Another international fast-food chain is KFC, which sells chicken-related products and is the number 1 fast-food company in the People's Republic of China.

=== Franchising ===
A fast-food chain restaurant is generally owned either by the parent company of the fast-food chain or a franchisee – an independent party given the right to use the company's trademark and trade name. In the latter case, a contract is made between the franchisee and the parent company, typically requiring the franchisee to pay an initial, fixed fee in addition to a continual percentage of monthly sales. Upon opening for business, the franchisee oversees the day-to-day operations of the restaurant and acts as a manager of the store. Once the contract expires, the parent company may choose to "renew the contract, sell the franchise to another franchisee, or operate the restaurant itself." In most fast-food chains, the number of franchised locations exceeds the number of company owned locations.

Fast-food chains rely on consistency and uniformity, in internal operations and brand image, across all of their restaurant locations in order to convey a sense of reliability to their customers. This sense of reliability coupled with a positive customer experience brings customers to place trust in the company. This sense of trust leads to increased customer loyalty which gives the company a source of recurring business. When a person is presented with a choice of different restaurants to eat at, it is much easier for them to stick with what they know, rather than to take a gamble and dive into the unknown.

Due to the importance of consistency, most companies set standards unifying their various restaurant locations with a set of common rules and regulations. Parent companies often rely on field representatives to ensure that the practices of franchised locations are consistent with the company's standards. However, the more locations a fast-food chain has, the harder it is for the parent company to guarantee that these standards are being followed. Moreover, it is much more expensive to discharge a franchisee for noncompliance with company standards, than it is to discharge an employee for that same reason. As a consequence, parent companies tend to deal with franchisee violations in a more relaxed manner.

Many companies also adapt to their different local areas to support the needs of the customers. Sometimes it is necessary for a franchisee to modify the way the restaurant/store runs to meet the needs of local customers. As referenced in Bodey's "Localization and Customer Retention for Franchise Service Systems" article, J. L. Bradach claims that a franchise will either use the tactical or strategic local response. Tactical applies to accounting for hiring of personnel and suppliers as well as financial decisions to adapt to the local customers. Strategic applies to the specific characteristics of the franchise that will change from the basic format followed by all to fit in the local area.

For the most part, someone visiting a McDonald's in the United States will have the same experience as someone visiting a McDonald's in Japan. The interior design, the menu, the speed of service, and the taste of the food will all be very similar. However, some differences do exist to tailor to particular cultural differences. For example, in October 2005, amid plummeting sales in Japan, McDonald's added a shrimp burger to the Japanese menu; a 1989 study stated that global shrimp consumption was "led by Japan."

In March 2010, Taco Bell opened their first restaurant in India. Because non-consumption of beef is a cultural norm in light of India's Dharmic beliefs, Taco Bell had to tailor its menu to the dietary distinctions of Indian culture by replacing all of the beef with chicken. By the same token, completely meatless options were introduced to the menu due to the prevalence of vegetarianism throughout the country.

== Countries ==
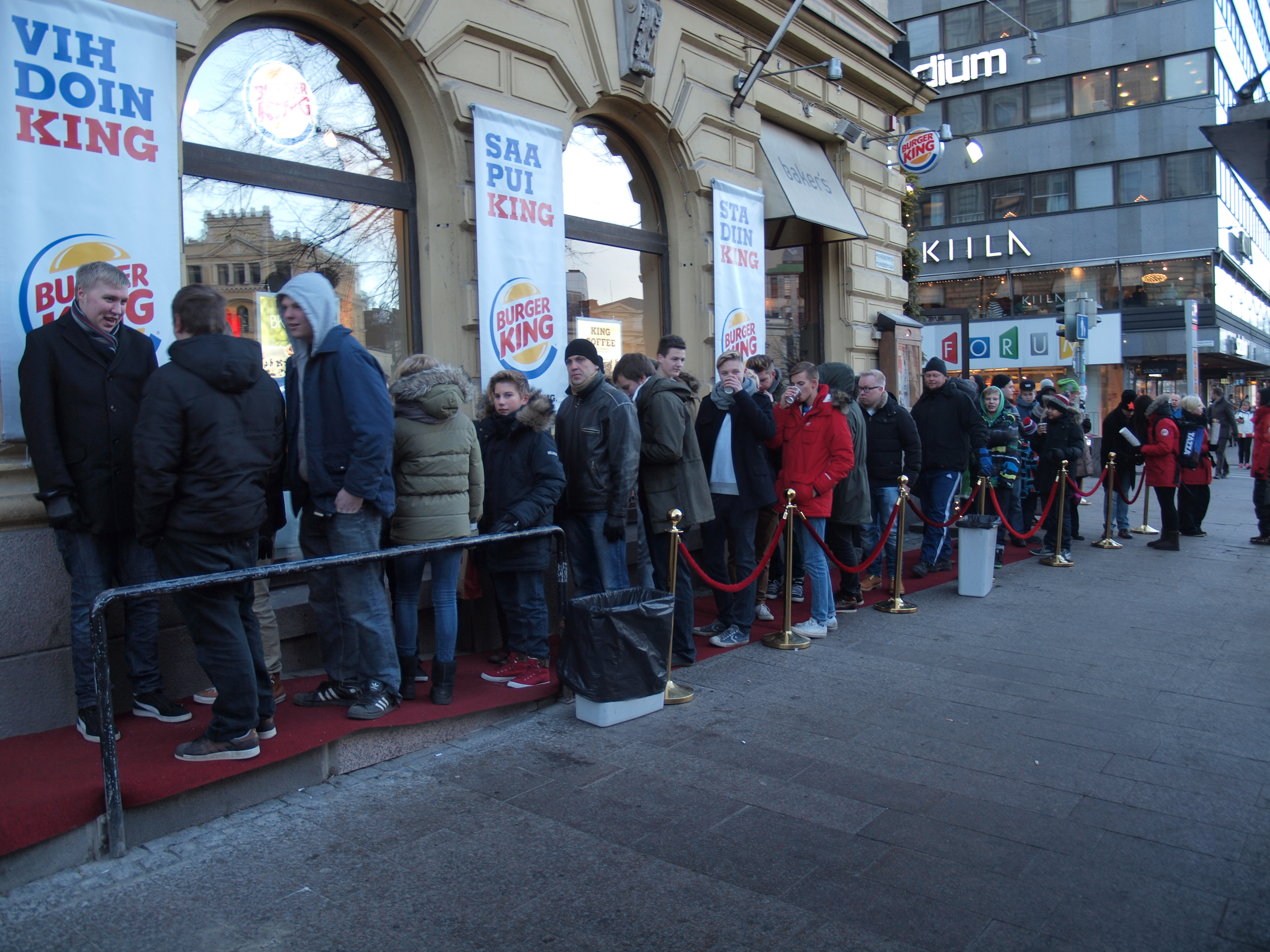
People queuing to Burger King along the Mannerheimintie street in Helsinki, Finland

Multinational corporations typically modify their menus to cater to local tastes, and most overseas outlets are owned by native franchisees. McDonald's in India, for example, uses chicken and paneer rather than beef and pork in their burgers because Hinduism traditionally forbids eating beef. In Israel some McDonald's restaurants are kosher and respect the Jewish Shabbat; there is also a kosher McDonald's in Argentina. In Egypt, Indonesia, Morocco, Saudi Arabia, Malaysia, Pakistan, and Singapore, all menu items are halal.

=== North America ===
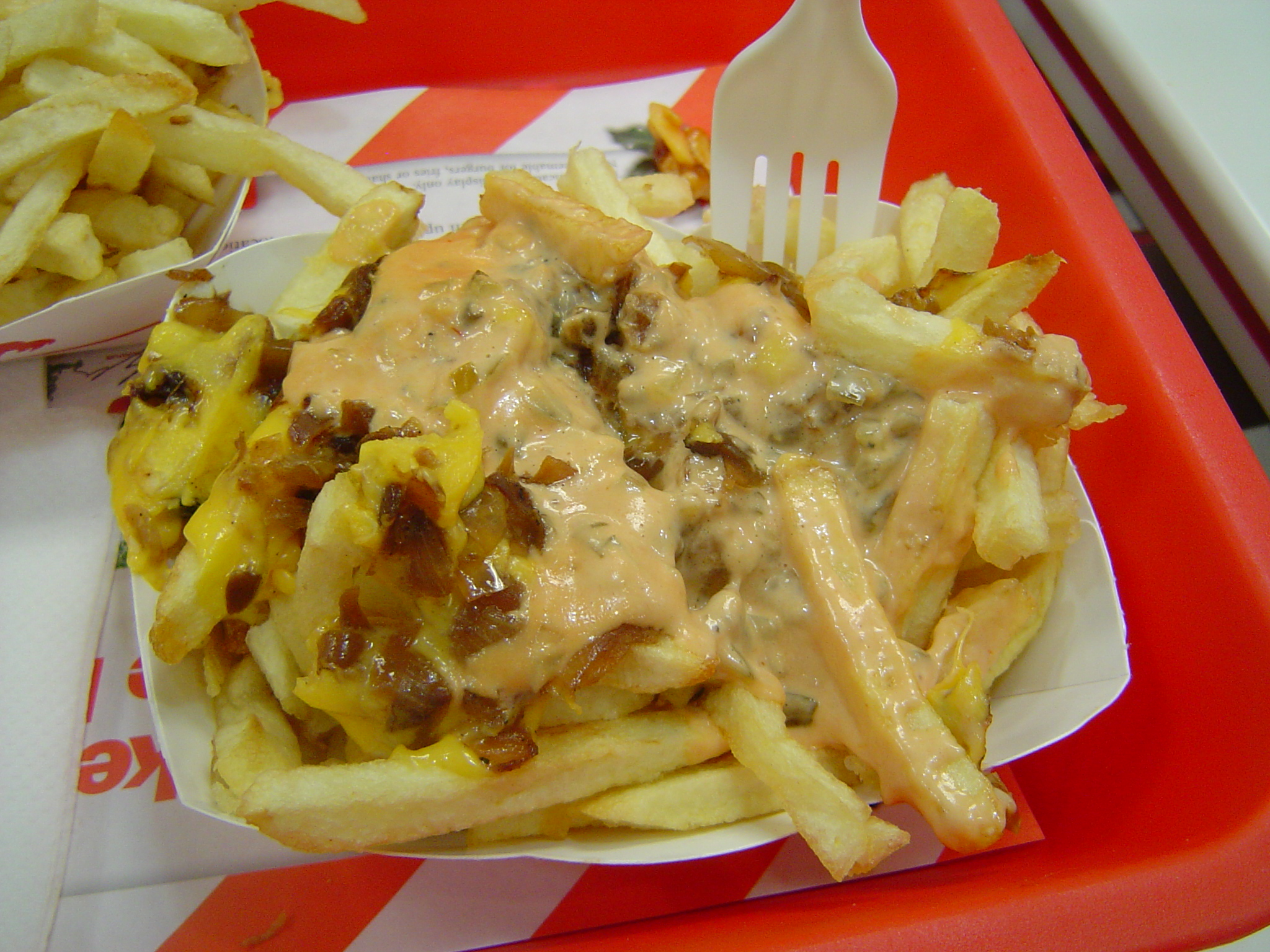
Animal fries from In-N-Out Burger's secret menu

Many fast-food operations have more local and regional roots, such as White Castle in the Midwestern US, along with Hardee's (owned by CKE Restaurants, which also owns Carl's Jr., whose locations are primarily on the US West Coast); Krystal, Bojangles' Famous Chicken 'n Biscuits, Cook Out, and Zaxby's restaurants in the US Southeast; Raising Cane's in Louisiana and other mostly Southern US states; Hot 'n Now in Michigan and Wisconsin; In-N-Out Burger (in California, Arizona, Nevada, Utah, and Texas, with a few locations in Oregon) and Original Tommy's chains in Southern California; Dick's Drive-In in Seattle and Arctic Circle in Utah and other Western US states; Halo Burger around Flint, Michigan, and Burgerville in the Portland, Oregon, area. Also, Whataburger is a popular burger chain in the American South, and Jack in the Box is located in the West and South. Canada pizza chains Topper's Pizza and Pizza Pizza are primarily located in Ontario. Coffee chain Country Style operates only in Ontario, and competes with the coffee and donut chain Tim Hortons. Maid-Rite restaurant is one of the oldest chain fast-food restaurants in the United States. Founded in 1926, their specialty is a loose meat hamburger. Maid-Rites can be found in the US Midwest - mainly Iowa, Minnesota, Illinois, and Missouri.

International brands dominant in North America include McDonald's, Burger King and Wendy's, the number three burger chain in the US; Dunkin' Donuts, a New England–based chain; automobile oriented Sonic Drive-In's from Oklahoma City; Starbucks, Seattle-born coffee-based fast-food beverage corporation; KFC and Taco Bell, which are both part of the largest restaurant conglomerate in the world, Yum! Brands; and Domino's Pizza, a pizza chain known for popularizing home delivery of fast food.

Subway is known for their sub sandwiches and are the largest restaurant chain to serve such food items. Quiznos, a Denver-based sub shop, is another fast-growing sub chain, yet with over 6,000 locations it is still far behind Subway's 34,000 locations. Other smaller sub shops include Blimpie, Jersey Mike's Subs, Mr. Goodcents, Jimmy John's, Potbelly Sandwich Shop, Penn Station, and Firehouse.

A&W Restaurants was originally a United States and Canada fast-food brand, but it is currently an International fast-food corporation in several countries.

In Canada the majority of fast-food chains are American owned or were originally American owned but have since set up a Canadian management/headquarters locations such as Panera Bread, Chipotle Mexican Grill, Five Guys, and Carl's Jr. Although the case is usually American fast-food chains expanding into Canada, Canadian chains such as Tim Hortons have expanded into 22 states in the United States, but are more prominent in border states such as New York and Michigan. Tim Hortons has started to expand to other countries outside of North America. The Pita Pit franchise originated in Canada and has expanded to the United States and other Countries. The Canadian Extreme Pita franchise sells low fat and salt pita sandwiches with stores in the larger Canadian cities. Other Canadian fast-food chains such as Manchu Wok serve North American style Asian foods; this company is located mainly in Canada and the US, with other outlets on US military bases on other continents. Harvey's is a Canadian-only burger restaurant chain, present in every province.

=== Oceania ===
==== Australia ====
Australia's fast-food market began in the late 1960s and early 1970s, with the opening of several American franchises including KFC (1968), Pizza Hut (1970), and McDonald's (1971), followed by Burger King. However, the Burger King market found that this name was already a registered trademark to a takeaway food shop in Adelaide. Thus, the Burger King Australian market was forced to pick another name, selecting the Hungry Jack's brand name. Prior to this, the Australian fast-food market consisted primarily of privately owned take-away shops.

==== New Zealand ====
In New Zealand, the fast-food market began in the 1970s with KFC (opened 1971), Pizza Hut (1974), and McDonald's (1976), and all three remain popular today. Burger King and Domino's entered the market later in the 1990s. Australian pizza chains Eagle Boys and Pizza Haven also entered the market in the 1990s, but their New Zealand operations were later sold to Pizza Hut and Domino's.

A few fast-food chains have been founded in New Zealand, including Burger Fuel (founded 1995), Georgie Pie (founded 1977, but closed 1998 after falling into financial trouble and being bought out by McDonald's) and Hell Pizza (founded 1996).

=== Europe ===
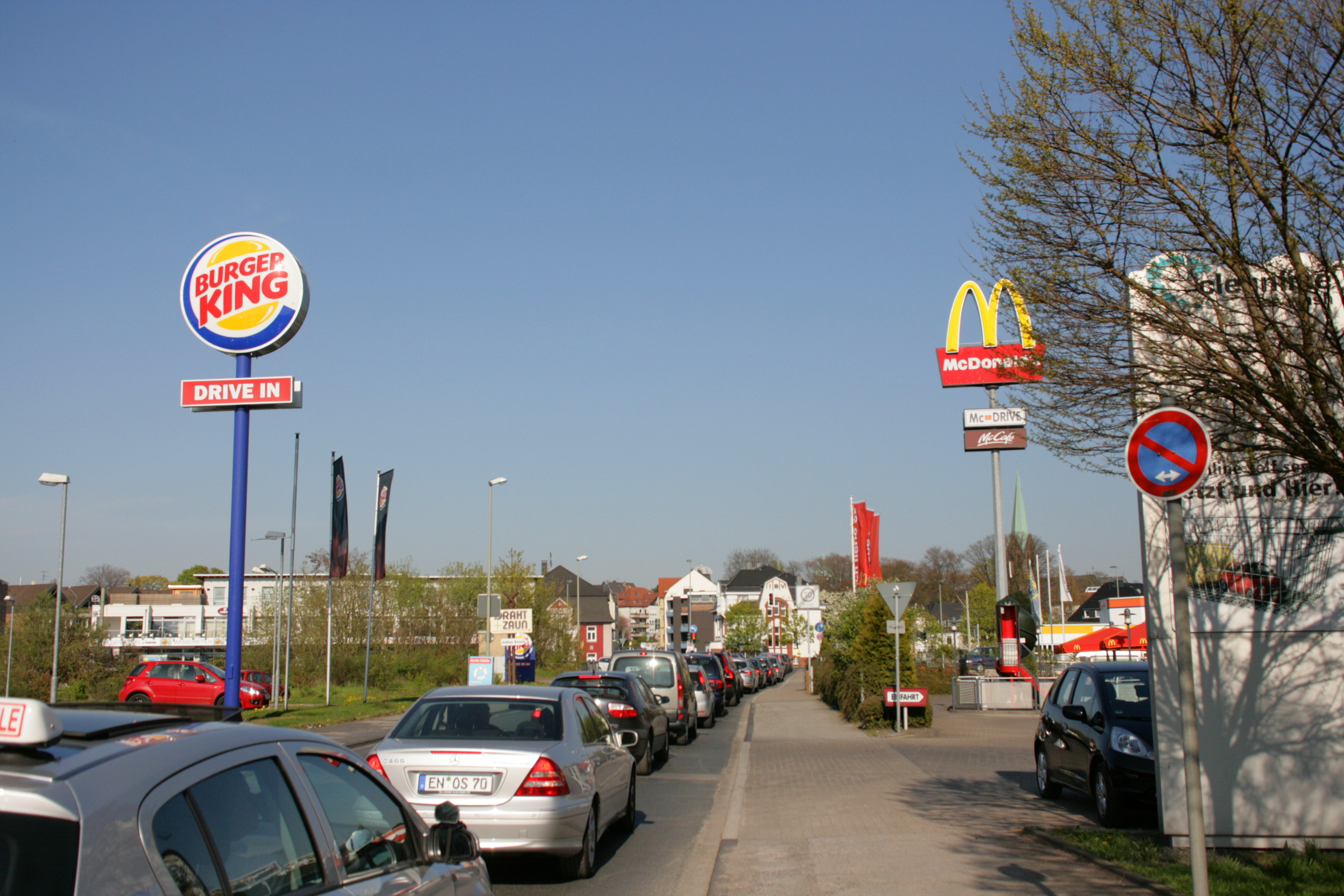
Neighboring fast-food restaurants in Hattingen, Germany

==== United Kingdom ====
The United Kingdom's signature type of fast-food restaurant is a fish and chip shop, which specializes in fish and chips and also other foods such as kebabs and burgers. Fish and chip shops are usually owned independently.

Burger brands like Wimpy remain, although the majority of branches became Burger King in 1989.

==== Netherlands ====
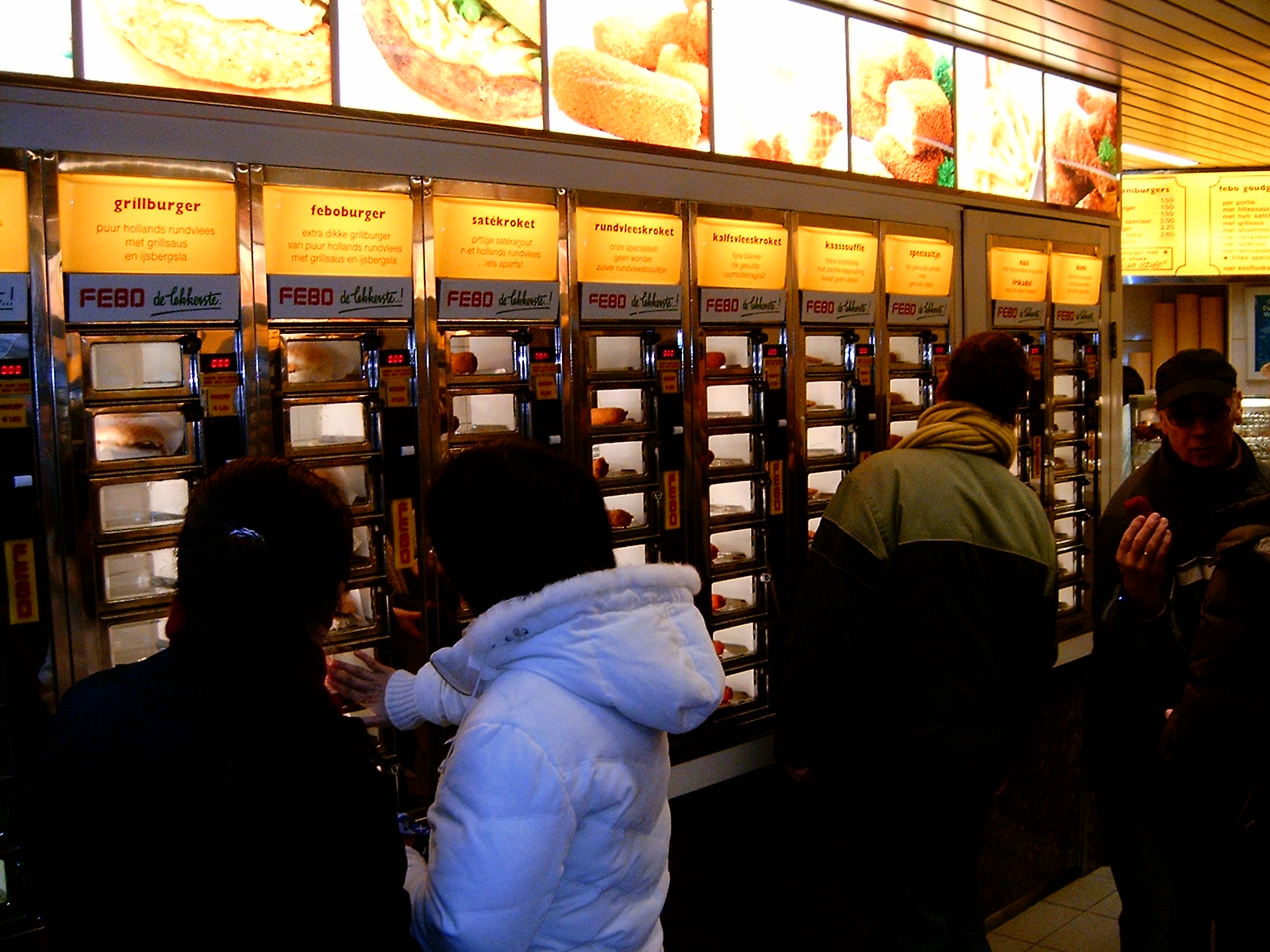
FEBO in Amsterdam with automats

In the Netherlands, walk-up fast-food restaurants with automatieken, a typical Dutch vending machine, are found throughout the country, most notably in Amsterdam. In this automatic format, a counter is available for purchasing French fries, beverages, krokets, frikandellen, kaassoufflés and hamburgers and other snacks can be bought from the automats. FEBO is one of the largest of such types of fast-food restaurants with automats.

==== Ireland ====
In addition to home-grown chains such as Supermac's, numerous American chains such as McDonald's and Burger King have also established a presence in Ireland. In 2015, a study developed by Treated.com was published in The Irish Times, which named Swords, County Dublin as Ireland's 'fast-food capital'.

As of December 2024, the Republic of Ireland had a higher concentration of fast-food outlets per capita (28.7 per 100,000 people) than both Northern Ireland (22.4) and the rest of the UK (27.6). While international chains are widespread, Irish brands dominate certain market segments; in the pizza market, local chains account for 67% of traffic.

==== Czech Republic ====
Bageterie Boulevard is a Czech fast food chain, headquartered in Prague, which began in 2003 with the opening of its first location in the Dejvice district. Today, the brand operates numerous restaurants in both the Czech Republic and Slovakia.

=== Asia ===
==== Hong Kong ====
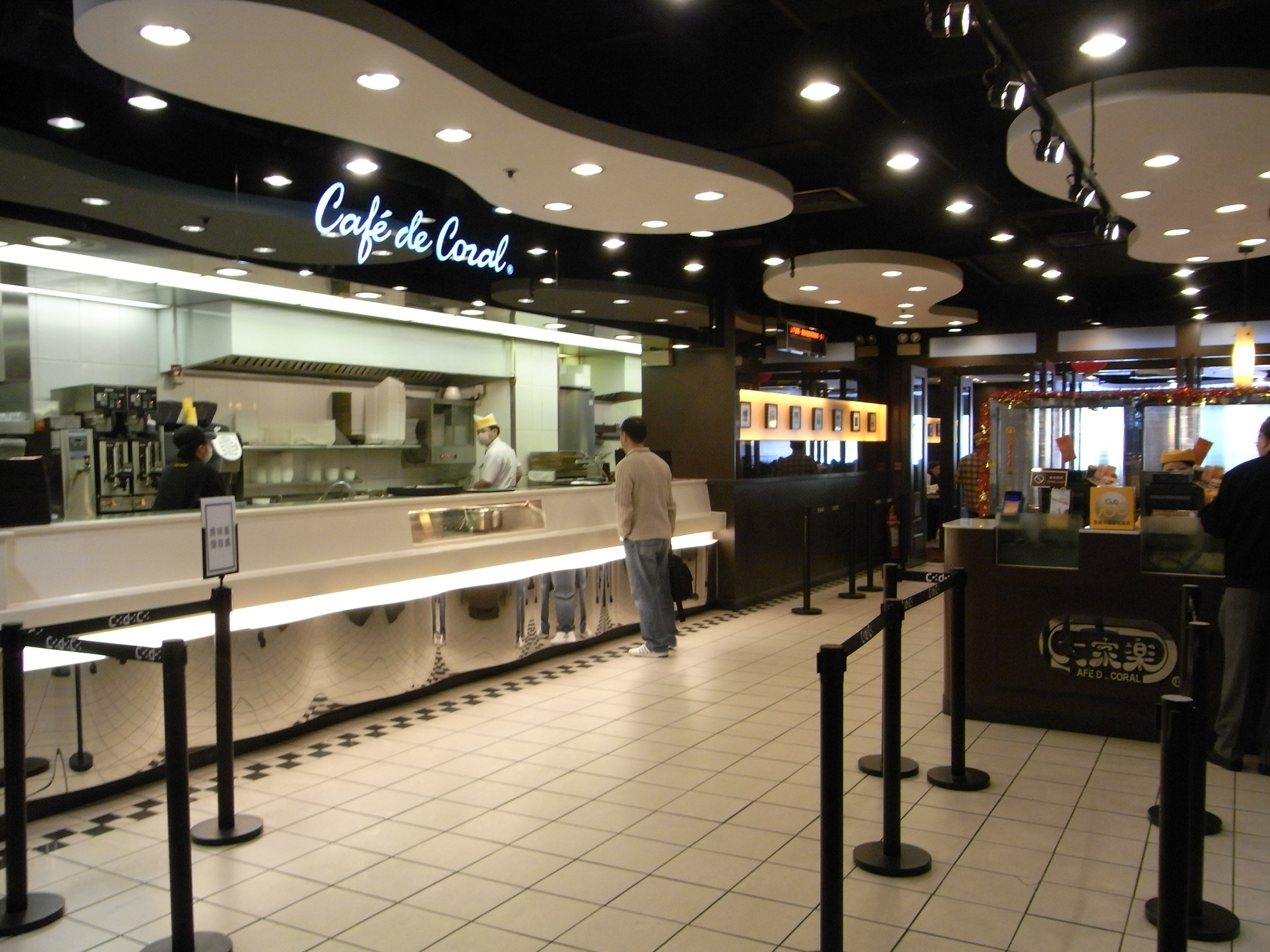
A Café de Coral branch in Admiralty

In Hong Kong, although McDonald's and KFC are quite popular, three major local fast-food chains provide Hong Kong-style fast food, namely Café de Coral, Fairwood, and Maxim MX. Café de Coral alone serves more than 300,000 customers daily. Unlike western fast-food chains, these restaurants offer four different menus at different times of the day, namely breakfast, lunch, afternoon tea, and dinner. Siu mei is offered throughout the day.

Dai pai dong and traditional Hong Kong street food may be considered close relatives of the conventional fast-food outlet.

==== India ====
The major fast-food chains in India that serve American fast food are KFC, McDonald's, Starbucks, Burger King, Subway, Pizza Hut, and Dominos. Most of these have had to make a lot of changes to their standard menus to cater to Indian food habits and taste preferences. Some emerging Indian food chains include Wow! Momo, Haldiram's, Faaso's and Café Coffee Day.

Food habits vary widely across states within India. While typical idli and dosa is fast food in Southern India, in Maharashtra it is misal-pav, pav-bhaji, and poha. Further north in Punjab and Haryana, chole-bhature are very popular and in Bihar and Jharkhand litti-chokha is their staple fast food.

==== Indonesia ====
Fast food in Indonesia is led by both American and local chains, many of which adapt their menus to local tastes and provide halal options. A 2024 survey showed KFC, McDonald's, and HokBen as the most popular brands, with Burger King, A&W and Richeese Factory also among the top six.

==== Israel ====
In Israel, local burger chain Burger Ranch is popular as are McDonald's and Burger King. Domino's Pizza is also a popular fast-food restaurant. Chains like McDonald's offer kosher branches. Intrinsically non-kosher foods such as cheeseburgers are rare in Israeli fast-food chains, even in non-kosher branches. There are many small local fast-food chains that serve pizza, hamburgers, sushi and local foods such as hummus, falafel and shawarma.

==== Japan ====
American chains such as Domino's Pizza, McDonald's, Pizza Hut, and KFC have a big presence in Japan, but local gyudon chains such as Sukiya, Matsuya and Yoshinoya also blanket the country. Japan has its own burger chains including MOS Burger, Lotteria and Freshness Burger.

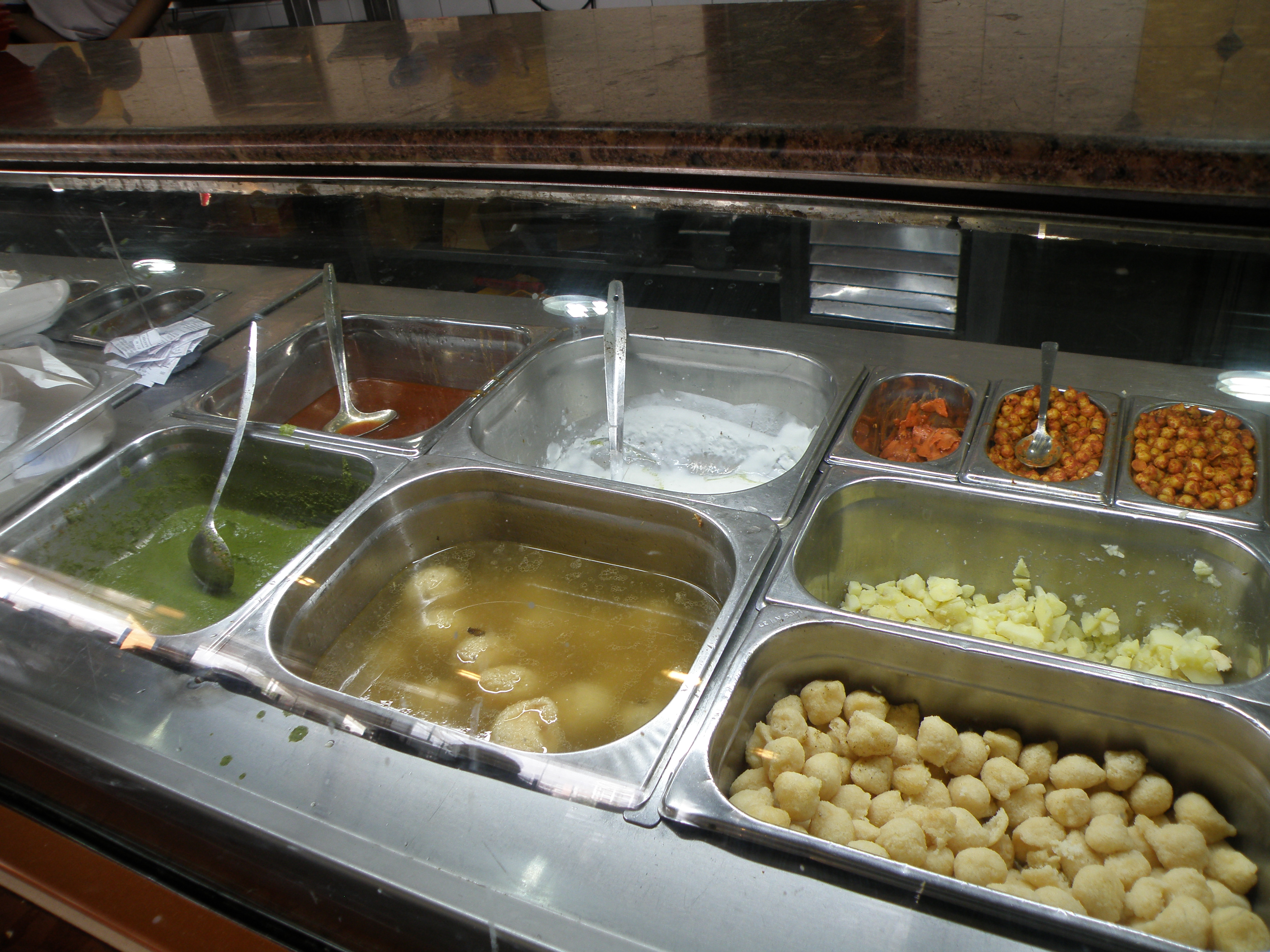
Ready-made food at a Haldiram's restaurant in Delhi for quick service

==== Pakistan ====
Fast food In Pakistan varies. There are many international chains serving fast food, including Nandos, Burger King, KFC, McDonald's, Domino's Pizza, Fatburger, Dunkin' Donuts, Subway, Pizza Hut, Hardee's, Telepizza, Steak Escape and Gloria Jean's Coffees. In addition to the international chains, in local cuisine people in Pakistan like to have biryani, bun kebabs, Nihari, kebab rolls etc. as fast food.

==== Philippines ====
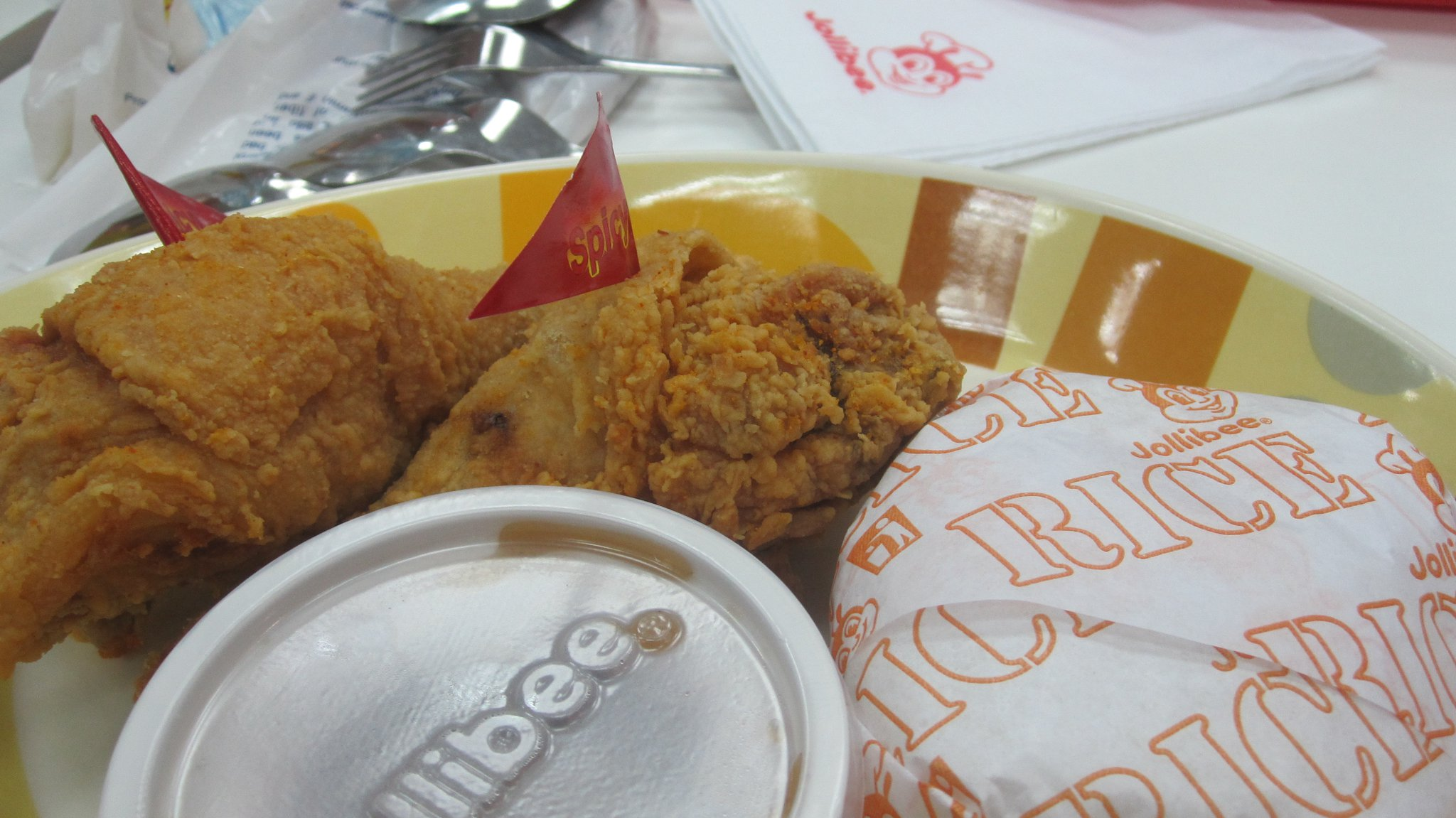
Two pieces of Chicken Joy from Jollibee, the chain's core product, along with a serving of rice

In the Philippines, fast-food is the same as in the US. However, the only difference is that they serve Filipino dishes and a few American products being served Filipino-style. Jollibee is the leading fast-food chain in the country with 1,000 stores nationwide.

==== Russia ====
Most international fast-food chains like Subway, McDonald's, Burger King etc. are represented in major Russian cities. There are also local chains like Teremok specializing in Russian cuisine or having elements of it added into their menu.

==== Saudi Arabia ====
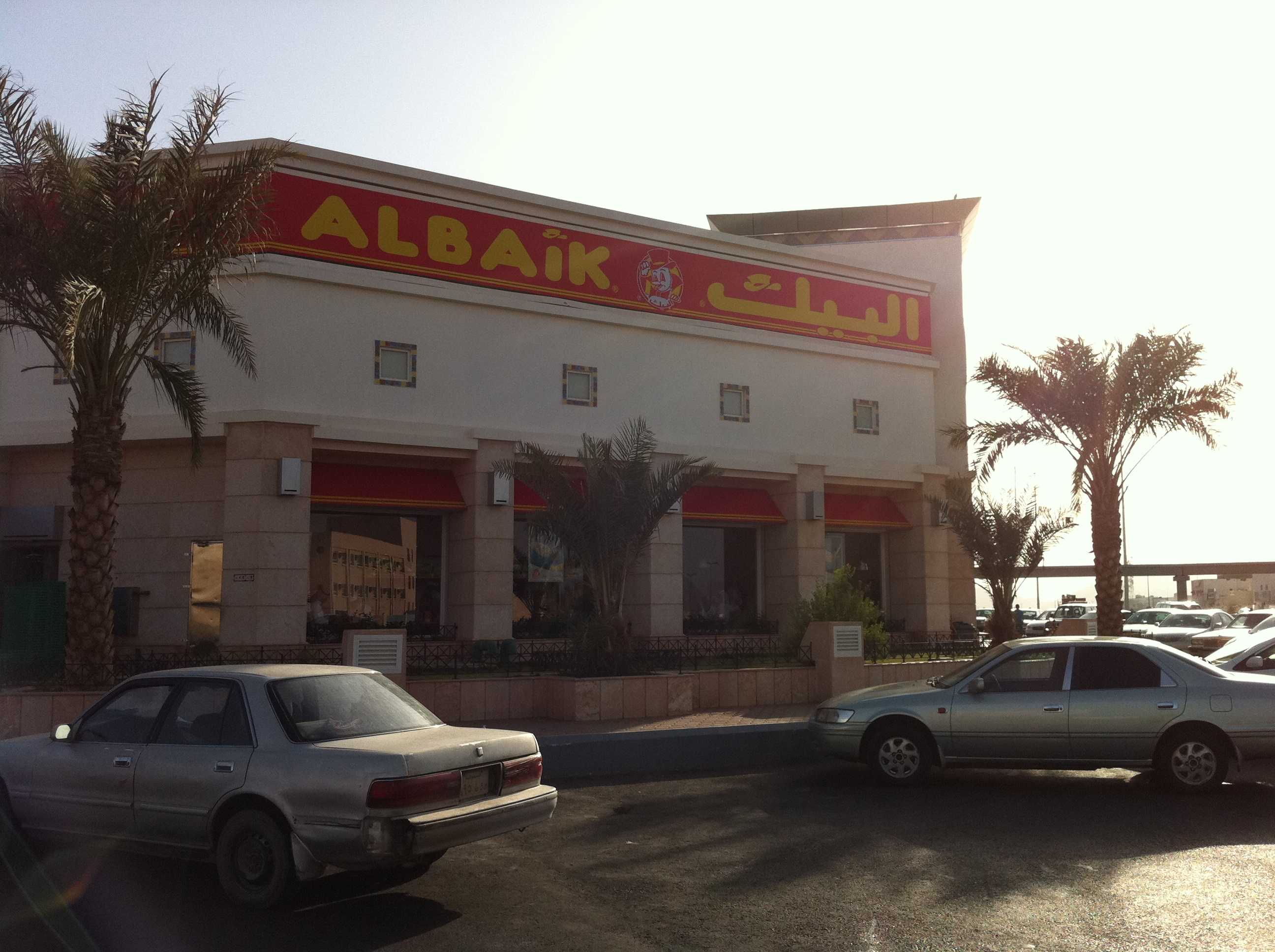
A franchise of Albaik in Medina, Medina Province, Saudi Arabia

Saudi Arabia has many international fast-food chains including KFC, Burger King, McDonald's and many others. However, the most popular fast-food restaurant of Saudi Arabia is Albaik. Saudis regard Albaik as better than KFC.

==== Taiwan ====
Notable Taiwanese fast-food restaurants include 85C Bakery Cafe, TKK Fried Chicken, and Bafang Dumpling.

=== Africa ===
==== Nigeria ====
In Nigeria, Mr. Bigg's, Chicken Republic, Tantalizers, and Tastee Fried Chicken are the predominant fast-food chains. KFC and Domino's Pizza have recently entered the country.

==== South Africa ====
KFC is the most popular fast-food chain in South Africa according to a 2010 Sunday Times survey. Chicken Licken, Wimpy and Ocean Basket along with Nando's, Steers and Hungry Lion are examples of homegrown franchises that are highly popular within the country. McDonald's, Subway and Pizza Hut have a significant presence within South Africa.

== Trends ==
=== Health concerns ===
Some of the large fast-food chains are beginning to incorporate healthier alternatives in their menu, e.g., white meat, snack wraps, salads, and fresh fruit. However, some people see these moves as a tokenistic and commercial measure, rather than an appropriate reaction to ethical concerns about the world ecology and people's health. McDonald's announced that in March 2006 they would include nutritional information on the packaging of all of its products in the United States.

In September and October 2000, during the StarLink corn recall, up to $50 million worth of corn-based foods were recalled from restaurants as well as supermarkets. The products contained StarLink genetically modified corn that was not approved for human consumption. It was the first-ever recall of a genetically modified food. The environmental group Friends of the Earth that had first detected the contaminated shells was critical of the FDA for not doing its own job.

Fast food is commonly blamed for the obesity epidemic in the United States today. 60% of Americans today are either overweight or obese. With obesity especially being seen among children, places like McDonald's and other fast-food restaurants take the majority of the blame. 34% of children and adolescents consume fast food on any given day, while 80% of children claim that McDonald's is their favorite place to eat at. The number of children and adolescents as well as adults eating out every day is only seen to progress and rise. Research concludes that children and adolescents ranging from twelve to nineteen years old consume twice as many calories from fast-food restaurants than children ranging from two to eleven years old.

The FDA found that trans fats raises the amount of cholesterol in blood, which raises the chance of developing heart disease which is known as one of the leading causes of death in the U.S. In a recent study, it was found that 11 out of 25 restaurants failed after tests on the use of antibiotics as well. Antibiotic-resistant infections affect at least 2 million Americans each year, which will leave at least 23,000 of those people to die.

=== Consumer appeal ===
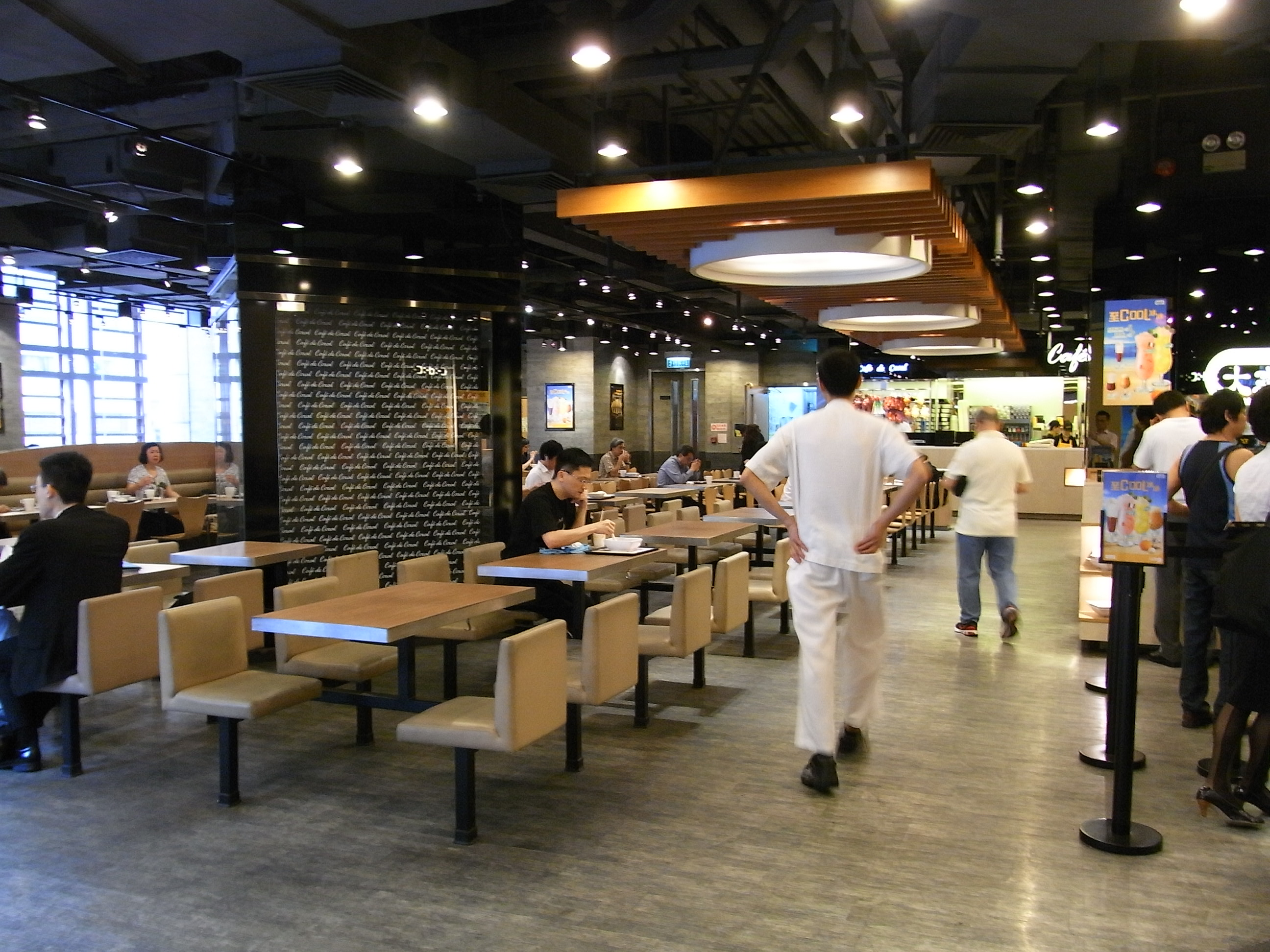
The interior of a fast-food restaurant in Sheung Wan, Hong Kong

Fast-food outlets have become popular with consumers for several reasons. One is that through economies of scale in purchasing and producing food, these companies can deliver food to consumers at a very low cost. In addition, although some people dislike fast food for its predictability, it can be reassuring to a hungry person in a hurry or far from home. At the same time, standardized service processes ensure a consistent experience across locations, which is attractive to consumers.

After World War II, fast-food chains like McDonald's rapidly gained a reputation in the United States for their cleanliness, fast service, and a child-friendly atmosphere where families on the road could purchase a quick meal. Prior to the rise of the fast-food chain restaurant, people generally had a choice between diners where the quality of the food was often questionable and service lacking, or high-end restaurants that were expensive and impractical for families with children. The modern, stream-lined convenience of the fast-food restaurant provided a new alternative and appealed to Americans' instinct for ideas and products associated with progress, technology, and innovation. Fast-food restaurants rapidly became the eatery "everyone could agree on", with many featuring child-size menu combos, play areas, and whimsical branding campaigns, like Ronald McDonald, designed to appeal to younger customers. Parents could have a few minutes of peace while children played or amused themselves with the toys included in their Happy Meal. There is a long history of fast-food advertising campaigns, many of which are directed at children.

Fast-food marketing largely focuses on children and teenagers. Popular methods of advertising include television, product placement in toys, games, educational materials, songs, and movies, character licensing and celebrity endorsements, and websites. Advertisements targeting children mainly focus on free toys, film tie-ins and other giveaways. Fast-food restaurants use kids' meals with toys, kid-friendly mascots, vibrant colors, and play areas to draw children toward their products. Children's power over their parents' purchases is estimated to total $300 to $500 billion every year. Fast food has become a part of American culture as a reward for children. To deny a child "desirable things" such as the advertised fast-food restaurant can cause stigmatization of parents as the "mean parent" when it is common among other parents to comply with their child's desires.

==== Child obesity ====
The major focus on children by the fast-food industry has created controversy due to the rising issue of child obesity in the United States. As a result of this focus, in 2008 a coalition was created and run by the Council of Better Business Bureaus called the Children's Food and Beverage Advertising Initiative (CFBAI), to stop ads aimed at children or to promote only what the council dubs "better-for-you" products in ads directed towards children. However, it was not until 2011 that the US Congress requested guidelines to be put in place by the CFBAI, FDA, Agriculture Department, and Centers for Disease Control. There are two basic requirements identified in the guidelines for foods that are advertised for children:

1. The food has to include healthy ingredients
2. The food must not contain unhealthy amounts of sugar, saturated fat, trans fat, and salt.

The guidelines are voluntary, but companies experience heavy pressure to comply. Once a company complies they have 5–10 years to comply with the guidelines. Many fast-food industries have started to comply with the guidelines, although many companies have a long way to go. In 2012 the fast-food industry spent $4.6 billion to advertise unhealthy products to children and teens, according to a report by the Yale Rudd Center for Food Policy & Obesity. There are points of progress that include healthier sides and beverages in most fast-food restaurant kids' meals. The guidelines promote a healthier lifestyle for children and address the growing problem of American obesity.

Fast food is on its way to healthier foods and menus. Some businesses have taken off and had success in this market with healthy foods and due to many health concerns and fast-food stereotypes, it is emerging as an expected thing. According to Jason Daley, healthful fast-food takeoff is explained by the fact that it has "ceased to be a thing-now, it's simply expected."

In other parts of the world, American and American-style fast-food outlets have been popular for their quality, customer service, and novelty, even though they are often the targets of popular anger towards American foreign policy or globalization more generally. Many consumers nonetheless see them as symbols of the wealth, progress, and well-ordered openness of Western society and they therefore become trendy attractions in many cities around the world, particularly among younger people with more varied tastes.

=== Impact of fast-food restaurant availability ===
Over time, fast-food restaurants have been growing rapidly, especially in urban neighborhoods. According to US research, low-income and predominantly African-American neighborhoods have greater exposure to fast-food outlets than higher income and predominantly white areas. This has put into question whether urbanized neighborhoods were targeted, which causes a more unhealthy group of people compared to people from a higher socioeconomic status. It has also been shown that there is a lower chance of finding a fast-food restaurant in a suburban neighborhood. In a study of selected US locations, Morland et al. (2002) found the number of fast-food restaurants and bars was inversely proportional to the wealth of the neighborhood, and that predominantly African-American residential areas were four times less likely to have a supermarket near them than predominantly white areas.

=== Innovations timeline ===
- 1872: Walter Scott of Providence, RI outfitted a horse-drawn lunch wagon with a simple kitchen, bringing hot dinners to workers
- 1916: Walter Anderson built the first White Castle in Wichita, KS in 1916, introducing the limited menu, high volume, low cost, high speed hamburger restaurant
- 1919: A&W Root Beer took its product out of the soda fountain and into a roadside stand
- 1921: A&W Root Beer began franchising its syrup
- 1930s: Howard Johnson's pioneered the concept of franchising restaurants, formally standardizing menus, signage, and advertising
- 1967: McDonald's opens its first restaurants outside the US.

=== Halal ===
The introduction of the halal option by some fast-food companies saw the expansion of fast-food chains into Muslim majority countries. This has resulted in a rise of restaurant options in non-western nations and has also increased revenue for some western restaurant chains. Some outlets offering Halal options include KFC, Nando's, Pizza Express, and Subway. McDonald's carried out a trial but decided that the cost of operations would be too high. There have also been court cases involving start-up businesses during attempts to alter the halal-certified method by machine killing, which is against the beliefs of some Muslims. However, the trend towards halal has been unpopular in some communities, which has at times resulted in internet petitions.

== Criticisms ==
The fast-food industry is a popular target for critics, from anti-globalization activists like José Bové to vegetarian activist groups such as PETA as well as the workers themselves. A number of fast-food worker strikes occurred in the United States in the 2010s.

In his best-selling 2001 book Fast Food Nation, investigative journalist Eric Schlosser leveled a broad, socioeconomic critique against the fast-food industry, documenting how fast food rose from small, family-run businesses (like the McDonald brothers' burger joint) into large, multinational corporate juggernauts whose economies of scale radically transformed agriculture, meat processing, and labor markets in the late twentieth century. Schlosser argues that while the innovations of the fast-food industry gave Americans more and cheaper dining options, it has come at the price of destroying the environment, economy, and small-town communities of rural America while shielding consumers from the real costs of their convenient meal, both in terms of health and the broader impact of large-scale food production and processing on workers, animals, and land.

The fast-food industry is popular in the United States, the source of most of its innovation, and many major international chains are based there. Seen as symbols of US dominance and perceived cultural imperialism, American fast-food franchises have often been the target of Anti-globalization protests and demonstrations against the US government. In 2005, for example, rioters in Karachi, Pakistan, who were initially angered because of the bombing of a Shiite mosque, destroyed a KFC restaurant.

== Legal issues ==
In August 2002, a group of overweight children in New York City filed a class-action lawsuit against McDonald's Corporation seeking compensation for obesity-related health problems, improved nutritional labeling of McDonald's products, and funding for a program to educate consumers about the dangers of fast food. This provoked an intense, mostly negative response in the media with columnists calling this case a "cartoon of a lawsuit".

This kind of litigation raises the important question of who, if anyone, ought to be held accountable for the economic and public health consequences of obesity.

In 2003, McDonald's was sued in a New York court by a family who claimed that the restaurant chain was responsible for their teenage daughter's obesity and attendant health problems. By manipulating food's taste, sugar and fat content, and directing their advertising to children, the suit argued that the company purposely misleads the public about the nutritional value of its product. A judge dismissed the case, but the fast-food industry disliked the publicity of its practices, particularly the way it targets children in its advertising. Although further lawsuits have not materialized, the issue is kept alive in the media and political circles by those promoting the need for tort reform.

In response to this, the "Cheeseburger Bill" was passed by the US House of Representatives in 2004; it later stalled in the US Senate. The law was reintroduced in 2005, only to meet the same fate. This law was claimed to "[ban] frivolous lawsuits against producers and sellers of food and non-alcoholic drinks arising from obesity claims." The bill arose because of an increase in lawsuits against fast-food chains by people who claimed that eating their products made them obese, disassociating themselves from any of the blame.

== See also ==
- Fast food advertising
- HACCP
- List of fast food restaurant chains
- List of hamburger restaurants
- List of the largest fast food restaurant chains
- Roadhouse (facility)
- Sanitation Standard Operating Procedures
- Fast casual restaurant
