= Chicken Republic =

Nigerian fast food chain

- Type: Subsidiary
- Industry: Food and beverage
- Founded: 2004; 22 years ago
- Headquarters: Lagos, Nigeria
- Number of locations: 300+
- Area served: Nigeria; Ghana
- Key people: Kofi Abunu (CEO)
- Products: Fried chicken, Rotisserie chicken, Jollof Rice, Spaghetti, Chicken Wraps, Burgers & Sandwiches
- Number of employees: 1,300+
- Parent: Food Concepts Plc
- Website: chicken-republic.com

Chicken Republic is a Nigerian quick-service restaurant (QSR) chain specializing in chicken-based meals and other fast-food products. Founded in 2004, the chain is a subsidiary and flagship brand of Food Concepts Plc, a Nigerian food-service company headquartered in Lagos. Its restaurants operate primarily in Nigeria, with a presence in Ghana, and the brand also operates through franchising.

== History ==
=== Founding ===
Chicken Republic was founded by Nigerian entrepreneur Deji Akinyanju, who returned to Nigeria after roughly 16 years working in the United Kingdom, including time at Accenture (then Andersen Consulting) in London. Akinyanju has described his decision to return home as driven by a wish to contribute to Nigeria's private sector during its transition from military rule to democracy.

Food Concepts, the parent company, was originally incorporated in December 1999 as Food Concepts & Entertainment Limited. In its early years it operated as a franchisee for South African quick-service restaurant brands before developing its own proprietary chains. The first Chicken Republic restaurant opened in Apapa, Lagos, in 2004, initially drawing on a franchise relationship with the South African chain Chicken Licken before Akinyanju established Chicken Republic as an independent, wholly Nigerian-owned brand.

Akinyanju also built out a wider group of food and hospitality brands during this period, including Butterfield Bakery (2003, a South African-linked brand that grew into one of Nigeria's largest bakery chains), and separate franchise interests such as Reeds Thai Restaurant and St. Elmo's Pizza.

=== Early Growth and Financing ===
The early growth of the business was funded initially by roughly $2 million in seed capital raised from family and friends. As the chain expanded, the company took on debt to finance new outlets, which created cash-flow pressure in its early years. In 2008, the company raised an additional $30 million to support further expansion. Food Concepts also entered into a financing arrangement with the International Finance Corporation (IFC), reported at around $20 million, intended to strengthen corporate governance and food-safety standards and to support entry into the Ghanaian market.

Akinyanju additionally diversified into poultry supply through a chicken-farming venture named Ganic, located outside Lagos, aimed at securing a more reliable supply chain for the restaurant business.

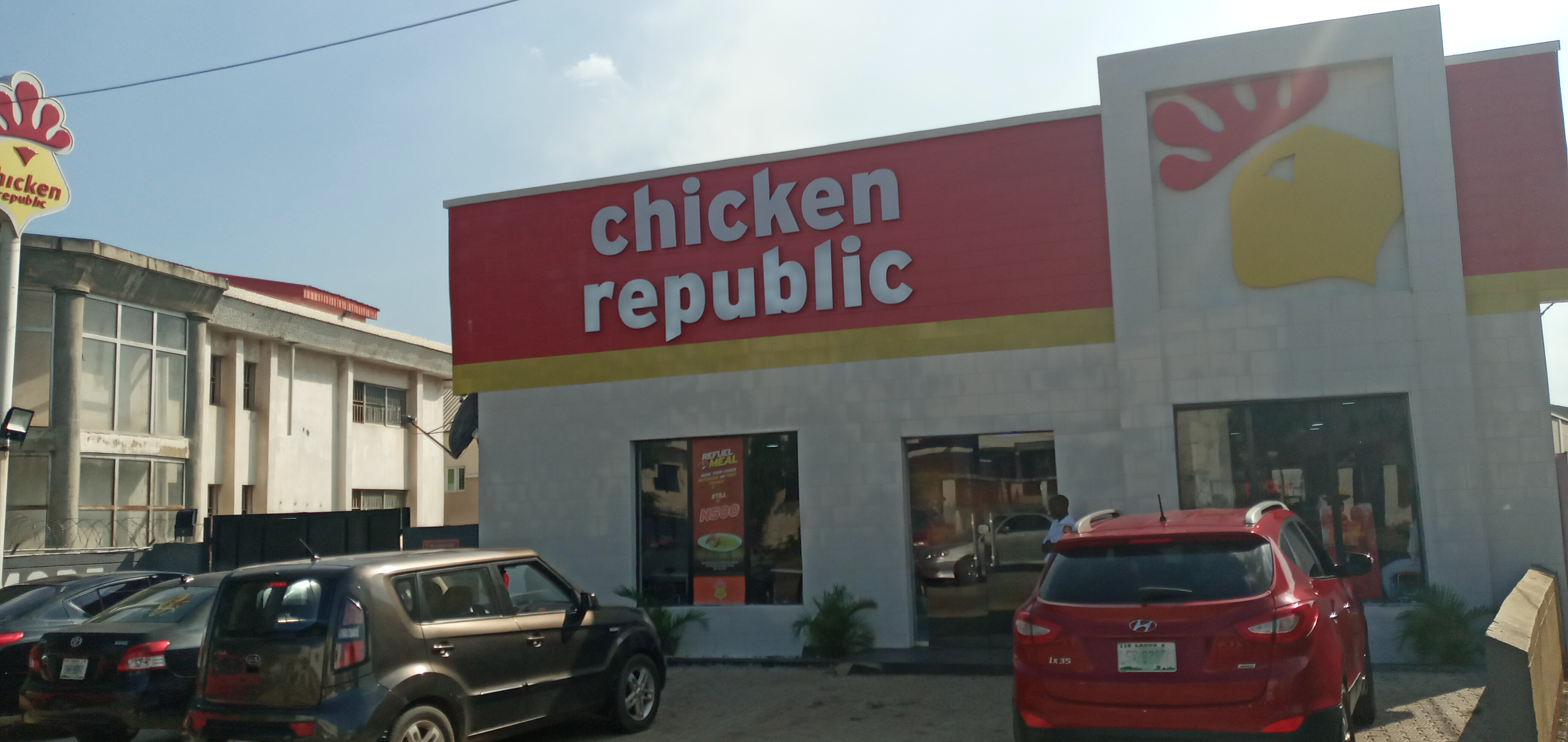
Chicken Republic Restaurant in Abuja

=== Corporate Conversion and Restructuring ===
On 10 May 2009, Food Concepts converted by special resolution from a private limited liability company to a public limited liability company, adopting the name Food Concepts Plc. Over time, the company divested from some of its franchised South African brands and consolidated around a smaller set of proprietary brands it owns outright: Chicken Republic, PieXpress, and The Chop Box (having also previously operated Butterfield and Yum Yum).

=== Ownership Changes ===
Food Concepts Plc's shares have traded on Nigeria's NASD OTC Securities Exchange, an over-the-counter market for public companies not listed on the main Nigerian Exchange (NGX). Ownership has been shaped substantially by private equity:

- Development Partners International (DPI), a pan-African private equity firm, became a majority shareholder in Food Concepts.
- In 2021, DPI sold a 31% stake in Food Concepts to Africa Capital Alliance (ACA), another pan-African investment firm, while DPI retained majority ownership. The two firms stated the deal was intended to support Food Concepts' regional expansion strategy.

=== Leadership Changes ===
Kofi Abunu became Managing Director/CEO of Food Concepts Plc in March 2022. Abunu previously held international management roles at McDonald's (UK), Nando's, Steers (Ghana), and Innscor West Africa, and had joined Food Concepts as a General Manager for the Chicken Republic brand as early as 2007.

=== Growth and Store Count ===
Chicken Republic's footprint has grown substantially since its 2004 launch:

- By the early 2010s, the chain had grown to roughly 70 outlets.
- By around 2016–2021, various reports place the store count between approximately 150 and 180 locations across Nigeria and Ghana.
- By 2023, Food Concepts reported roughly 299 stores across 25 Nigerian states, plus operations in Ghana.
- More recent tallies (2025 - 2026) cite figures in the range of 170 - 190+ company/franchise locations, though exact totals vary by source and reporting period, and the company has periodically slowed new-store rollout amid macroeconomic pressure - Food Concepts indicated plans to open only a handful of new outlets in 2024 given cost pressures from inflation.

The brand operates primarily in Nigeria (its core market, with stores across most major cities including Lagos, Abuja, and Port Harcourt) and Ghana. Reporting on the brand's history has also referenced past ambitions to expand more broadly across West Africa.
