= Albaik =

Saudi fast-food restaurant chain

Albaik Food Systems Company
- Logo since 2025
- Type: Private
- Industry: Restaurant
- Genre: Fast food restaurant
- Founded: 1974; 52 years ago
- Founder: Shakour Abu Ghazalah
- Headquarters: Jeddah, Saudi Arabia
- Number of locations: 201 (2026)
- Area served: Saudi Arabia, UAE, Bahrain, Kuwait; Planned: Pakistan, Bangladesh, Turkey, Afghanistan, India, Kyrgyzstan, Indonesia, Qatar, (Note: mobile locations opened during the 2022 FIFA World Cup) Malaysia, Europe, North America, Oceania, Maldives, Egypt
- Key people: Ihsan Abu Ghazalah; (Chairman); Rami Abu Ghazalah; (CEO)
- Products: Broasted Chicken; Seafood; French Fries; Sandwiches; Soft Drinks; Desserts
- Revenue: 20 billion SAR (2024)
- Parent: AlBaik Food Systems Company S.A.
- Website: www.albaik.com

Albaik Food Systems Company, doing business as Albaik (Arabic: البيك) is a Saudi fast food restaurant chain headquartered in Jeddah, Saudi Arabia that primarily sells broasted chicken with a variety of sauces. It is the largest restaurant chain in Saudi Arabia. Albaik currently has a trade name in 80 countries.

The chain was founded by Shakour Abu Ghazalah, a Palestinian-Saudi entrepreneur, who originally came to Saudi Arabia as a refugee from the Nakba, and he began selling broasted chicken in 1974. The restaurant was located on Old Airport Road in Jeddah. Albaik was registered as a trademark in Saudi Arabia in 1986.

== History ==
The first Albaik restaurant was opened in Mecca in 1990. Albaik then began expansion by building three seasonal locations in Mina in 1998 and served pilgrims during Hajj. The company expanded to Medina in 2001. They introduced a limited menu food court concept named Albaik Express in 2002 in Diyafa Mall in Mecca. They opened the world's largest quick-service restaurant kitchen in Mina as a seasonal restaurant to serve pilgrims during Hajj in 2006. The same year, they opened a location in Yanbu City. In 2013, they opened their first express restaurant at a Sasco Petrol station on the highway road from Medina to Jeddah.

Their first restaurant out of Hejaz was in Buraydah, Qaseem in 2015, expanding their customer's range. They opened their first branches in Jizan and Riyadh in the year 2016 and 2018 respectively. In 2019, they opened three branches in Dammam, Eastern Province, with the main one located in King Fahd International Airport and the other two in the Abdullah Fuad and Al Manar districts.

In December 2020, the company expanded internationally by opening its first branches in the Kingdom of Bahrain. The initial locations were launched at Sultan Mall in Zayed Town and at Bahrain International Airport. This marked the brand’s first expansion outside Saudi Arabia and its entry into the Gulf market beyond the Kingdom.

On June 16, 2021, Albaik opened its first branch in The Dubai Mall, bringing its range of dishes to the United Arab Emirates for the first time. They have since opened three more branches in the UAE, with another currently under construction. They also opened a branch in Kuwait, in the Avenues Mall on January 24, 2025.

A 30,000 m^{2} (320,000 sq ft) food processing company was inaugurated for Aquat Food Industries - a sister company of Albaik and the main producer and supplier of its menu in 2000, effectively boosting their sales.

== Programs ==
In 1996, the Young Scientist program was introduced as part of Albaik and Coca-Cola's corporate social responsibility commitment towards society in association with the Jeddah Science and Technology Center. The House Hero children's education and training program were firstly introduced in 2001. In 2005, "Nazeeh & Wartan" - the Clean Up the World program for Saudi Arabia was introduced with Coca-Cola, in association with the United Nations Development Programme and Jeddah Science and Technology Center. The rate is around 12 riyals.

== Products ==
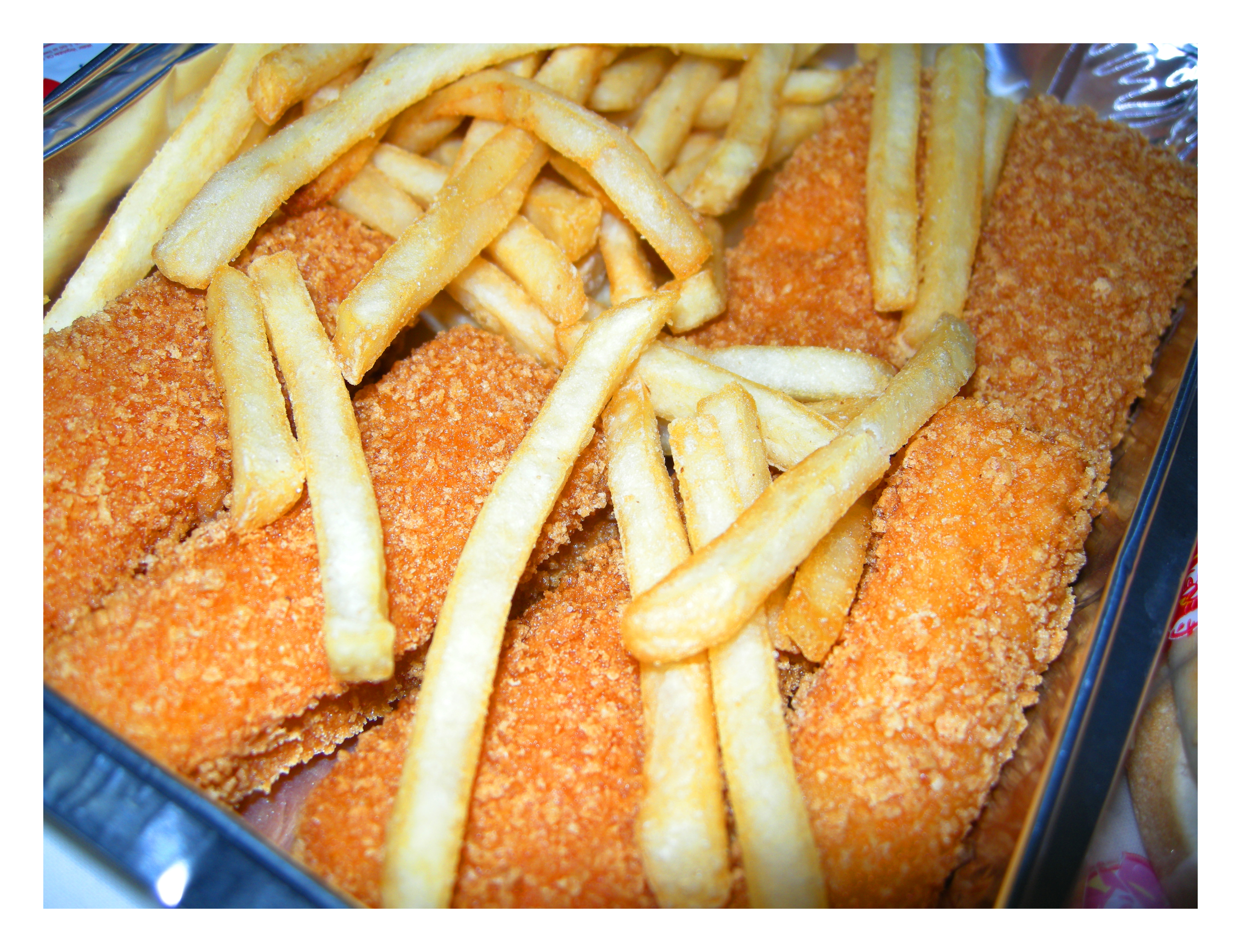
A fish fillet meal at Albaik

The 18 secret herbs and spices recipe was first developed in 1984. Variations of the Albaik chicken was first sold in 1994, with the addition of Harrag, a spicy variation of Albaik's chicken. Seafood was first included on the menu with the introduction of the jumbo shrimp in 1995 and the value shrimp in the following year.

== Locations ==
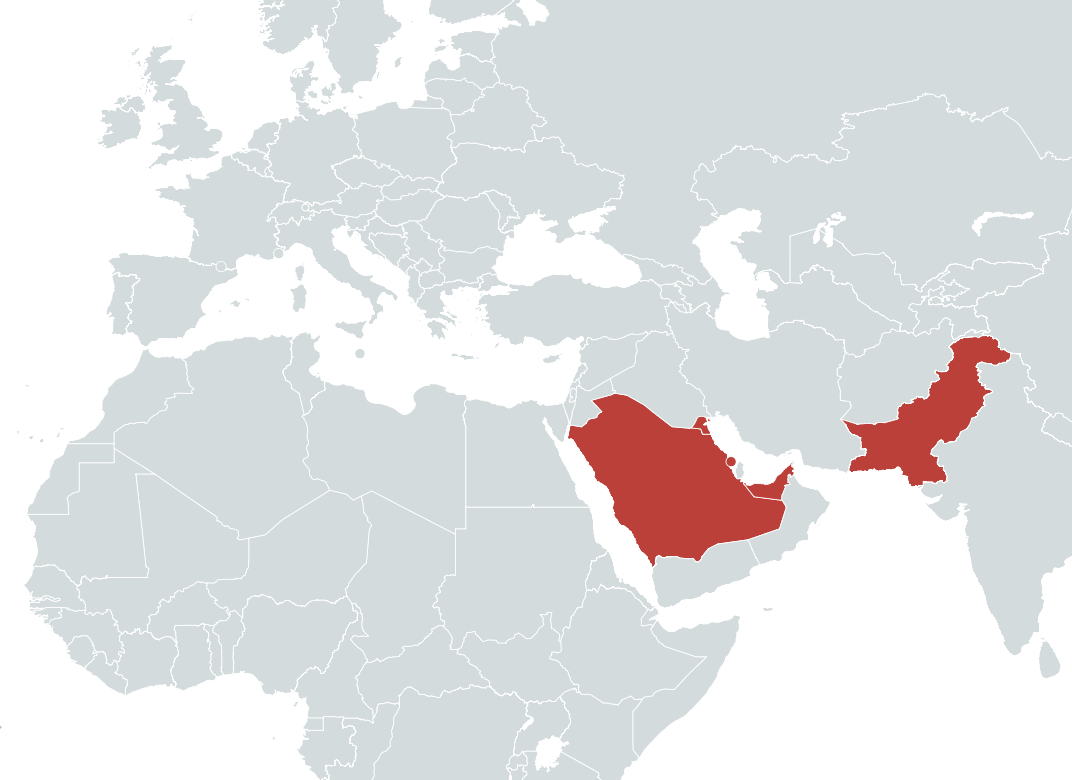
Distribution of Al-Baik restaurants around the world

Albaik has more than 40 branches in Jeddah where it is headquartered: ten in Mecca, eight in Medina, three in Buraydah, one in Unaizah, one in Taif, one in Yanbu, twenty in Riyadh, one in Al Qunfudhah, one in Al Lith, Al-Kharj and one in Al-Jubail.

Recently, Albaik started expanding further into the central region of Saudi Arabia with two branches opened in Buraidah, and one in Abha and further branches planned for the city, in addition to other main cities in the region. This marked the first time the chain has expanded outside its main service area in Saudi Arabia's western provinces. Albaik was also introduced in Saudi Arabia's South Province, in the city of Jizan in 2016. As of 2019, Albaik is constructing its new branch in Al-Baha and currently has over 120 locations.

In December 2020, Albaik opened two branches in Bahrain, marking the first time the chain expanded outside of Saudi Arabia. Albaik entered the Emirati market in 2021 and, by May 2025, had established 23 branches. in 2022, Albaik temporarily operated in Qatar during the 2022 FIFA World Cup. Then, in 2025, Albaik debuted in Kuwait at The Avenues Mall. In 2024, Albaik has announced plans to open in Pakistan, extending its reach outside the Arabian Peninsula, with locations in Karachi, Lahore and Islamabad. The first restaurant will be opened in Pakistan in 2026.

Country/Territory	Date of first store	No. of operating outlets
Saudi Arabia	1974	153
Bahrain	2020	4
United Arab Emirates	2021	23
Kuwait	2025	1

== See also ==
- List of fast-food chicken restaurants
