= Teremok =

Russian fast food chain

- Company type: Private
- Industry: Fast food restaurant
- Founded: 1998 in Moscow, Russia
- Founder: Mikhail Goncharov
- Headquarters: Moscow, Russia
- Number of locations: ~300 (2017)
- Areas served: Moscow; Saint Petersburg; Ural; Southern Russia; Siberia
- Key people: Mikhail Goncharov (CEO) Andrey Narkevich (COO)
- Revenue: $135,000,000 (2017)

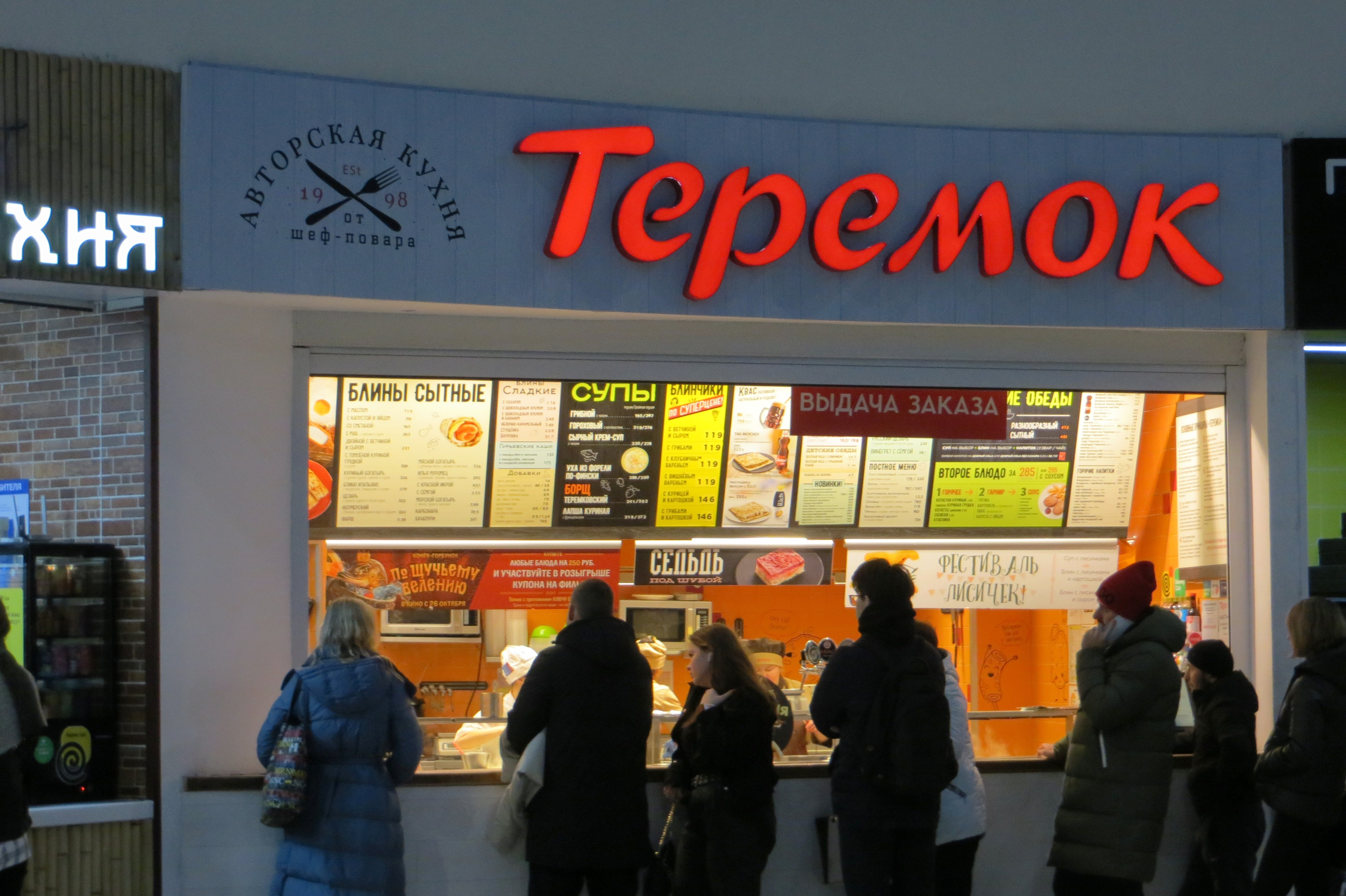
Teremok in Moscow near Bratislavskaya metro station

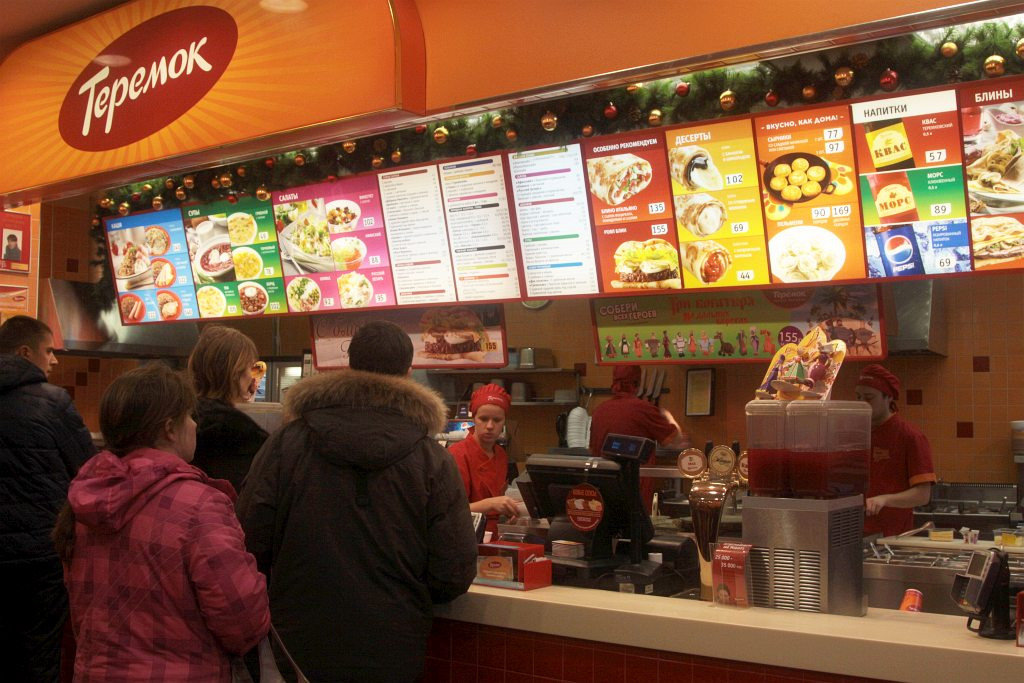
Inside a Teremok restaurant in Saint Petersburg.

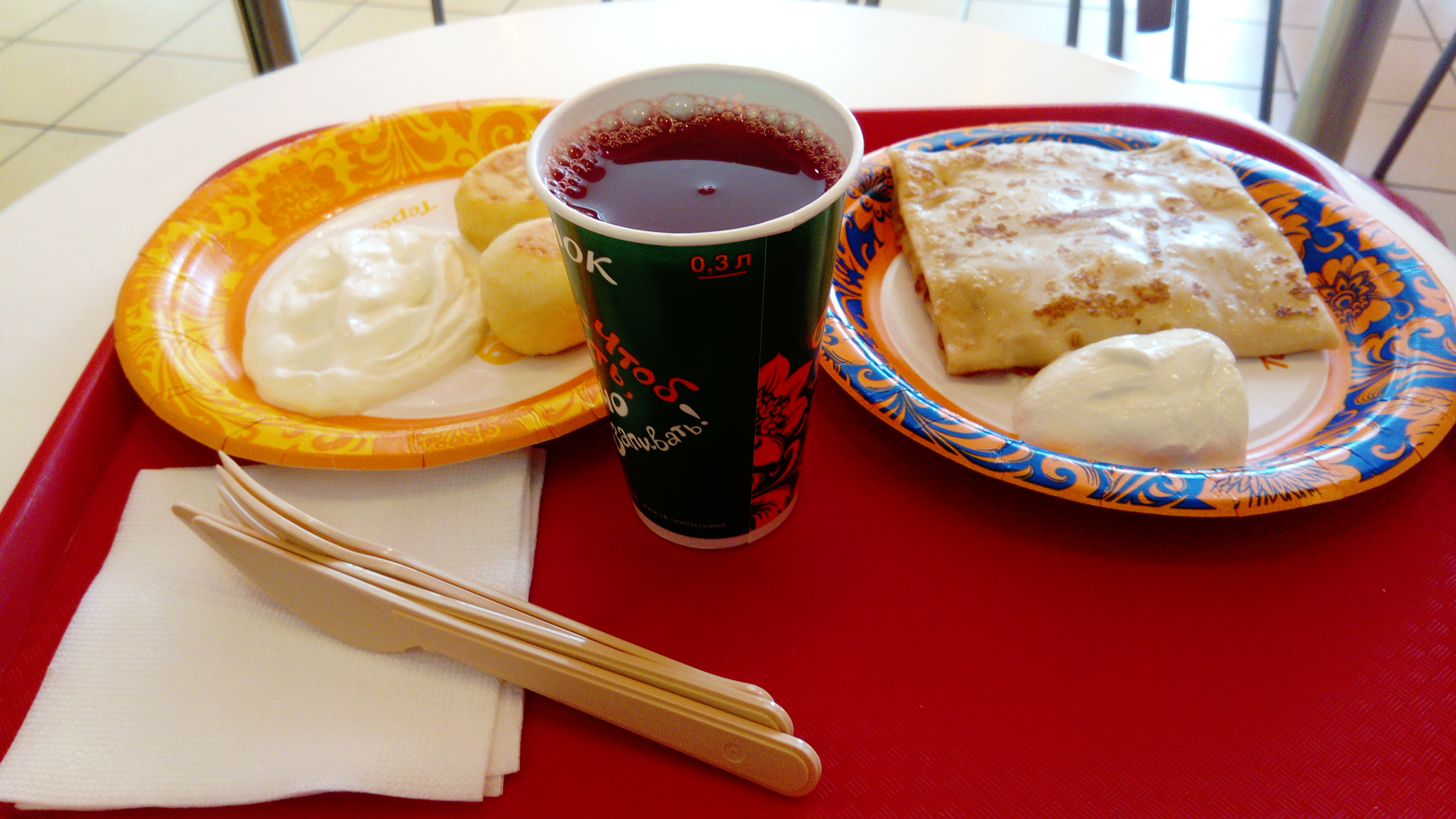
Mors and blini

Teremok (Russian: Теремок) is a Russian fast food chain that primarily specialises in traditional Russian dishes such as blini, pelmeni, and kvass and borscht. Founded in 1998 by Mikhail Goncharov, their menu was adapted from the recipes of Goncharov's mother.

Their restaurants operate in Moscow, Saint Petersburg, Ural, Southern Russia and Siberia. As of 2017 it has grown to 300 restaurants, which formerly included two in New York City that closed in 2018.

== History ==
The first Teremok opened in 1998 in a street kiosk in Moscow. It offered a limited set of blinis, and it was one of the first fast food chains in Russia that were offering Russian food, trying to compete with McDonald's. There are currently three types of Teremok outlets: restaurants, street kiosks, and food court outlets in shopping malls, metro stations or airports.

The chain opened two branches in Union Square and Chelsea in New York City in 2017, their first ventures outside of Russia. In an interview with a Russian magazine, Goncharov said his reason for expanding to America was because "it’s the motherland of fast food." In June 2018, Goncharov announced it was closing his two restaurants in the States, accusing New York City inspectors of "open hostility" towards his restaurants and staff.

== Concept ==
The official concept of Teremok is to offer traditional cuisine as fast food but to be at the same time more natural and healthy. Teremok specializes in Russian-style home cooking with recipes developed by the mother of Goncharov. Menu items include blini (thin crepe-like pancakes), borscht (beet soup with cabbage), and kasha (a buckwheat dish served with meat, fish or mushrooms). They also experiment with unusual and outlandish dishes.
