= Bageterie Boulevard =

Czech fast food chain

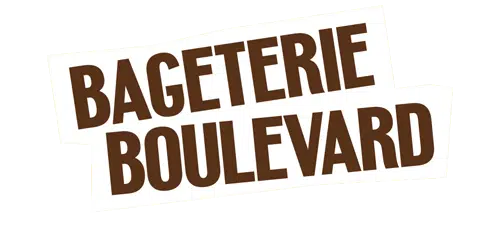

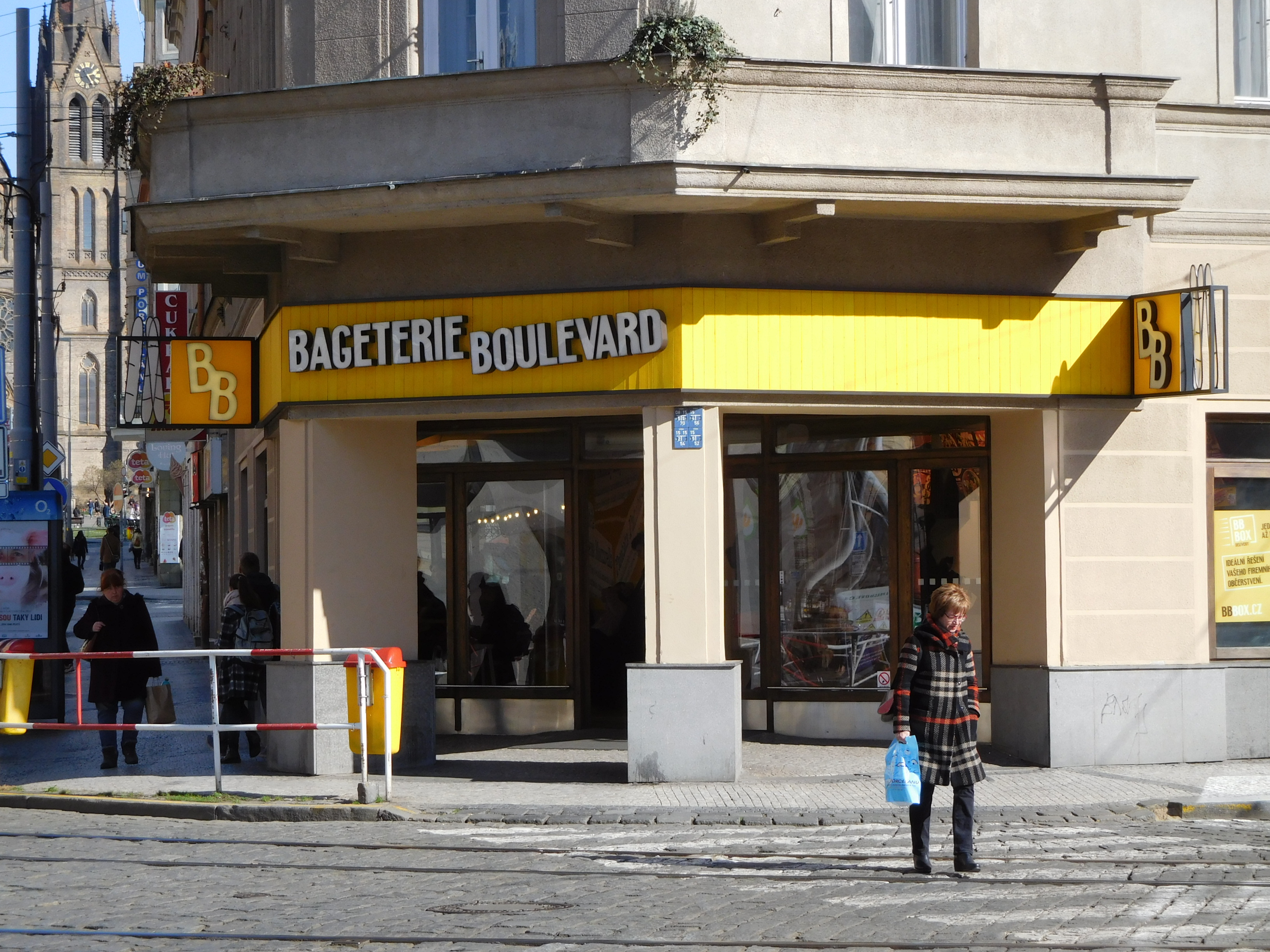
- Bageterie Boulevard in Prague
- Industry: Fast food restaurants
- Founded: 8 March 2003
- Headquarters: Prague, Czech Republic
- Number of locations: 74 (2026)
- Area served: Austria, Czech Republic, Slovakia
- Products: baguettes; salads; french fries; soft drinks; soups
- Website: www.bageterie.com

Bageterie Boulevard (/bɑːɡɛtɛrɪɛˈbuːləvɑːd/), is a Czech fast food restaurant chain, headquartered in Prague. The first establishment was opened in 2003 in Dejvice. As of 2023, restaurants in Austria, the Czech Republic and Slovakia operate under the brand. Bageterie Boulevard offers various baguettes, salads, soups and more. Branches are located near office buildings and campuses, or in shopping malls. The brand belongs to the company Crocodille, a Czech company specializing in the production and sale of packaged baguettes and sandwiches, founded in 1991. Bageterie Boulevard has 74 restaurants as of 2026.

== Branches by countries ==
Country	Years	Number of establishments	Notes
Austria	2026–	1	
Czech Republic	2003–	72	Company home country. It has been operating in the Czech Republic since the concept was established in 2003.
Slovakia	2012–	2	The first branch outside the Czech Republic, opened in 2012 in Bratislava. In 2015 opened second, also in Bratislava.
