= HokBen =

Indonesian fast food chain

PT Eka Bogainti
- Trade name: HokBen
- Type: Private
- Industry: Foodservice
- Founded: 18 April 1985; 41 years ago
- Headquarters: Jakarta, Indonesia
- Key people: Paulus Arifin (CEO)
- Products: Japanese-style fast food
- Website: Official website

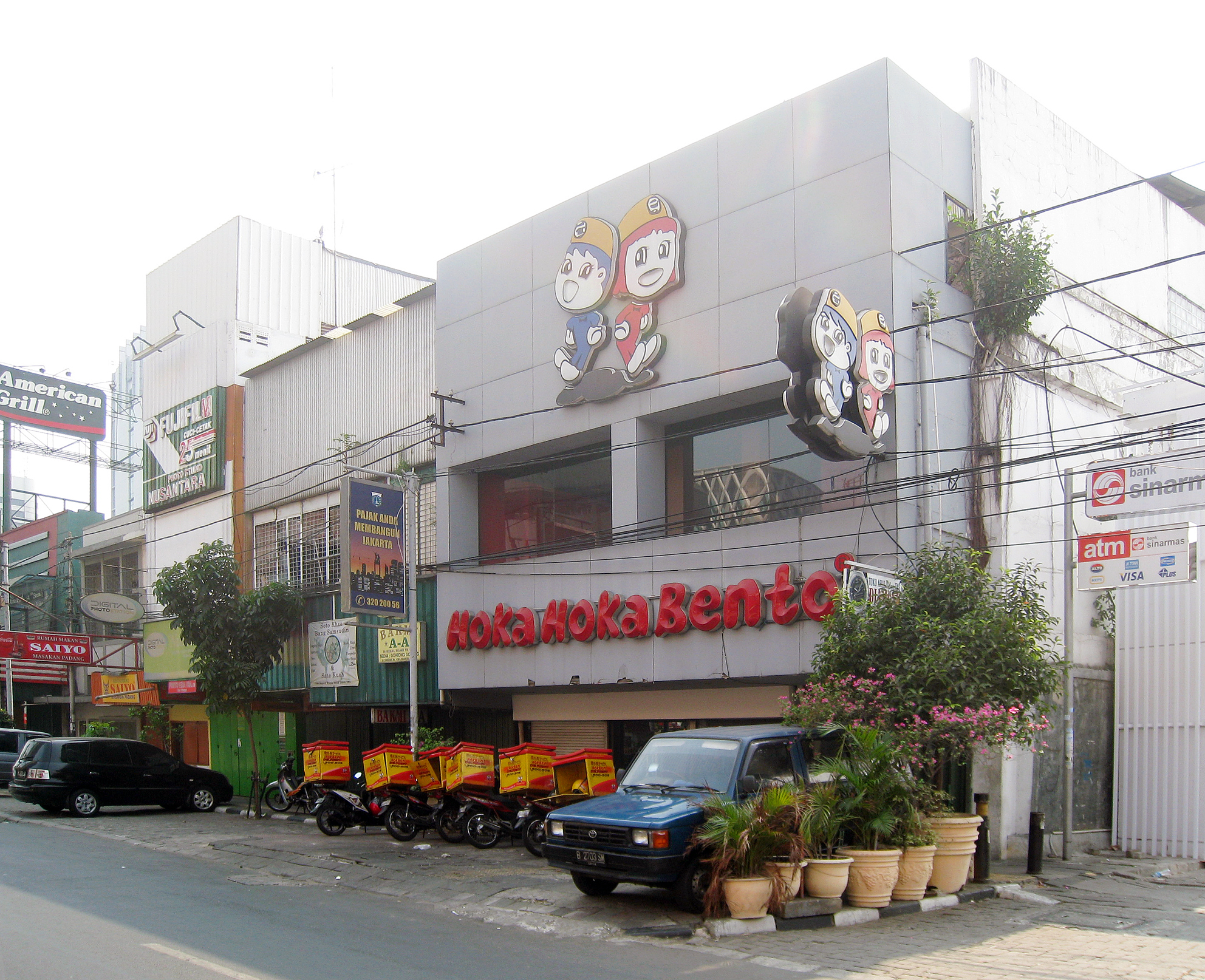
HokBen outlet on Jalan Sabang, Jakarta with the old Hoka Hoka Bento logo

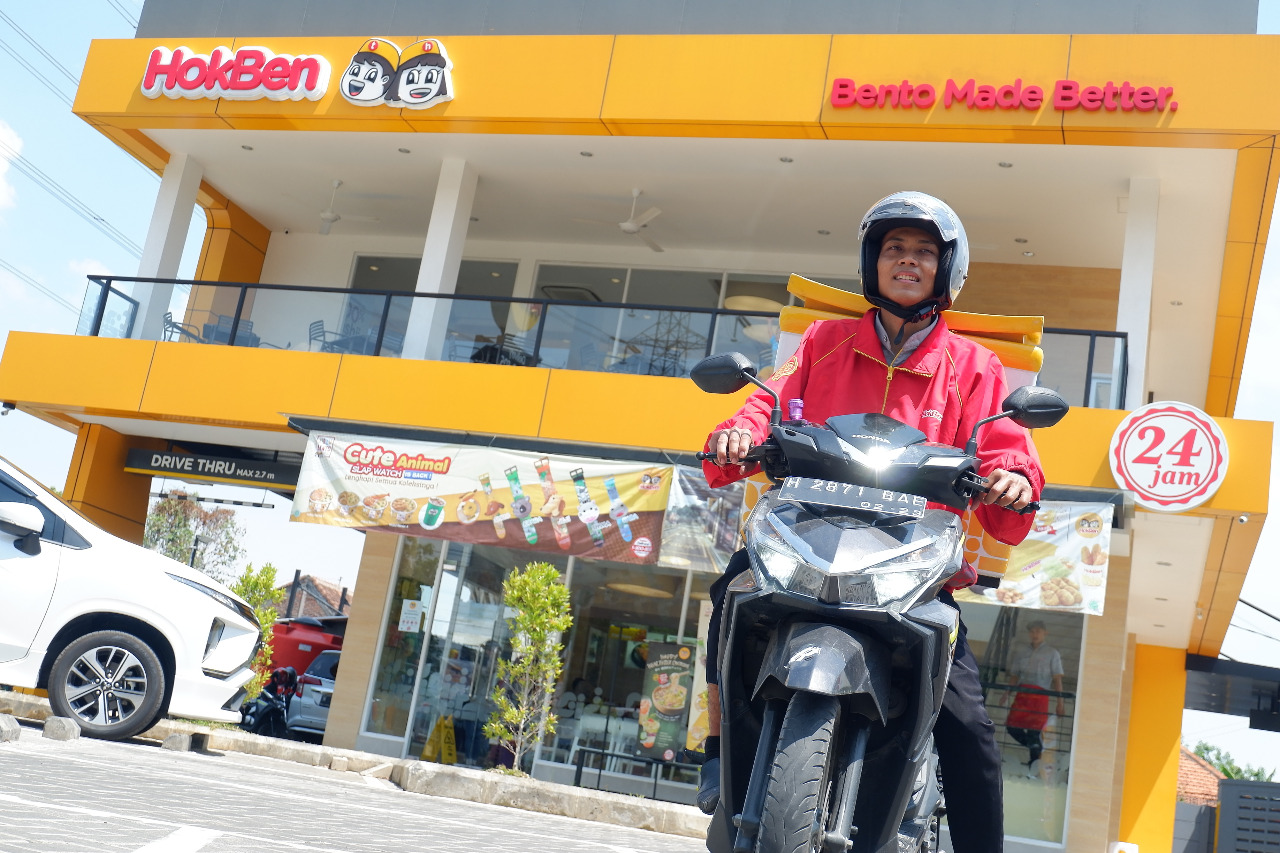
HokBen Majapahit Semarang 2, with the new HokBen logo

PT Eka Bogainti, trading as HokBen (formerly known as Hoka Hoka Bento), is an Indonesian chain of restaurants that serves mainly Japanese-style fast food. Headquartered in the Jakarta capital region, the chain of restaurants span nationwide across the Indonesian islands of Java, Bali, Kalimantan, Sulawesi, and Sumatra.

== History ==
Established on 18 April 1985 in Kebon Kacang, Jakarta, under PT. Eka Bogainti by Hendra Arifin, HokBen became the largest Japanese-style fast food chain in Indonesia. Although they serve Japanese-style fast food, the ownership, management and cooks are entirely Indonesian. There is no Japanese involvement in the business.

In April 2008, the firm had 98 outlets. In April 2010, there were around 120 outlets, with expansion planned to other Indonesian cities in Central Java, Yogyakarta and Bali., As of 2025, HokBen has 387 restaurant chains in all of Indonesia.

In 2018 the first outlet opened in Sumatra, in the city of Bandar Lampung. In 2022, the first outlet opened in Kalimantan, in the city of Pontianak. And in 2023, the first outlet opened in Sulawesi, in the city of Makassar.

== Products ==
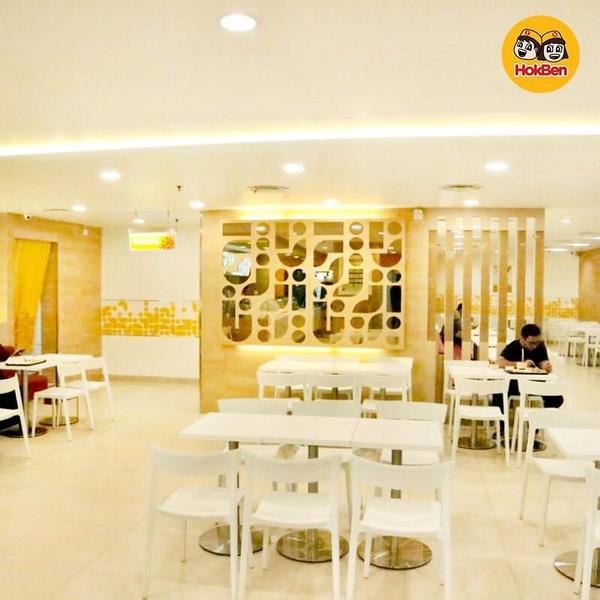
Restaurant interior

HokBen serves various Japanese fast food. However, unlike the common ordering and serving method in most fast food restaurants, HokBen's serving arrangement is set similar to a high school cafeteria where customers move along the line with a tray to collect their dishes. Their menu comprises both set meals and à la carte dishes. Although they define themselves as a Japanese restaurant, most of the food served have been adapted to suit Indonesians' taste. Examples of the change include stronger flavor compared to authentic Japanese food as well as the addition of sambal to cater to Indonesians' preference for spicy food.

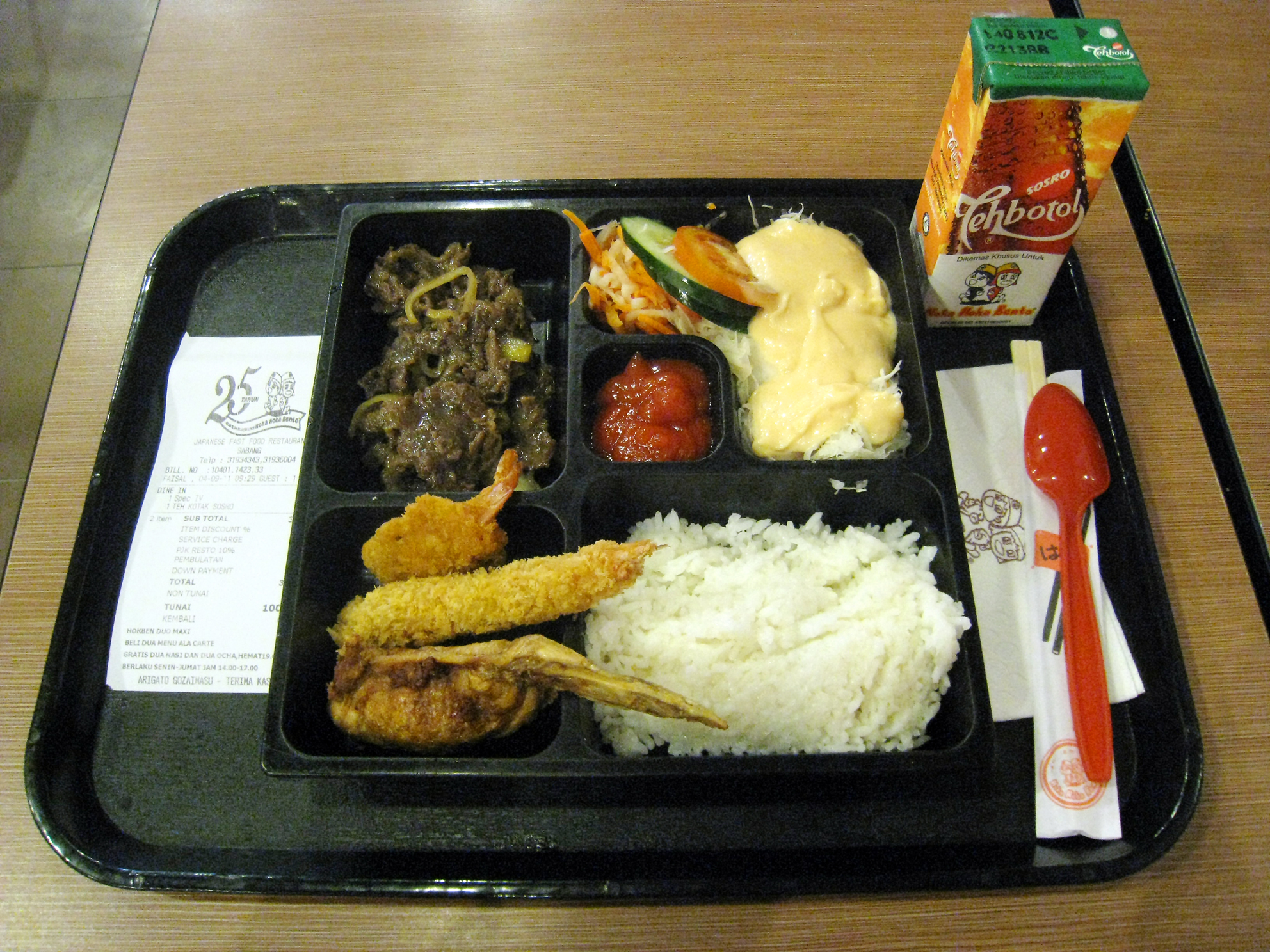
HokBen set meal

HokBen offers a kids' meal package called "Kidzu Bento" which includes toys. They are also able to accommodate for children's birthday parties in their restaurants. The logo and toys offered are based on Hoka Hoka Bento characters.

HokBen operates five outlet concepts: HokBen Plus, stand-alone stores, mall-based outlets, shop-house (ruko) locations, and HokBen Kitchen. HokBen Kitchen, established during the COVID-19 pandemic to cater to online delivery and takeaway orders, now has 90 outlets.
