= Restaurant order wheel =

Equipment used to track customer orders

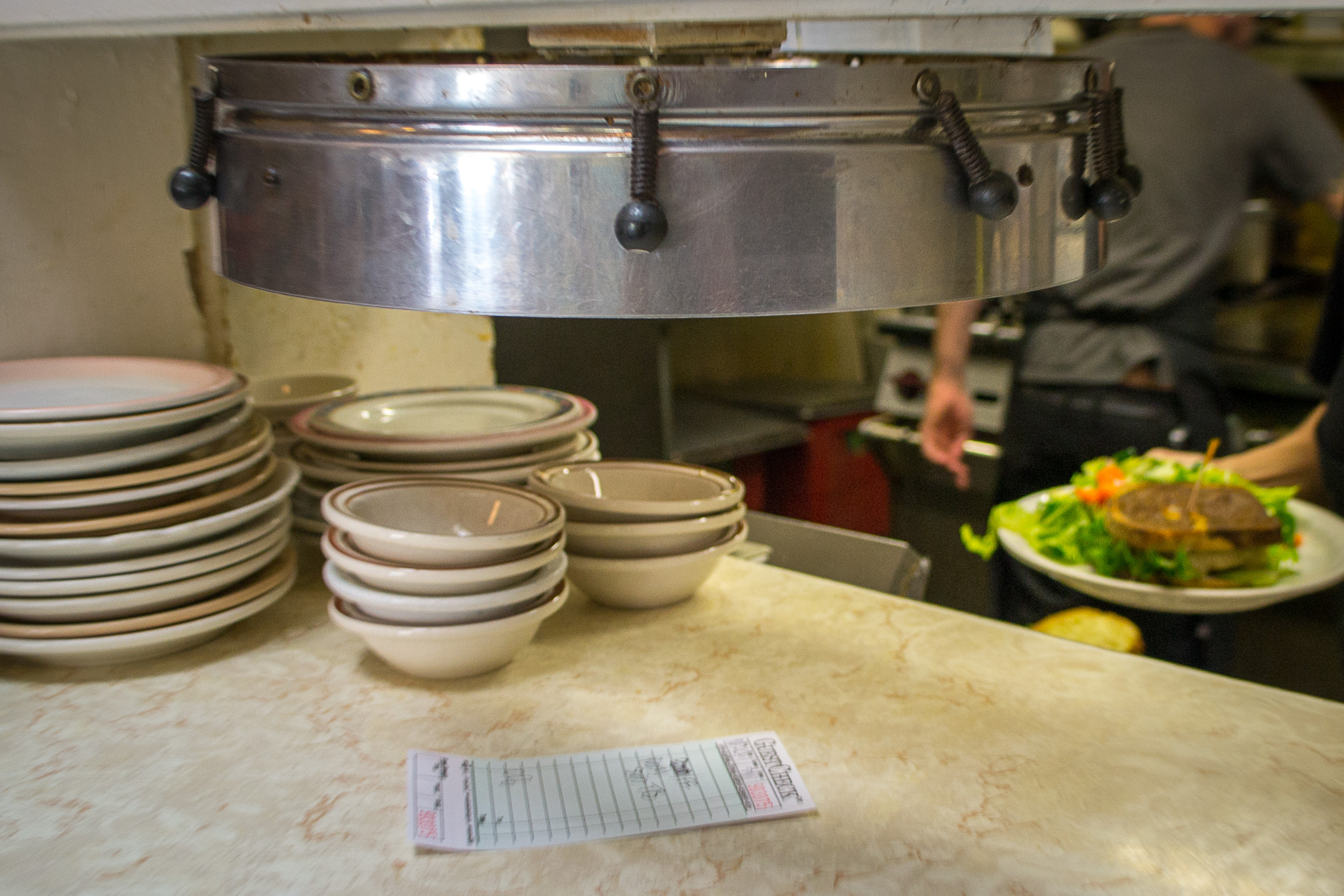
An order wheel

In a restaurant an order wheel is a piece of equipment used to track customer orders ("tickets"). It is used to facilitate a process whereby a new order ("ticket") is clipped onto a wheel which is then turned clockwise from the server or "waitress" side of the restaurant around to the kitchen or "cook" side. Orders are made in sequence and turned further back around to the server as completed.

In the 1940s, sociologist William Foote Whyte recommended the equipment as a way to improve communication and reduce conflict between wait and kitchen staff.

This process has continued into the electronic age where the mechanical wheel is no longer a physical device, but an order is still sent to the kitchen and then returned to the server once completed via a sequential process of first in - first out.

When certain orders take longer to cook, (i.e. well done steak) the ticket can be pulled from the wheel and re-inserted when completed.

The term "working the wheel" is a reference to the cook responsible for coordinating what to start cooking first and timing all food finishing at the same time.
