= Goto (disambiguation) =

goto is a statement found in many computer programming languages.

Goto may also refer to:

== Places ==
- Gotō, Nagasaki, a city in Japan
- Gotō Islands, Japanese islands in the East China Sea

== People ==
- Gotō (surname), a Japanese surname, including a list of people with the name
- Kazushige Goto, a software engineer who developed the highly optimized GotoBLAS linear algebra library

== Arts, entertainment, and media ==
- G0-T0, a droid in the video game Star Wars: Knights of the Old Republic II – The Sith Lords
- Goto Dengo, a character in Neal Stephenson's 1999 novel Cryptonomicon
- The Goto Family, a powerful Yakuza family from The Raid 2
  - Hideaki Goto, Yakuza boss and head of Goto Family
  - Keiichi Goto, son of Hideaki Goto and heir of Goto Family

== Organizations ==
- GoTo.com, later Overture Services, Inc., a pay-for-placement Internet search service acquired by Yahoo!
- Goto-gumi, a Japanese yakuza organization
- GoTo (Indonesian company), an Indonesian holding company which is the parent company of Gojek and Tokopedia
- GoTo (US company), an American software company based in Boston, Massachusetts. Formerly known as LogMeIn, Inc.
- GoTo Foods, formerly known FOCUS Brands, is an American company that owns the Schlotzsky's, Carvel, Cinnabon, Moe's Southwest Grill, McAlister's Deli, Auntie Anne's and Jamba restaurant brands.

== Science and technology ==
- GoTo (telescopes), a type of telescope mount and related software
- The Gravitational-wave Optical Transient Observer, a global array of robotic telescopes

== Other uses ==
- Goto (food), a kind of Philippine rice congee
- ~Go To~, an alternative name for the 2019 Bring Me the Horizon album Music to Listen To...

== See also ==
- Go (disambiguation)
