= Huberman =

Huberman is a surname. Notable people with the surname include:

- Yitzchak Huberman (1896 – 1977) Hasidic rabbi
- Amy Huberman (born 1979), Irish actress
- Andrew D. Huberman (born 1975), American neuroscientist and podcaster
- Bernardo Huberman (fl. after 1966), American computer scientist
- Bronisław Huberman (1882–1947), Polish violinist
- Leo Huberman (1903–1968), American writer
- Mark Huberman (born 1981), Irish actor
- Ron Huberman (born 1971), American administrator
- Meir Dagan (born Meir Huberman 1945-2016), Israeli former Mossad chief
- Barbara Liskov (born Barbara Huberman 1939), American computer scientist
- Harold Huber (born Harold Huberman 1909-1959), American actor
- Benjamin Huberman (born 1938), American advisor
- Georges Didi-Huberman (born 1953), French philosopher
