= Kat Cole =

American businesswoman (born 1978)

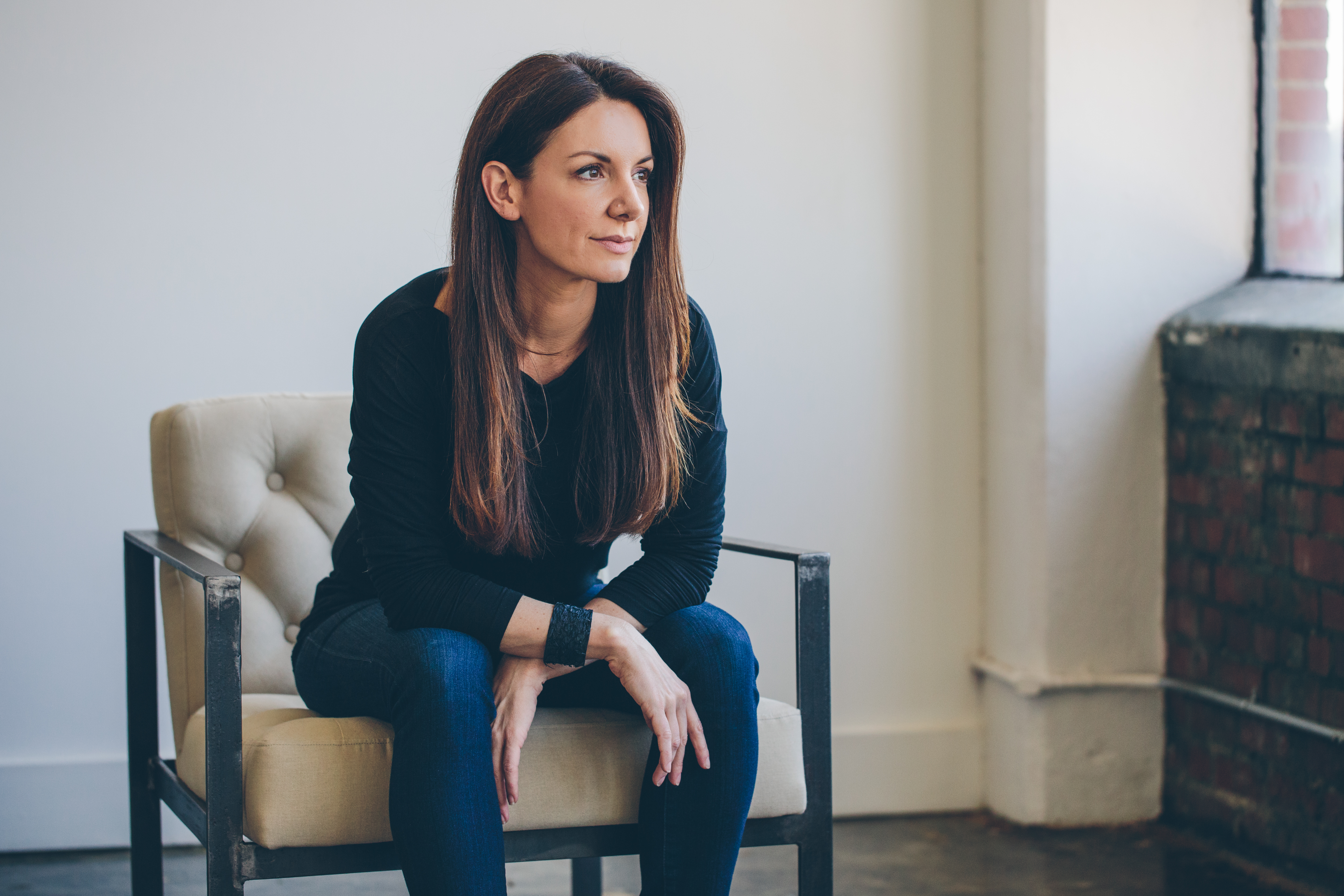
- Born: March 18, 1978 (age 48); Jacksonville, Florida, U.S
- Education: Georgia State University
- Occupations: CEO, AG1

Katrina "Kat" Cole (born March 18, 1978) is an American businesswoman. She is the CEO of AG1, formerly known as Athletic Greens. She was previously the chief operating officer and president of North America for Focus Brands and the president of Focus Brands' subsidiary Cinnabon, an American chain of retail bakeries specializing in cinnamon buns. Earlier in her career, she was the executive vice president of Hooters.

== Early life ==
Cole was born the eldest of three sisters in Jacksonville, Florida, and raised in Orange Park, Florida. Her mother divorced her father (a Vietnam War veteran) when Cole was nine years old, and raised the three girls as a single mother.

== Education ==
Cole received her MBA in 2010 from Georgia State University. She had dropped out of her undergraduate engineering program at the University of North Florida to focus on her global career at Hooters, so she had to take the GMAT and extra interviews to apply. She was only allowed to attend the Georgia State MBA program since they are one of the few schools that allow experienced students who did not receive a bachelor's degree to apply. She also asked ten CEOs, including Ted Turner, for letters of recommendation to the business school program.

== Early career ==
Following her mother's divorce, Cole began working to help pay some of the family expenses. Cole worked at The Body Shop before starting her career at Hooters as a hostess.

During her first year waitressing at Hooters, Cole covered varied positions from manager to cook, nearly every position at the restaurant. Upon her manager's recommendation as the Jacksonville franchise's best employee, Cole was sent to Sydney to train and motivate the new owners and employees at the opening of the first Hooters in Australia. She continued to travel overseas to train employees in Hooters Restaurants abroad.

She became a vice president at age 26. As the vice president of training and development, Cole oversaw the growth of Hooters, from approximately 100 locations and $300 million in revenue to 500 locations in 33 countries and $1 billion in revenue.

== Tenure at Cinnabon ==
In November 2010, Cole was hired by Cinnabon Inc., and was named president in January 2011. During the first three years of her tenure, Cinnabon added 200 bakeries, created partnerships with grocery stores and restaurants like Taco Bell and Burger King, and became a global brand in 56 countries. Cinnabon's 2013 sales were estimated to be $1 billion.

Cole worked anonymously in several of Cinnabon's retail and production roles during her appearance on the American television show Undercover Boss, including at both traditional Cinnabon locations as well as a Cinnabon kiosk inside a Flying J truck stop in Virginia. At the time the show aired in 2012, she was 34 years old and the youngest CEO to appear on Undercover Boss. Among a number of other awards and accolades, Cole was also recognized by Fortune Magazine in 2013 for its 40 under 40 list.

In the winter of 2015, Cole moved to become group president of Focus Brands, the company that owns Cinnabon as well as Moe's and Auntie Anne's.

== Tenure at AG1 ==
In 2021, Cole was named President and COO of AG1, formerly known as Athletic Greens. Cole was recruited by the company's founder after he heard her speak on Anthony Pompliano's "The Pomp Podcast." In July 2024, she was promoted to CEO of AG1.

== Non-profit and humanitarian work ==
Cole has worked in Africa for sustainable development of women and children in need. She has also volunteered and advocated for many food service related organizations.

== Awards and memberships ==
- Member of the board of directors for the Women's Foodservice Forum
- Motivator of the year award by Elliot Leadership Institute (2008)
- Serves as the chair of the Certification Governing Board for the National Restaurant Association Education Foundation (NRAEF)
- Awarded Georgia Restaurant Association Crystal of Excellence (GRACE) Award (2010)
- Serves as past chair for Georgia Restaurant Association (GRA) on the executive committee
- Women's Foodservice Forum volunteer of the year award (2007)
- She has been a chair for many committees and projects of organizations dealing with food service and hospitality
- Ranked No. 40 in Fortune's 40 under 40 top young business stars (2013)

== Personal life ==
In 2015, Cole became engaged to Daley Ervin. The couple married in 2016 at Burning Man.
