= T.J. Cinnamons =

American fast food chain

T.J. Cinnamons logo

T.J. Cinnamons was an American fast food chain specializing in cinnamon rolls and baked goods.

== History ==
The concept for T.J. Cinnamons emerged during a summer vacation on Lake Superior when Ted Rice, a television news cameraman at KCTV, and his wife Joyce, a fifth-grade teacher, discussed pursuing a business venture. They originally considered opening a deli or an arts-and-crafts store but ultimately settled on a bakery that specialized in cinnamon rolls.

Joyce Rice spent approximately eight months refining a cinnamon roll recipe, using taste testers, including Ted's colleagues at the KCTV newsroom. The final product, a nine-ounce cinnamon roll, became the company's signature item. With an initial investment of $50,000 and loans from friends and relatives, the couple developed a custom-built mobile bakery under the name T.J. Cinnamons in 1984. The mobile bakery was used to sell the cinnamon rolls for $1.25 at fairs, art shows, rodeos, and other events across 21 Midwestern states, testing the market and gathering customer feedback. Ted would often assist during weekends while continuing his full-time job.

Encouraged by positive reception, the Rices transitioned from a mobile bakery to a permanent retail location in 1985, opening their first store in the Ward Parkway Center mall in Kansas City. Positioned between escalators on the lower level, the location allowed the aroma of baking cinnamon rolls to attract customers. The store design featured a glass ceiling, enabling shoppers to observe the baking process. The store's success prompted inquiries about franchising, leading the Rices to explore expansion opportunities. One such inquiry was from Rich Komen, who wanted to open a franchise at the SeaTac Mall in Federal Way, Washington; however, negotiations fell through and Komen ultimately went on to found competitor Cinnabon. In June 1985, the Rices partnered with Kenneth Hill, a seasoned executive with experience in restaurant operations and franchising, to grow the business nationally. Ted Rice left his television position to serve as chairman of the board, Joyce became vice president, and Hill assumed the role of president.

By 1989, the company had more than 230 outlets in the U.S. and Canada.

In 1996, T.J.Cinnamons was bought by Arby's, which was a subsidiary of Triarc Companies. In 2011, Triarc Companies (which is now known as The Wendy's Company) sold 81.5% of Arby's to Roark Capital Group, although the T.J. Cinnamons chain remained with the Wendy's Company. Many Arby's locations continue to feature T.J. Cinnamons despite Roark (through its subsidiary Focus Brands) owning its more well-known rival, Cinnabon.
