= Cinnabon Swirl =

Restaurant information
- Location: United States
- Website: cinnabonswirl.com

Cinnabon Swirls is a chain of restaurants operated by Cinnabon parent company GoTo Foods. Locations serve products by both Cinnabon and Carvel.

== History and locations ==
The business has operated in the following cities:

- Hillsboro, Oregon
- Kennesaw, Georgia
- Pasadena, California
- Peoria, Arizona
