= AG1 (company) =

American food supplement company

- Formerly: Athletic Greens
- Type: Private
- Industry: Food processing
- Founded: December 2010; 15 years ago
- Founder: Chris Ashenden
- Headquarters: Carson City, Nevada, United States
- Area served: North America; Europe; Oceania
- Key people: Kat Cole, CEO
- Products: Supplements
- Number of employees: 450 (2026); 515 (2026)
- Website: drinkag1.com

AG1, formerly known as Athletic Greens, is an American company whose best known product is a brand of a daily health supplement in powder form of the same name. The company was founded in 2010 by Chris Ashenden, a former New Zealand police officer. The product is advertised as a green powder that combines multiple supplements to meet a consumer's nutritional needs. It heavily relies on influencer marketing, particularly on podcasts. Its usefulness as a dietary supplement has been subject of criticism, with critics questioning the company’s claims regarding the product's effectiveness, and high price.

== History ==
Athletic Greens was founded in 2010 by Chris Ashenden, a former New Zealand police officer. The company is registered in Nevada.

Athletic Greens focused on a single product, a powdered supplement containing 75 ingredients called AG1 and followed a direct-to-consumer subscriber model. Between 2010 and 2024, the product's formula changed more than 50 times seeking to increase its wellness benefits. The product is NSF International Certified for Sport.

In December 2021, Athletic Greens hired Kat Cole, former president and COO of Focus Brands as its President and COO and rebranded as AG1. The company reported a revenue growth from US$160 million in 2021 to roughly US$600 million in 2024.

Ashenden resigned from the company in 2024 after his 2011 criminal convictions for a housing scam in New Zealand became public. Cole became CEO.

Paulie Dery, formerly of Yeti, was hired as CMO in 2024, and Ralph Esposito as Chief Science and Nutrition Officer in 2025.

=== Investments and partnerships ===
AG1 uses influencer marketing to promote its supplements. In particular, the company has focused heavily on podcast advertising. It uses affiliate marketing to give content creators a cut of sales referred by them. Tim Ferriss was one of the first podcasters to promote the product and later became an investor in the company. The product has been popular on TikTok and has had celebrity investors including Hugh Jackman, Cindy Crawford and Lewis Hamilton.

AG1 has partnered with Ripper GC of the LIV Golf League, Andrew Huberman, Joe Rogan, and Lex Fridman. As of January 2025, the company is valued at US$1.2 billion.

== Controversy ==
The health benefits of consuming AG1 have been criticised. The scientific methods that are used by AG1 to claim nutritional efforts were criticized by JoAnn Manson, professor of medicine at Harvard Medical School, as lacking scientific "rigor":

These are very small randomized trials. Just as a comparison, we do large-scale randomized clinical trials of many dietary supplements... For a multivitamin, we did a randomized control with 15,000 participants for 11 years to document that there was, in fact, a significant reduction in cancer incidence when taking the multivitamin compared to placebo ... That's what I'm talking about when I say rigor.

Charlotte Martin, a dietitian and author, makes the statement that the amount of individual nutrients that a user absorbs is insignificant due to the addition of a relatively large quantity of ingredients present in the powdered mixture.

According to Jonathan Jarry of McGill University, the AG1 blend is backed by very little scientific support and has a high cost (around $79 USD per month in 2024) relative to any likely benefit offered.

Other critics have pointed out that a significant number of AG1 ingredients' dosages are not disclosed on the label as they are considered "proprietary".
