= U.S. Bancorp Tower =

42-story skyscraper in Portland, Oregon

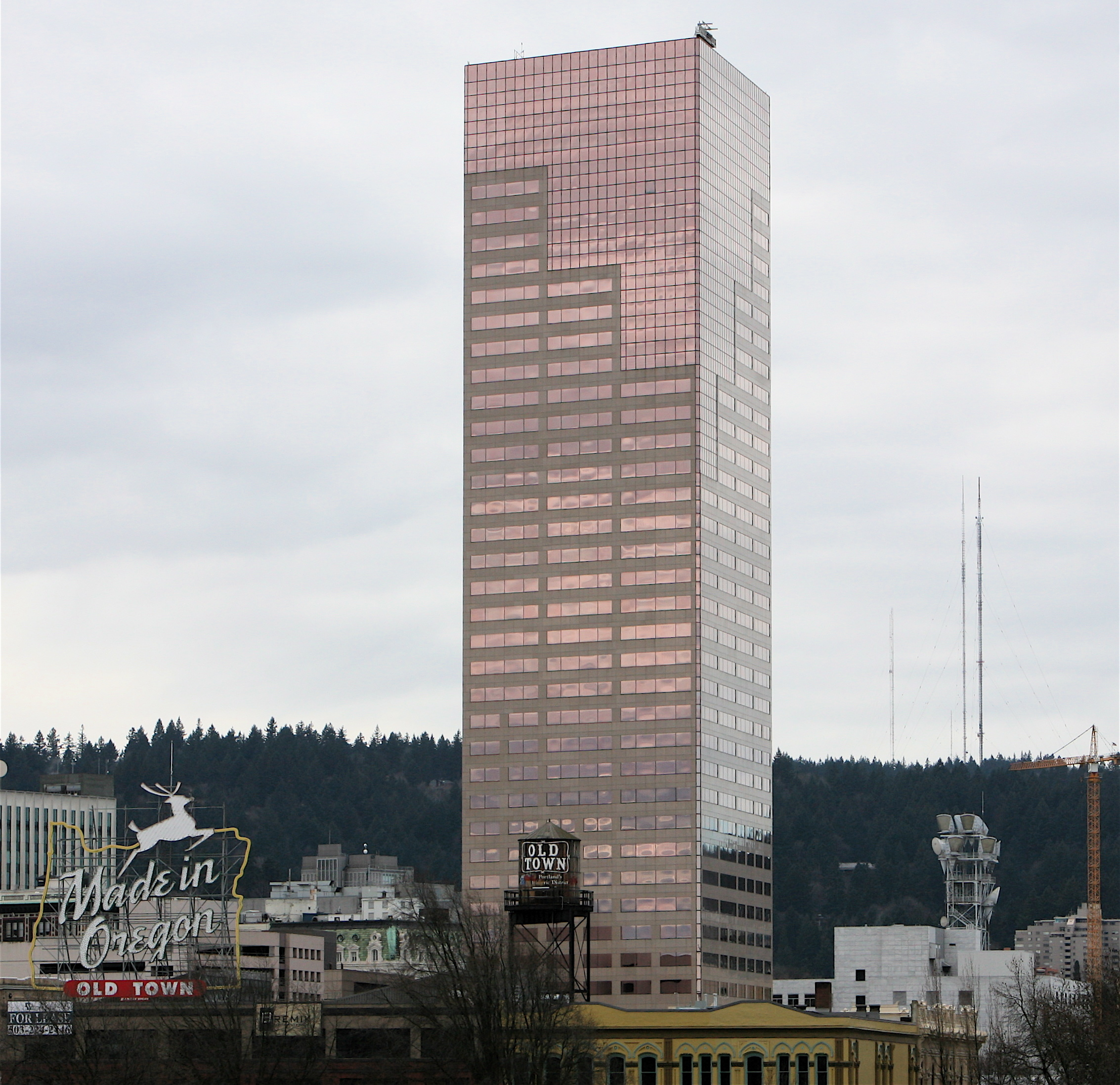
- The building's exterior in 2008

- Location within Portland, Oregon
- Alternative names: Big Pink; Unico/U.S. Bancorp Tower

General information
- Type: Commercial offices
- Architectural style: Modernism
- Location: 111 SW 5th Avenue; Portland, Oregon
- Coordinates: 45.5228°N 122.6762°W
- Construction started: 1981
- Completed: 1983
- Cost: US$60 million
- Owner: Unico Properties, Wafra Investment Advisory Group, Broadreach Capital Partners

Height
- Roof: 163.38 m (536.0 ft)

Technical details
- Floor count: 42 (above ground)
- Floor area: 69,000 m^{2} (740,000 sq ft)
- Lifts/elevators: 20

Design and construction
- Architect: Skidmore, Owings & Merrill
- Developer: U.S. Bancorp
- Main contractor: Howard S. Wright Construction

The U.S. Bancorp Tower (also known as "Big Pink") is a 42-story, 163.38 m (536.0 ft) skyscraper in Portland, Oregon. It is the second tallest building in the city after Wells Fargo Center, and with its nearly 69,000 m^{2} (740,000 sq ft) office space, it is the largest in Oregon in terms of volume.

== History ==
Designed by Skidmore, Owings and Merrill (SOM) with Pietro Belluschi as the consultant, the tower cost $60 million to construct. Ground was broken on May 29, 1981, and the building was largely completed in June 1983. It was dedicated on December 1, 1983. The tower adjoins U.S. Bank Plaza at 555 SW Oak Street, a 7-story, 497,800 sq ft (46,250 m^{2}) building constructed in 1974. A tower expected to rise about 37 stories was already part of the bank's long-term site plans at that earlier date, but that phase of the plans ended up being delayed until the 1980s.

Originally, the building served as the national headquarters of U.S. Bancorp, and was the regional headquarters of that organization until a 1997 merger moved the corporate offices to Minneapolis, Minnesota. As of 2004, U.S. Bancorp had 480,000 sq ft (45,000 m^{2}) leased until 2015.

During the 1980s and 1990s, the top floors held the headquarters of Louisiana-Pacific.

Since a $4 million renovation in 2002, the 30th floor of the tower has been occupied by the Portland City Grill, Portland's top-grossing restaurant. It has been cited as the restaurant with the best view in Portland.

In 2000, the U.S. Bancorp Tower was sold for a price of $165 million to a partnership of three firms: Unico Properties, JPMorgan and Wafra Investment Advisory Group. In 2004, a majority stake in the tower was acquired by California-based Broadreach Capital Partners LLC, which bought-out JPMorgan and Wafra, but Unico continued to own 25 percent. At that time, 92 percent of the building was leased.

In August 2006, a majority stake in the building was purchased by "institutional investors advised by JPMorgan Asset Management" for a price of $286 million.

In 2008 LaSalle Investment Management purchased a majority stake in the building from Unico Properties; the building had an estimated value of $285 million at the time. LaSalle sold their stake in 2015, to TPF Equity REIT that is majority-owned by UBS. Unico Properties retains a minority share in the building. The sale price was $372.5 million, a record for any office building in the Portland area.

In 2024, U.S. Bank announced it would not renew its lease and leave the building. Unico put the tower up for sale in May 2025, and Jeff Swickard bought it for about $45 million in an all-cash transaction in July 2025.

== Design ==
Perhaps the most unusual features of the U.S. Bancorp Tower are its shape and color. Pietro Belluschi was most concerned about the play of light and shadows on its surface; meanwhile, the SOM team had to work with a uniquely shaped lot due to the street grid. Because of the street grid, the tower features no right angles in its parallelogram footprint. This, in turn, makes it look either extremely slender or wide depending upon one's viewing angle. Belluschi carefully selected the glass and granite for the exterior facing. The pink granite covering the building was quarried in Spain. The glazing used for the windows is also pink, an effect caused by its being "glazed in a semitransparent coating of copper and silver that looks pink from the outside". The windows can absorb or reflect light depending upon how much light is upon them, while the surrounding granite may appear darker or lighter than the window panes, depending upon the time of day. The unusual color earned the building the nickname "Big Pink". From 2013 to 2015, the entire building underwent interior design renovation.

In October 2019, the building achieved the Leadership in Energy and Environmental Design Platinum certification for environmental sustainability from the U.S. Green Building Council.

== See also ==
- List of tallest buildings in Portland, Oregon
