= Seattle's Best Coffee =

Coffee retailer and wholesaler

- Product type: Coffee
- Current owner: Nestlé (2022–present)
- Produced by: Starbucks
- Country: United States
- Introduced: 1970; 56 years ago
- Previous owners: AFC Enterprises (1998–2003); Starbucks (2003–2022)
- Website: www.seattlesbest.com

Seattle's Best Coffee LLC is a subsidiary of Nestlé whose brand is used to sell wholesale coffee, ground coffee, whole-bean coffee, and coffee K-cups. While this brand used to have coffeehouses in the United States, it no longer advertises them on its website. Some of these coffeehouses have converted to Starbucks while Starbucks previously owned this brand. GoTo Foods owns the franchising rights for this brand's coffeehouses for international markets and military bases. Starbucks still roasts the coffee for this brand despite having sold this subsidiary to Nestlé in 2022.

Seattle's Best Coffee is generally less expensive than Starbucks, its former parent, and is marketed as more of a working class coffee compared to the upmarket Starbucks.

== History ==
Original logo used from 1999 until 2010

Logo from 2010 until 2025

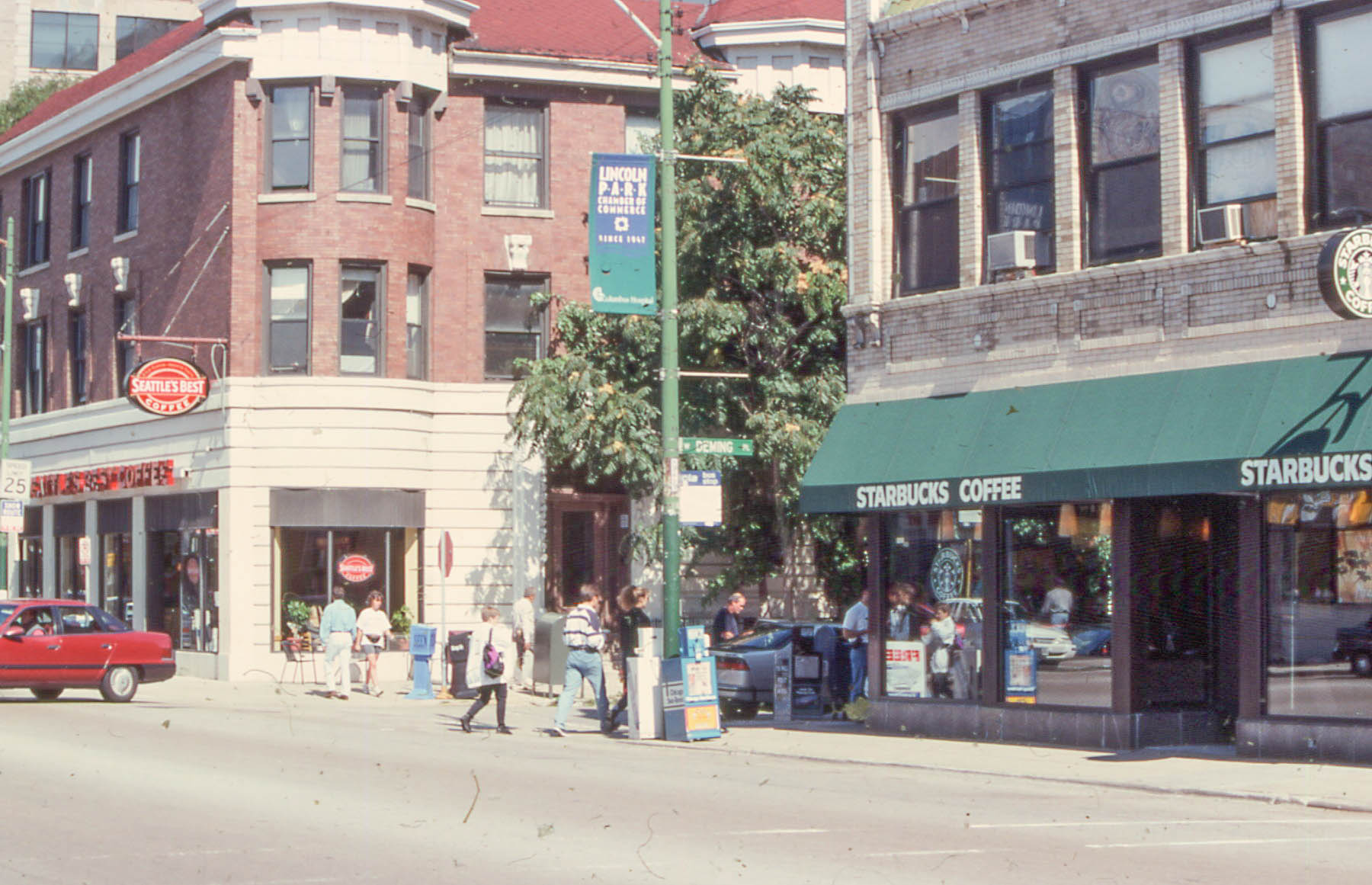
A Seattle's Best Coffee shop next to a Starbucks in Lincoln Park, Chicago, in 1997

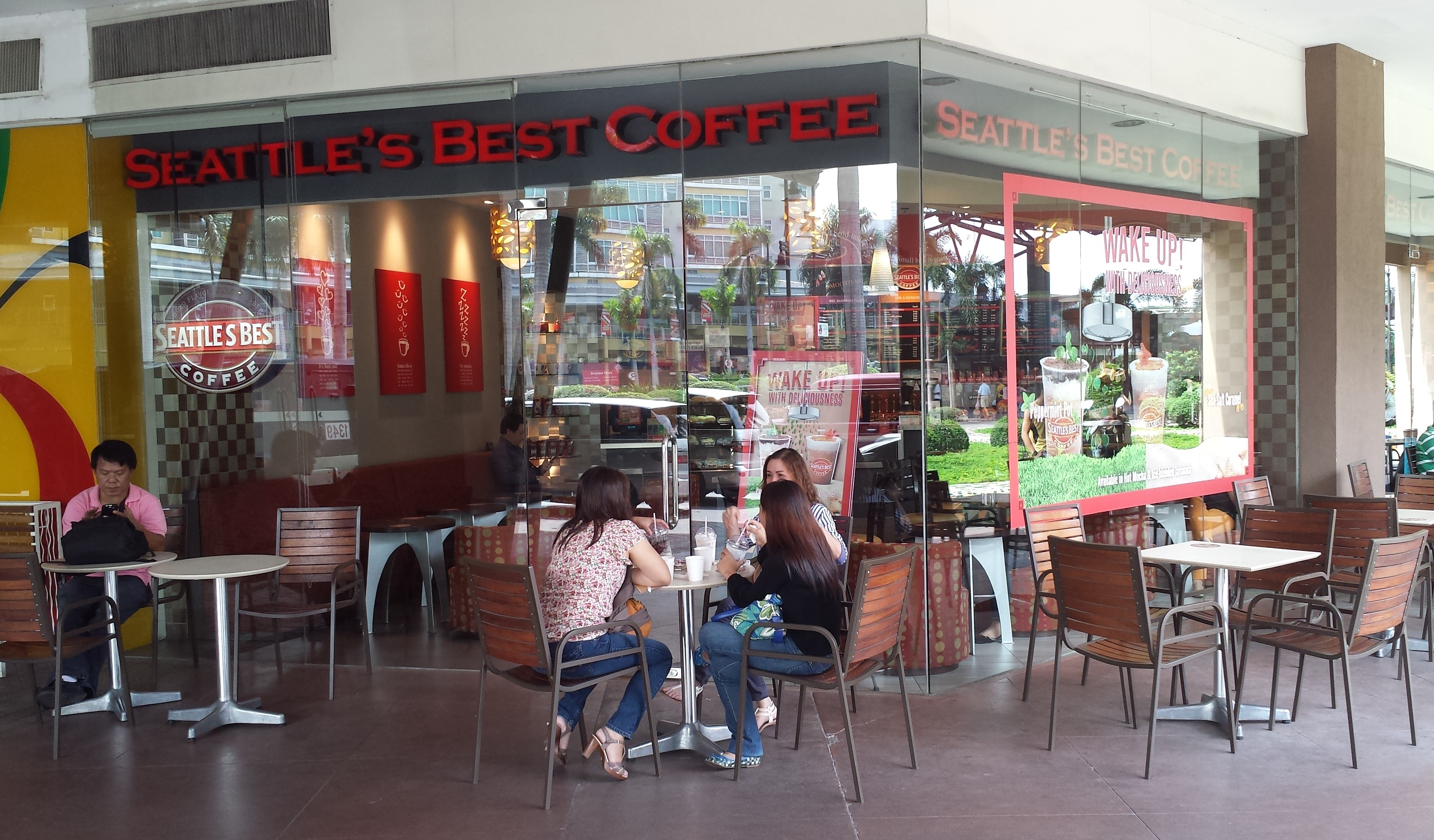
Seattle's Best Coffee at Market! Market! in Bonifacio Global City, Taguig, Metro Manila, Philippines

Seattle's Best Coffee began as a combination ice cream and coffee shop called the Wet Whisker in Coupeville on Whidbey Island, northwest of Seattle, in 1969. Founder Jim Stewart purchased green coffee beans from local roasters to be roasted and sold at the Wet Whisker. By the end of the second summer, the shop had roasted and sold nearly 500 lbs (226 kg) of coffee. By the end of the following year, the Vashon Island Wet Whisker was sold, and Jim Stewart, along with his brother Dave, opened another ice cream and coffee store on Pier 70 on Seattle's Waterfront. The shop was called Stewart Brothers Wet Whisker. In 1982, it began serving espresso based beverages alongside other coffee products.

In 1983, the name again changed from Stewart Brothers Wet Whisker to Stewart Brothers Coffee. Shortly after, business began to expand, and new shops opened in Bellevue, Washington, and at Seattle's historic Pike Place Market a year later. In 1991, the company was renamed "Seattle's Best Coffee" after winning a local competition.

Around 1995, the company was purchased by a group of investors who own Torrefazione Italia. They formed a new company made up of both parties called Seattle Coffee Holdings. In 1997, Seattle Coffee Holdings changed its name to Seattle Coffee Company. In 1998, AFC Enterprises purchased Seattle Coffee Holdings and began franchising the Seattle's Best Coffee brand. During AFC Enterprises' ownership, Seattle Coffee Company's Vashon Island roasterie was upgraded and the company's organic coffee line was established. AFC Enterprises sold SBC to Starbucks in July 2003, retaining franchise rights in eleven countries, Hawaii and U.S. military bases.

Starbucks closed the Vashon Island facility on October 23, 2003, and moved production to their Kent, Washington, roastery. SBC had previously stored beans at the Port of Seattle and transported them to Vashon for roasting, which was deemed insufficient for the company's needs. The historic Vashon Island roastery building which includes Jim Stewart's original 1952 roaster, while no longer affiliated with SBC or Starbucks, was bought and reopened as "The Vashon Island Coffee Roasterie" when the owner of The Minglement, an organic foods, herbs, and spices store, decided to move her store to a larger store. This store continues to employ Peter Larsen, the coffee roast master who worked at this store when it was previously part of Seattle's Best Coffee.

On October 18, 2022, Starbucks sold Seattle's Best Coffee to Nestlé.

In 2025, Nestlé filed a lawsuit against Seattle Strong, a small canned coffee company based in Seattle, claiming that the name Seattle Strong infringes on the name of Seattle's Best Coffee. In March 2026, Nestlé expanded its lawsuit to also include the logo and branding of Seattle Strong. Founder of Seattle Strong, Evan Oeflein, claims that Nestlé is attempting to sue over the usage of the name Seattle, and argues that a multinational corporation should not be able to prevent small businesses from naming themselves after their home city.

== Distribution partners ==
The Borders bookstore chain signed a contract with Seattle's Best Coffee in 2004 to convert Borders' in-store cafes to Seattle's Best cafes. By 2006, approximately two-thirds of Borders' domestic superstores had completed the Seattle's Best conversion. Seattle's Best parent company Starbucks Corporation has contracted with Borders' competitor Barnes & Noble to sell its products in Barnes & Noble's Cafes. (Borders has since completely shut down due to bankruptcy.) Starbucks also owns and operates locations within Chapters and Indigo Books and Music bookstores in Canada.

Seattle's Best Coffee Cafes are found in larger JCPenney department stores when the company signed a contract in the late 1990s to have in-store cafés in department stores.

Seattle's Best Coffee Cafes and Kiosks can also be found on all 21 ships in the fleet of the cruise line Royal Caribbean International under the name "Latte-Tudes" or "Cafe Promenade". The presence of the Seattle's Best outlets on Royal Caribbean is also tied in with all other free-of-charge coffee items on the ship also being exclusively supplied by SBC. The Oasis class ships also have Starbucks outlet with the regular land price list, SBC is for-free (included in cruise cost)

On February 16, 2010, Burger King announced that they would add Seattle's Best Coffee to their menu in over 7,000 restaurants.

On May 12, 2010, Starbucks announced a rebranding of Seattle's Best Coffee, with a new logo and plans to expand Seattle's Best Coffee distribution from 3,000 locations to 30,000 by the end of the 2010 fiscal year. The rebranding of the Seattle's Best Coffee logo from the detailed, vintage logo to the clinical, generic design for the new mass market was met with much criticism, with the new logo being likened to a label for eye-drops, a blood-bank sign and a gas station logo.

On February 8, 2011, Delta Air Lines and Seattle's Best entered into an agreement to offer Seattle's Best Coffee onboard all domestic, international, and Delta Connection flights beginning March 1, 2011. Since February 2015; however, Delta adjusted its coffee offerings in favor of Seattle's Best's then-parent company Starbucks on all flights.

The Swedish fast food chain Max Hamburgers ended its partnership with Seattle's Best Coffee and discontinued serving their coffee on November 13, 2019.

== See also ==
- List of coffeehouse chains
