= Andrew Huberman =

American neuroscientist and podcaster (born 1975)

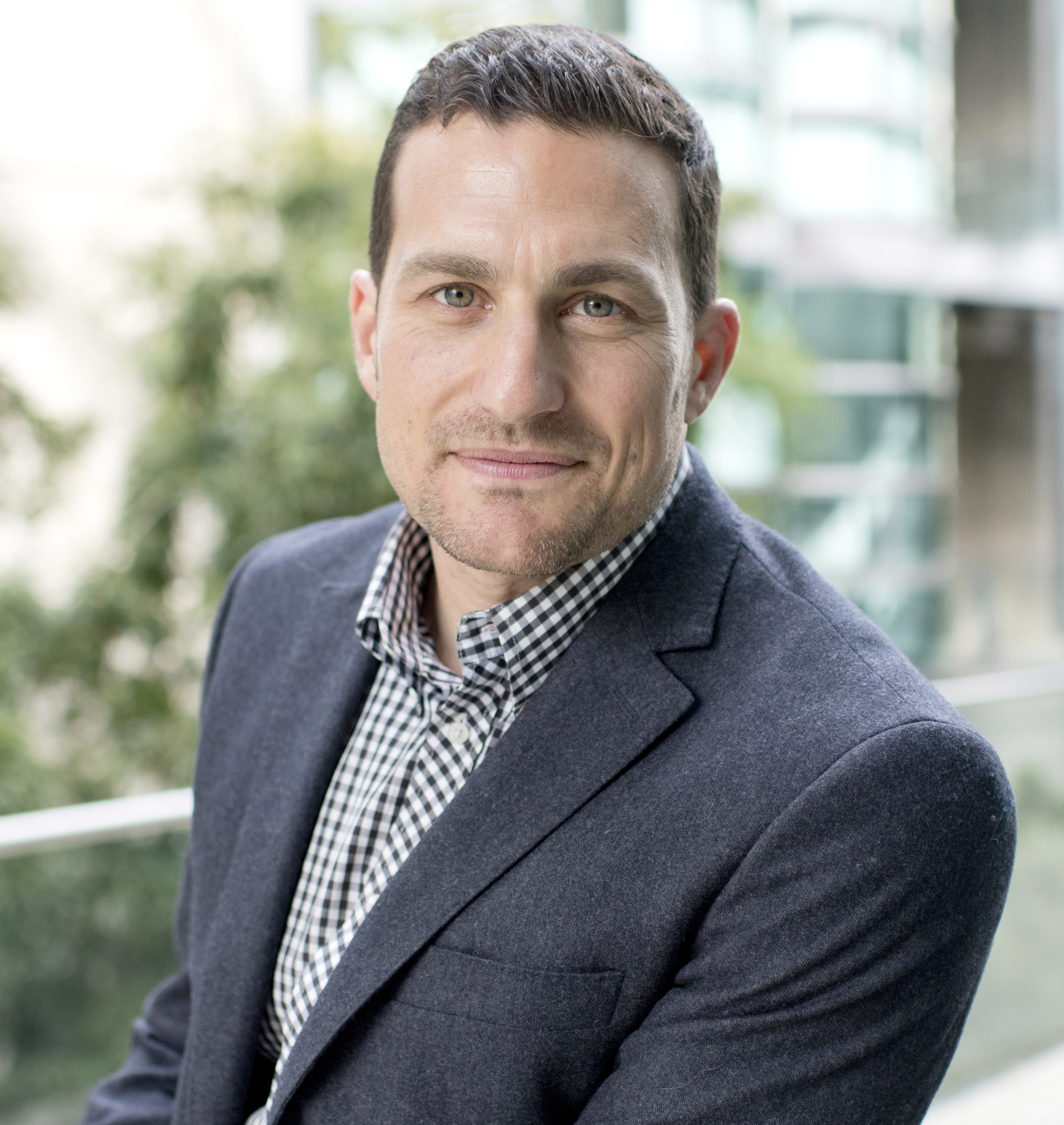
- Huberman in 2016
- Born: Andrew David Huberman; September 26, 1975 (age 51); Palo Alto, California, U.S.
- Education: University of California, Santa Barbara (BA); University of California, Berkeley (MA); University of California, Davis (PhD)
- Known for: Huberman Lab podcast Visual system regeneration research
- Father: Bernardo Huberman
- Awards: Cogan Award (2017); Pew Biomedical Scholar (2013–2017); McKnight Scholar (2013–2016); Allan G. Marr Prize (2005)
- Scientific career
- Fields: Neuroscience
- Workplaces: Stanford University; University of California, San Diego
- Thesis: Neural activity and axon guidance cue regulation of eye-specific retinogeniculate development (2004)
- Academic advisors: Ben Barres (Stanford); Barbara Chapman (UCD)
- Website: hubermanlab.com

Andrew David Huberman (born September 26, 1975) is an American neuroscientist, author, and podcaster. He is an associate professor of neurobiology and ophthalmology at the Stanford University School of Medicine. He has been the host of the health and science-focused podcast Huberman Lab since 2021, and has a Google H-index of 46 with over 14,742 citations. Huberman has drawn criticism from scientists for promoting dietary supplements and for making poorly evidenced health claims.

Huberman is the son of Argentine physicist Bernardo Huberman. He earned a B.A. in psychology from UC Santa Barbara in 1998, an M.A. in psychology from UC Berkeley in 2000, and a Ph.D. in neuroscience from UC Davis in 2004. Huberman conducted postdoctoral research at Stanford under Ben Barres, focusing on the visual system, and held faculty positions at UC San Diego and later Stanford, where his lab studies vision regeneration, stress mitigation, and non-pharmacological interventions for anxiety.

== Early life and education ==
Huberman was born in 1975 at Stanford Hospital in Palo Alto, California. His father, the Argentine physicist Bernardo Huberman, is also a professor at Stanford, and his mother is a children's book author.

As a child, Huberman was involved in athletics, including soccer and swimming. His parents divorced when he was 12 years old. After his parents' divorce, he withdrew from academics, developed an interest in skateboarding, and considered a career as a firefighter. He attended Gunn High School. After developing interests in therapy and biopsychology, he attended Foothill College.

Huberman graduated from the University of California, Santa Barbara, in 1998 with a B.A. in psychology. He then earned an M.A. in psychology in 2000 from the University of California, Berkeley. While at Berkeley, Huberman approached Carla J. Shatz to be his doctoral advisor, though she declined because she was concerned that he had a limited background in cellular molecular biology and would be moving her lab to Harvard University. She encouraged Huberman to transfer to the University of California, Davis, and work under Dr. Barbara Chapman. Huberman obtained a Ph.D. in neuroscience from UC Davis in 2004.

== Academic career ==
Huberman's academic research has focused on the development, function, and repair of visual circuits, including efforts to understand and regenerate damaged visual systems. His research has also examined neural circuits involved in responses to visual threats and defensive behavior.

Huberman spent five years at Stanford University as a postdoc under Ben Barres between 2006 and 2011. From 2006 to 2009, he was a Helen Hay Whitney Postdoctoral Fellow. During his postdoctoral work at Stanford, Huberman developed genetic tools to study the visual system and contributed to Thrasher.

From 2011 to 2015, Huberman was an assistant professor of neurobiology and neuroscience at the University of California, San Diego. Huberman became associate professor of neurobiology at the Stanford School of Medicine in 2016. Huberman's lab, established at UCSD and transferred with his move to Stanford, continued work on mapping the visual system.

In 2016, Huberman was the senior author of a mouse study investigating optic-nerve regeneration using high-contrast visual stimulation combined with gene therapy. The researchers reported retinal-axon regrowth and partial recovery of some visual behaviors, but the approach was not ready for use in humans. The lab also researched non-pharmacological interventions for anxiety disorders, including VR exposure to controlled stressors and breathing techniques.

In 2023, Huberman's lab, with David Spiegel, published a research paper on stress mitigation and carried out research on cortisol. The lab also released a study on the regeneration of the visual system, contributing to the understanding of stress management techniques and the potential for visual system recovery.

In 2024, New York Magazine stated that Huberman's lab at Stanford "barely exists", with only a single postdoctoral researcher working there and the lab having been scaled back significantly during the COVID-19 pandemic. A spokesperson for Huberman said that the lab was still operational. In September 2026, Huberman published Protocols: An Operating Manual for the Human Body, which debuted at number one on The New York Times Best Seller list in the Advice, How-To & Miscellaneous category.

== Podcasts ==
Huberman was introduced to Robert Mohr in 2019, a New York-based health and fitness publicist who produced "The Fight with Teddy Atlas," a boxing podcast. As the COVID-19 pandemic progressed, Huberman grew dissatisfied with what he viewed as health authorities' narrow focus on the virus without providing guidance for improving public health. Mohr facilitated Huberman's appearances on major podcasts, including those hosted by Joe Rogan and Rich Roll. These appearances helped increase his social media following. By the end of 2020, Huberman had appeared on Lex Fridman's technology podcast. Fridman encouraged him to start his own podcast.

In 2021, Huberman launched the Huberman Lab podcast. In the same year, Huberman and Mohr co-founded Scicomm Media to produce science-related content. As of 2023, the podcast had become the third most popular podcast in the US on Spotify platforms and the most followed show on Apple Podcasts. In 2023, GQ magazine called it "one of the most listened to shows in the world." His YouTube channel has 7.5 million subscribers and his Instagram account has 7.4 million. In 2025, The Huberman Lab podcast won the 'Best Wellness & Fitness Podcast' award at the iHeartPodcast Awards.

Jonathan Jarry from the Office for Science and Society has questioned Huberman's promotion of "poorly regulated" dietary supplements. According to Jarry, The Huberman Lab podcast has been sponsored by "companies offering questionable products from the perspective of science-based medicine", including AG1 (formerly Athletic Greens). Joseph Zundell, a cancer biologist, trusts Huberman's expertise in neuroscience but also criticized him for extrapolating animal research for human use without appropriate scientific justification and straying from his area of expertise. These criticisms were echoed by New York Magazine, which also stated that Huberman often "posits certainty where there is ambiguity". Neuroscientist David Berson, who has known Huberman since his postdoctoral research and has been a guest on his podcast, says that Huberman's research is respected among neuroscientists and described his podcast as "a fabulous service for the world" and a way to "open the doors" to the world of science. However, Berson also noted that the research community did not always approve of Huberman's monetization of his podcast through sponsors and partnerships. His promotion of unregulated health supplements has been particularly controversial, as these products often have little scientific evidence supporting their effectiveness. In a 2024 article, biomedical scientist Andrea Love contended Huberman’s podcast frequently makes pseudoscientific claims that appear scientific but lack evidence and plausibility, with Huberman often emphasising his academic credentials to support his positions, with Love citing his endorsement of the "leaky gut" diagnosis, which lacks mainstream medical support. Enrique Alpañés, writing in El Pais in 2025, described Huberman as "He-Man in a lab coat: a bearded, muscular jock with an impressive resume and even better oratory skills ... [preaching] a Silicon Valley-style self-help approach, a kind of “pop neuroscience” focused on lifestyle changes and supplements to work faster and live longer", though opining that Huberman often "recommends activities that are more befitting a deranged shaman than a scientist".

According to an article in Coda, Huberman stated on his podcast that he was "... as scared of sunscreen as I am of melanoma" and discussed concerns about certain sunscreen ingredients, including claims that molecules from some formulations could persist in the body for years. In a subsequent appearance on the Sara Grynberg Podcast, Huberman said his earlier remarks had been taken out of context and clarified that he supports sunscreen use to prevent skin cancer, stating: “There is definitely a case for sunscreen … You don’t want skin cancer. You don’t want to burn … So I use sunscreen.” Huberman has also expressed skepticism towards fluoridation. He has talked about flu vaccination reducing the risk of contracting flu, but he stated that he personally avoids getting flu vaccinations, as he feels he doesn’t interact with enough people daily that would warrant it.

== Awards and grants ==
- Cogan Award for Contributions to Vision Science and Ophthalmology (2017)
- Pew Biomedical Scholar Award (2013–2017)
- McKnight Neuroscience Scholar Award (2013–2016)
- Allan G. Marr Prize (2005)

== Selected publications ==
- Lim JH, Stafford BK, Nguyen PL, Lien BV, Wang C, Zukor K, He Z, Huberman AD (August 2016). "Neural activity promotes long-distance, target-specific regeneration of adult retinal axons". Nat Neurosci (Research article). 19 (8): 1073–84. doi:10.1038/nn.4340. PMC 5708130. PMID 27399843.
- Balban MY, Neri E, Kogon MM, Weed L, Nouriani B, Jo B, Holl G, Zeitzer JM, Spiegel D, Huberman AD (January 2023). "Brief structured respiration practices enhance mood and reduce physiological arousal". Cell Rep Med (Randomized controlled trial). 4 (1) 100895. doi:10.1016/j.xcrm.2022.100895. PMC 9873947. PMID 36630953.
