= McAlister's Deli =

American chain of fast casual restaurants

Coordinates: 34.363925°N 89.516210°W

- Type: Subsidiary
- Industry: Restaurant
- Founded: 1989; 37 years ago in Oxford, Mississippi, United States
- Headquarters: Atlanta, Georgia, U.S.
- Number of locations: 550+
- Area served: United States
- Key people: Michael Freeman (president); Jessica Osborne (vice-president of marketing); Aron Teneyck (vice-president of operations)
- Parent: GoTo Foods
- Website: www.mcalistersdeli.com

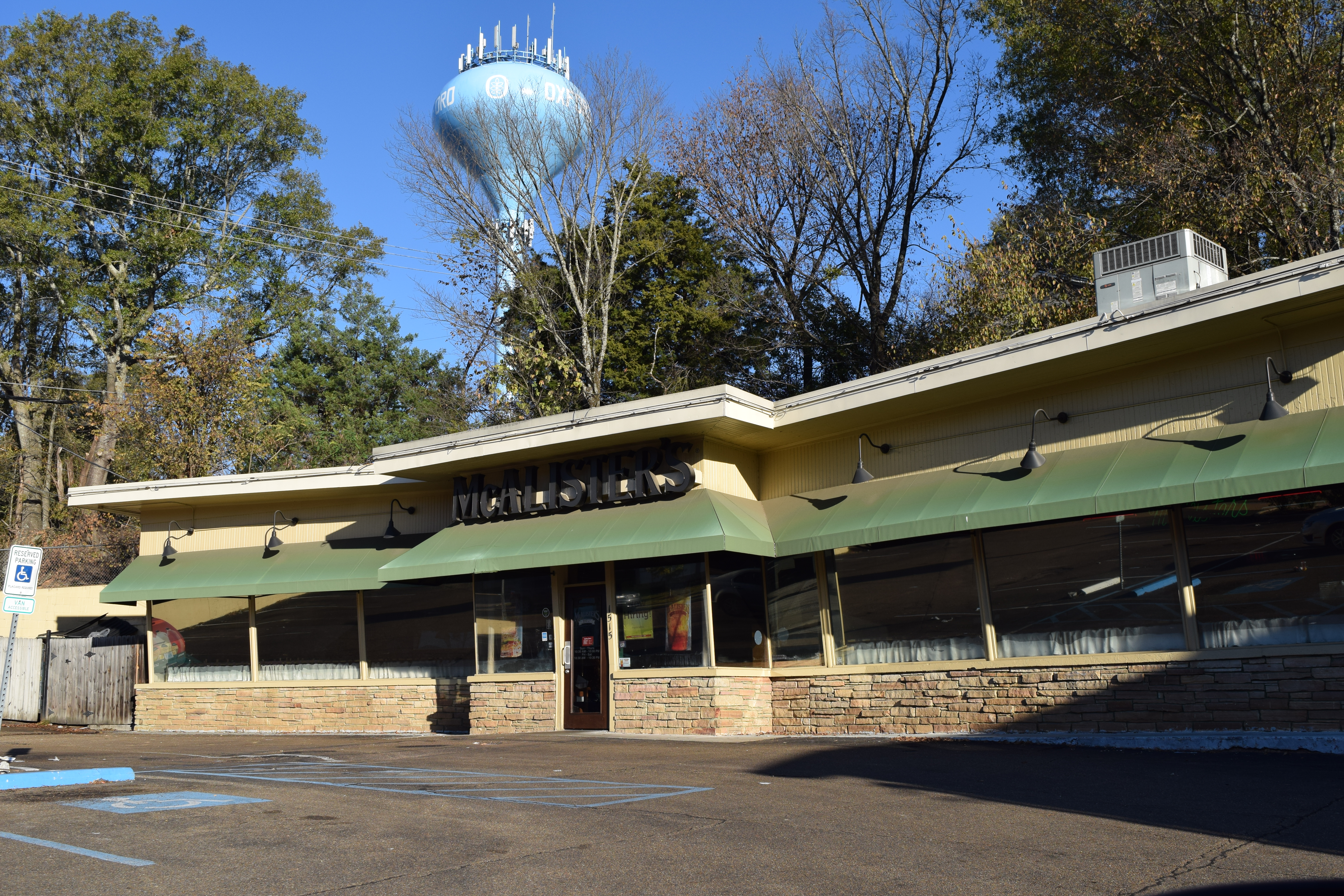
The original McAlister's Deli in Oxford, Mississippi

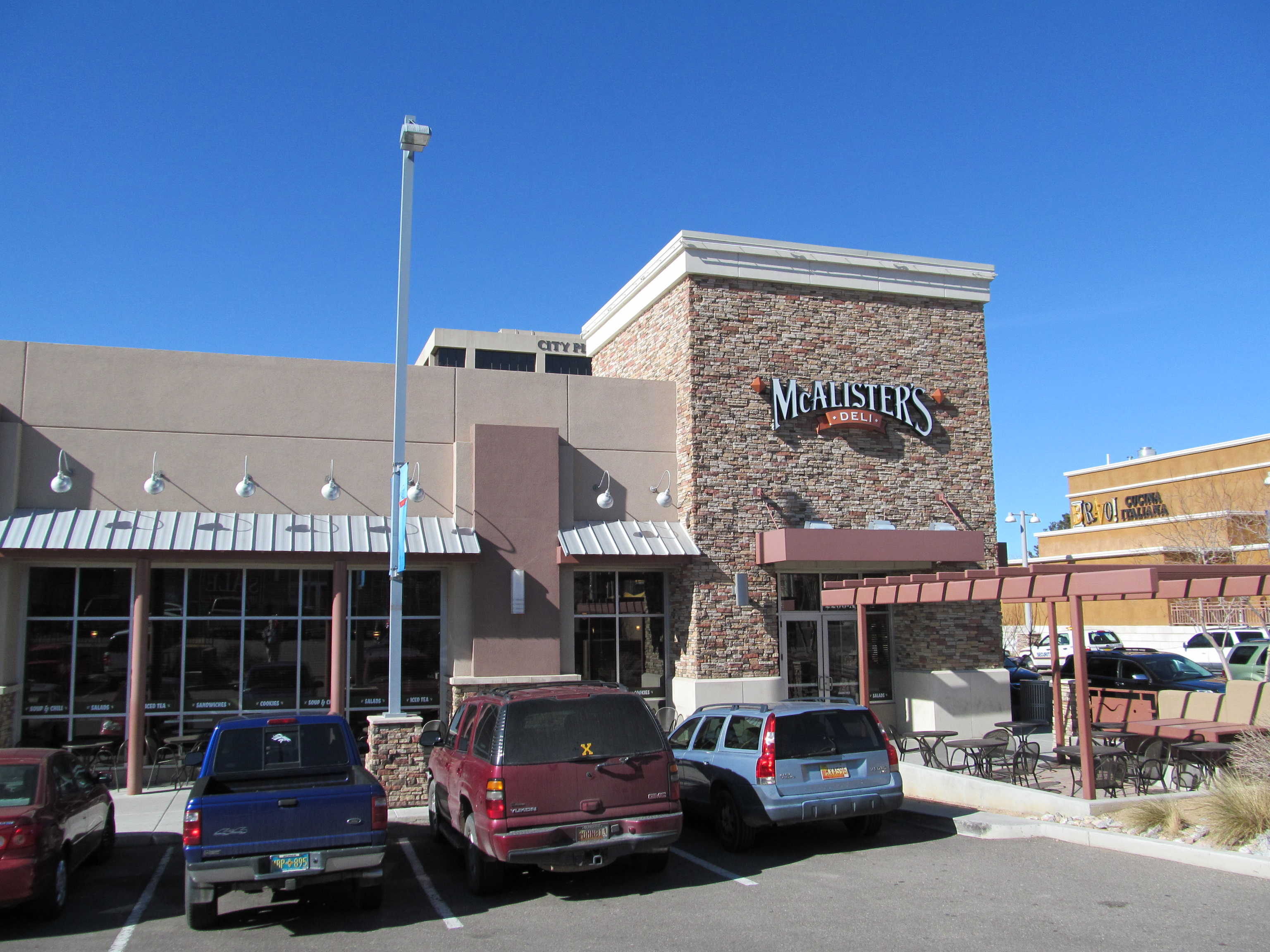
McAlister's Deli in Uptown Albuquerque

McAlister's Deli is an American chain of fast casual restaurants founded in 1989 in Oxford, Mississippi, by retired dentist Don Newcomb. There are currently over 500 locations in 29 states. The menu includes deli sandwiches, "giant spuds" (baked potatoes), soups, salads, and desserts, as well as catering items such as sandwich trays and boxed lunches. The chain is also known for its sweet tea, available by glass or gallon.

McAlister's Deli - together with Schlotzsky's, Carvel, Moe's Southwest Grill, Cinnabon, Jamba, and Auntie Anne's - is part of the GoTo Foods portfolio of brands.

== History ==
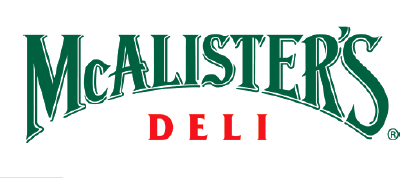
Old logo

The original restaurant was started in an abandoned movie-set diner, and many of the elements of that original look are present in many McAlister's Delis built today, such as a garage door and nostalgic black-and-white tile. The deli originally opened under the name Checker's and was later changed to McAlister's.

In 1999, founder Don Newcomb sold the company to CEO Michael J. Stack and executive Philip Friedman for an undisclosed amount. Stack replaced Newcomb while retaining his CEO position. Newcomb remained in the company as a board director and exclusive franchisee for Kentucky. At the time of the sale, McAlister's Deli had 45 franchised and company-owned locations in the Southeast.

Roark Capital Group acquired McAlister's Deli in 2005. At the time of the acquisition, McAlister's Deli had 170 franchised and company-owned locations in 19 states.

Most McAlister's Deli restaurants are owned and operated by independent franchisees, ranging from single-location, family-owned operations, to larger, multi-unit groups such as Southern Rock Restaurants, JME, Inc., DMAC 81 LLC (with locations in Alabama, Georgia, South Carolina and North Carolina), and The Saxton Group. Southern Rock Restaurants is the largest franchisee of McAlister's Deli, operating 167 locations in 13 states. The chain's headquarters is located in Atlanta, Georgia.

== See also ==
- List of delicatessens
