= The Saxton Group =

- Type: Restaurant Franchise
- Industry: Restaurants
- Founded: 1982 in Jackson, Mississippi
- Headquarters: Dallas, Texas
- Number of employees: 3,500
- Website: www.saxtongroup.com

The Saxton Group is one of the largest franchisees of the restaurant McAlister's Deli. It owns and operates more than 80 locations in Texas, Oklahoma, and Kansas. The growing company continues to expand with plans to open an additional 6-10 locations annually. The Saxton Group is headquartered in Dallas, Texas, and currently employs more than 3,500 employees at its McAlister's Deli locations and corporate office.

== History ==
Founded in 1982 by Kelly Saxton, The Saxton Group began in Jackson, Mississippi, as a franchisee of Mazzio's Pizza. Between 1982 and 1999, The Saxton Group helped to expand the Mazzio's Pizza brand by opening more than 50 locations throughout Mississippi, as well as Arkansas and Texas. In 2004, Saxton turned his attention to McAlister's Deli and sold all of The Saxton Group's Mazzio's locations. The Saxton Group has grown from one single McAlister's Deli location in 2004 to over 65 McAlister's Deli units in 2017, with plans and agreements to open up as many as 40 additional locations in current markets, as well as new markets in Iowa and Nebraska

Today, The Saxton Group is led by co-CEOs Adam G. Saxton and Matt Saxton.
