= Portland City Grill =

Restaurant in Portland, Oregon, U.S.

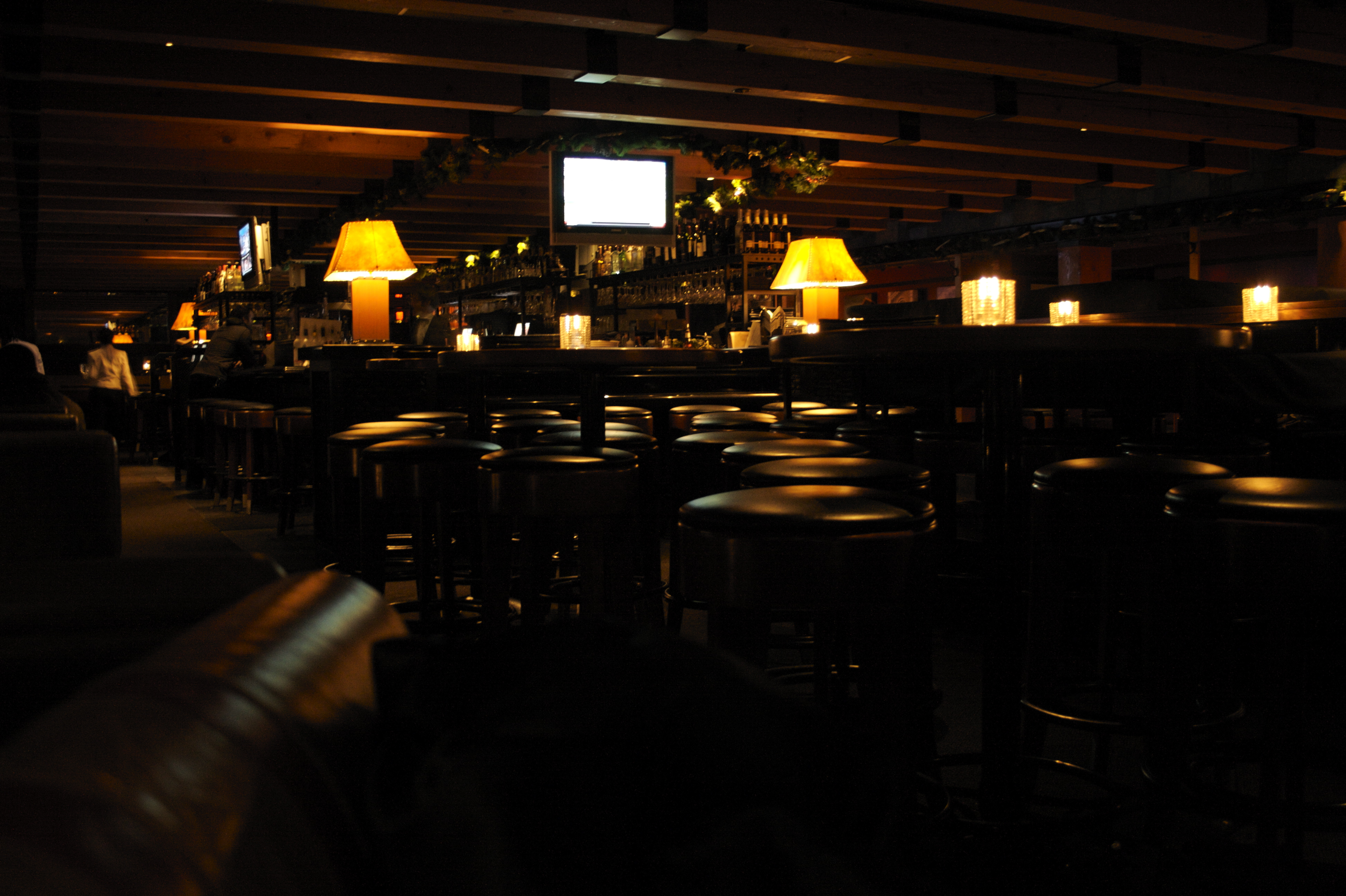
- The interior of the restaurant in 2008
- Interactive map of Portland City Grill

Restaurant information
- Location: 111 SW 5th Avenue, Portland, Oregon, 97204, United States
- Coordinates: 45.52215°N 122.676°W
- Website: portlandcitygrill.com

Portland City Grill is a restaurant located on the 30th floor of the U.S. Bancorp Tower in Portland, Oregon. Known for its happy hour and views of the city and surrounding landscape, Portland City Grill is often listed as a recommended restaurant to eat at in Portland. Portland City Grill is owned by Restaurants Unlimited Inc, based in Seattle.

== Description ==
According to Kelly Edwards of Scott/Edwards Architecture, the ceilings were kept low and the light subdued to preserve the surrounding views. Interior designer Janet Henrich stated that one goal was to have the setting very different from Atwater's Restaurant and Bar, so a more "pastoral" feel was created using river rock, slate tile, and Douglas fir. Henrich attempted using as many materials as possible that could be naturally found in Oregon, including river rock, ribbons of basalt, and beams of Douglas fir from an old barn to line the ceiling. In addition, artwork and photography by Oregonians were used to decorate the walls.

=== Food ===
When the restaurant opened, Fleenor and Pacific Coast Corporate Chef Keith Castro focused on adding seafood, steak, lobster, and sushi to the menu.

== History ==
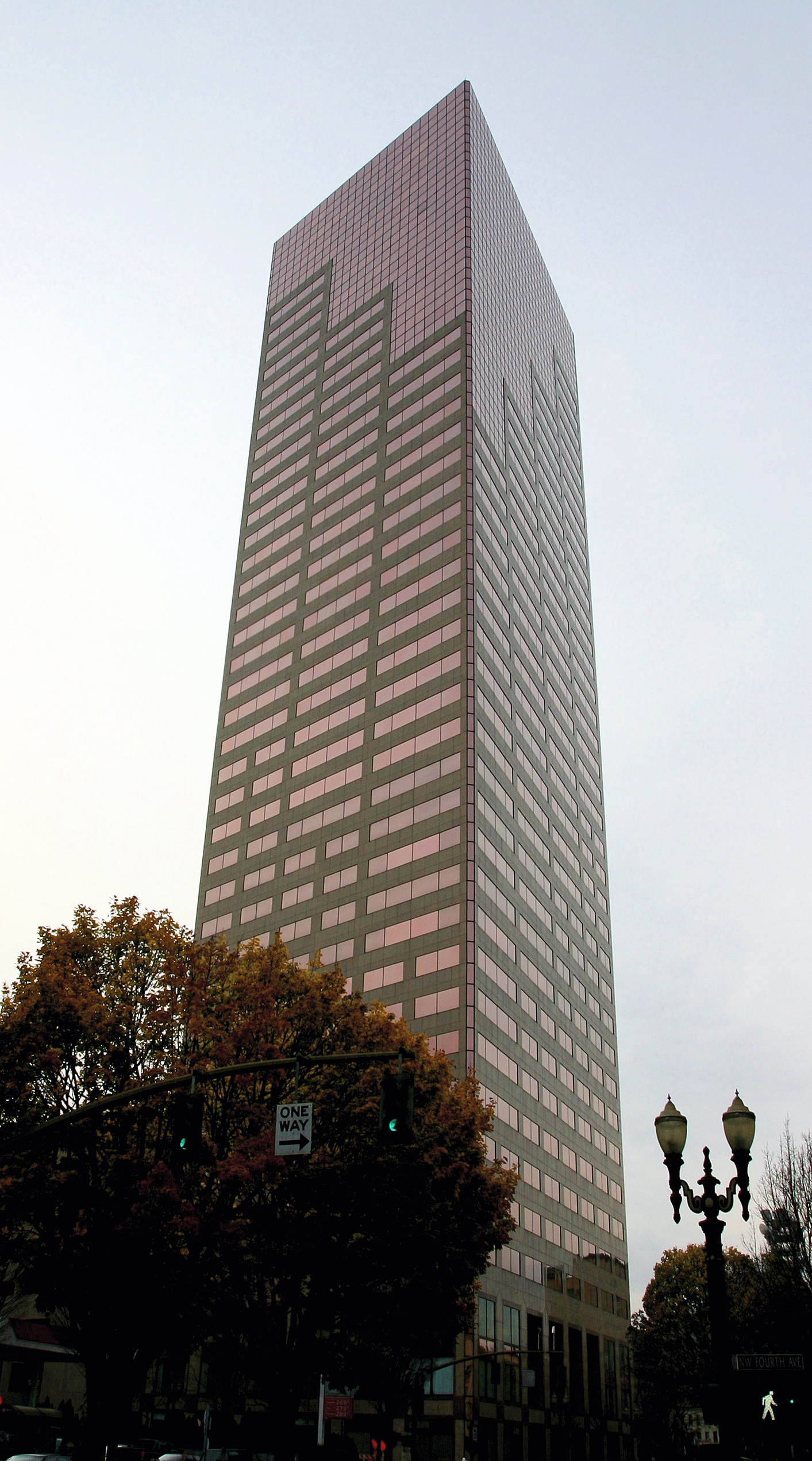
The restaurant is located in the U.S. Bancorp Tower

For nearly two decades, the 18,000-square-foot (1,700 m^{2}) space currently occupied by Portland City Grill belonged to Atwater's Restaurant and Bar. Al Fleenor and Robert MacLellan, founders of the Portland-based company Pacific Coast Restaurants, convinced officials at Unico Properties to lease the space for another restaurant. Unico had previously planned to convert the space into executive offices. Beginning in March 2001 with the assistance of R & H Construction, Scott/Edwards Architecture LLP, and Nelson Henrich Interiors, construction began on a $3 million makeover that doubled the capacity of the space to accommodate 206 patrons in the restaurant and an additional 160 guests in the bar. Portland City Grill officially opened on March 19, 2002.

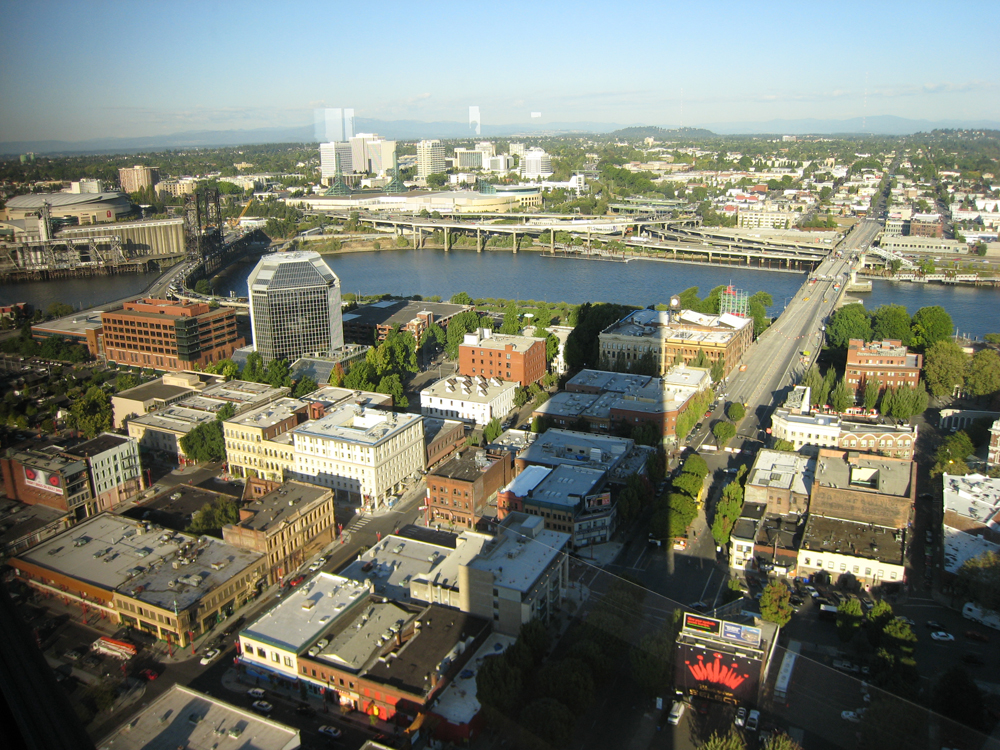
View of the Willamette River and northeast Portland from the restaurant

In 2004, Portland City Grill became Oregon's first and only restaurant to make Restaurants & Institutions magazine's list of the "top 100 highest-grossing independent restaurants" in the United States, placing 43rd place on the list after reporting a sales total of $10.9 million in 2003. As of the 2014 rankings, it had fallen to number 54, though revenue had increased to $13.3 million.

== Reception ==
Willamette Week voters ranked Portland City Grill first place in the following categories: "Best New Hometown Restaurant" (2002), "Best Restaurant to Bring Friends from Out of Town" (2004), "Best Meat Market" (2005), and "Best Happy Hour" (2004–2007).
