= Bernardo Huberman =

American computer scientist

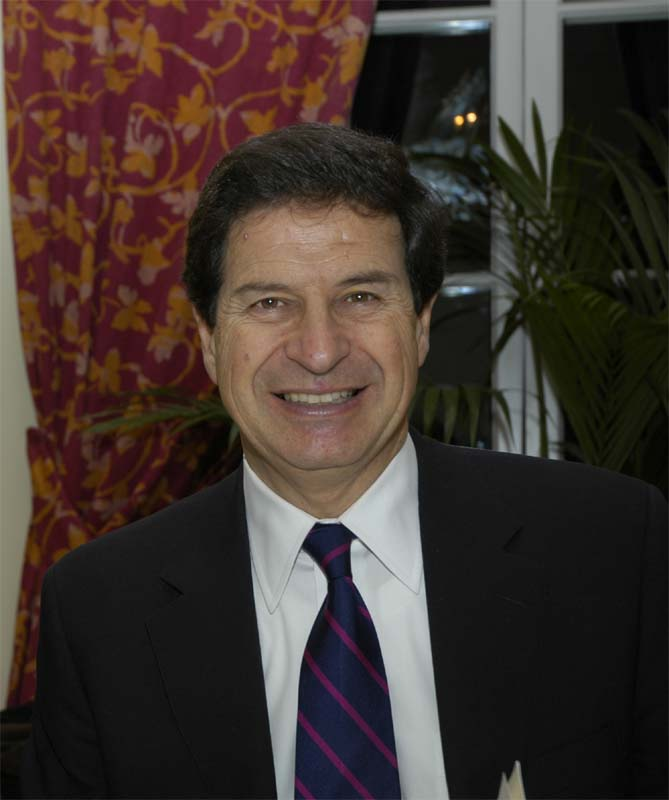
- Born: Argentina
- Education: University of Pennsylvania, University of Buenos Aires
- Known for: ecology of computation Prediction markets dynamics of complex structures
- Children: Lara Huberman, Andrew D. Huberman
- Scientific career
- Fields: Physics; Computer Science
- Workplaces: Xerox PARC; Stanford University; Hewlett-Packard Labs

Bernardo Huberman is a fellow and vice president of the Next-Gen Systems Team at CableLabs. He is also a consulting professor in the Department of Applied Physics and the Symbolic System Program at Stanford University.

== Early life and work ==
Originally from Argentina, Huberman received his MS at the University of Buenos Aires, Argentina, in 1966. He received his PhD in physics from the University of Pennsylvania in 1971. He is the father of neuroscientist Andrew Huberman. He has worked as a visiting scientist at the Institut Laue-Langevin in Grenoble, France, and the Institute of Theoretical Physics, Hebrew University of Jerusalem. He was also a visiting professor at the University of Paris, the École Normale Supérieure, in Paris, France, the Niels Bohr Institute in Copenhagen, Denmark, and the European School of Business, INSEAD, in France. He served as a trustee and secretary at the Aspen Center for Physics between 1980 and 1983.

Huberman originally worked in condensed matter physics, ranging from superionic conductors to two-dimensional superfluids, and made contributions to the theory of critical phenomena in low-dimensional systems. He was one of the discoverers of chaos in a number of physical systems, and also established a number of universal properties in nonlinear dynamical systems. His research into the dynamics of complex structures led to the discovery of ultradiffusion in hierarchical systems.

Huberman joined Xerox Corporation's Palo Alto Research Center, PARC, where, in the field of information sciences, he predicted the existence of phase transitions in large scale distributed systems, and developed an economics approach to the solution of hard computational problems. He has authored or edited three books about the ecology of computation and the ecology of the web .

In 1989 he and colleagues designed and implemented Spawn, a market system for the allocation of resources among machines in computer networks, and a few years later a multiagent thermal market mechanism for the control of building environments. A similar subsequent work at HP Labs called Tycoon received the Horizon Award for Innovation. After working at Xerox PARC, Huberman became a Senior Fellow at HP Labs.

== Recent work and recognition ==
For several years, Dr. Huberman's research concentrated on the World Wide Web, with particular emphasis the dynamics of its growth and use. With members of his group he discovered a number of strong regularities, such as the dynamics that govern the growth of the web, and the laws that determine how users surf the web and create the observed congestion patterns.

Recently, Huberman was the Director of the Mechanisms and Design Lab at Hewlett Packard Labs where his work centers on the design of novel mechanisms for discovering and aggregating information in distributed systems as well as understanding the dynamics of information in large networks.

=== Awards and honors ===
- Fellow, American Association for the Advancement of Science
- Fellow, Japan Society for the Advancement of Science
- Fellow, American Physical Society
- CECOIA Prize on Economics and Artificial Intelligence
- IBM Prize of the Society for Computational Economics
- Trustee, Aspen Center for Physics
- Chairman, Council of Fellows at Xerox Corporation
