= Cinnabon =

American baked goods store chain

Cinnabon, Inc.

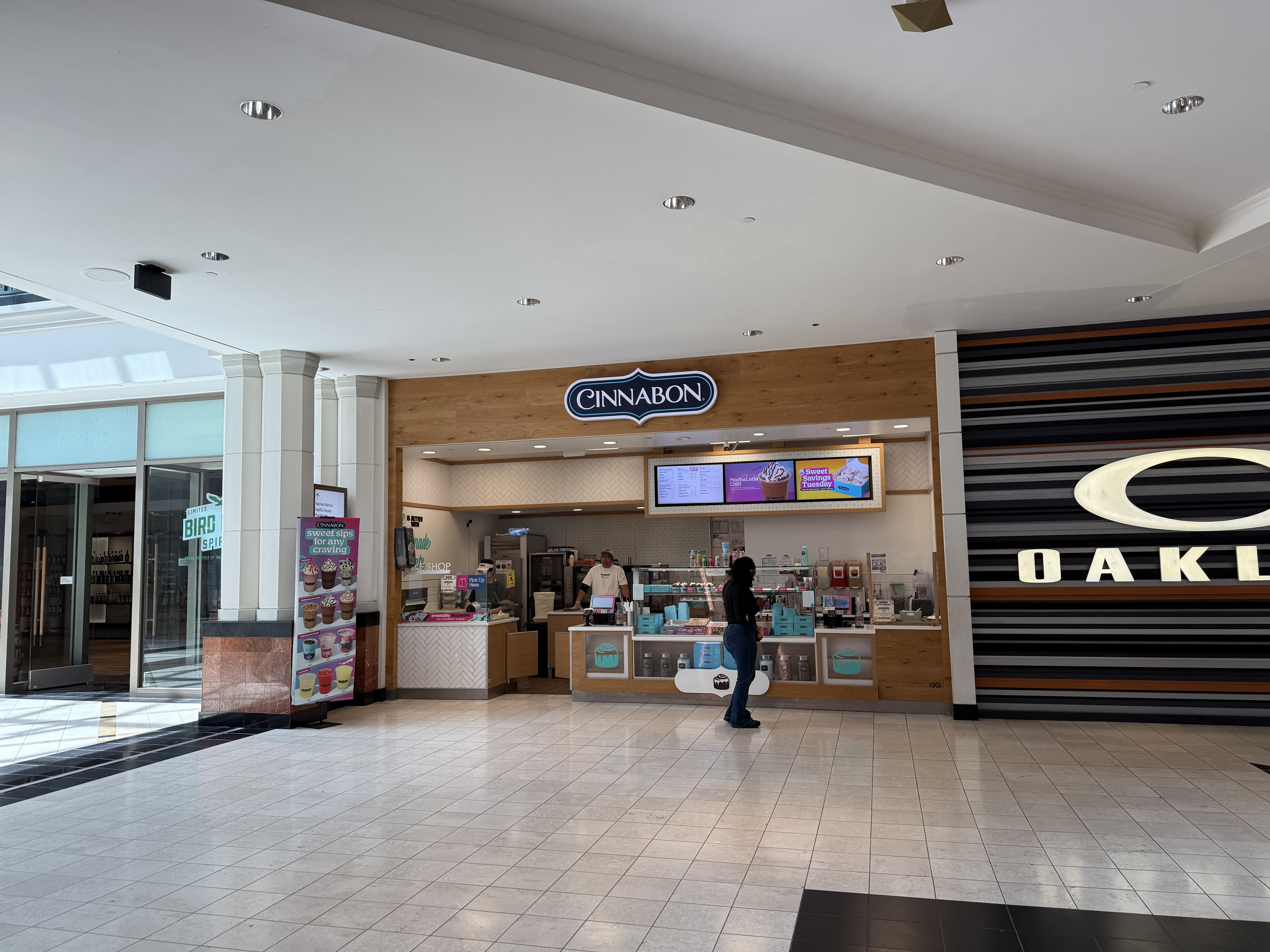
- Cinnabon at the King of Prussia Mall in King of Prussia, Pennsylvania
- Type: Subsidiary
- Industry: Restaurants Franchising
- Founded: 1985; 41 years ago in Federal Way, Washington
- Headquarters: Sandy Springs, Georgia, United States
- Area served: Worldwide
- Key people: Tracey Young (Chief Brand Officer)
- Products: Cinnamon rolls Coffee; Churros; Milkshakes
- Parent: AFC Enterprises (1998–2004); GoTo Foods (2004–present)
- Website: www.cinnabon.com

Cinnabon, Inc., is an American chain of baked goods stores and kiosks, normally found in areas with high pedestrian traffic, such as malls, airports and rest stops. The company's signature item is the cinnamon roll. As of December 2017, there were more than 1,200 Cinnabon bakeries operating in 48 countries. Its headquarters are in Sandy Springs, Georgia, United States.

The company is co-owned—with Schlotzsky's, Carvel, Moe's Southwest Grill, McAlister's Deli, Jamba, and Auntie Anne's brands—by GoTo Foods (formerly Focus Brands), an affiliate of private equity firm Roark Capital Group, based in Sandy Springs and operating over 5,000 stores.

== History ==
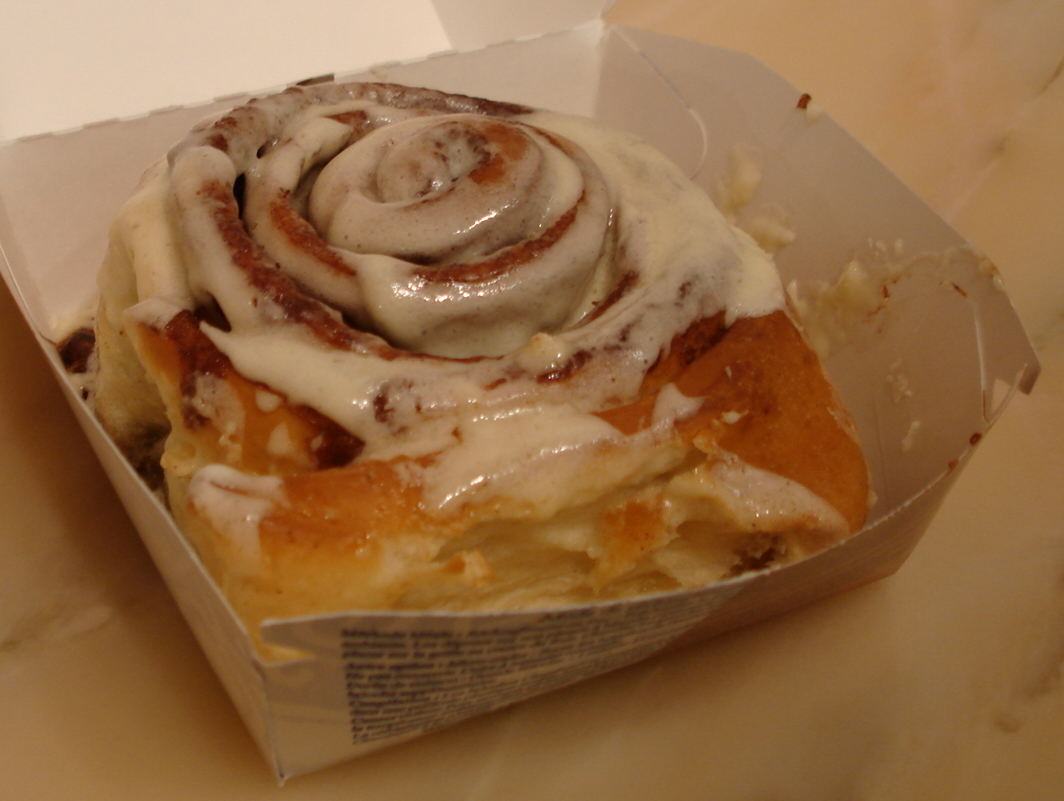
A Cinnabon cinnamon roll in a to-go box

The idea for Cinnabon emerged in 1985 after Rich Komen, majority owner of Restaurants Unlimited, observed the commercial success of T.J. Cinnamons, a bakery based in Kansas City, Missouri, that specialized in cinnamon rolls. T.J. Cinnamon's popularity prompted Komen to explore the possibility of franchising the concept on the West Coast. Komen attempted to negotiate franchising rights for T.J. Cinnamon's but was unable to secure an agreement granting exclusive rights for the region. He then explored a partnership with Mrs. Powell's, a bakery in Idaho Falls, Idaho, also known for its cinnamon rolls, but this effort too failed to result in a franchise agreement.

Having already secured a lease for a retail space in SeaTac Mall in Federal Way, Washington, Komen and Ray Lindstrom, the then Restaurants Unlimited CEO, proceeded to develop an original bakery concept. To create their signature product, they collaborated with Jerilyn Brusseau, a baker from Seattle, who was tasked with developing a cinnamon roll recipe. The first Cinnabon bakery opened on December 4, 1985, in SeaTac Mall, now called The Commons at Federal Way. Cinnabon's original business strategy emphasized a specialized focus on its signature product, cinnamon rolls, which were prominently branded as "World Famous Cinnamon Rolls" and became central to the company's brand identity.

Cinnabon's first franchise-operated store opened in August 1986 just outside of Philadelphia at the King of Prussia Mall. Cinnabon stores today can also be found in gas stations, universities, rapid transit stations, casinos, and amusement parks.

Cinnabon was bought by AFC Enterprises, Inc. in 1998 for $65 million. In 2004, AFC Enterprises, Inc., sold Cinnabon for $30.3 million to Focus Brands, Inc., which is owned by the Atlanta-based private equity firm Roark Capital Group. The headquarters moved to Greater Atlanta in 1999. In November 2020, British retail group EG Group announced a partnership with Cinnabon to open 150 branded stores in the UK over five years. In May 2024, the UK partnership would then be transferred to EG On The Move.

On October 8, 2018, Cinnabon partnered with Pizza Hut to release mini cinnamon rolls labeled "Cinnabon Mini Rolls" in Pizza Hut (also known as MiniBons outside of Pizza Hut). These cinnamon rolls continue to be available at Pizza Hut. In 2020, Pizza Hut brought back the Triple Treat Box, containing two medium one-topping pizzas, five breadsticks, and ten Cinnabon Mini Rolls.

== International locations ==
Distribution of Cinnabon locations around the world Countries with current Cinnabon locations Countries with former Cinnabon locations

=== Current locations ===
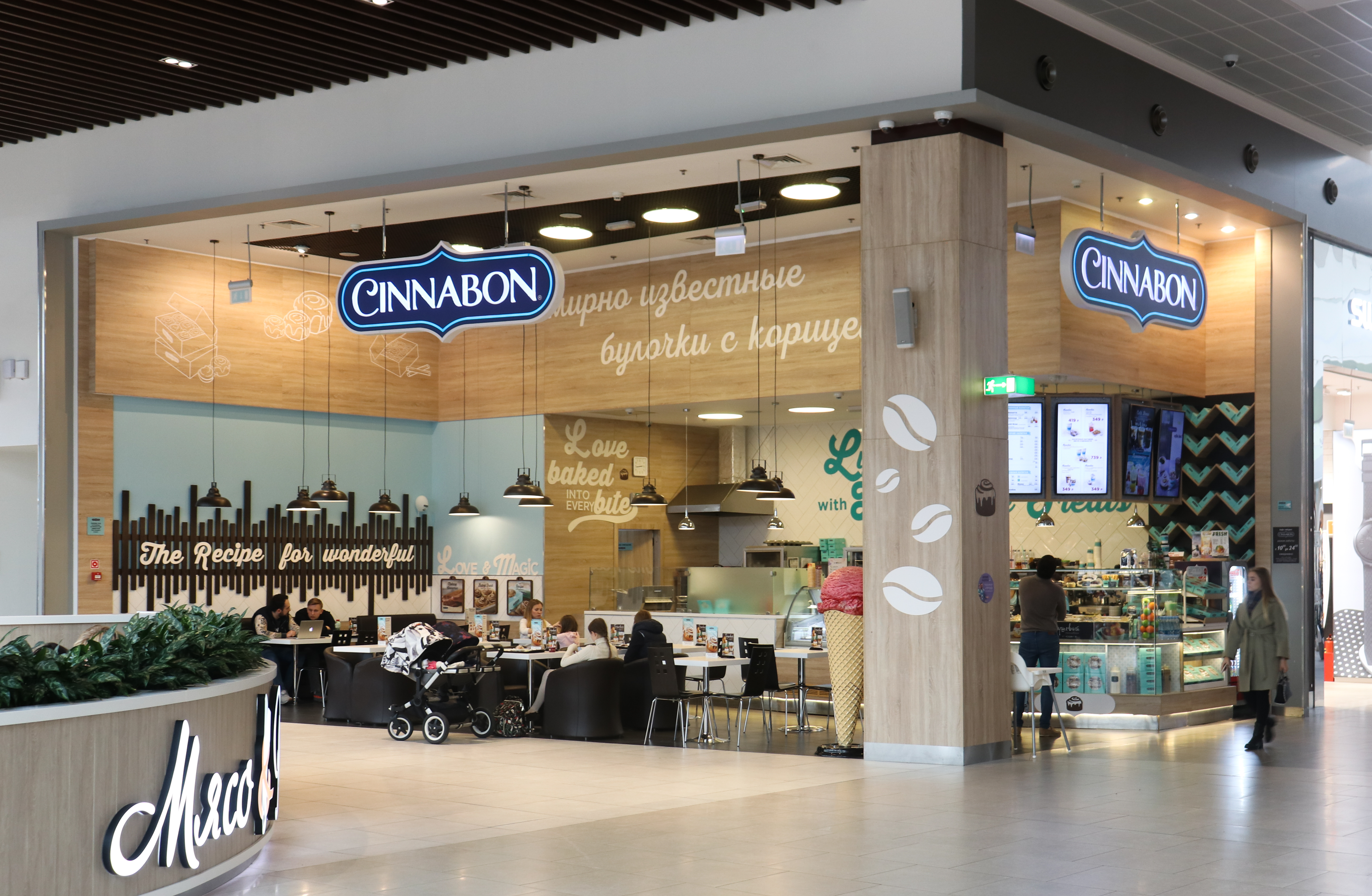
Cinnabon mall bakery location in Moscow, Russia (2019)

Cinnabon has franchise operations in 50 countries

Other Cinnabon locations
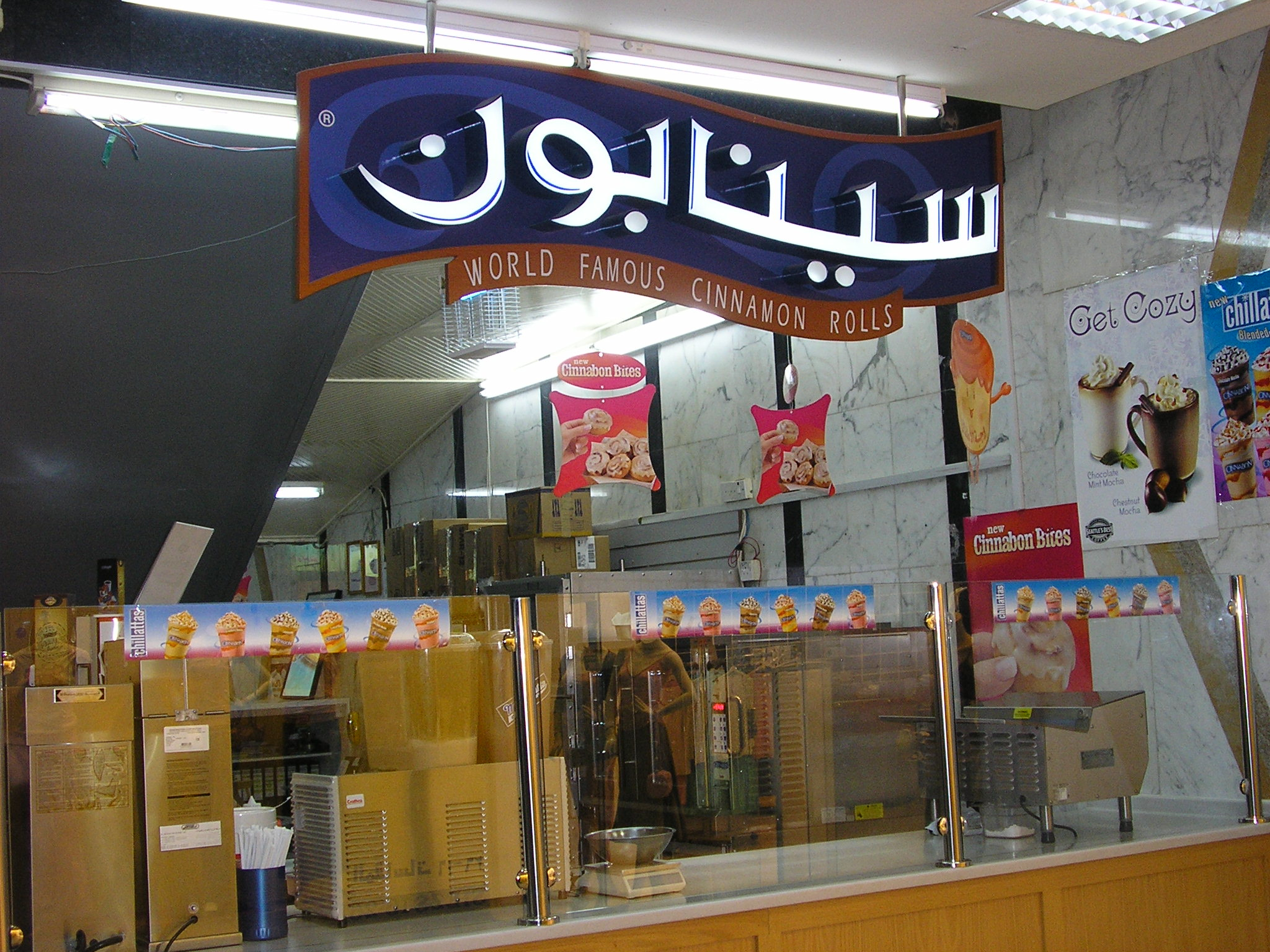
Cinnabon (sīnābūn) in Saudi Arabia

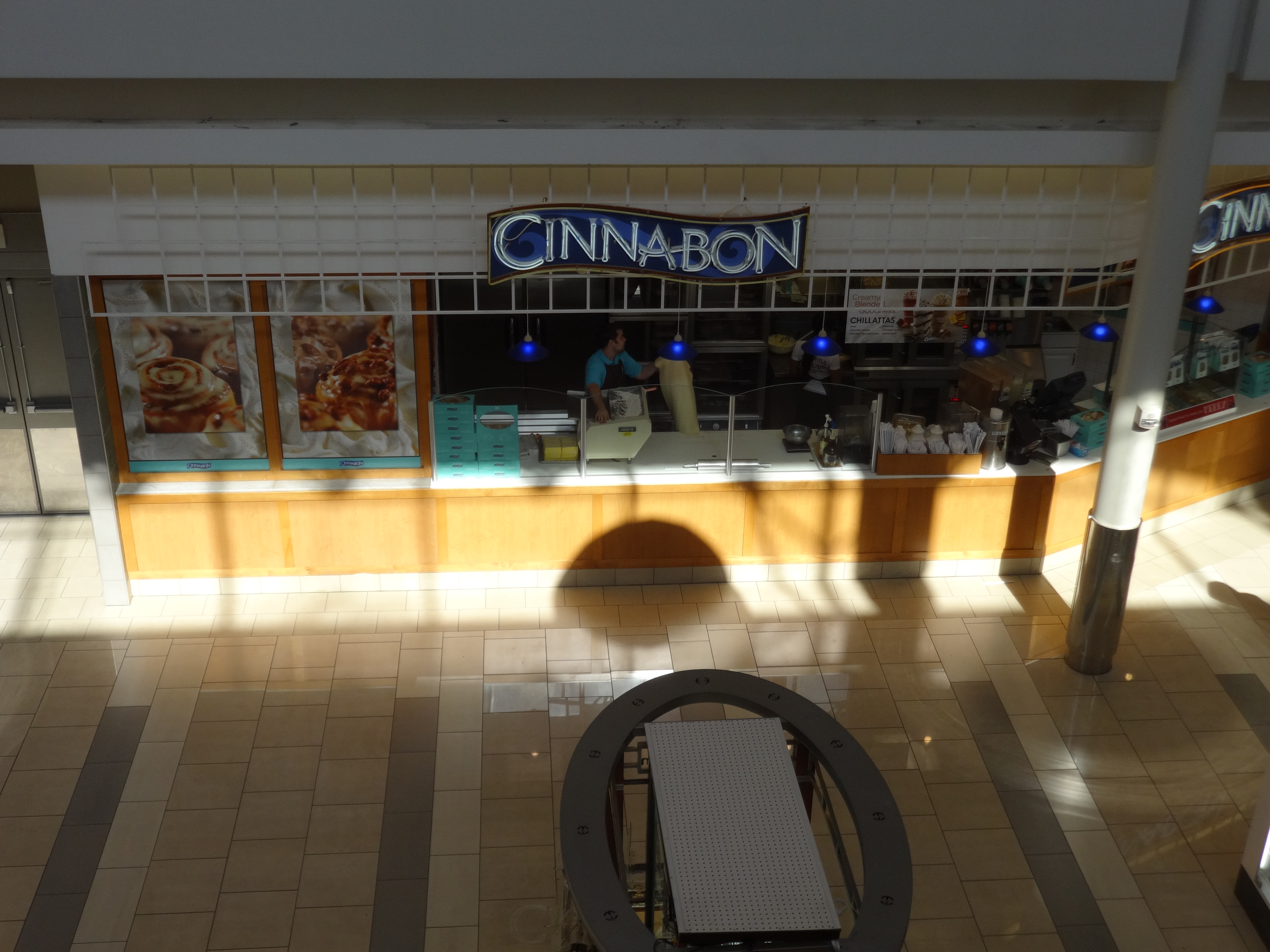
Cinnabon at Governor's Square Mall, Tallahassee, Florida

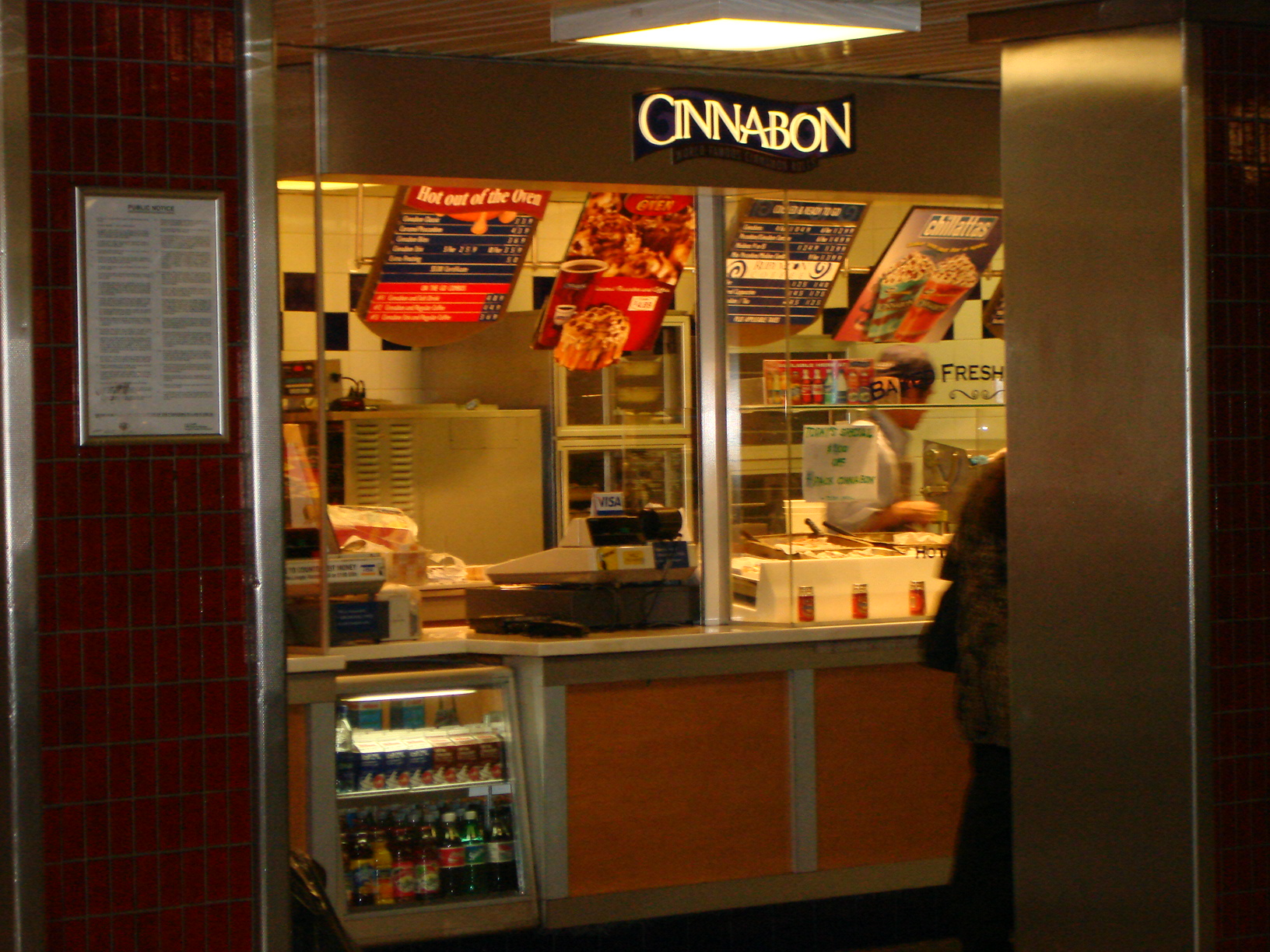
Cinnabon store in Toronto, Ontario, Canada

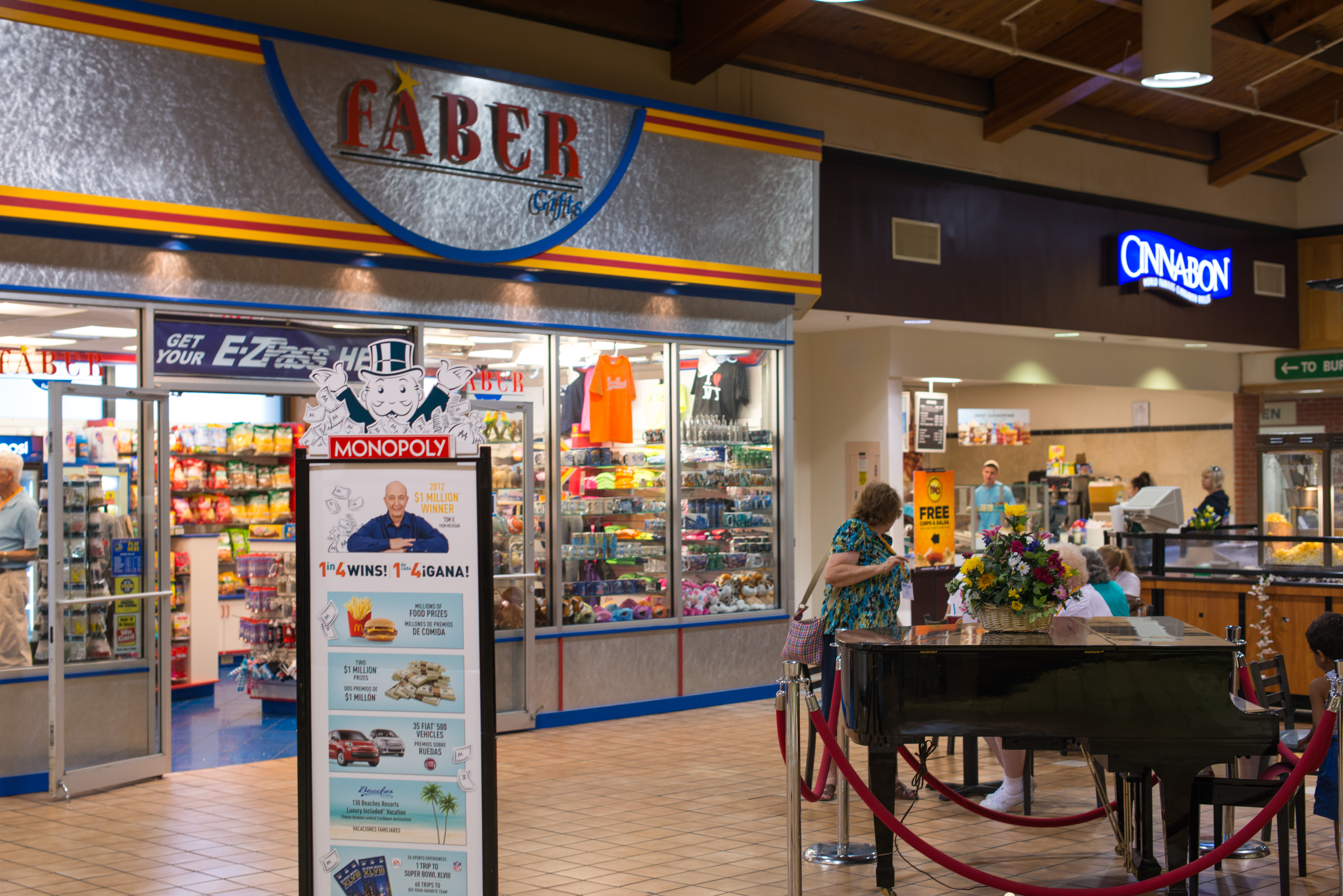
A Cinnabon store (right) at the Angola Travel Plaza on the New York Thruway, Angola, New York

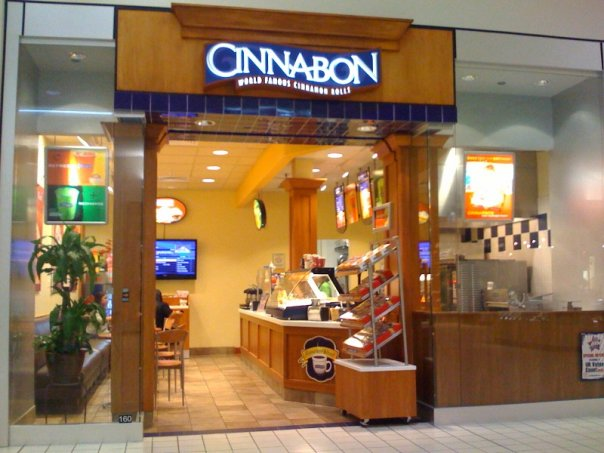
A Cinnabon store at West Valley Mall in Tracy, California

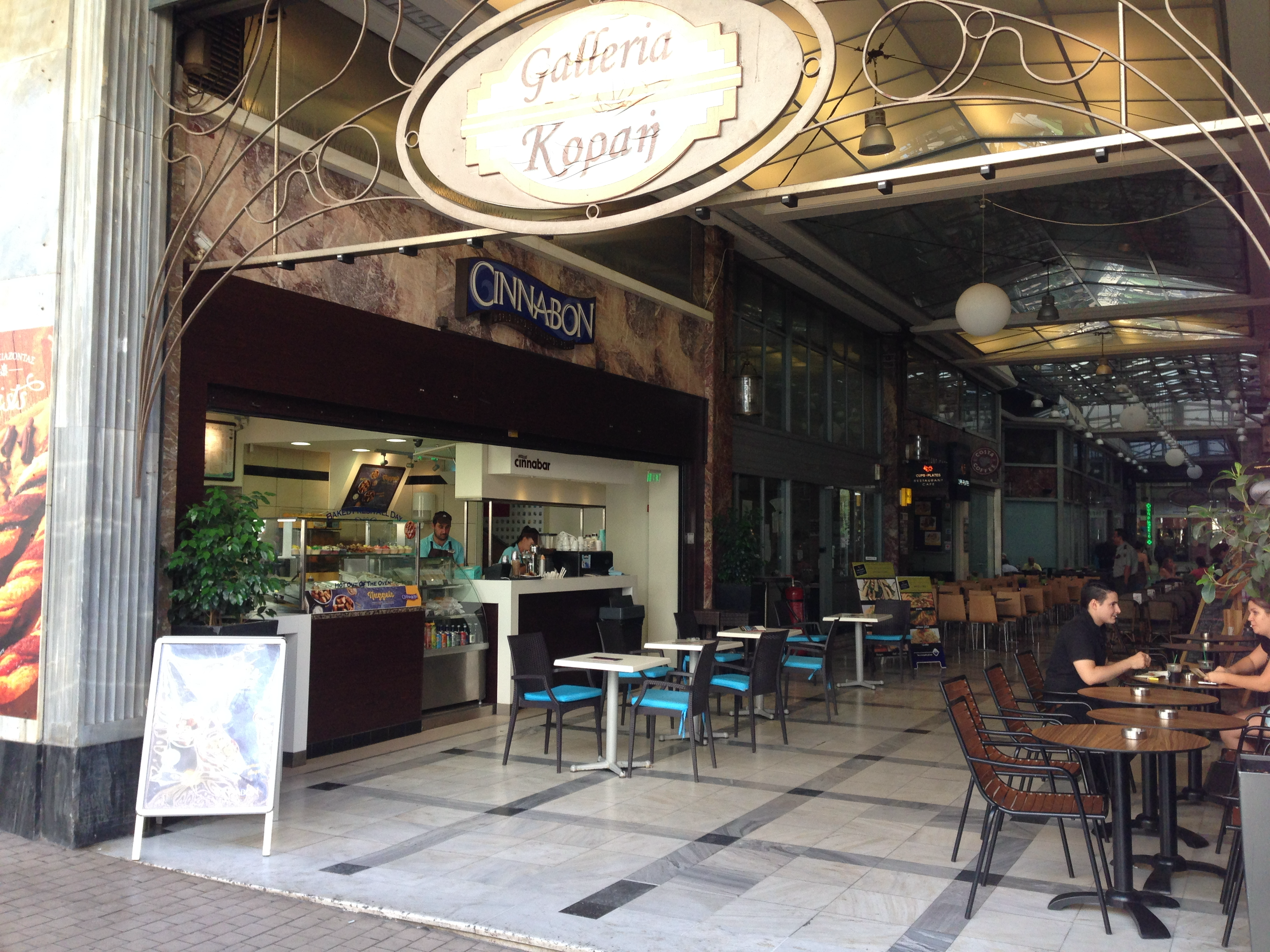
Cinnabon at the Stoa Korai Arcade Mall in Athens, Greece

A Cinnabon outlet in Angeles City, Philippines

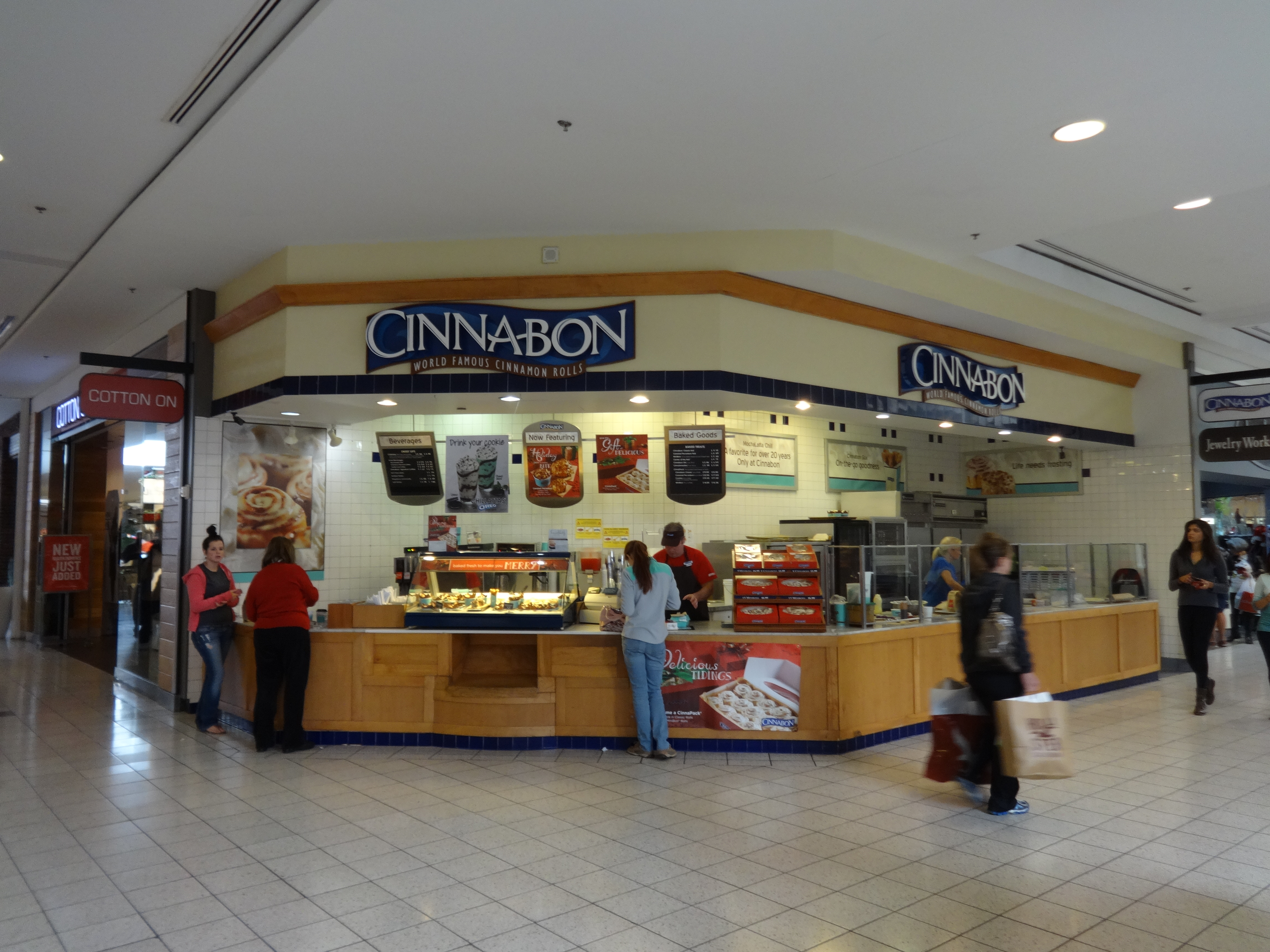
Cinnabon location at The Oaks Mall in Gainesville, Florida

== In popular culture ==
- In each season open of Better Call Saul, as well as in season 6, a mustachioed, glasses-wearing Saul Goodman is seen in flash-forward sequences working as a manager at Cinnabon inside a shopping mall in Omaha, Nebraska under the name "Gene Takavic".
- The restaurant and its president, Kat Cole, were featured in a 2012 episode of Undercover Boss.
- Cinnabon is mentioned in the Brooklyn 99 episode "Halloween IV", where Captain Raymond Holt refers to it as “See-nay-bone”.

== See also ==
- List of bakery cafés
