= Restaurants Unlimited Inc =

American food and beverage firm

Restaurants Unlimited, Inc. (RUI) was an American food and beverage firm. Rich Komen founded the company in 1969, and it was headquartered in Seattle, Washington, United States.

Brands included Skates on the Bay, Portland City Grill, Manzana Grill, Palisade, Cutters Crabhouse, Stanford's, Henry's Tavern, Kincaid's, Palomino Restaurant & Bar and Portland Seafood Company.

Restaurants Unlimited filed for Chapter 11 bankruptcy on July 7, 2019. At the time of filing, there were 35 locations owned by the firm across six states.

== History ==
In 2007, Sun Capital Partners acquired Restaurants Unlimited for an unspecified amount.

In July 2015, Jim Eschweiler was named president and CEO.

In 2018, Unlimited began adding a 1% “Living Wage Fee” to their customer's bill.

On July 7, 2019 the firm filed for Chapter 11 bankruptcy protection.

In September 2019, Landry's, Inc. purchased the firm.
