= David Berson =

American medical academic

- Education: Brown University, Massachusetts Institute of Technology
- Known for: Intrinsically photosensitive retinal ganglion cells
- Scientific career
- Fields: Neuroscience
- Workplaces: Brown University

David M. Berson is an American neuroscientist and a Sidney A. Fox and Dorothea Doctors Fox Professor of Ophthalmology and Visual Science at Brown University. Berson's research focuses on the structural and functional output of retinal ganglion cells.

== Education ==
Berson received his undergraduate degree from Brown University, graduating magna cum laude with an A.B. in psychology. He went on to earn his PhD in Neuroanatomy from Massachusetts Institute of Technology in 1980.
