= Schlotzsky's =

American restaurant franchise chain

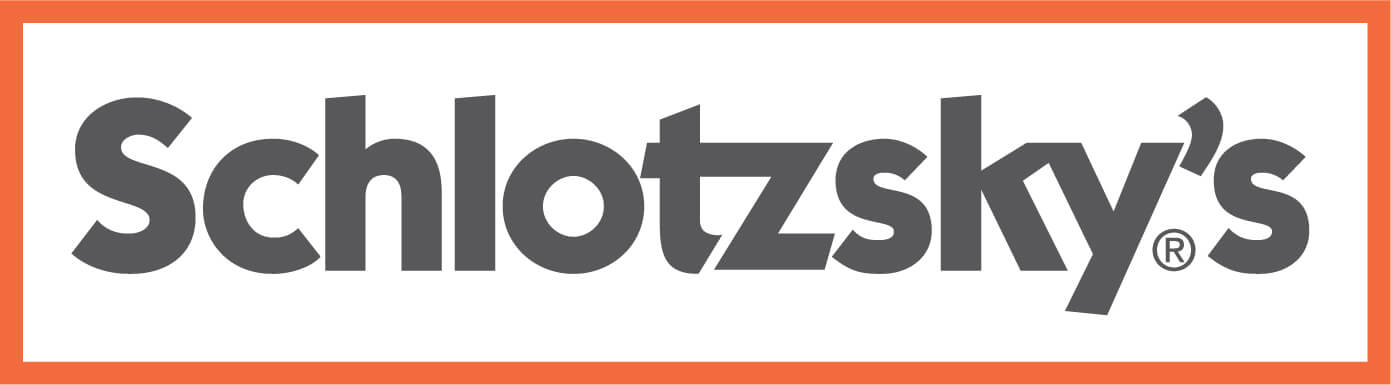

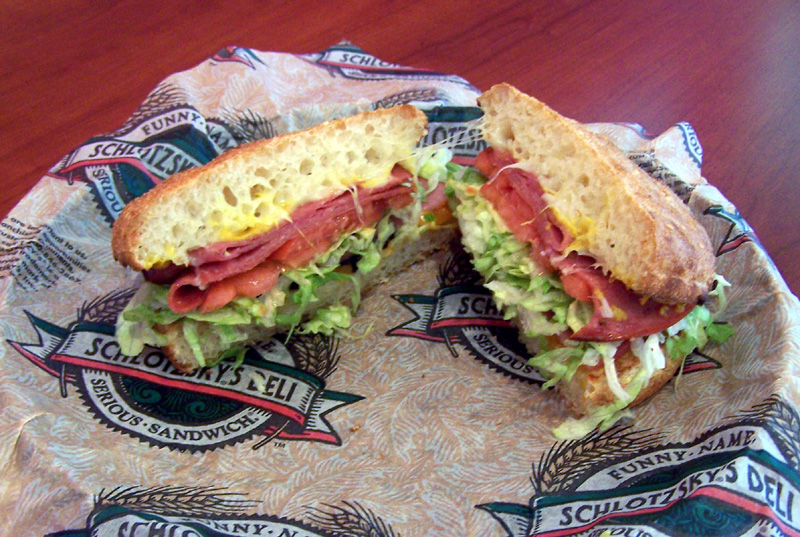
- "The Original", Schlotzsky's signature sandwich
- Company type: Subsidiary
- Industry: Restaurants
- Genre: Fast food
- Founded: 1971; 55 years ago in Austin, Texas, U.S.
- Founders: Don and Dolores Dissman
- Headquarters: 200 Glenridge Point Parkway, Suite 200, Atlanta, Georgia, U.S.
- Number of locations: 310+
- Area served: United States
- Key people: William Armstrong (president); Megan Thomas (VPM); Randy Hayworth (VPO)
- Products: Sandwiches, pizzas, salads, calzones, soups
- Parent: GoTo Foods
- Website: schlotzskys.com

Schlotzsky's is an American franchise chain of restaurants, specializing in sandwiches and pizza. The company is headquartered in Atlanta, Georgia. Schlotzsky's has over 310 franchised and company-owned locations throughout the United States. Most locations are in the south and southwestern United States, but the company is expanding into areas across the country, particularly the north and southeast.

On November 21, 2006, Schlotzsky's was acquired by Focus Brands, which on February 21, 2024, rebranded to GoTo Foods.

== History ==
In 1971, Don and Dolores Dissman founded the company in a "small, hole-in-the-wall shop" in Austin, Texas, on South Congress. The initial menu consisted of one sandwich, called "The Original," consisting of mixed meats, cheeses and black olives on a freshly made, toasted bun." It was based on the muffuletta sandwich. In 1981, the company had 100 franchise stores when real estate investors, John and Jeff Wooley and Gary Bradley, purchased the company for less than $3 million. Bradley split with the Wooleys in 1982, with Bradley taking the real estate business while the Wooleys kept the chain.

The Wooleys expanded Schlotzsky's menu to include specialty pizzas, toasted wraps, salads, soups, and other items. The Wooleys also took the company public on 15 December 1995, trading as BUNZ on NASDAQ.

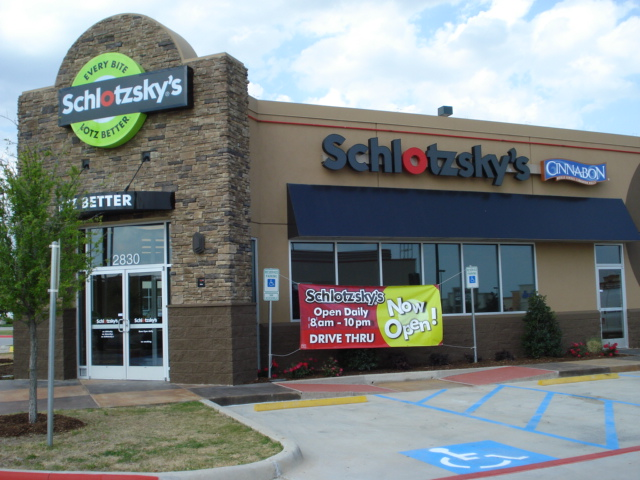
A Schlotzsky's franchise in Euless, Texas

The chain peaked in 2001 with 759 stores and over $400 million in sales, when same-store sales began to plateau. 2003 saw the company posting an $11.7 million loss; as a result, the Schlotzsky's board of directors relieved the Wooley brothers of day-to-day management on 17 June 2004 and named Sam Coats as the new chief executive officer of the company. The Wooleys eventually resigned from the board in July 2004.

On August 3, 2004, Schlotzsky's filed for voluntary Chapter 11 protection in U.S. Bankruptcy Court in San Antonio, Texas, reporting liabilities of approximately $71.3 million and assets of approximately $111.7 million.

The company ceased public trading when Bobby Cox Companies acquired Schlotzsky's assets out of bankruptcy. Under new ownership and management, Schlotzsky's spent two years strengthening its franchise operations and restructuring the brand. The new owner operated the business under the corporate entity Schlotzsky's, Ltd., and began streamlining the menu. Schlotzsky's strengthened franchise operations and licensed new franchisees in Texas and other states. The company also planned to open several new corporate-owned stores.

On 21 November 2006, Schlotzsky's was acquired by Focus Brands, an affiliate of private equity firm Roark Capital Group, parent company of Moe's Southwest Grill, Carvel, Cinnabon and Auntie Anne's. The following year, the company named Kelly Roddy as president, who joined Schlotzsky's from H-E-B Grocery Company. With Kelly on board, Schlotzsky's planned for growth and a system-wide reimage, which included updated restaurants, improved menus, table service, and the addition of Cinnabon. The company remodeled locations across the country with a "Lotz Better" look, which included bright, bold colors, circle-themed furniture and decor and playful slogans.

== Slogan ==
The current slogan is "It's a mouthful", launched in 2021. Former slogans include "All 'Round, Lotz Better", "Lotz Better", "Every Bite Lotz Better", "Funny name. Serious sandwich", "No substituteskys", and "Just one sandwich, it's that good."

== See also ==
- List of submarine sandwich restaurants
