= Moe's Southwest Grill =

Fast casual chain of Mexican restaurants

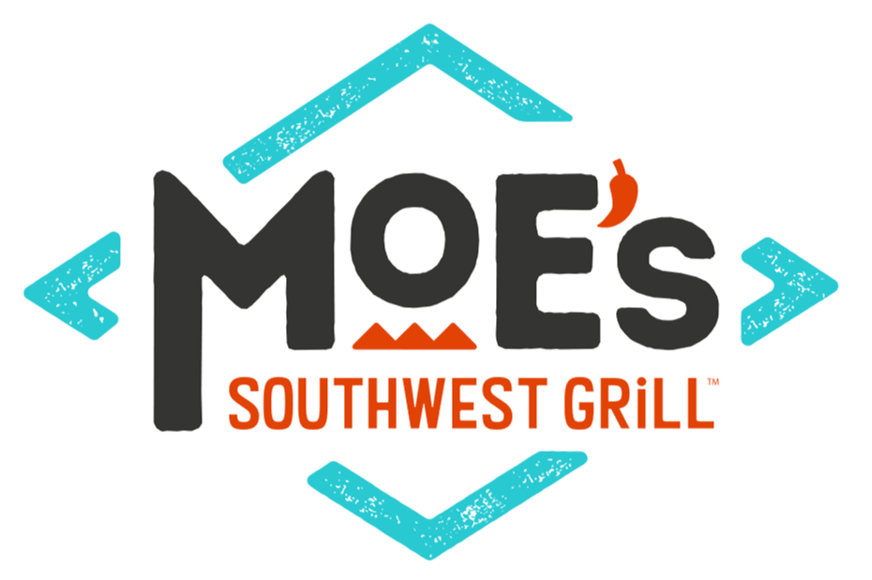
- Company type: Subsidiary
- Industry: Restaurants
- Genre: Fast Casual
- Founded: December 9, 2000; 25 years ago in Garden Hills, Georgia (Atlanta)
- Headquarters: Atlanta, Georgia, U.S.
- Number of locations: 600+ (2024)
- Area served: United States
- Key people: Tory Bartlett (Chief Brand Officer)
- Products: Mexican style cuisine and other Southwestern fare
- Parent: GoTo Foods
- Website: www.moes.com

Moe's Southwest Grill, referred to informally as Moe's, is an American fast casual restaurant franchise chain that was founded in Atlanta, Georgia, on December 9, 2000, by Raving Brands. The name "Moe's" originated as an acronym for "Musicians, Outlaws and Entertainers", and this theme led to the music-related artwork found in the original design.

Moe's Southwest Grill—together with Schlotzsky's, Carvel, Cinnabon, McAlister's Deli, Jamba and Auntie Anne's brands—is part of the GoTo Foods portfolio of brands. GoTo is an affiliate of the Roark Capital Group.

The restaurant chain originally featured artwork depicting deceased music legends and licensed a special rock soundtrack from Muzak that consisted of music from deceased musicians or bands with a notable deceased musician. After a lawsuit from the estate of Jerry Garcia, depictions of actual people were removed from the decor. The menu, which initially featured puns based on people and popular phrases from music, television, and movies was revamped to remove nearly all phrases that may result in legal issues.

== Fare ==
Moe's offers various types of food on its menu, including burritos, tacos, quesadillas, nachos, salads, stacks, burrito bowls, and house-made seasonal salsas. Ingredients can be added or subtracted from the standard entree for customization. Every order comes with chips and salsa on the side.

== International locations ==
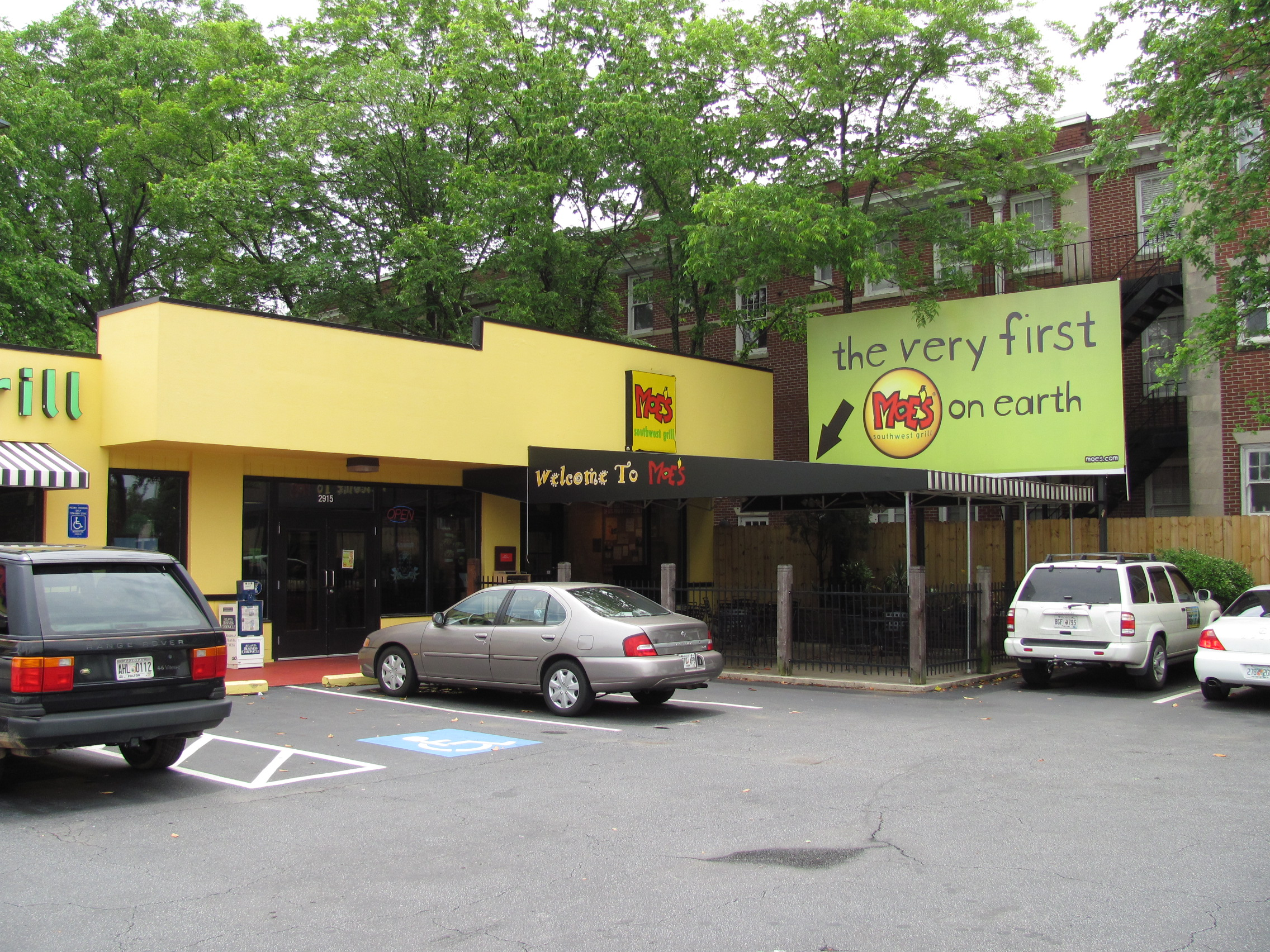
Garden Hills location ("the very first Moe's on earth")

In 2010, Moe's signed a deal to open 40 of its restaurants in Turkey, the first of which opened in 2011.

In September 2012, Moe's opened its first Russian franchise located in the center of Moscow near the Kremlin on Pyatnitskaya Street.

Franchise partners also existed in Costa Rica and Jamaica.
