= GoTo Foods =

American private equity firm

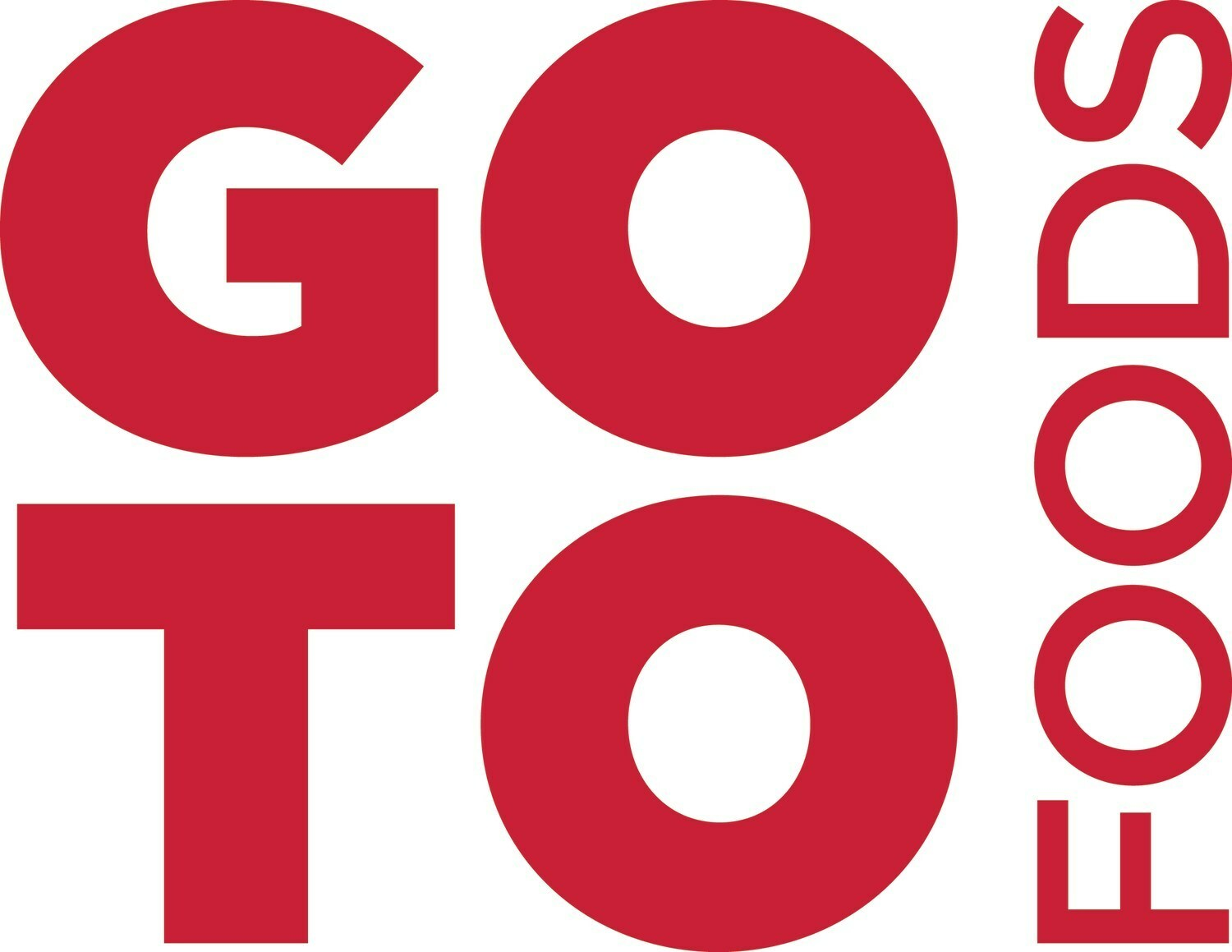
- Type: Private
- Industry: Restaurants
- Founded: 2001; 25 years ago
- Headquarters: Sandy Springs, Georgia, United States
- Number of locations: 6,700 (2024)
- Key people: Omer Gajial (CEO); Brett Ubl (CFO); Michael Barrett (CAO); Guillermo Cremer (CPO); Sarah Powell (General Counsel & Secretary); Steven Roach (CIO); Brian Krause (CDO)
- Owner: Roark Capital Group
- Subsidiaries: Auntie Anne's; Carvel; Cinnabon; Jamba; McAlister's Deli; Moe's Southwest Grill; Schlotzsky's
- Website: www.gotofoods.com

GoTo Foods (formerly Focus Brands) is an American company that currently owns the Schlotzsky's, Carvel, Cinnabon, Moe's Southwest Grill, McAlister's Deli, Auntie Anne's and Jamba brands. It is located in Sandy Springs, Georgia, and operates over 6,700 stores globally.

== History ==
Roark Capital Group, a private equity firm, acquired Carvel in 2001. It purchased Cinnabon and the international operations of Seattle's Best Coffee from AFC Enterprises in November 2004, combining the three brands under its Focus Brands affiliate. Focus Brands purchased Schlotzsky's from Bobby Cox Companies in 2006, less than two years after Bobby Cox had purchased the brand from bankruptcy.

On August 11, 2007, Focus Brands announced that it purchased the Moe's Southwest Grill brand from Raving Brands.

In October 2010, Focus Brands acquired the mostly mall-based franchiser Auntie Anne's, a maker of pretzels.

In June 2017, Kat Cole was named Chief Operating Officer.

On August 2, 2018, Focus Brands announced that it would acquire Frisco-based smoothie-maker Jamba, formerly known as Jamba Juice. The acquisition was completed on September 14, 2018.

In February 2020, Jim Holthouser was named Chief Executive Officer.

In February 2024, the company announced it was rebranding under the new name GoTo Foods.

In December 2025, Jim Holthouser was succeeded by Omer Gajial as CEO.

== See also ==
- Cinnabon Swirl
