= List of restaurant chains =

The following is a list of restaurant chains.

== International ==
Name	Known for	Parent company	First store location	Founded	Locations worldwide	Employees	Related restaurants
85°C Bakery Cafe	Baked goods		Taipei, Taiwan	2004	1000+		
Applebee's	American	DineEquity	Decatur, Georgia	1980	1830	31,500	
Arby's	Sandwiches	Inspire Brands	Boardman, Ohio	1964	3472	26,788	
Auntie Anne's	Baked goods	Focus Brands	Downingtown, Pennsylvania	1988	1500+	12,000	
Barista	Beverages		New Delhi, India	2000	315		
Baton Rouge	Steak	Imvescor	Montreal, Quebec	1992	29		
BeaverTails	Baked goods		Ottawa, Ontario	1978	119		
Big Smoke Burger	Hamburgers		Toronto, Ontario	2007	19		
Bonchon Chicken	Chicken	Bonchon Chicken Inc.	Busan, South Korea	2002	64		
Buffalo Wild Wings	Chicken	Inspire Brands	Columbus, Ohio	1981	1238		
Burger King	Hamburgers	Restaurant Brands International	Miami, Florida	1954	17796	34,248	Tim Hortons, Hungry Jack's
Cafe Coffee Day	Beverages	Coffee Day Enterprises	Bangalore, India	1993	1752	20,143	
Carl's Jr.	Hamburgers	CKE Restaurants	Anaheim, California	1956	1490	20,521	Hardee's
Charleys Philly Steaks	Sandwiches	Gosh Enterprises, Inc.	Columbus, Ohio	1986	600+	15,380	
Chatime	Beverages		Zhubei, Taiwan	2005	2500+		
Chick-fil-A	Chicken		Hapeville, Georgia	1946	2363		
Chili's	Mexican	Brinker International	Dallas, Texas	1975	1606	31,000	Maggiano's Little Italy
Chipotle Mexican Grill	Mexican	Chipotle Mexican Grill, Inc.	Denver, Colorado	1993	2500+	17,198	ShopHouse
Church's Chicken	Chicken	Friedman Fleischer & Lowe	San Antonio, Texas	1952	1009		
Cora	Breakfast		Montreal, Quebec	1987	130		
Costa Coffee	Beverages	The Coca-Cola Company	London, England	1971	3883		
Crepes & Waffles	Baked goods	Crêpes & Waffles S.A.	Bogotá, Colombia	1980	161		
Dairy Queen	Frozen desserts	Berkshire Hathaway	Joliet, Illinois	1940	6800+		
Délifrance	Baked goods	Grands Moulins de Paris		1983			
Denny's	Breakfast			1953	1700+		
Din Tai Fung	Asian		Taipei, Taiwan	1972			
Dindigul Thalappakatti	South Indian		Dindigul, Tamil Nadu	1957	101	2,800+	
Dôme	Beverages	Dôme Coffees Australia Pty Ltd	Cottesloe, Western Australia	1990	45	29,063	
Domino's Pizza	Pizza	Domino's Pizza, Inc.	Ypsilanti, Michigan	1960	16000+	28,735	
Dunkin' Donuts	Beverages	Inspire Brands	Quincy, Massachusetts	1950	11300+	15,000+	
Earls Kitchen + Bar	Hamburgers	Earls Restaurants Ltd.	Edmonton, Alberta	1982	64		
East Side Mario's	Italian	Prime Restaurants	Miami, Florida	1987	85		
Five Guys	Hamburgers		Arlington County, Virginia	1986	1500+		
Freshly Chopped	Salad		Dublin, Ireland	2012	60		
Gloria Jean's Coffees	Beverages			1979	750	10,205	
Hamburguesas El Corral	Hamburgers	Va! Group	Bogotá, Colombia	1983	193		
Hard Rock Cafe	American	Seminole Tribe of Florida	London, England	1971	185	7,901	
Hardee's	Hamburgers	CKE Restaurants	Greenville, North Carolina	1960	5812	25,700	Carl's Jr.
Harvey's	Hamburgers	Recipe Unlimited	Richmond Hill, Ontario	1959	274	7,000	
Hooters	American	TriArtisan Capital Advisors, Nord Bay Capital	Clearwater, Florida	1983	430+		Hooters, Inc. & Hooters of America, Inc.
IHOP	Breakfast	DineEquity	Burbank, California	1958	1822	32,300	
Jack Astor's Bar and Grill	American	Service Inspired Restaurants Corporation	St. Catharines, Ontario	1990	41	2,519	
Jack in the Box	Hamburgers	JANA Partners LLC	San Diego, California	1951	2246	22,000+	
Jimmy John's	Sandwiches	Inspire Brands	Charleston, Illinois	1983	2800+		
Joe & The Juice	Beverages		Copenhagen, Denmark	2002	312		
Jollibee	Asian	Jollibee Foods Corporation	Quezon City, Philippines	1975	743	29,216	Chowking, Greenwich Pizza, Red Ribbon
Juan Valdez Cafe	Beverages	Procafecol S.A.	Bogotá, Colombia	2002	200	5,000	Federación Nacional de Cafeteros de Colombia
The Keg	Steak		Vancouver, British Columbia	1971	156	9,917	
Kenny Rogers Roasters	Chicken	Nathan's Famous, Inc.		1991		10,400	Nathan's Famous, Miami Subs Pizza and Grill, Arthur Treacher's
KFC	Chicken	Yum! Brands	Corbin, Kentucky	1952	22621	43,682	Pizza Hut, Taco Bell
Krispy Kreme	Baked goods	Erlich, Inc	Winston-Salem, North Carolina	1937	1043	3,700	
Little Caesars	Pizza	Ilitch Holdings	Garden City, Michigan	1959	5463	23,001	
Long John Silver's	Seafood	LJS Partners LLC	Lexington, Kentucky	1969	8400+		
Louisa Coffee	Beverages		Taipei, Taiwan	2006	490+		
Loving Hut	Vegan		Taipei, Taiwan	2000	125		
Marrybrown	Chicken		Malaysia	1981	250	9,461	
McDonald's	Hamburgers	McDonald's Corporation	San Bernardino, California	1940	37855	210,000	
MK Restaurant	Asian		Bangkok, Thailand	1986	421		
MOS Burger	Hamburgers		Tokyo, Japan	1972		7,000	
Nando's	Chicken		Rosettenville, South Africa	1987		10,988	
Olive Garden	Italian	Darden Restaurants	Orlando, Florida	1982	892	24,663	Bahama Breeze, The Capital Grille, Eddie V's Prime Seafood, LongHorn Steakhouse, Red Lobster, Seasons 52
Outback Steakhouse	Steak	Bloomin' Brands, Inc.	Tampa, Florida	1988	1002	24,005	Bonefish Grill, Carrabba's Italian Grill, Fleming's Prime Steakhouse
Panda Express	Asian	Panda Restaurant Group	Rosemead, California	1983	2200+	25,000+	
Panera Bread	Sandwiches	Covelli Enterprises	Kirkwood, Missouri	1993	2000+	20,427	
Papa John's Pizza	Pizza	Papa John's International	Louisville, Kentucky	1984	5303	28,000	
Paris Baguette	Baked goods	Paris-Croissant Food Company	Seoul, South Korea	1986	3316		Caffè Pascucci
Perkins Restaurant and Bakery	Breakfast	Perkins & Marie Callender's Inc.	Cincinnati, Ohio	1958	324		
The Pizza Company	Pizza	Minor International	Bangkok, Thailand	1980	277		
Pizza Hut	Pizza	Yum! Brands	Wichita, Kansas	1958	18431	41,360	KFC, Taco Bell
PizzaExpress	Italian	Hony Capital	London, England	1965	386		
Planet Hollywood	Theme dining		Manhattan, New York	1991	7	8,199	
Pollo Campero	Chicken		Guatemala	1971	350	6,346	
Ponderosa and Bonanza Steakhouses	Steak	Homestyle Dining LLC	Plano, Texas	1965	148		
Popeyes	Chicken	Restaurant Brands International	Arabi, Louisiana	1972	3102	22,500	
Quiznos	Sandwiches	Quiznos LLC	Denver, Colorado	1978	800+	24,053	
Rainforest Cafe	American	Landry's, Inc.	Bloomington, Minnesota	1994	24	22,000	
Red Lobster	Seafood	Golden Gate Capital	Lakeland, Florida	1968	749	24,989	Bahama Breeze, The Capital Grille, Eddie V's Prime Seafood, LongHorn Steakhouse, Olive Garden, Seasons 52
Red Robin	Hamburgers		Seattle, Washington	1968	562		
Ruby Tuesday	American	Ruby Tuesday Inc.	Knoxville, Tennessee	1972	491	40,500	Lime Fresh Mexican Grill, Marlin & Ray's Seafood & Sunsets, Truffles Grill, Wok Hay
Saravana Bhavan	South Indian		Chennai, India	1981	109	8,700	
Secret Recipe			Malaysia	1997	100		
Shake Shack	Hamburgers	Leonard Green & Partners	New York City, United States	2004	403	6,101	
Shakey's Pizza	Pizza	Hunt International	Sacramento, California	1954	558	10,001	
Sizzler	Steak	Sizzler Restaurants	Culver City, California	1958	270	9,951	Pat and Oscar's
Sonic Drive-In	Hamburgers	Inspire Brands	Shawnee, Oklahoma	1953	3582	9,200+	
Starbucks	Beverages	Starbucks	Seattle, Washington	1971	28218	58,429	Seattle's Best Coffee
Steak 'n Shake	Hamburgers	The Steak 'n Shake Company	Normal, Illinois	1934	628	10,001	
Subway	Sandwiches	Doctor's Associates Inc.	Bridgeport, Connecticut	1965	41512	104,719	Sunset Boulevard
Swensen's	Frozen desserts	International Franchise Corp	San Francisco, California	1948		20,630	Yogen Früz, I Can't Believe It's Yogurt (ICBY), Golden Swirl, Bresler's ice cream
Taco Bell	Mexican	Yum! Brands	Downey, California	1962	7072	41,367	KFC, Pizza Hut
Tata Starbucks	Beverages	Starbucks and Tata	Mumbai, Maharashtra	2012	300	2,000	
Telepizza	Pizza		Madrid, Spain	1988	1150	9,555	
TGI Fridays	American	Carlson Companies	New York, New York	1965	870	25,000	
Tim Hortons	Beverages	Restaurant Brands International	Hamilton, Ontario	1964	4846	100,000	
TKK Fried Chicken	Chicken		Taipei, Taiwan	1974	80+		
Tony Roma's	Steak		Miami, Florida	1972	150+	10,466	
Waffle House	Breakfast		Avondale Estates, Georgia	1955	2100		
Wendy's	Hamburgers	The Wendy's Company	Columbus, Ohio	1969	6711	42,157	
Whataburger	Hamburgers	Whataburger	Corpus Christi, Texas	1950	824	40,000+	
White Castle	Hamburgers	White Castle Systems, Inc	Columbus, Ohio	1921	377	12,000	
Yoshinoya	Asian		Tokyo, Japan	1899	1300	9,248	

== Argentina ==
- California Burrito Co.
- Mostaza

== Bangladesh ==
- Holey Artisan Bakery
- Star Kabab

== Brazil ==
- Fogo de Chão
- Habib's
- Kharina Steakhouse

== Costa Rica ==
- Rostipollos

== Denmark ==
- Jensen's Bøfhus

== Egypt ==
- Cook Door

== Finland ==
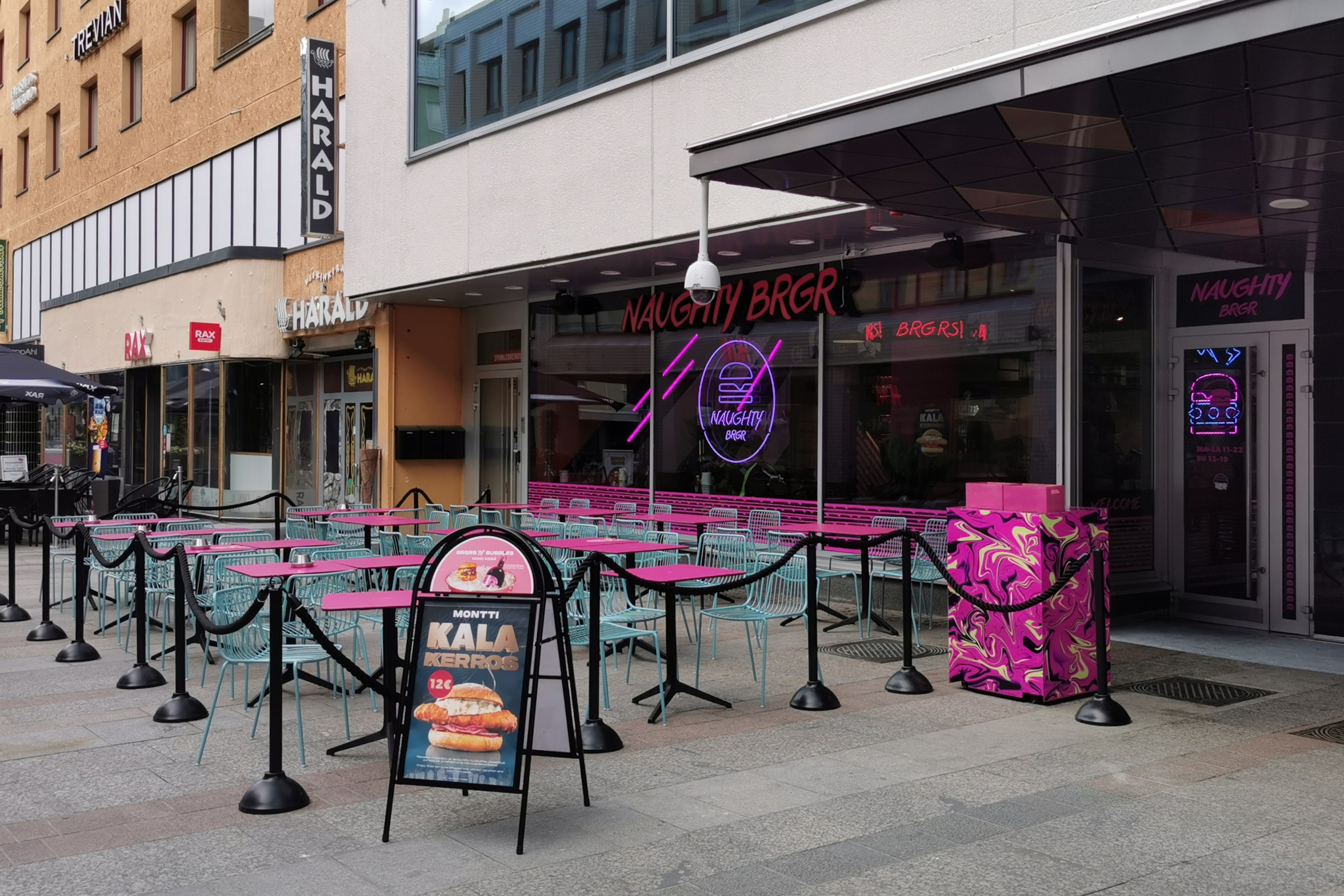
Outdoor restaurant area of the Naughty Brgr restaurant in Oulu

- Friends & Brgrs
- Hesburger
- Kotipizza
- Pancho Villa
- Rolls
- Rosso
- Siipiweikot

== France ==
- Bel Canto
- Brioche Dorée
- Buffalo Grill
- Flunch
- Hippopotamus
- Pomme de pain
- Quick

== Germany ==
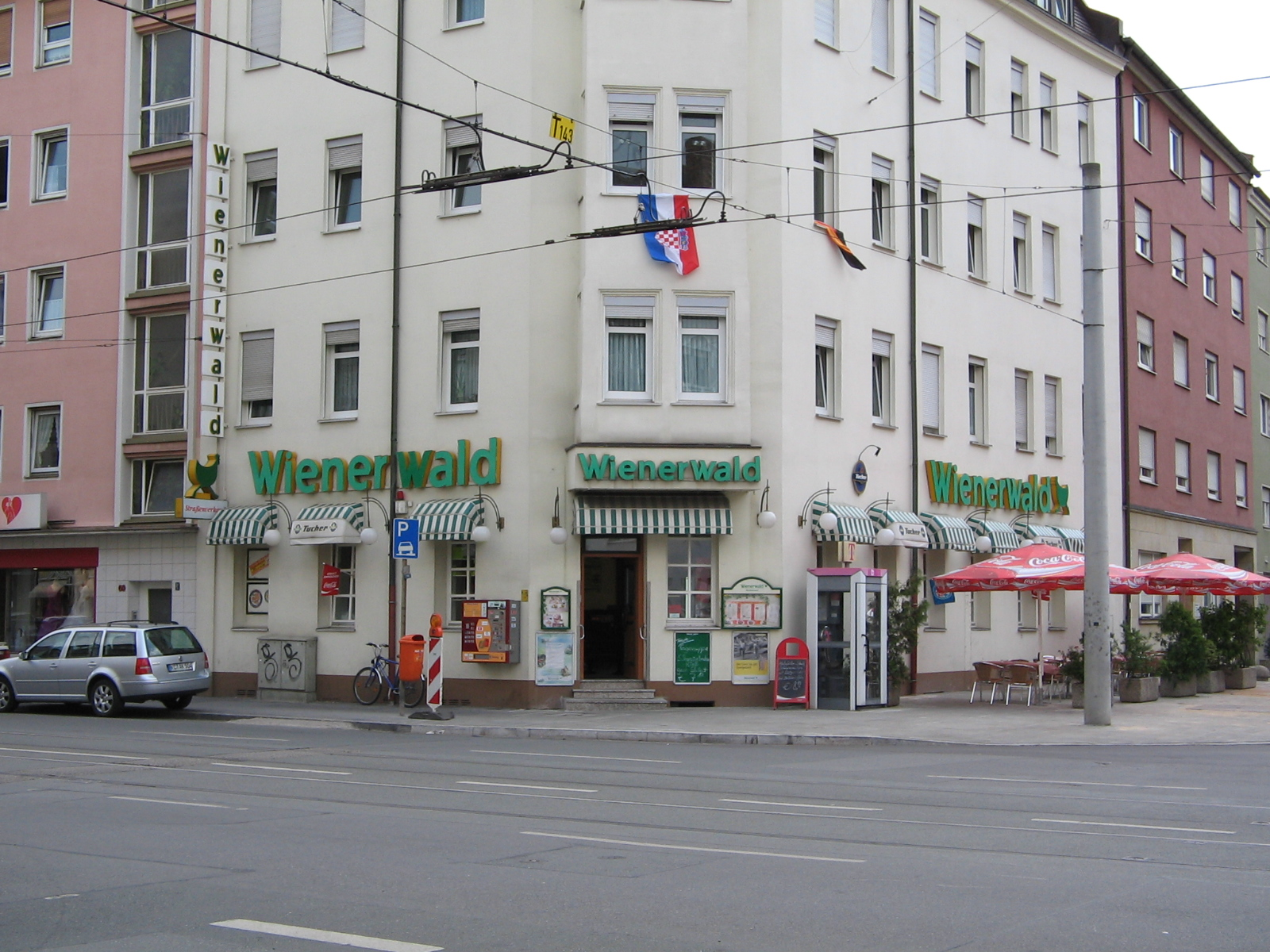
A Wienerwald restaurant in Nuremberg, Germany

- Kochlöffel
- Nordsee
- Vapiano
- Wienerwald

== Greece ==
- Goody's

== Hong Kong ==
- Café de Coral

== India ==
- Adyar Ananda Bhavan
- Annapoorna Gowrishankar
- Bikanervala
- Goli Vada Pav
- Haldiram's
- Indian Coffee House
- Moshe's
- Murugan Idli Shop
- Namma Veedu Vasanta Bhavan
- Saravana Bhavan

== Indonesia ==
- Bakmi GM
- CFC
- D'Cost
- Es Teler 77
- Geprek Bensu
- HokBen
- J.CO Donuts & Coffee
- Kebab Turki Baba Rafi
- Mie Gacoan
- Naughty Nuri's
- Restoran Sederhana
- Richeese Factory
- Solaria

== Israel ==
- Burgeranch

== Italy ==
- Hamerica's
- Spizzico

== Japan ==
- Anna Miller's
- Gyoza no Ohsho
- Ippudo
- Kura
- Ringer Hut
- Saizeriya
- Sukiya

== South Korea ==
- Angel In Us Coffee
- Bonchon Chicken
- The Coffee Bean
- Kyochon Chicken
- Lotteria
- Paris Baguette
- Tom and Toms Coffee
- Tous Les Jours

== Lebanon ==
- Zaatar w Zeit

== Malaysia ==
- Big Apple Donuts and Coffee
- The Chicken Rice Shop
- Kenny Rogers Roasters
- Sushi King
- Borenos Fried Chicken
- KLG
- Marrybrown
- OldTown White Coffee
- Kedai Mee Celup Cik Yue
- Pelita Nasi Kandar
- Ramly
- Rotiboy
- Sate Kajang Haji Samuri
- SCR
- Pak Mat Western
- Secret Recipe
- NZ Curry House

== Mexico ==
- Benedetti's Pizza
- Carlos'n Charlie's
- Peter Piper Pizza
- El Pollo Loco
- Sanborns Cafe
- Señor Frog's
- Sirloin Stockade
- Vips

== Netherlands ==
- FEBO
- La Place
- Nam Kee

== Nigeria ==
- Cafè Neo
- Chicken Republic
- Kilimanjaro
- Mama Cass
- Mr Bigg's
- Tantalizers

== Norway ==
- Big Bite
- Egon
- Peppes Pizza

== Puerto Rico ==
- Martin's BBQ

== Russia ==
- Teremok
- Dodo Pizza
- Vkusno i tochka (formerly McDonald's)

== South Africa ==
- Chicken Licken
- Nando's
- Spur Steak Ranches
- Steers
- Wimpy

== Spain ==
- Cervecería 100 Montaditos
- Foster's Hollywood
- Rodilla
- Telepizza

== Sweden ==
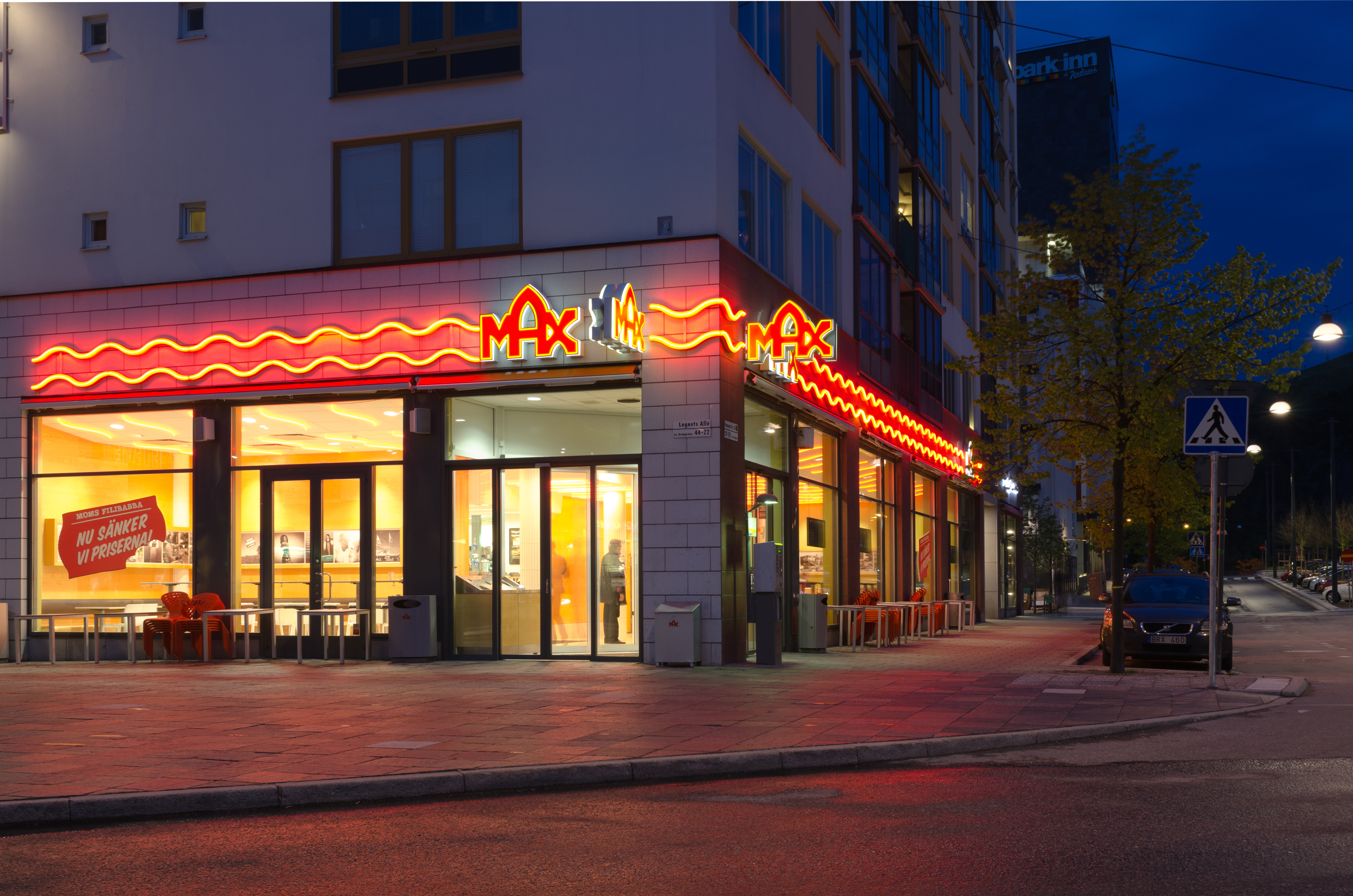
A Max Hamburgers restaurant

- Max Hamburgers
- Mister York

== Switzerland ==
- Hiltl Restaurant

== Taiwan ==
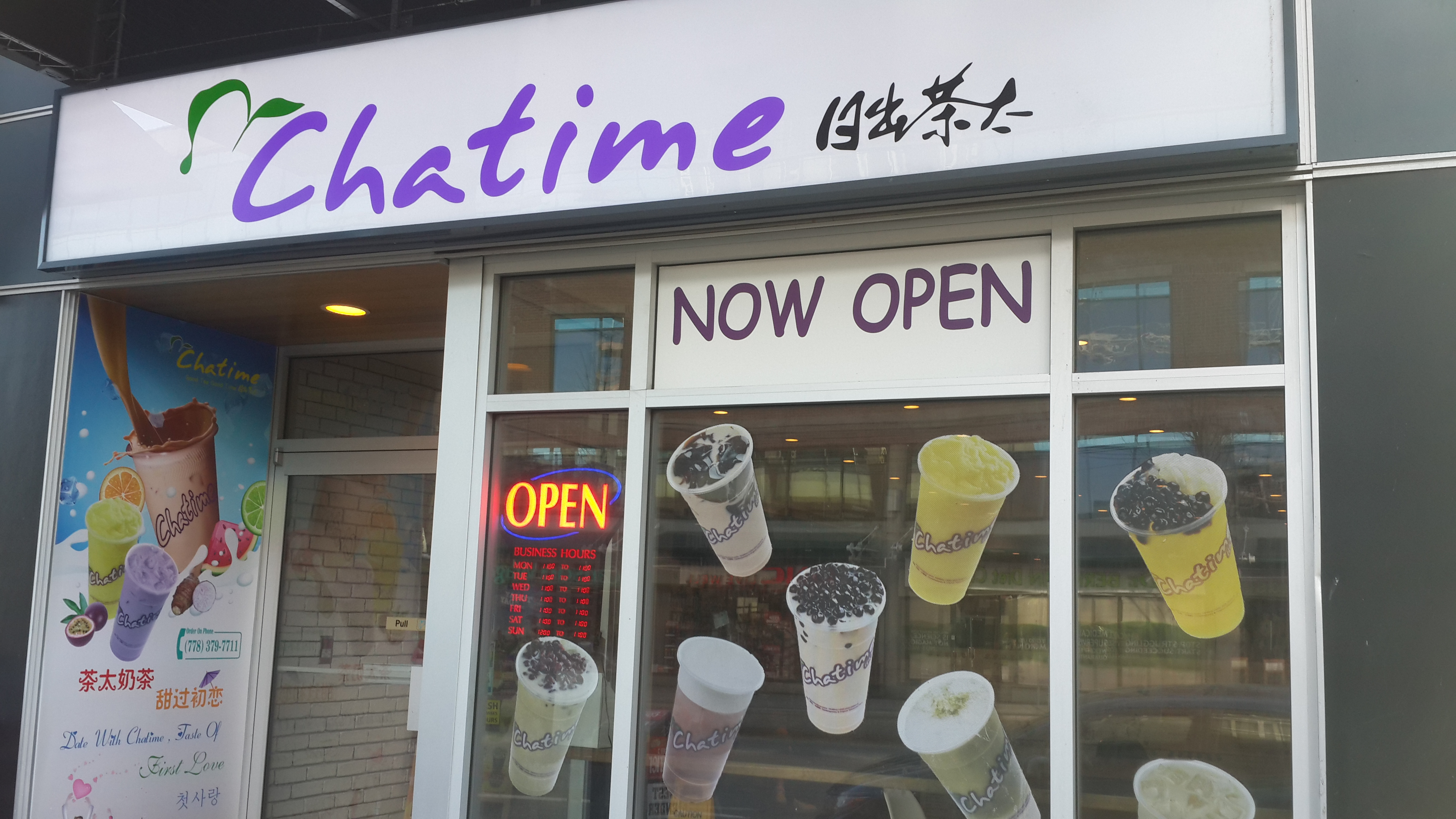
A Chatime store

- 85C Bakery Cafe
- Chatime
- Louisa Coffee
- TKK Fried Chicken

== Thailand ==
- Chester's
- EST.33
- Five Star Burger
- Five Star Chicken
- Gaggan
- MK Restaurant
- The Pizza Company
- Royal Dragon Restaurant
- Sirocco

== Turkey ==
- Mado
- Simit Sarayı

== Ukraine ==
- Burger Club
- Lviv Croissants
- McDonald's Ukraine
- Pizza Celentano

== United Arab Emirates ==
- Al Farooj Fresh
- Arab Udupi
- ChicKing
- Just Falafel

== United Kingdom ==
- Aberdeen Angus Steak Houses
- All Bar One
- AMT Coffee
- Ask
- Beefeater
- Bella Italia
- Brewers Fayre
- Café Rouge
- Caffè Nero
- Chicken Cottage
- Chiquito
- Coffee Republic
- Dixy Chicken
- EasyPizza
- Eat
- Frankie & Benny's
- Giraffe Restaurants
- Gourmet Burger Kitchen
- Greggs
- Harry Ramsden's
- Harvester
- Hotcha
- Hungry Horse
- Itsu
- J D Wetherspoon
- Leon
- Little Chef
- Loch Fyne
- Millie's Cookies
- OK Diner
- Pizza Express
- Pret a Manger
- Prezzo
- Punch Taverns
- Scream Pubs
- Slug and Lettuce
- Spudulike
- Strada
- Table Table
- Taybarns
- Toby Carvery
- Upper Crust
- Veeno
- Wagamama
- Walkabout
- Wasabi
- West Cornwall Pasty Company
- Wimpy
- Yates's
- YO! Sushi
- Zizzi

== See also ==
- List of barbecue restaurants
- List of casual dining restaurant chains
- List of coffeehouse chains
- List of chicken restaurants
- List of fast food restaurant chains
  - List of defunct fast-food restaurant chains
- List of ice cream parlors
- List of pizza chains
- Lists of restaurants
- List of revolving restaurants
- List of seafood restaurants
