= HotCha (disambiguation) =

HotCha may refer to:

- Hotcha Trio, a former harmonica ensemble from the Netherlands
- HotCha, a former Hong Kong cantopop trio group
- Hotcha Girls, a song from the 2002 album Sharpen Your Teeth by Ugly Casanova
- HotChaCha, a Cleveland-based art punk band
- Hotcha (company), a UK take-away restaurant chain that serves Chinese cuisine
