= Nana's Green Tea =

Restaurant chain

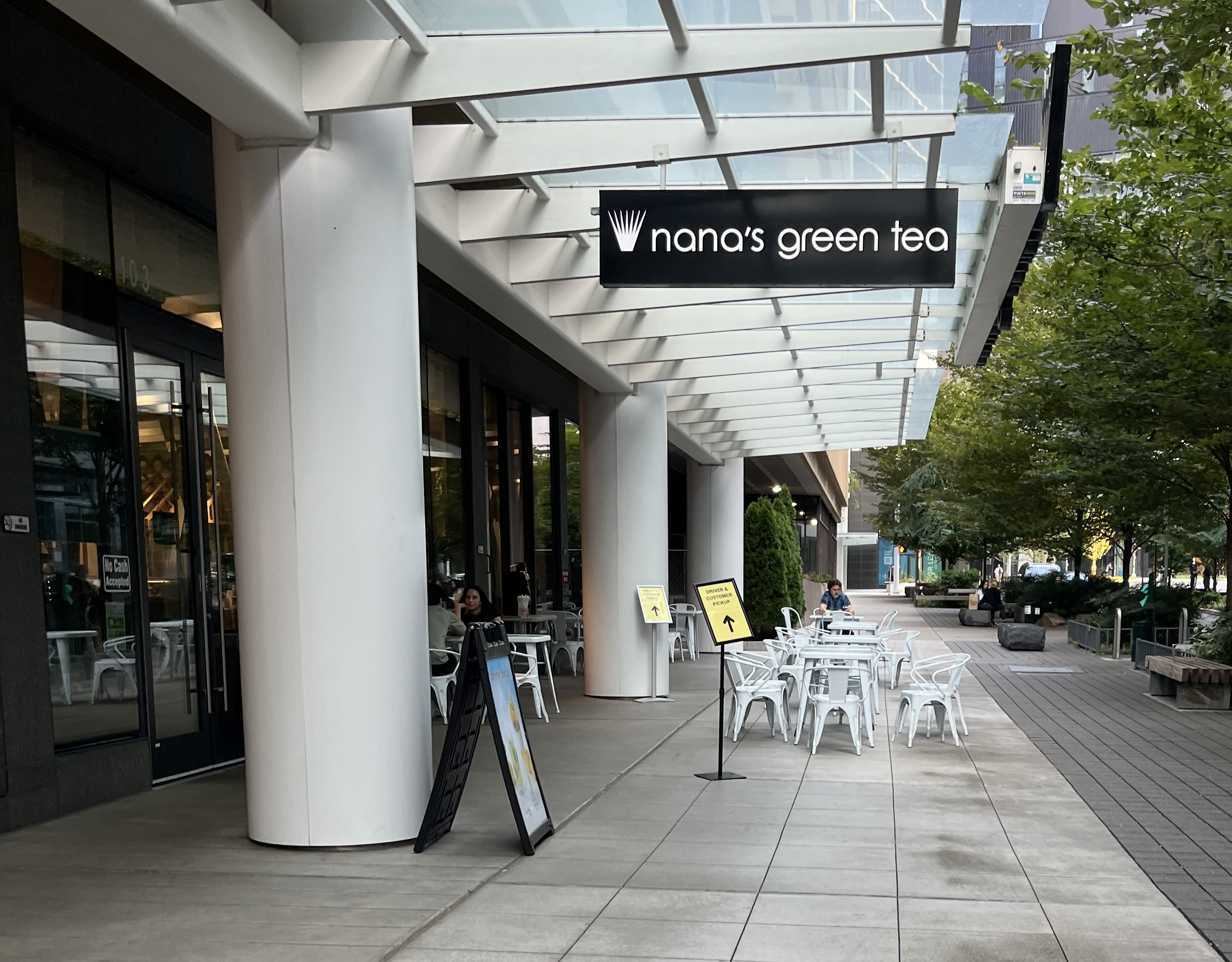
- Exterior of the shop in Seattle, 2024

Nana's Green Tea is a Japanese chain of tea shops.

== Description and history ==
The Japanese chain Nana's Green Tea has approximately 80 locations in Japan. Outside of Japan, there are sixteen locations, as of 2018. The menu includes lattes, and pastries, and sundaes.

Elsewhere in Asia, the business operates in Singapore and Taiwan.

In North America, the business operates in Hawaii and Vancouver, British Columbia, and the first location in the continental United States opened in Seattle. The Seattle shop, which opened in 2018, is owned by Jessmin Lau. Nana's Green Tea also operates in New York City.

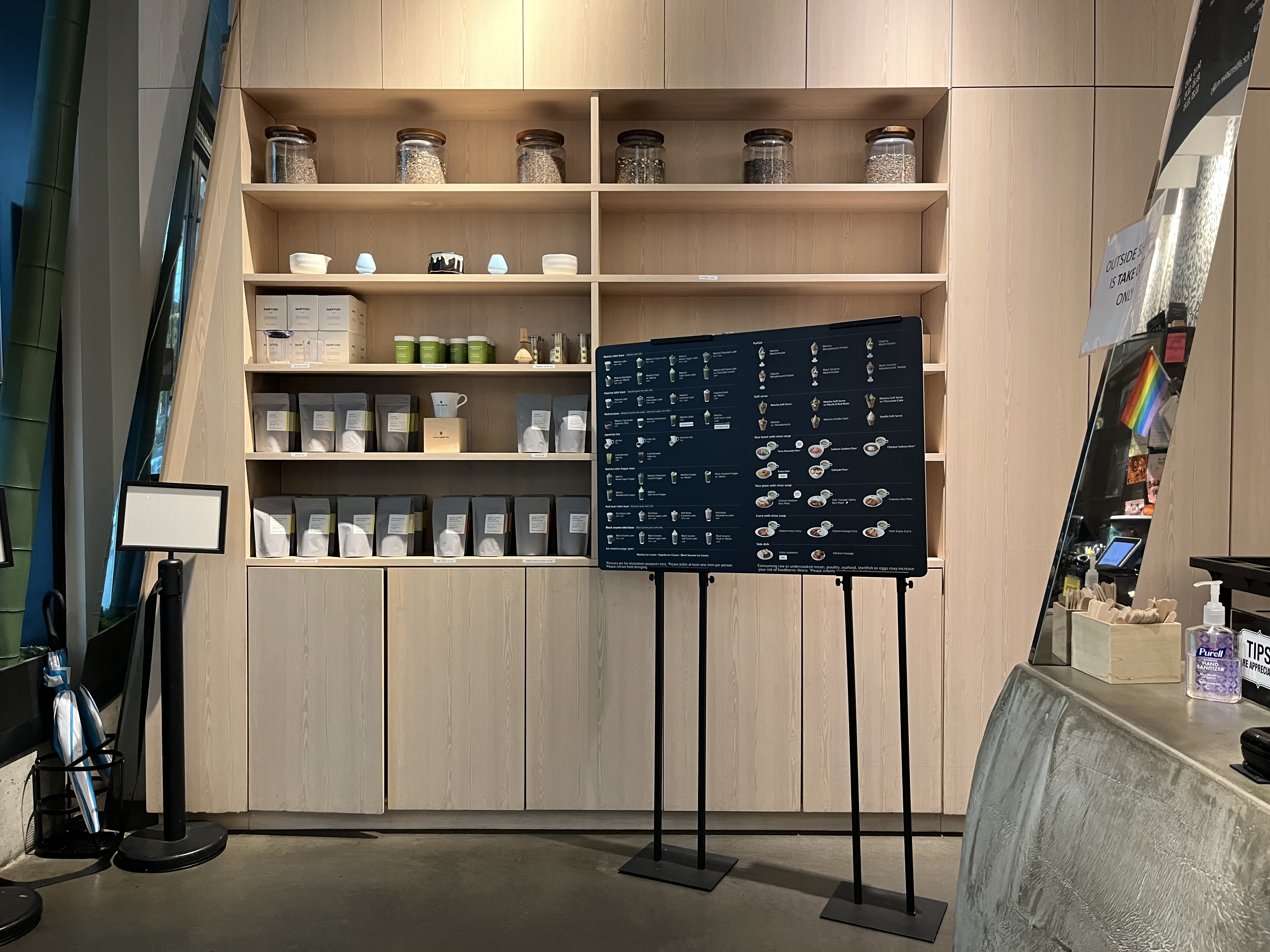
Interior of a shop in Seattle

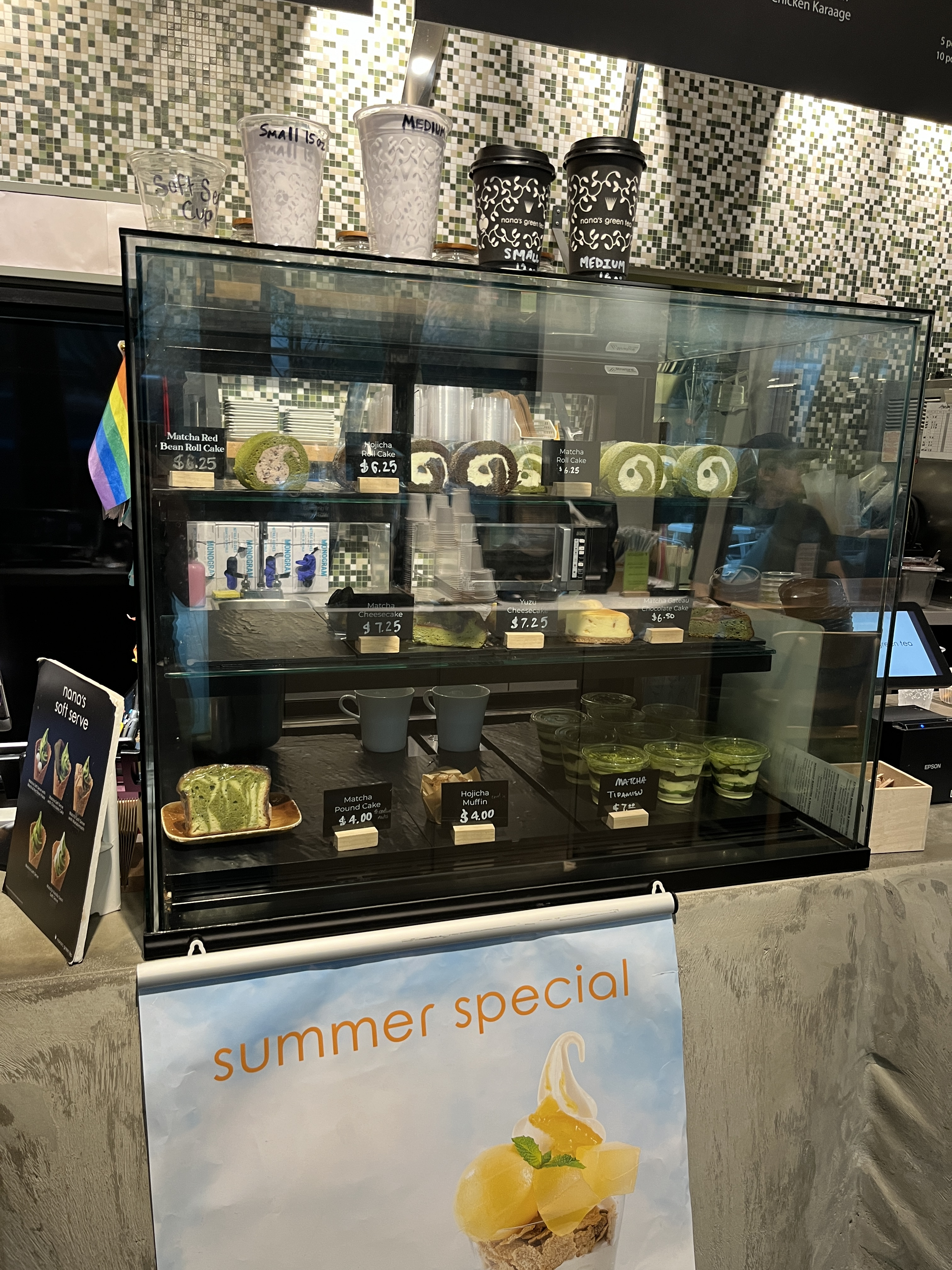
Display case with baked goods and other products, Seattle

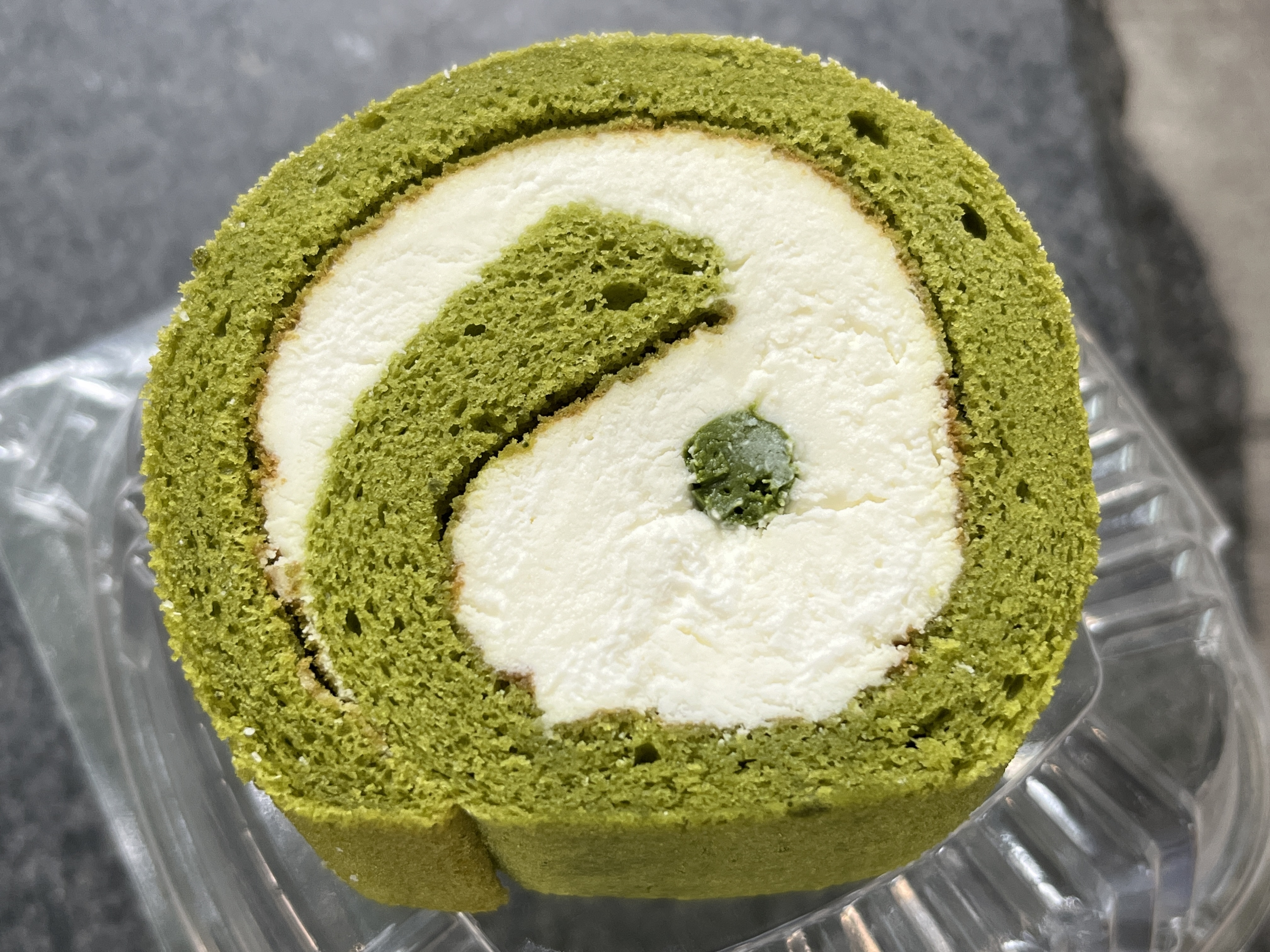
Matcha roll cake

== See also ==
- List of restaurant chains
- Tea culture in Japan
