= Malaysian Today =

English language newspaper in Malaysia

- Type: Bi-monthly
- Format: Tabloid
- Language: English
- Website: malaysia-today.net

Malaysian Today is an English-language bi-monthly tabloid which focuses on youth lifestyle, entertainment and sports. Published every first and third Thursday and owned by The Sun as an associate company, it can be picked up in selected outlets in the Klang Valley, especially in college and university vicinities and selected food courts and mamak restaurants. It can also be read in (but not removed from) certain shops, such as Starbucks, Coffee Bean and Secret Recipe outlets.

Malaysian Today started out as a regional newspaper in Sarawak reporting on local news. Founded in 2001, it ceased publication in December 2004. On 1 March 2005, the newspaper was revived as a sports biweekly in Peninsular Malaysia. It was headed by Jessie Soon, the daughter of Sarawak politician S'ng Chee Hua.

Until late 2006, the paper was published every Tuesday and Friday and distributed free to selected colleges and universities. It was also sold at the news-stands at RM0.50 until late 2005, after which it is available free of charge anywhere it was available.

As of January 2010, Malaysian Today is a bi-monthly youth-focused publication, publishing every first and third Thursday of each month, with additional multimedia content updated on the website.

Veteran journalist Hisham Harun is the paper's Contributing Editor.
