= Commerce house =

Building in Tampere, Finland

Coordinates: 61°29′50.7″N 23°45′35.0″E

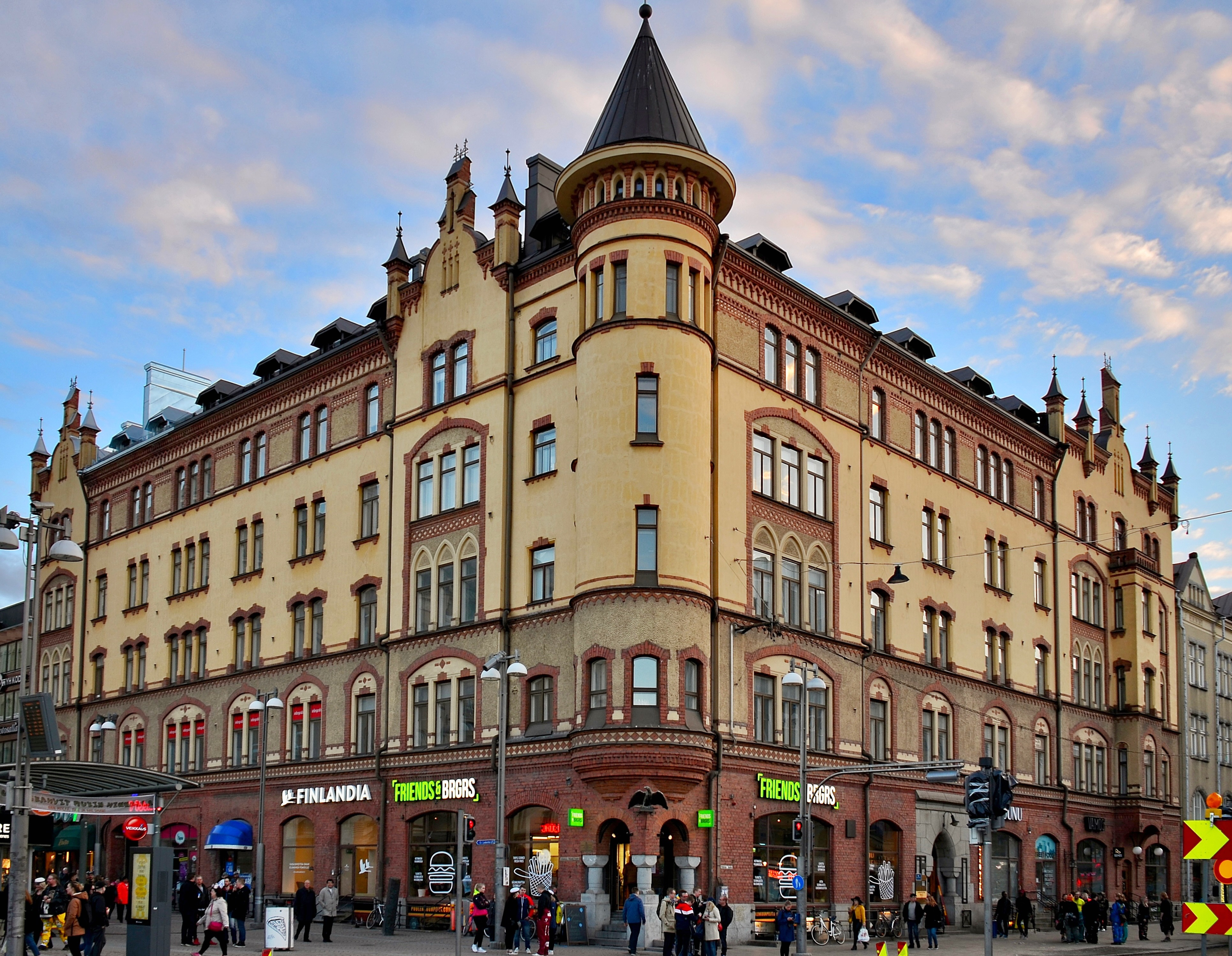
The Commerce house in April 2018.

The Commerce house is a five-floor residential and business building in Tampere, Finland, located along the Hämeenkatu street and the Tampere Central Square at the so-called Jugendtori square, built in 1899. The building represents the Art Nouveau style and was designed by the Helsinki-based architecture bureau Andersin, Jung ja Bomanson (architects Bertel Jung, Waldemar Andersin and Oscar Bomanson). The name of the building comes from the French word commerce, meaning business or commerce.

For a long time, the building hosted the Hotel Central, founded in 1907. The hotel was later renamed Hotel Centrum. The corner business space of the building hosted the Ensimmäinen apteekki pharmacy ("first pharmacy", originally spelled Ensimäinen apteekki according to the spelling rules at the time) until 1983, after which it hosted Finland's first McDonald's hamburger restaurant on 14 December 1984.

For a short time, from 1983 to 1984, the business space hosted a Burger King restaurant. In May 2010 the restaurant was threatened by a fire which had started from the fat fryer in the McDonald's restaurant. The repairs of the fire damage lasted for two years and the McDonald's restaurant was reopened in spring 2012. The McDonald's restaurant was closed down in autumn 2015 and was replaced by a restaurant of the Friends & Brgrs hamburger restaurant chain in early 2016.

== See also ==
- List of hamburger restaurants
