= Cervecería 100 Montaditos =

Spanish restaurant chain

100 Montaditos
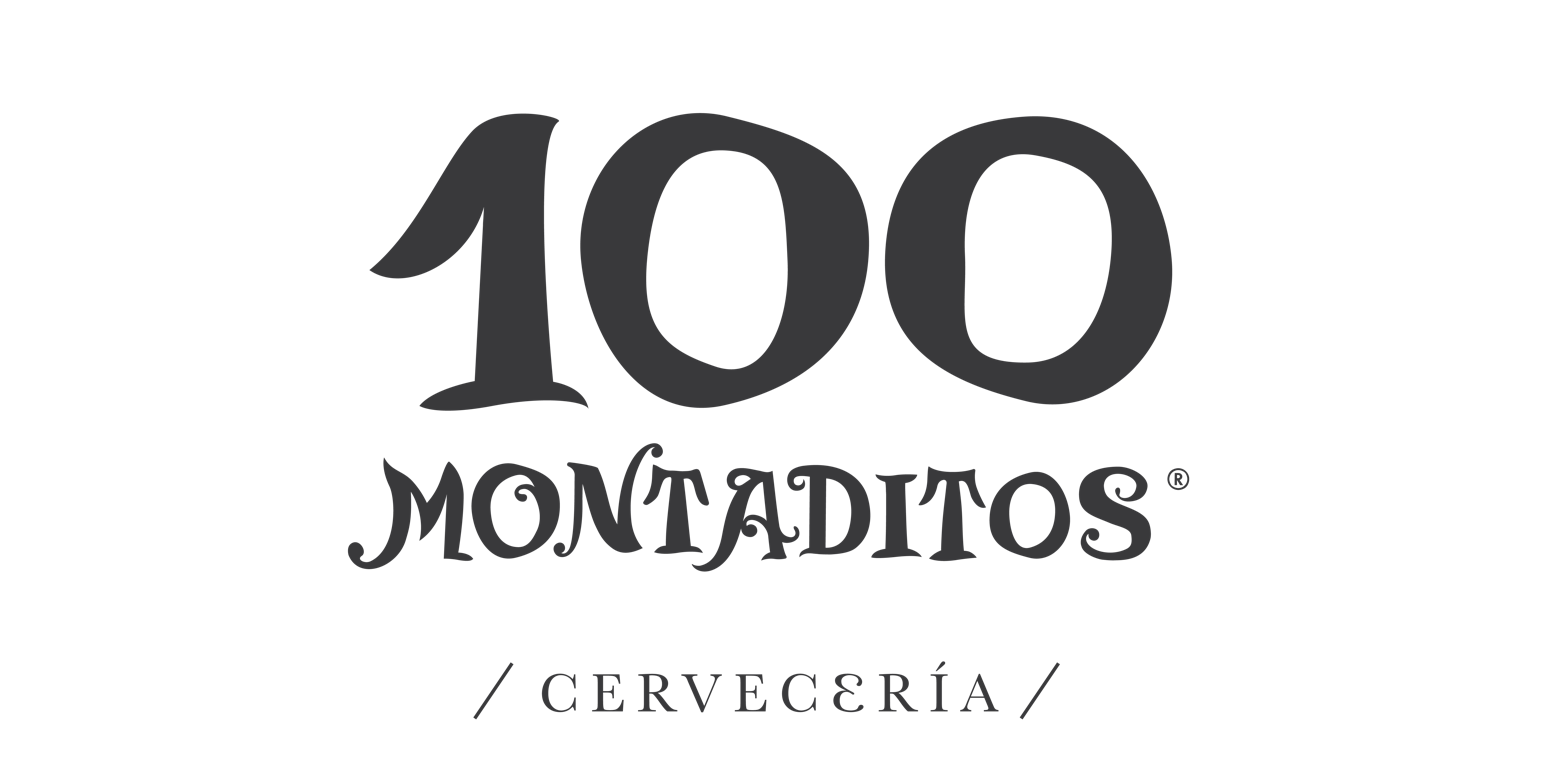

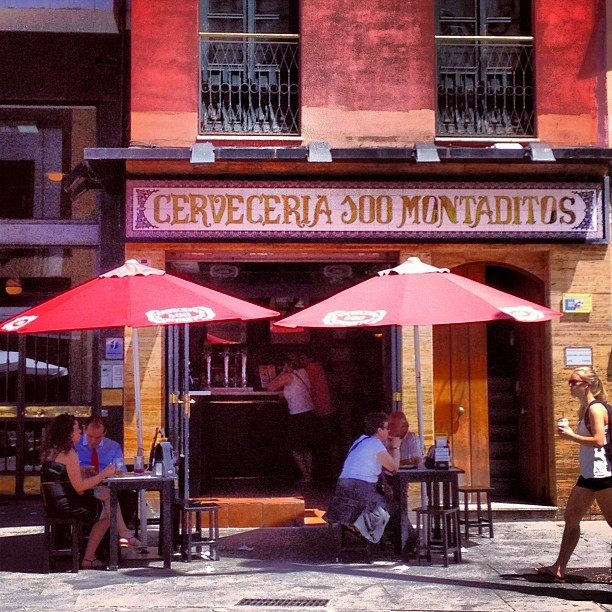
- Location: Pozuelo de Alarcón, Spain
- Opened: 2000
- Website: http://www.100montaditos.com

Cervecería 100 Montaditos is a restaurant chain in Spain specializing in sandwiches. The chain has over 350 retail stores in Spain. It has more than 90 restaurants in foreign countries: 34 in Italy, 20 in Portugal, 13 in Mexico, 5 in the United States, 3 in Guatemala, 2 in Colombia, 2 in Chile, 1 in Costa Rica, 1 in the Dominican Republic, 1 in Paraguay, 1 in Ecuador, 1 in Panama, 1 in the Netherlands.

== Origin of the name ==
The term refers to an ancient Spanish culinary habit of filling one or two small slices of bread with various ingredients such as cold cuts, meat, fish, vegetables, cheeses or various types of sauces.

100 Montaditos has thus decided to take inspiration from this tradition by giving life to a list of a hundred different proposals.

From the historical ones with jamón serrano or tortilla de patatas, to those designed specifically for the local market, up to the sweet ones.

== History ==
The first 100 Montaditos restaurant was opened in Spain in 2000 on a small beach in Islantilla, Huelva, by the hand of the Seville entrepreneur Jose María Capitán.

In subsequent years, they opened an average of twenty stores per year, eventually exceeding more than 200 restaurants in Spain at the beginning of 2012.

In 2010, they opened their first restaurant outside of Spain, in the United States.

In 2012, Cervecería 100 Montaditos reached Latin America.

On March 6, 2015, Cervecerìa 100 Montaditos filed for bankruptcy in the U.S.

In November 2015, the company, already with a solid presence in Italy, opened a second restaurant with the aim of making it the most important in the foreign market. Here, the Spanish word "Cervecería" (which literally means "Brewery") has been omitted, keeping only the name 100 Montaditos.
