= Mie Gacoan =

Indonesian noodle restaurant chain

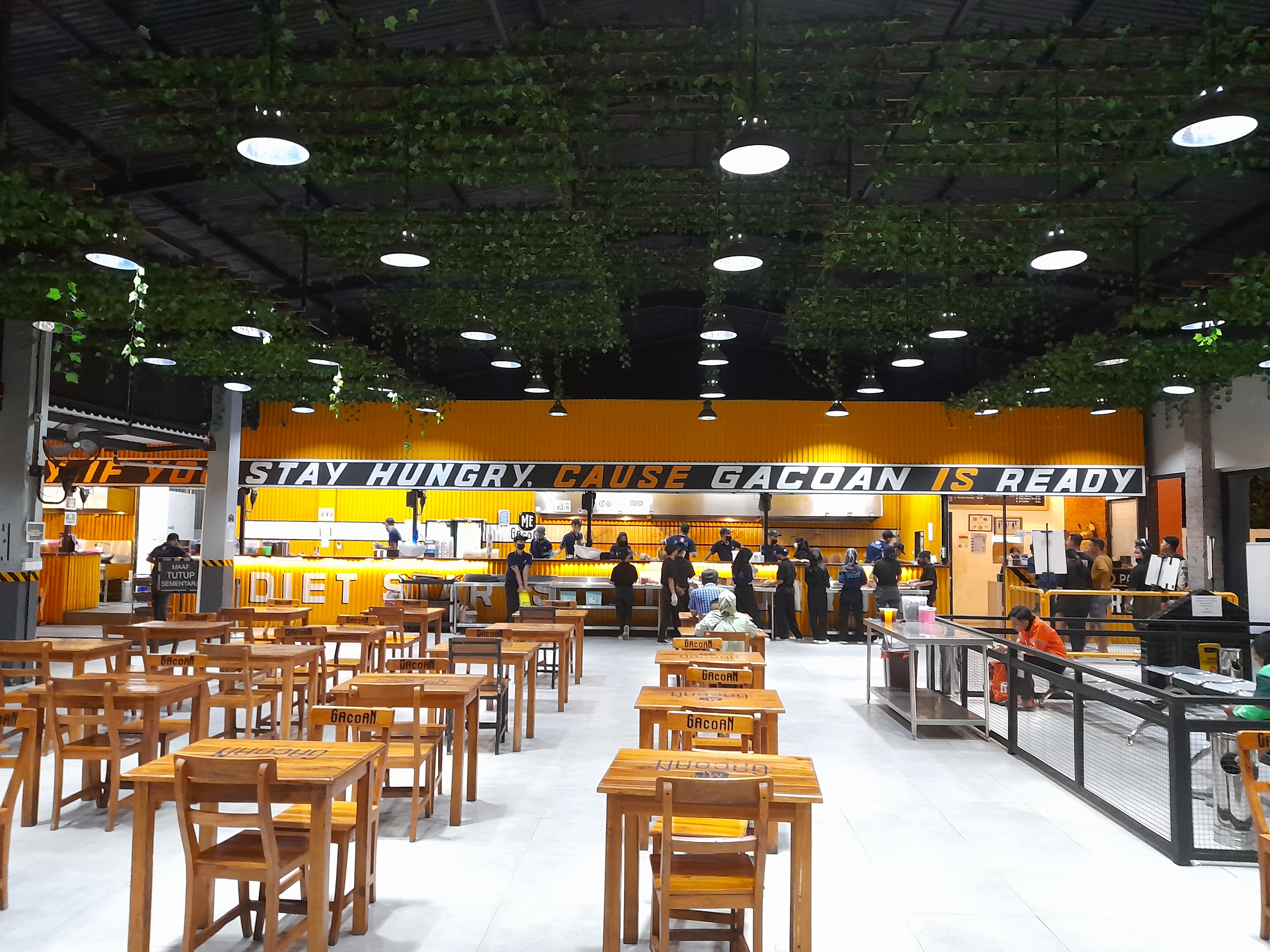
- Mie Gacoan Stall on Kuta Road, Kuta District, Badung, Bali
- Trade name: Mie Gacoan
- Type: Perseroan Terbatas
- Industry: Restaurant
- Founded: 2016; 10 years ago
- Headquarters: Jl. Peltu Sujono No.9, Ciptomulyo, Sukun, Malang, West Java 65148
- Number of locations: 280+ (2025)
- Key people: Anton Kurniawan (Founder and Chief Executive Officer (CEO)); Harris Kristanto (Chief Operating Officer (COO))
- Products: Mi goreng, dim sum, fruit ice
- Website: miegacoan.com

PT Pesta Pora Abadi, trading as Mie Gacoan, is a franchising restaurant from Indonesia. The business was founded in early 2016 in Malang. Mie Gacoan is known for selling spicy fried noodles at low prices, a strategy designed to target a young audience. By 2025, Mie Gacoan will have more than 280 branches across Indonesia, with the largest number on the island of Java. In their business, Mie Gacoan has employed more than 10,000 workers. The word "Gacoan" comes from Javanese language which means champion or pillar.

== History ==
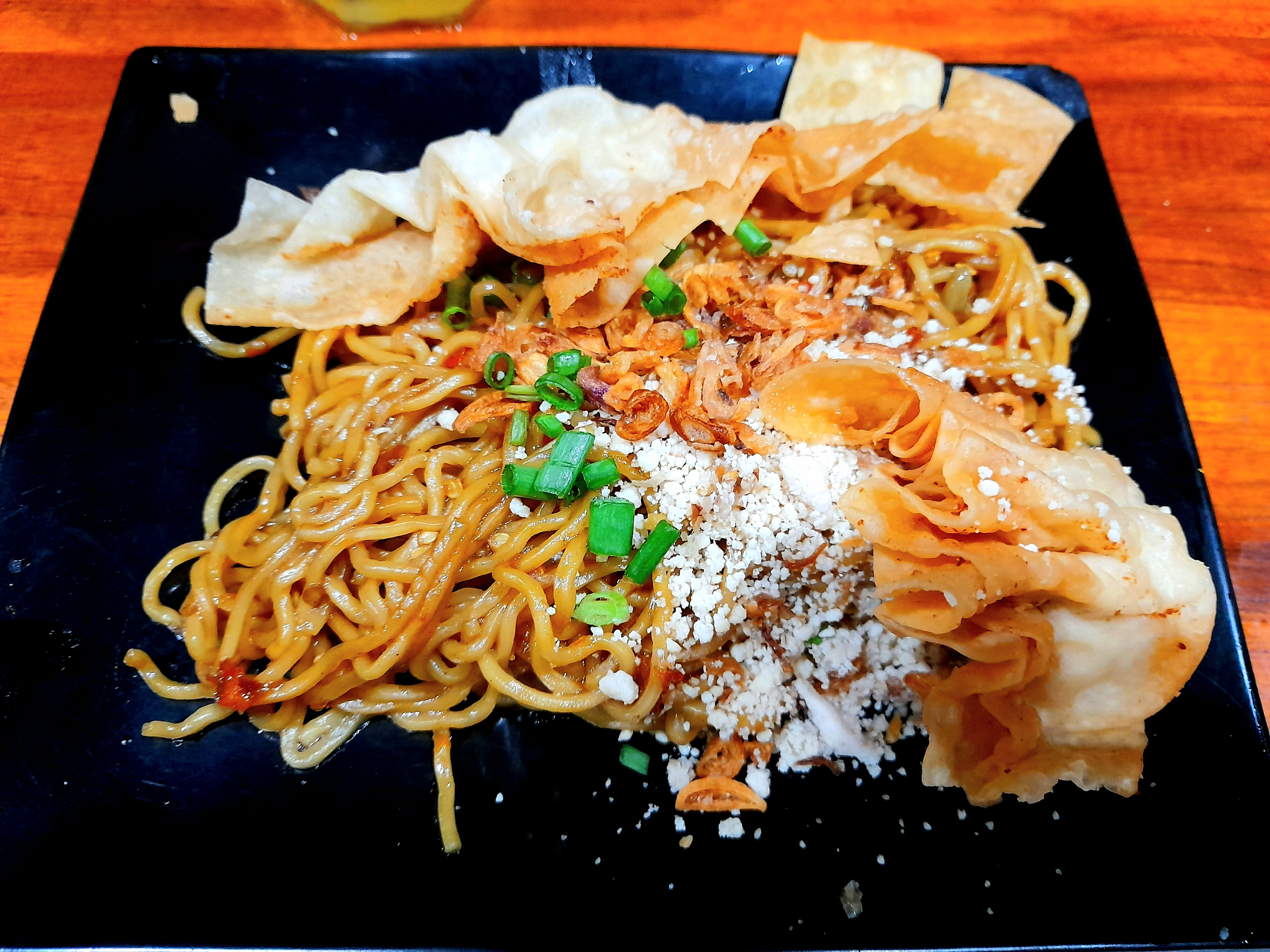
Mie Gacoan

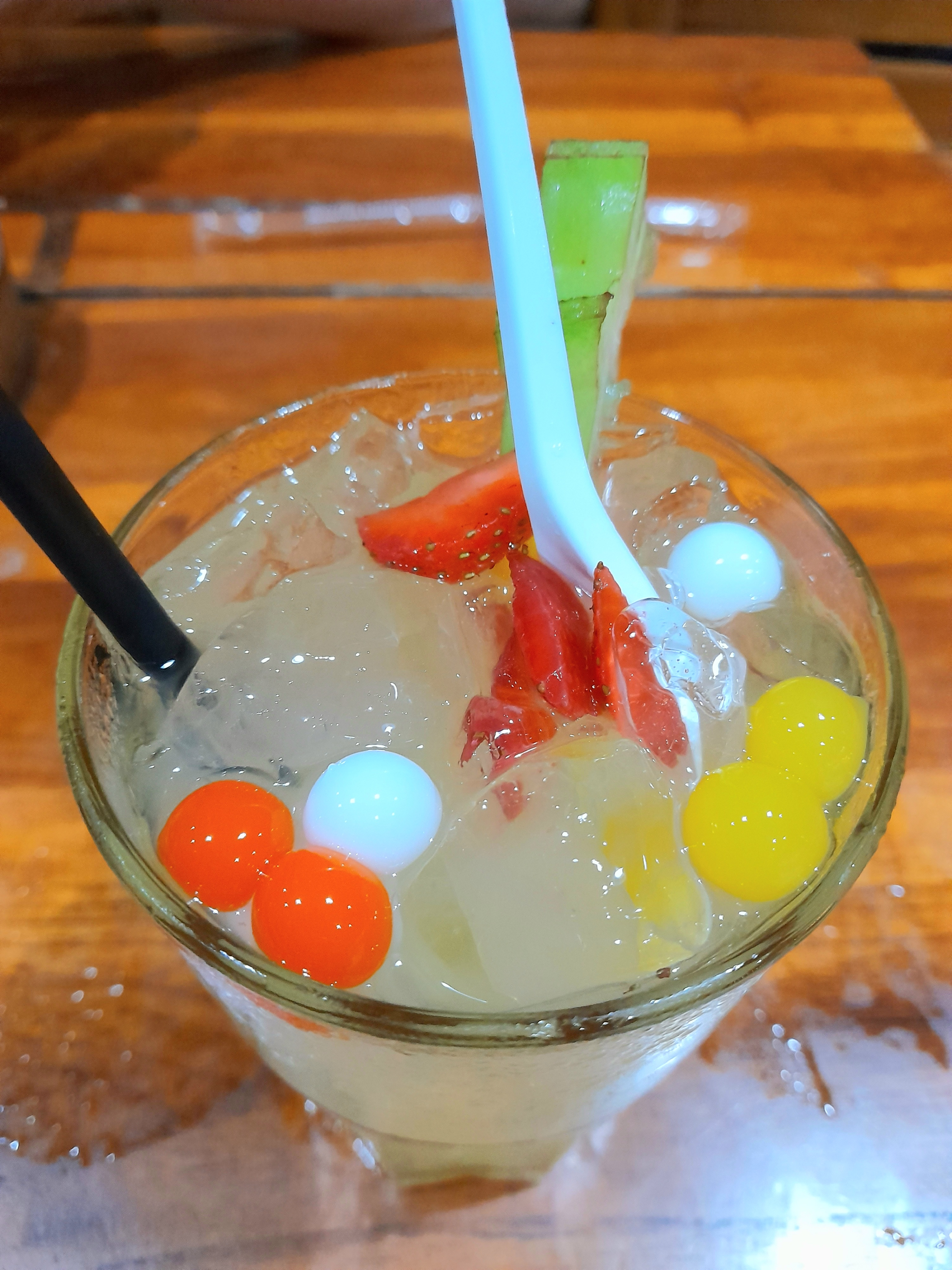
Iced fruits with Nata de coco

Mie Gacoan was founded by Anton Kurniawan, an entrepreneur from Malang, in 2016. Not much information is known about Anton, as he chooses to refrain from appearing in public. Due to the lack of information about him, many sources incorrectly cite Harris Kristanto, an ethnic Chinese entrepreneur from Surakarta city, Central Java, as the founder of this company.
