= Rosso (restaurant) =

Finnish restaurant chain

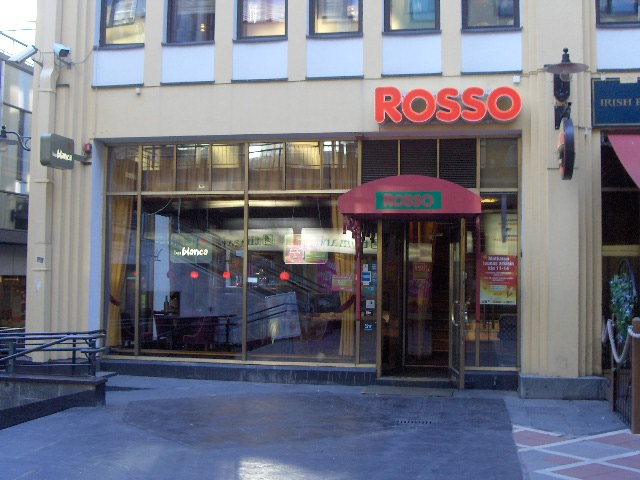
A Rosso restaurant in the centre of Helsinki in 2006.

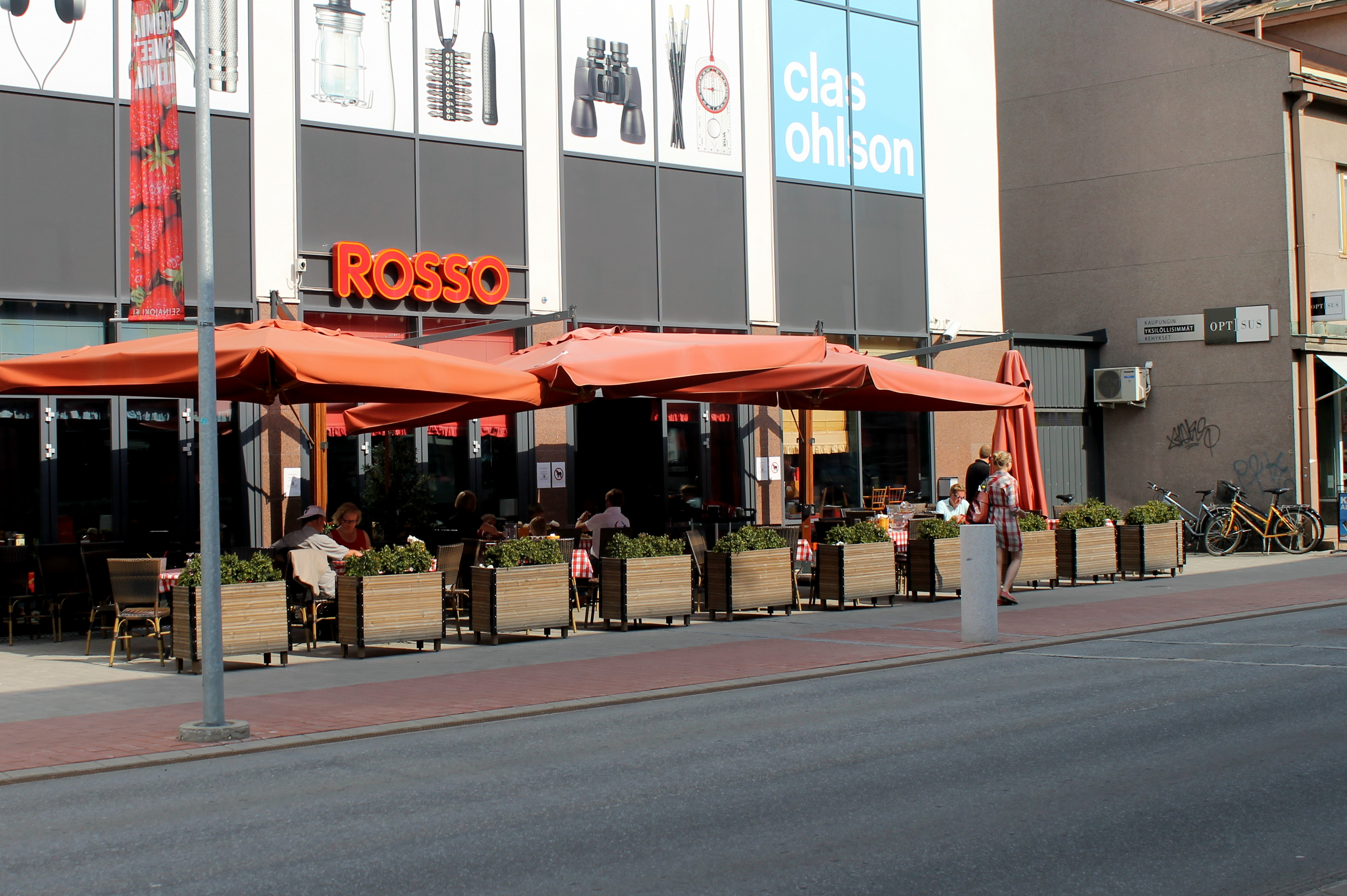
A Rosso restaurant in the centre of Seinäjoki in 2013.

Rosso is a Finnish family restaurant chain serving Italian cuisine, owned by the S Group.

== Restaurants ==
The Rosso restaurants are Italian-style restaurants located near the city centre, usually at shopping centres or Sokos Hotels hotels. In 2018 there were a total of 28 Rosso restaurants in Finland. In 2011 the chain employed about 700 people. As food preferences became more international the Rosso restaurants have been developed into a more authentic Italian flavour since the late 2010s.

== Rosso Express ==
Rosso Express restaurants sell pizza and pan pizza. Rosso Express restaurants are located at transport centres owned by the S Group, at shopping centres and at Prisma and Sokos stores, forming a restaurant world together with Presso and Hesburger.

== History ==
The first Rosso restaurant was opened in the centre of Lahti in 1978. By the middle 1980s there were about ten Rosso restaurants, and in 1997 there were 46. The Rosso concept was designed by the married couple Aimo and Maria Bonden, both having worked at HOK-Elanto for a long time, in their own words "without ever having visited Italy". The idea was to lower the threshold for Finns to dine at restaurants. Pizza, having become common in Finland in the 1970s, was chosen as the main product of laid-back restaurant dining, and so Rosso was the first country-wide pizza chain in Finland. There was no bouncer or a separate wine cashier, but still there were very few disturbances. Rosso restaurants did not allow table reservations, and the restaurants opened already at nine o'clock in the morning. Another new concept was a play corner for children, and staff was instructed to always speak to the children first.

Together with the restaurant chain Martina, Rosso was one of Restel's first restaurant chains to use a lot of pre-made foodstuffs: peeled and processed frozen potatoes, pre-made sauces and pre-cut meat. The idea was to provide identical meals in all restaurants for families with children and other target groups seeking a safe and familiar experience, as well as to save in labour expenses: a restaurant kitchen could even only be staffed by a single person.

In 1995 Rosso introduced a starter buffet table offering stripped vegetables and baguette bread. In 2014 this was replaced by an Italian-style antipasto buffet table. Since the 2010s Rosso has also offered Italian-style risotto.
