= D'Cost =

Indonesian company

D'COST Seafood PT Pendekar Bodoh
- Type: Private
- Founded: 9 September 2006
- Founder: Christian Sia
- Headquarters: Jakarta, Indonesia
- Number of locations: 68 (2025)
- Products: Seafood
- Website: https://www.dcostseafood.id

D'COST Seafood is a restaurant franchise headquartered in Jakarta, Indonesia. The restaurant was first established on Jl. Kemang Raya, South Jakarta, on September 9, 2006.
