= Café Neo =

Nigerian coffeehouse chain

Cafè Neo
- Type: Private
- Industry: Restaurants
- Founded: 2012
- Headquarters: Lagos, Nigeria
- Key people: Ngozi Dozie; Chijioke Dozie
- Products: Coffee, tea
- Website: www.mycafeneo.com

Cafè Neo is a coffee roaster and coffeehouse chain based in Lagos.

The company started in 2012 as a family-owned chain when brothers Ngozi Dozie and Chijioke Dozie began a coffee roasting business in Lagos. The flagship store is located in Victoria Island, Lagos. Other chains of the brand also operate in the city.
