= Mi goreng =

Mi goreng may refer to:

- Mie goreng, Indonesian fried noodle
- Mee goreng, Bruneian, Malaysian, or Singaporean fried noodle
