= Kharina Steakhouse =

Brazilian restaurant chain

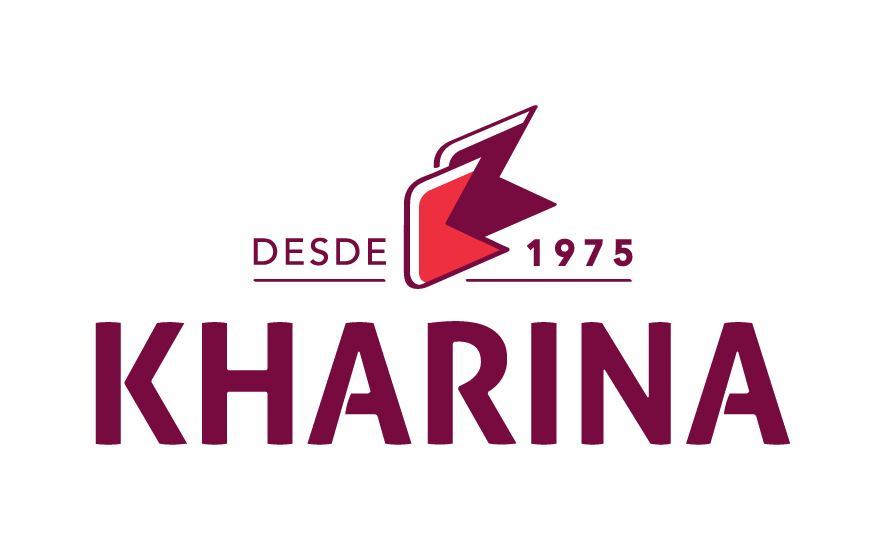
- Formerly: Tog
- Type: Chain store
- Industry: Restaurant
- Genre: Drive-in, casual dining, fast food
- Founded: November 14, 1975; 50 years ago in Curitiba, Brazil
- Founder: Rachid Cury Filho
- Website: https://kharina.com.br

Kharina Steakhouse, previously named Tog, is a family business casual dining chain store from Curitiba.

== History ==
The restaurant was created by Rachid Cury Filho after he felt frustrated in his old job at a tire shop. Initially called Tog, the concept came from the drive-ins he saw in American films. He bought one terrain of his father in Capanema, Curitiba (nowadays renamed as Jardim Botânico), thus inaugurating the first unit on 14 November 1975.

In 1981, a second unit of Kharina was opened in Batel. The drive-in movement became slower, and the restaurant focused on table service. Cury quickly formed a partnership with Roberto Mehl, but it was dissolved and the restaurant was renamed Kharina. The name was based on a Bhutan legend where a young chef named Karina went to Europe to learn how to cook and, when she came back, she has enchanted the king with her ground meat recipe and has married him. Cury added a "h" in the name for "cabalistic reasons". Later, a unit in Água Verde was inaugurated.

In the 2010s, the franchise's growth has stagnated due the arrival of international franchises, such as The Fifties, Applebee's and Outback Steakhouse, and the creation of new restaurants using the same model, such as Madero. In 2012, the franchise was reformulated to work with casual dining and the restaurants were reformed, and on 10 July Kharina's logo has changed. In 2013, a unit was opened in Cabral. In 2017, a restaurant was opened in Centro Cívico, working with an all-day model. There's also a unit in Portão.

In 2017, Kharina invested in expanding the franchise to another states, with the first restaurant inaugurated at Shopping Parque da Cidade in São Paulo. There are also stores at Shopping Anália Franco (SP), Campinas and Londrina. In 2020, during the Covid-19 Pandemic, Kharina operated with take away and delivery, and reinaugurated the drive in.

== Food ==
Kharina is a casual dining and steakhouse restaurant that works with eco-kitchen, a concept Cury met at the NRA Show, in Chicago. The restaurant has won the Green Kitchen and Echo Lixo Útil seals.

Initially, Kharina served burgers and milkshakes at the client's car. In 1981 the restaurant began serving open sandwiches called Club Kharina, the most sold dish of the franchise. In 2012 Prime Burgers, a line of 8 burgers, was released.

Karina serves breakfast that includes pão de queijo, coffee, orange juice, muffins, pão na chapa, sandwiches, cheesecakes and mousses. It also serves business lunch that includes steak, espetinho, strogonoff, fish, pasta, several types of salad, feijoada, and soups.

The restaurant also opens for happy hours and works with kids' meal.

== Prizes ==
Year	Award	Category	Result	Ref.
2025	Prêmio Bom Gourmet	Business Plate	Won	
2024	Prêmio Bom Gourmet	Kids Space	Won	
2023	TopView	Kids Space	Won	
