= Islantilla =

Coastal town in Andalusia, Spain

Coordinates: 37.2067°N 7.23679°W

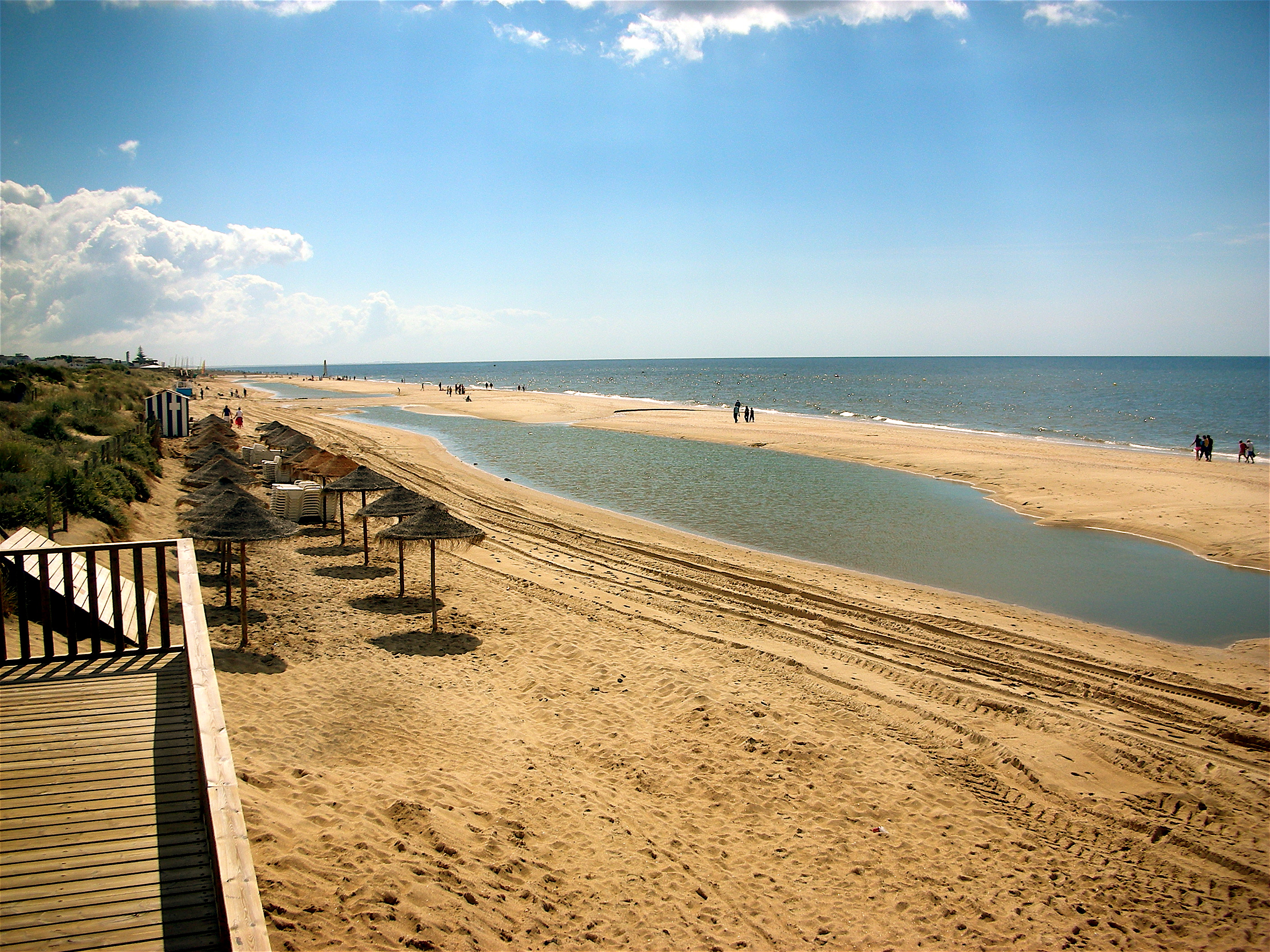

Islantilla is a seaside resort town located next to La Antilla, between the municipalities of Lepe and Isla Cristina, in Andalusia, Spain. Islantilla belongs to a tourist region called "Costa de la Luz". Huelva is an urban center close to Islantilla. Islantilla attracts thousands of tourists per year.
