= Hamerica's =

Italian restaurant chain

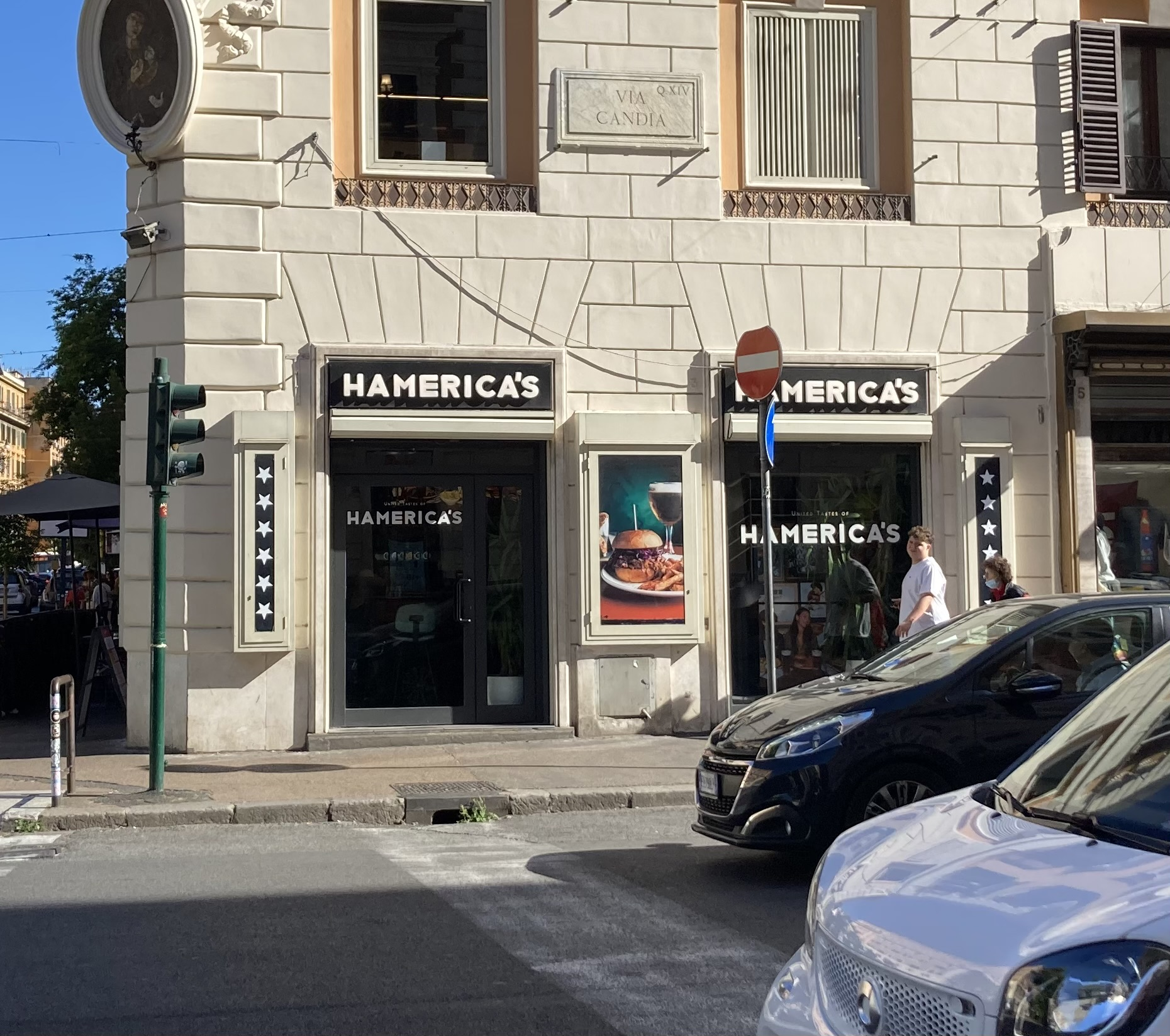
- Exterior of a location in Rome
- Company type: Private
- Industry: Foodservice
- Founded: 2007
- Founder: Ivan Totaro; Francesca Totaro
- Headquarters: Milan
- Number of locations: 30 (2022)
- Area served: Italy
- Website: www.hamericas.com

Hamerica's is an Italian restaurant chain serving American cuisine. It is a combination of three other restaurant chains, the oldest of which was established in 2007. It has about 30 locations in northern Italy.

== History ==
212 Hamburger was founded in 2007 by Ivan Totaro and his wife Francesca, both natives of Milan. They had previously wanted to open an Italian restaurant in the United States but ended up doing the inverse after it did not succeed. They called the restaurant they opened 212 Hamburger and mainly sold meat products from it. Later, they also opened 212 Rotisserie and Carolina's, which sold fried chicken and smoked meat, respectively. In 2016, however, they decided to revitalise the restaurant and expand the menu by combining the three chains and rebranding them to the United Tastes of Hamerica's, with the actual process occurring in 2017. Hamerica's is a shortened form of House of America.

== Menu ==
Hamerica's serves items from American cuisine, including french fries, nachos, onion rings, mozzarella sticks, Jalapeño poppers, chicken nuggets, popcorn chicken, buffalo wings, fried cod, calamari, fried shrimp, a variety of burgers and salads, club sandwiches, avocado toast, pork ribs, pulled pork, tortilla wraps, burritos, and tacos. For dessert, the chain offers key lime pie, cheesecake, chocolate cake, carrot cake, peanut butter tiramisu, sponge cake, and ice cream. Wines and beers are also sold. A limited edition offer brought the restaurant cooked turkey for Thanksgiving in 2017 and Chicago-style pizza in 2023.

A location in Milan offers an eating challenge where the participant has to finish a burger weighing 1 kg (2.2 lb). It contains 800 g (1.8 lb) of meat and 200 g (0.44 lb) of chili, cheddar, bacon, tomato, salad, and bread. The challenge also includes 400 g (0.88 lb) of french fries. Participants have the finish the burger and fries in 35 minutes to get the burger, which costs €30, for free. They have 1 L (35 imp fl oz; 34 US fl oz) of water to assist them.

== Locations ==
As of 2022, Hamerica's has thirty locations, all in Italy. Out of the thirty, eight are in Milan. Locations in Italian cities are dedicated for American cities; for example, the Hamerica's in Trieste was dedicated to Chicago while Treviso had New York City. Some of the interior are even modeled after the atmosphere in the city.
