= McDonald's Ukraine =

Subsidiary of American fast food company

- Final logo, used from 2006 to 2022

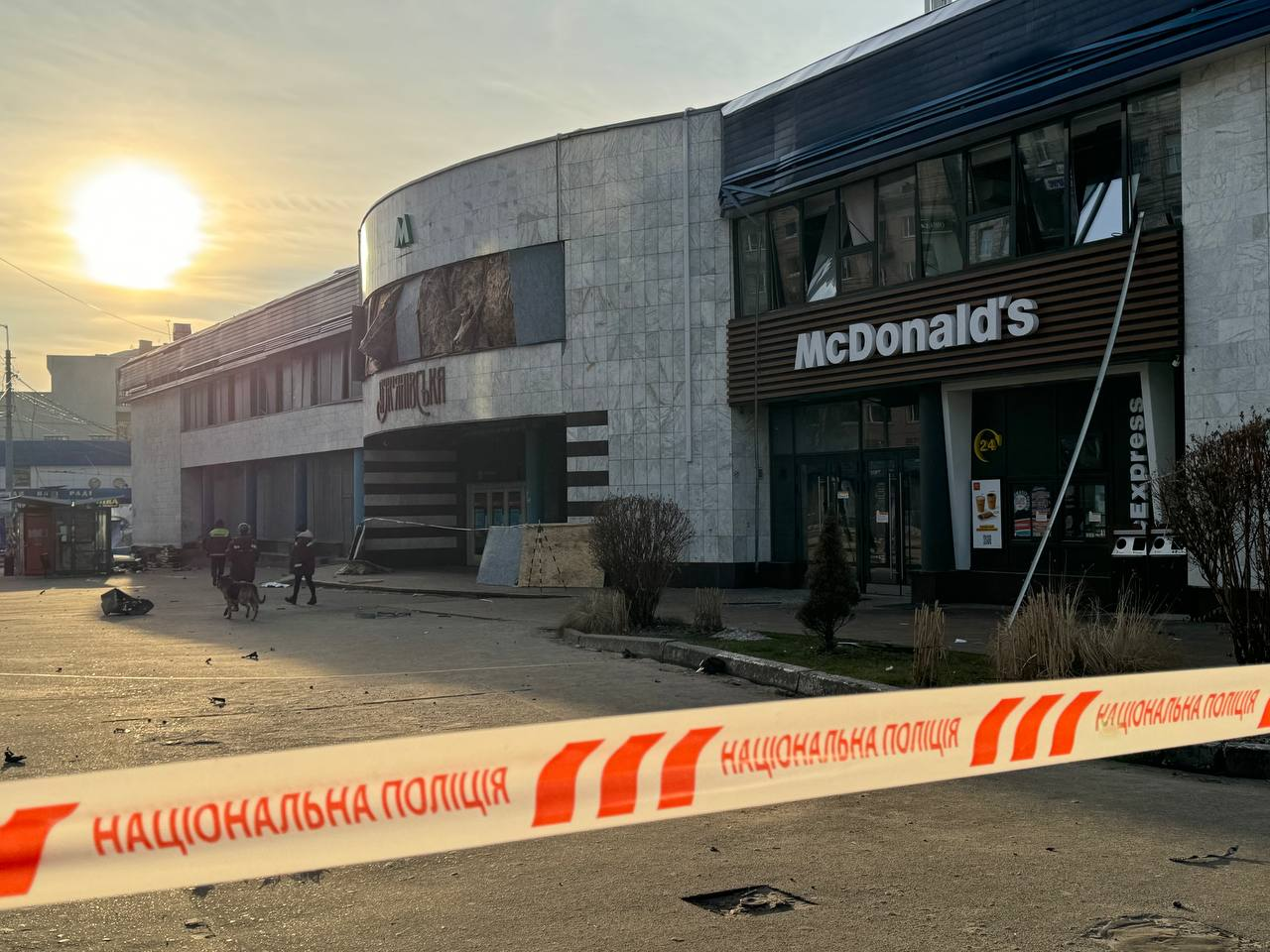
- Ukraine's first McDonald's store near Lukianivska metro station in Kyiv, damaged by a Russian attack in 2023
- Company type: Subsidiary
- Industry: Restaurant
- Genre: Fast food
- Founded: 1997; 29 years ago in Kyiv; 2026; 0 years ago in Korosten
- Headquarters: Ukraine
- Area served: Ukraine
- Revenue: 21,318,931,000 hryvnia (2025)
- Total assets: 7,062,506,000 hryvnia (2025)
- Number of employees: 9,638 (2024)
- Parent: McDonald's
- Website: https://www.mcdonalds.com/ua

From 1997 onward, the American fast food chain McDonald's has operated McDonald's restaurants in Ukraine. It does so directly, without franchising.

The restaurants have been impacted by the Russo-Ukrainian War. McDonald's closed its restaurants in Simferopol, Sevastopol, and Yalta following the Russian annexation of Crimea, and later closed further outlets in Donetsk, Luhansk, and Mariupol at the start of the War in Donbas in 2014. It closed all 109 of its Ukraine restaurants in February 2022 in the early days of the Russian invasion of Ukraine, and some of its restaurants were destroyed or occupied by Russia. The company underwent a phased reopening of the surviving restaurants, and plans to increase its presence in the nation to nearly 120 restaurants by the end of 2025.

== Early years ==
=== Background ===
Ukraine gained independence from the Soviet Union in 1991, six years prior to the arrival of the first McDonald's in the country, and in 1997 was beginning to open up to the West.

=== Entry ===
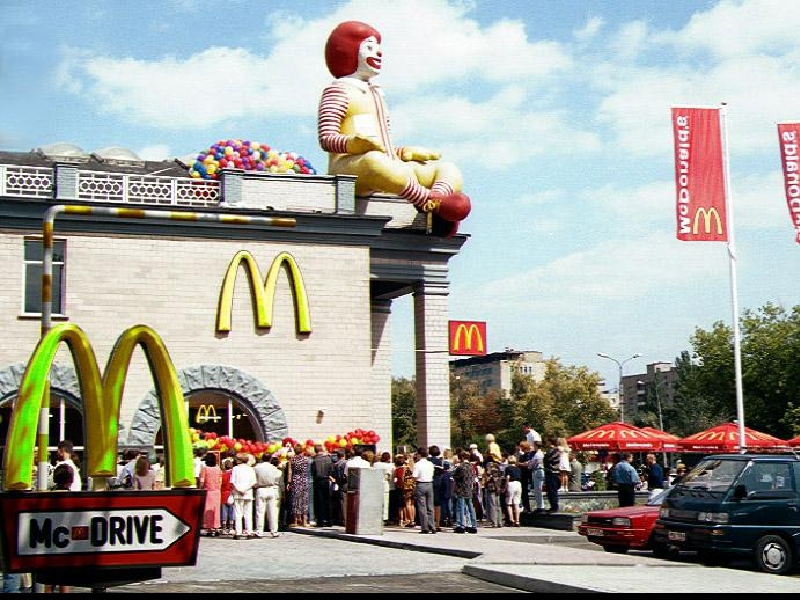
An early Ukrainian McDonald's restaurant prior to 2001, in Donetsk.

McDonald’s opened its first Ukraine restaurant on 24 May 1997, after taking 99 days to build it. This restaurant is located near the Lukianivska metro station in Kyiv. The opening proved a significant attraction, with crowds lining up for multiple days for its burgers. Company officials stated that McDonald's was to invest $100 million in Ukraine and open seven outlets that year, with the second restaurant then planned to open in Kharkiv in eastern Ukraine a month after the first. The company planned to have 85 outlets in the country by the year 2000.

By August 2002, McDonald's had spent a total $76 million to build 49 restaurants in Ukraine; it planned to invest $50 million to double its restaurants in Ukraine by 2007, including 14 restaurants in Kiev, Odesa and other cities in 2003. It also planned to double its staff to 6,000 people by 2007. In 2011, the McDonald’s restaurant at Kyiv’s central train station was the company's second-busiest in the world.

== Impact of the Russo-Ukrainian War ==
=== Russian annexation of Crimea ===
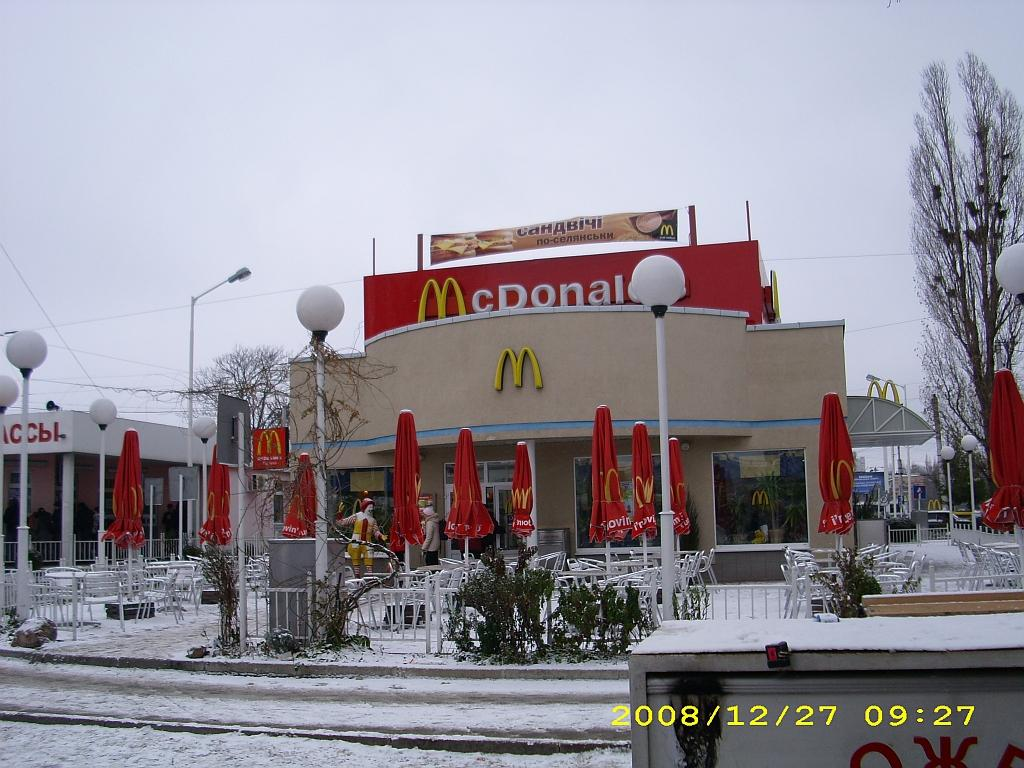
A McDonald's restaurant in Simferopol, Crimea, in 2008.

Following the Russian annexation of Crimea in March 2014, McDonald's announced the temporary closure of its outlets in Crimea's main cities of Simferopol, Sevastopol and Yalta in April that year. The McDonald's Ukraine website attributed the closures to "manufacturing reasons", while the company's European headquarters described it as a business decision as a result of "the suspension of necessary financial and banking services" and stated that the closures had "nothing to do with politics". The company offered employees the chance to relocate permanently to mainland Ukraine, with relocation costs paid to them. One of the three Crimean restaurants, in Sevastopol, was replaced with a Rusburger restaurant.

=== War in Donbas ===
When Russia began the War in Donbas in 2014, McDonald's left Donbas' three main cities of Donetsk, Luhansk, and Mariupol. This made Donetsk the largest city in Europe without a McDonald's restaurant, with Mariupol and Luhansk in fourth and fifth place respectively. The vacated premises In Donetsk and Luhansk were taken over by local chains DonMac and McBurger which sold similar products in near-identical packaging. Following this, the ruling coalition in Mariupol and particularly its Mayor Vadym Boychenko invested resources into securing the return of the restaurant to the city in its Greek Square. While the general policy was supported by local opposition, the expected location of the proposed restaurant was highly contested.

=== Russian invasion of Ukraine ===
By January 2022, enthusiasm for the return of McDonald's to Donbas had markedly diminished. McDonald's closed all 109 of its restaurants in the country upon the Russian invasion of Ukraine in February 2022, with many of its workers fleeing or joining the armed forces. It additionally announced the closure of all of its restaurants in Russia on 8 March 2022. Some of the restaurants were destroyed or taken over by the Russians in places such as Kherson and Melitopol. McDonald's continued to pay the salaries of more than 10,000 of its employees.

Over the first six months of the conflict, fighting mainly shifted to the east and south of Ukraine, allowing Ukrainians to return to Kyiv and the country's western regions. Following the pull-back of Russian troops to eastern Ukraine, Ukrainian Minister of Foreign Affairs Dmytro Kuleba has since stated that he spoke to U.S. Secretary of State Antony Blinken to tell him that it would "send a powerful message if McDonald’s came back."

On 11 August 2022, McDonald's announced that it would begin reopening its restaurants in the nation "where it is safe and responsible to do so," noting a "strong desire" of its employees to return to their jobs and with the intention of "support[ing] a small but important sense of normalcy." Three restaurants in Kyiv were scheduled to open exclusively for delivery on 20 September 2022, with expanded safety protocols, to be followed by further reopenings in Kyiv and western Ukraine over the next two months. It was planned that in October, restaurants scheduled to reopen were to be able to host customers in person and through drive-throughs from 9 a.m. to 9 p.m, with closures during air raid alerts to allow for movement to nearby shelters. The September openings went ahead, with customers lining up for hours outside the doors.

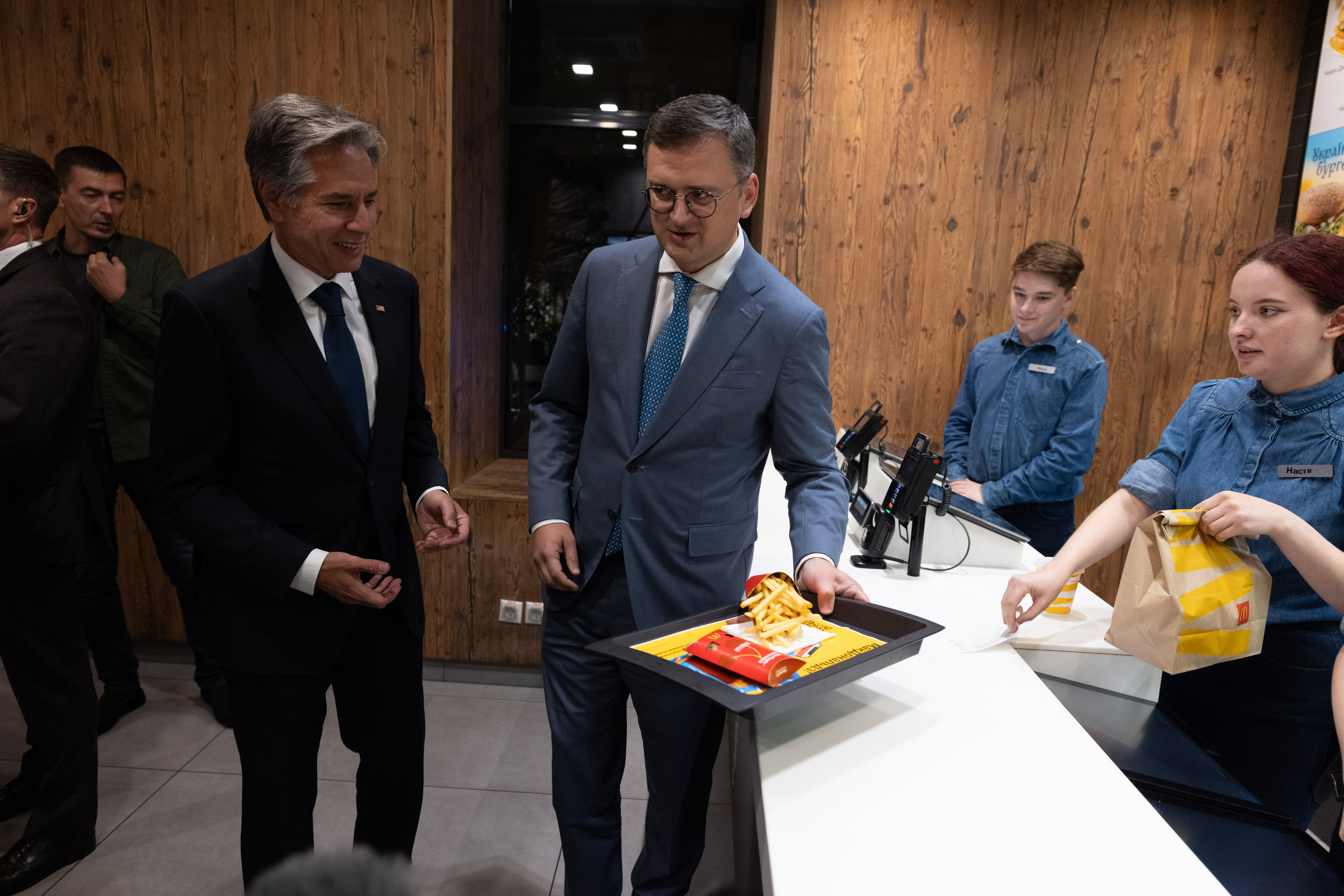
U.S. Secretary of State Antony Blinken visited a McDonald’s in Kyiv with Ukrainian Foreign Minister Dmytro Kuleba in 2023.

When Blinken visited Kyiv in September 2023, Kuleba took him to a McDonald’s. In January 2025, the original 1997 McDonald's restaurant, the first to open in Ukraine, was damaged during a Russian drone and missile strike which shattered its storefront, though it later reopened.

Ukraine's rebounding wartime economy led to the return of several Western companies to Ukraine. In May 2025, a McDonald's restaurant was opened in the remote alpine region of Transcarpathia, the only region that did not yet have a McDonald's. The company also stated its plans to open about 10 new outposts in Ukraine that year, increasing its total operational restaurants to almost 120, which was more than before Russia's invasion three years prior. City councils in Ukraine competed to secure these new establishments. Also in May, the company removed the Big Tasty burger from its Ukraine menu, causing some backlash as well as the resale of boxes of the burger online; this was halted when McDonald's announced three new varieties of the burger.

== See also ==
- McDonald's in Russia
