= Friends & Brgrs =

Finnish fast food restaurant chain

- Industry: Restaurants
- Founded: 2014; 12 years ago in Jakobstad, Finland
- Headquarters: Jakobstad, Finland
- Key people: Tuomas Piirtola (CEO)
- Products: Fast food (hamburgers • french fries • soft drinks)
- Owners: Better Burger Society Oy
- Website: friendsandbrgrs.fi/en/

Friends & Brgrs is a Finnish fast food restaurant chain, originally from Jakobstad, Finland.

== Products ==
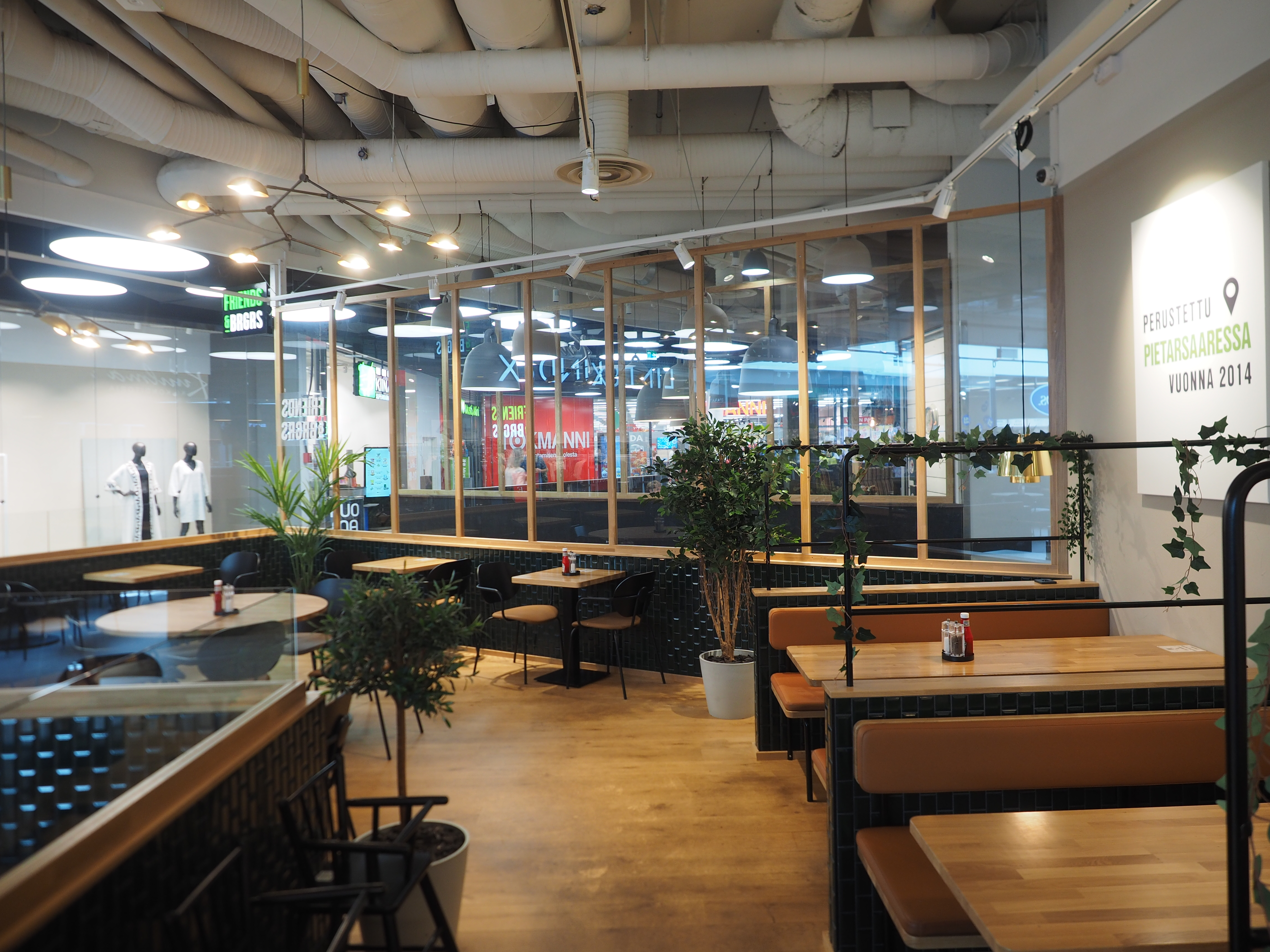
An interior view of the Friends & Brgrs

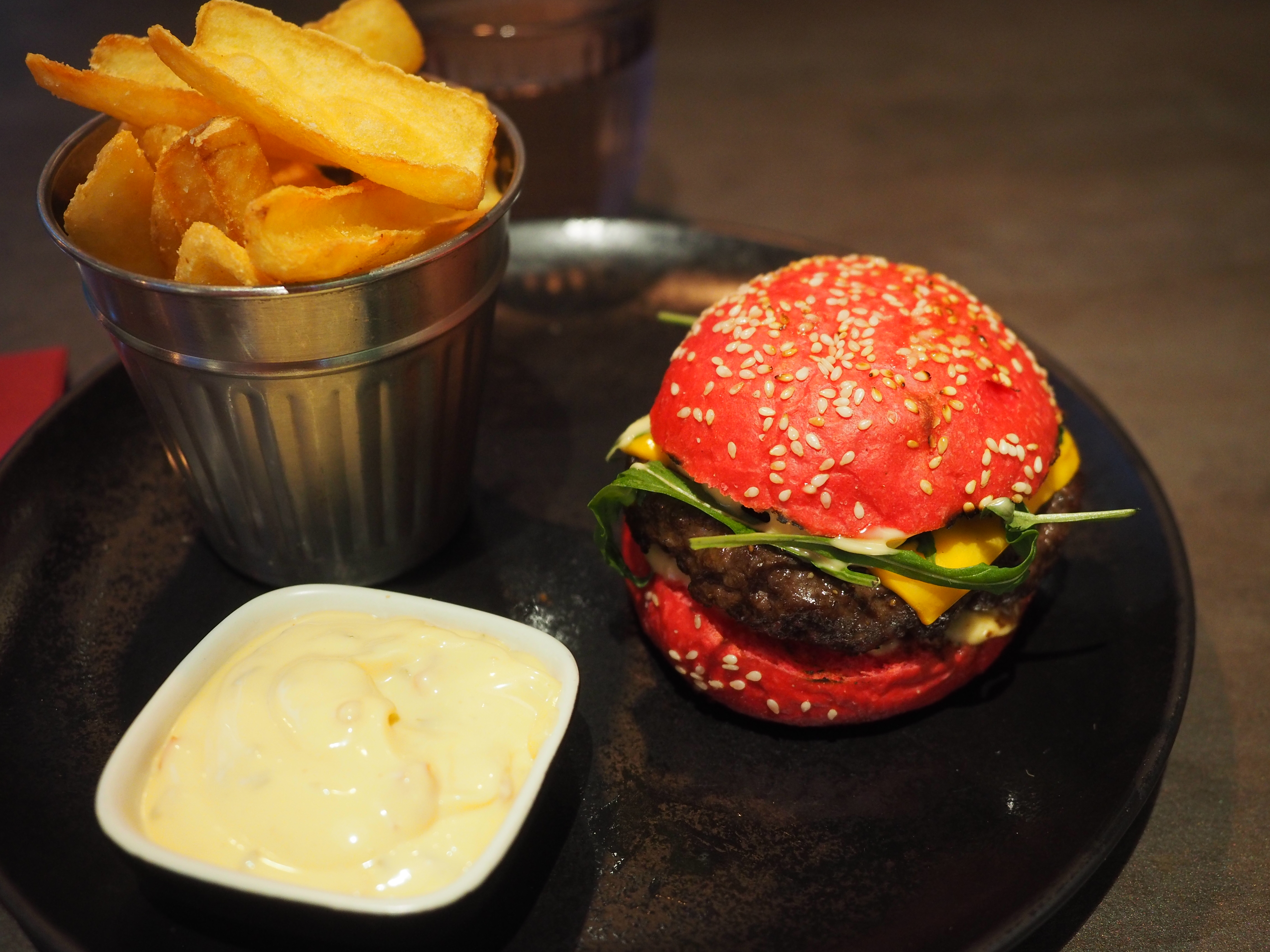
A "Parliamentary Election Burger" (a variety of the normal Dry Aged Burger with a red bun), along with French fries and dip sauce

Their buns are baked and meats are ground in the restaurants. The mayonnaises and french fries are made by the staff as well. The french fries are made with a so-called triple-cook method meaning that they are fried three times in different temperatures. The Finnish restaurant's domesticity rate is about 98%. The meals are almost fully additive-free.

== History ==
The first Friends & Brgrs restaurant was opened in Jakobstad in 2014. After that they have spread out to other cities in Finland, as well as Germany in 2017.
