= Hotcha (company) =

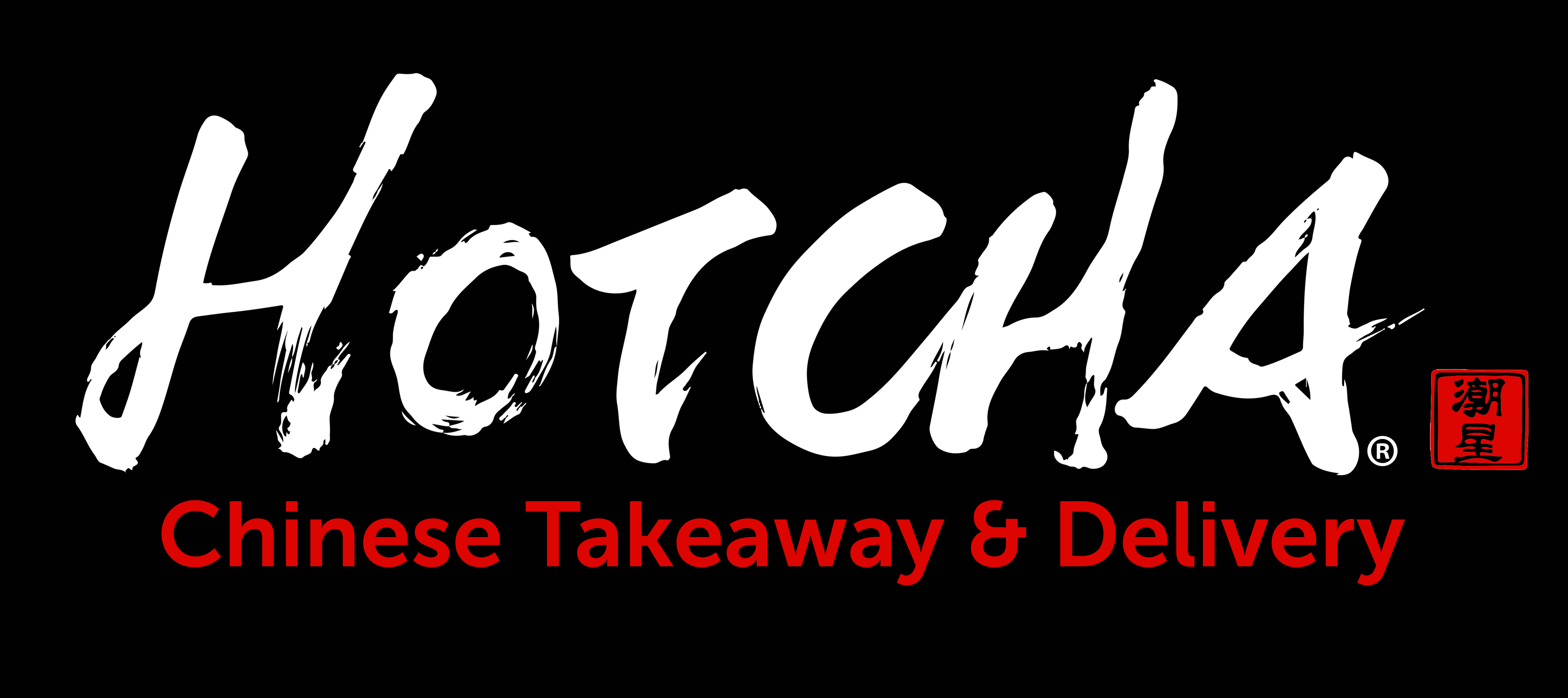
- Company type: Private
- Industry: Foodservice
- Founders: James Liang, Andy Chan
- Area served: UK
- Products: Chinese cuisine
- Website: https://www.hotcha.co.uk/

Hotcha was a take-away restaurant chain that serves Chinese cuisine. The chain was founded by James Liang and Andy Chan in 2011, and is headquartered in Bristol, England. In 2014, it was reported that Hotcha was the largest Chinese takeaway chain in Britain provided by the Tsang Corporation.

Hotcha went into administration on 18 October 2017.

== History ==
Hotcha was founded in 2011 by James Liang and Andy Chan, the two met in college and previously ran an import business until economic conditions forced them out of the market. The pair chose to start a Chinese cuisine takeaway after learning that there was no national brand occupying the market. In 2014, after opening ten corporate locations, the company announced that it planned to use a combination of franchising and company owned locations to expand its reach in the future. Hotcha generated sales of £4.5 million and began expanding into the Liverpool area in 2015. In October 2016, the company received a £7.5m investment from the Tsang Corporation to help fund further expansion. Hotcha also announced it planned on opening four new sites by year end 2016. That same year, the company was included on the Sunday Times Fast Track 100 list and its founder was included on Debrett's 500 list of entrepreneurs.

In January 2017, Hotcha opened its 13th location and announced it planned to open as many as 20 additional locations by year end. The company announced that it would move its headquarters, food preparation and distribution centre to a single Bristol location in March 2017.

In October 2017 it was reported that officers from HMRC had raided a number of Hotcha's business locations as part of an investigation into the suspected laundering of 35 million pounds.

Hotcha went into administration on 18 October 2017.
