= Secret Recipe (restaurant) =

Malaysian café chain company

Secret Recipe Cakes and Café Sdn Bhd
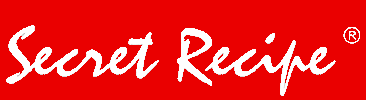

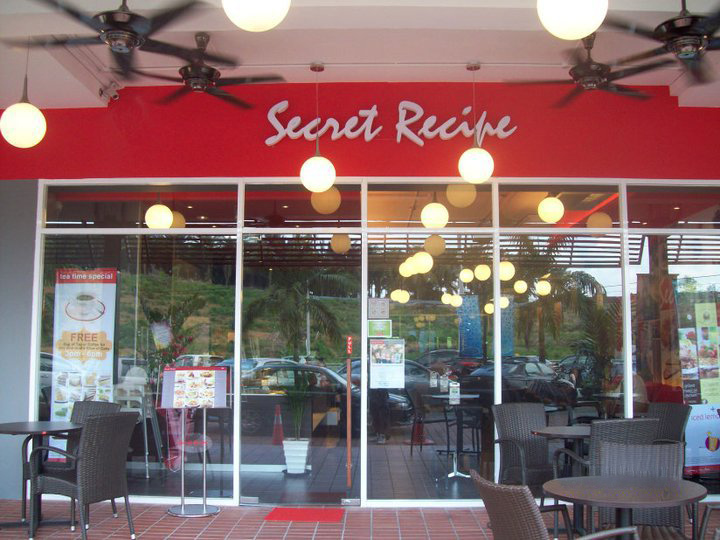
- Secret Recipe Kulim Landmark Centre in Kulim, Malaysia.
- Type: Private Limited Company
- Industry: Coffeehouse
- Founded: 1997; 29 years ago in Kuala Lumpur, Malaysia
- Headquarters: Kuala Lumpur, Malaysia
- Key people: Dato' Steven Sim
- Products: Cakes and fusion cuisine
- Revenue: RM750million
- Owners: Secret Recipe Cakes and Café Sdn Bhd
- Website: www.secretrecipe.com.my

Secret Recipe Cakes and Café Sdn Bhd (doing business as Secret Recipe) is a Malaysian halal-certified café chain company established since 1997. It has international branches in Singapore, Indonesia, Thailand, China, Brunei, Cambodia, Myanmar, Maldives, Philippines and Bangladesh. It serves cakes and fusion food in a service environment. As a leading and largest café chain in Malaysia with Halal-certification awarded by Jabatan Kemajuan Islam Malaysia (JAKIM), Secret Recipe is committed to continuing to adhere to the standards of preparation of all food and processing plants in the restaurant following the regulatory guidelines, including HACCP and VHM guidelines.

== History ==
Founded in 1997, the company has registered double digit growth for the past five years. On 15 February 2014, Fosun International, a Chinese investment company invested a total of RMB210.5 million ($30.7 million) in Secret Recipe, thus becoming the second largest shareholder in the company.

== Locations ==
Since its establishment, Secret Recipe has expanded to over 440 cafés throughout Asia: The company opened branches in Australia, but due to the high costs of starting up a franchise, the operation was ceased. Secret Recipe also plans to enter the India and New Zealand markets in the future.

Asia

- Malaysia (1997)
- Singapore (1999)
- Indonesia (2003)
- Thailand (2004)
- China (2007)
- Brunei (2009)
- Cambodia (2013)
- Myanmar (2015)
- Maldives (2016)
- Bangladesh (2017)
- United States (2022)
- Philippines (2024)

== See also ==
- List of coffeehouse chains
