= Zombies!!! =

Strategy board game

Zombies!!! Board Game
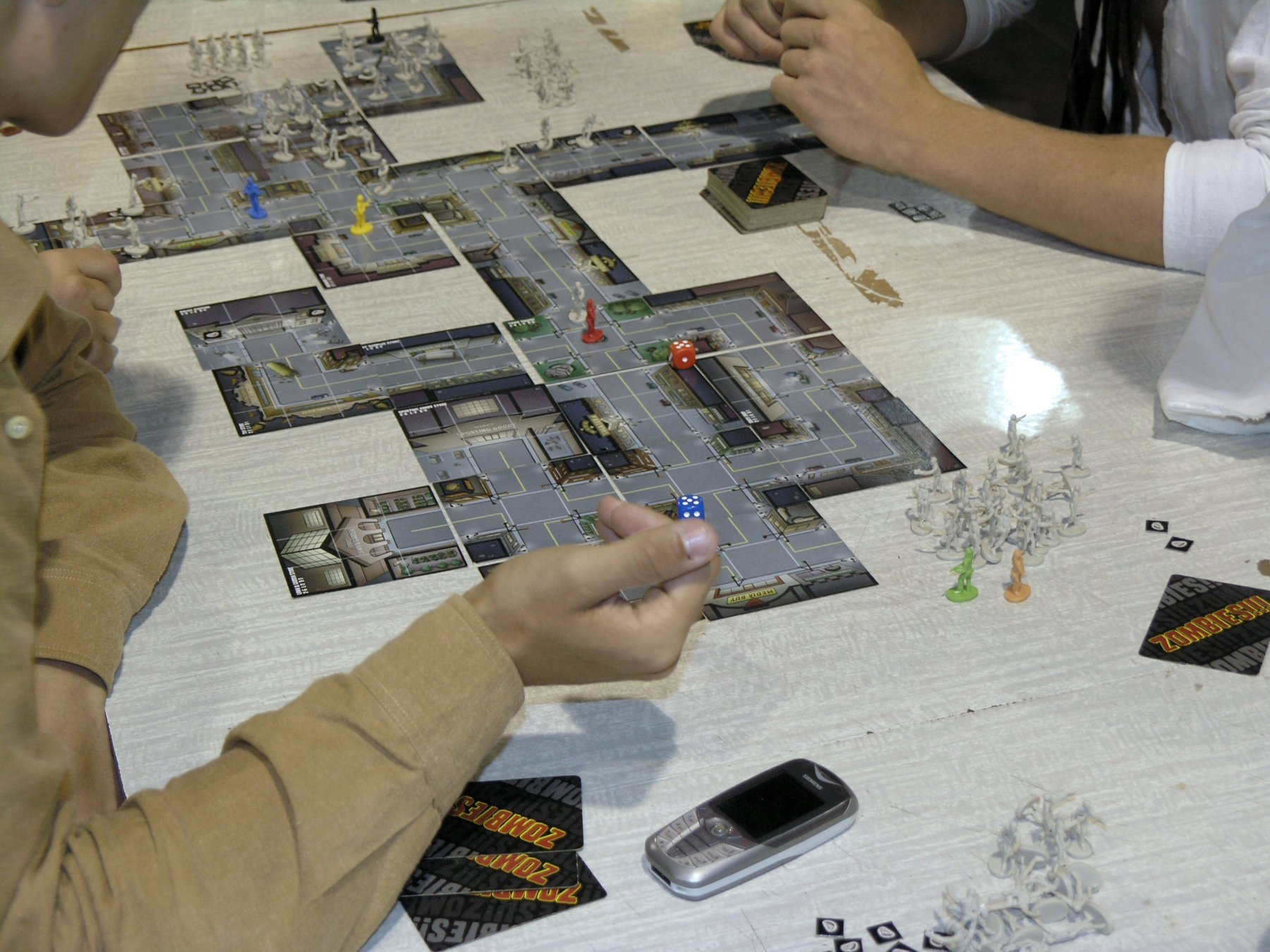
- People playing Zombies!!!
- Designers: Todd Breitenstein
- Publishers: Journeyman Press; Twilight Creations
- Publication: 2002-present
- Players: 2–6
- Setup time: 10 minutes
- Playing time: 60+ minutes
- Chance: High
- Age range: 12+ years
- Skills: Strategic thought

Zombies!!! is a tile-based strategy board game for two to six players. Zombies!!! won the 2001 Origins Award for Best Graphic Presentation of a Board Game, and Zombies!!! 3: Mall Walkers won 2003's Origins Award for Best Board Game Expansion.

== Game interest ==
Zombies!!! is an homage to zombies in fiction, particularly the zombie films of George A. Romero and Sam Raimi. The shambling movement of the zombies as compared to the players and the relative ease with which they are dispatched makes them weak enemies individually, but (as in the films) they are strong in large numbers.

Players must decide whether to avoid combat and allow the other players to dispose of the zombies for them, or to strike out and collect the various items that the board and event cards provide. Once the Helipad tile is placed, the players can choose between racing to the helicopter; holding back and hoping to rush in when another player dies; or ignoring the helipad entirely and trying to kill 25 zombies.

The event cards and the zombie movement phase also provide opportunities to hinder the progress of other players, and there is scope for diplomacy.

The game can take up to three hours to complete, which was a complaint of some reviewers—for shorter games, the publishers recommend that the Helipad tile be shuffled in among the other town tiles.

Zombies!!! feature 30 map tiles, a 50 card event deck, 6 humans, life and ammunition tokens, and 100 plastic zombies in different poses.

== Expansions ==
Below is a list of released Zombies!!! expansions.

Zombies!!! 2: Zombie Corps(e): This expansion adds a military base with 15 new tiles and 30 event cards, as well as government-enhanced "super zombies" (represented by six glow-in-the-dark zombie figures, which are harder to kill). A number of additional rule variations are introduced into the base Zombies game through the use of this expansion and the insertion of special tiles. A second edition was released in 2007.

Zombies!!! 3: Mall Walkers: This expansion adds a mall containing 16 new tiles and 32 event cards and air vent movement rules while in the mall. A second edition was released in 2007.

Zombies!!! 3.5: Not Dead Yet: An all event card expansion. Features 50 new event cards and optional deck construction rules for building customized community or individual player decks.

Zombies!!! 4: The End: Both a standalone game, or can be used as an expansion to the original set, features a forested mountain range that contains pages to the Book of the Dead. Player can try to assemble all the pages to end the zombie onslaught. Includes 30 map tiles, 50 event cards, 100 zombie-dogs, 6 human figures and life and ammunition tokens. A second edition was released March 2008.

Zombies!!! 5: School's Out Forever!: This expansion adds a school containing 16 map tiles, 32 new event cards and "Guts" tokens. A second edition was released January 2009.

Zombies!!! 6: Six Feet Under: This expansion takes players into the sewers and subways. It offers 16 new map tiles, 32 event cards, 24 sewer tokens, and new sewer rules that can be played with any set. Unlike the other expansions, all of the new map tiles are shuffled into the main tile deck.

Zombies!!! 6.66: Fill in the ____: Players can create their own map tiles and event cards using the blanks provided by this set.

Zombies!!! 7: Send in the Clowns: Now players must deal with zombified clowns in a circus. Adds 15 new map tiles, 32 new event cards, 25 zombie clown figures and is one of two expansions designed as an alternate starting location opposed to the base set's "Town Square" (usage of the base set tiles or as a starting location are optional).

Zombies!!! 8: Jailbreak: Set in a penitentiary. Players must face the hardships of prison-rules zombie combat. Adds 16 new map tiles, 32 new event cards, introduces new universal "Dodge" rules and is one of two expansions designed as an alternate starting location opposed to the base set's "Town Square" (usage of the base set tiles or as a starting location are optional).

Zombies!!! 9: Ashes to Ashes: This expansion adds a cemetery to be explored by the players, including a crematory. It can be played as part of the original game or on its own. If played on its own the goal is to kill the last zombie on the board. Adds 16 new map tiles, 32 new event cards featuring the new "automatic" card type and 25 zombie "kid" figures.

Zombies!!! X: Feeding the Addiction: This expansion came out in 2011. It can be played with the first game. It comes with 15 new city tiles, 30 new event cards and 6 copies of the new "addiction" cards. The newest add-on, is the "addiction cards" which when played, give the player better abilities, but also limit some.

Zombies!!! 11: Death Inc.: This Expansion was released in 2012. It can be as a standalone game or with the original game. It comes with 26 new map tiles, 30 new event cards, 8 "pulling strings" cards, 6 player pawns, life (heart) tokens, bullet tokens, 2 dice, 8 director tokens, 1 Zombie CEO, 100 office worker Zombies, and an instructions sheet.

Zombies!!! 12: Zombie Zoo: This expansion was released in 2013. It comes with 14 new map tiles, 30 new event cards, rules, lock tokens, and 90 new Zombie Animals: Lions, tigers, polar bears, hyenas, monkeys and gorillas.

Zombies!!! 13: Defcon Z: This expansion was released in 2014 after a successful Kickstarter campaign. It can be played as a standalone game or with the original game. It comes with 30 new map tiles and 50 new event cards.

Zombies!!! 14: Space Bites: This expansion was released in 2015. It is a standalone game set in a space station. Unlike other expansions, all of the map tiles are set up prior to play beginning. Other modifications to existing rules and new rules specifically for play within this expansion are also introduced. It comes with 16 new space station tiles, 30 new event cards and 9 dice.

Zombies!!! 15: Another One Bites The Dust: This expansion was released in 2017. It adds desert tiles and thirst rules. It comes with 15 new desert tiles, 32 new event cards and water tokens.

Zombies!!! - Deadtime Stories: It is a story-driven expansion. It comes with 10 character cards, 24 experience cards, 30 scenario cards and zombie stat reference cards. Include new rules to combine and merge Humans!!! and Martians!!! games.

Zombies!!!: Vegas: It adds mini-game rules. It comes with 24 map tiles, 54 event cards, 30 mini game cards, 6 human figures, heart and bullet tokens, dice and 100 zombies in 4 different poses (Elvis, Penn/Teller, Showgirl and Card Dealer). .

Zombies!!!: Museum of Weird: It comes with 15 map tiles, 30 event cards, conveyor and brain tokens.

== Spinoffs ==
The following are all fully stand-alone games spin off from the original game. Core game play elements are shared, so they can be integrated with Zombies!!!.

Humans!!!: This game is playable by itself but also allow you to incorporate it into a game of Zombies!!!. The game is played from the perspective of the zombies where your goal is to eat humans. These humans can also be other players.

Martians!!!: This game allows you to be dropped into an alien invasion. It can be played with all Zombies!!! and Humans!!! games to add aliens to the enemies a player must fight. Recommended 4 to 6 players; Game includes 32 map tiles, 50 Action cards, character cards, chits, dice, and 100 Martians. Recommended play time is between 60 and 180 minutes. Released in 2009.

MidEvil: Another stand-alone game in which the players must battle skeletons in medieval times (see Army of Darkness). This game also has an expansion (Castle Chaos), with another (Subterranean Homesick Blues) released in December 2007. The tiles are marked as in other expansions of Zombies!!!, but there are no listed rules on how to combine it into the original game.

== Editions ==
=== Second edition ===
The Zombies!!! core set and expansions 2, 3, 4 and 5 have been refreshed with second editions. Typical changes found in all of these second editions include improved tile and event card artwork and graphics and refined wording for both event cards and rules. The core set received the most drastic update and has been appropriately denoted as the "Director's Cut" in box cover art. In addition to the general second edition updates, the heart tokens now have a red background opposed to the black background that both heart and bullet tokens shared in the original edition; female zombie figures have been added among the original male zombie figures; and the entire set is supplied in a deeper box designed to hold additional components from expansions. The core set second edition was released June 2006. A second edition for Zombies!!! 3.5: Not Dead Yet, a card-only expansion, is available as of November, 2007.

=== Third edition ===
Only the Zombies!!! core set has been refreshed with third edition. It includes a new rules for competitive, cooperative, team and scenario play, and new "door" and "survivor" tokens.

=== 20th anniversary edition ===
Only the Zombies!!! core set has been refreshed with the 20th anniversary edition. It includes thicker map tiles, 3D hearts and bullets, 36 dice cards with custom sleeves, and a 3D helicopter.

== Soundtrack ==
In April 2016, Twilight Creations announced that it was teaming up with the gothic horror instrumental group, Midnight Syndicate to create the first official soundtrack to the Zombies!!! game. Midnight Syndicate's previous tabletop game soundtracks included the 2003 official role-playing game soundtrack to Dungeons & Dragons. The soundtrack was released in September 2016 and was nominated for Best Gaming Accessory at the 2017 ENnie Awards.

== Paraphernalia ==
Bag O–A line of figurine expansions that includes the Bag O' Zombies, Babes, Dogs and Clowns. Glow-in-the-dark versions for each aforementioned Bag O' are also available. Bag O' sets contain 100 figures each, except for the clowns which are 50 per bag.

== Video game ==
Twilight Creations published a video game adaptation of the board game with developer Babaroga for Windows Phone 7 and Windows 8.

== Reviews ==
- Pyramid
- Rue Morgue #30
- Backstab #37

== See also ==
- Mmm ... Brains!
