= Stag (card back design) =

Card back design printed between 1927 and 1943

Stag (no. 69)
- Stag Back
- Designer: Capitol No. 188
- Publisher: Capitol No. 188
- Release date: 1927
- Type: Nature-theme
- Deck: 52 cards
- Related backs: Leaf ("Oak Leaf")

Beginning about 1927, Capitol No. 188, a brand of what is now the United States Playing Card Company, produced playing cards with Stag (no. 69) backs, in red and blue. When Capitol ceased card production in 1928, the Stag design, then popular, transferred in ownership to Bicycle Cards, also a brand of the USPCC, where it remained in print until 1943.

From about 1900, card manufacturers began the production of nature-themed playing cards, namely those featuring game animals. This theme saw rapid expansion and was successful in the card-making business around this time. Stag, depicting stags (male elk or deer), deviates from the norm of Bicycle design, often comprising bicycles and cycling-related or mechanical elements. The introduction of Stag followed the c. 1925 abandonment of brown and green card back designs, which were unpopular, for more appealing red and blue designs.

The value of Stag cards varies primarily from the condition of cards and the completeness of decks. Decks still encased in their boxes, though rare, are valued in excess of US$100 despite a long print run.

== Background ==
=== Bicycle Cards (No. 808) ===
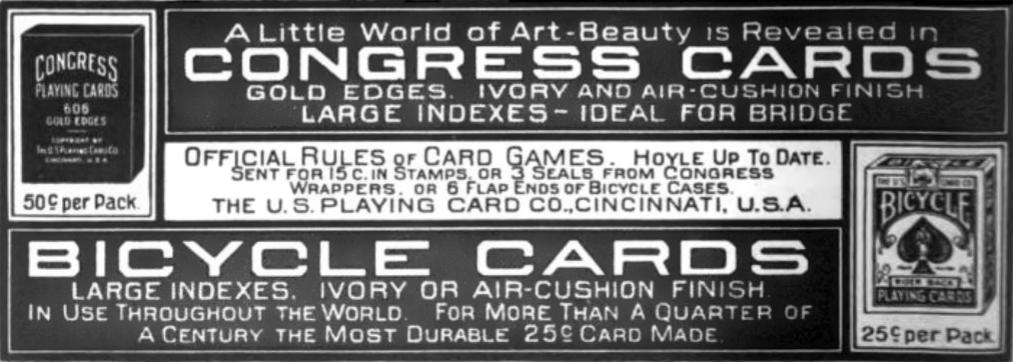
A Congress gold edges (no. 606) and Bicycle Cards (no. 808) advertisement from 1910

In January 1867, printers Robert Morgan and A. O. Russell, and partners John Robinson and James Armstrong, acquired the Enquirer Job Printing Rooms, the first two stories of a building on 20 College Street, in Cincinnati, Ohio. The business was named Russell, Morgan & Co., and in 1872 it was relocated to downtown Cincinnati, where it could accommodate more printing demands.

Playing cards became of interest to the company in 1881, and by request, began printing them in numbers upwards of 1,600 per day. The brands Tigers (no. 101), Army and Navy (no. 303), Sportsman's (no. 202), and Congress (no. 404) (Note: Congress was branded under No. 404 and No. 606, the latter denoting the inclusion of gold edges for their playing cards.) began printing around this time. (Note: The brand Sportsman's is known as Sportsman by Pierson (2018c).) In 1885, Russell, Morgan & Co. employees were inquired about naming a new brand to encompass their playing cards. By popular choice, the brand was named Bicycle for the bicycle, then a new fad in the United States. By 1900, the company required more space, and transferred its business to a factory in Norwood, Ohio. Bicycle Cards is now one of the largest card-making brands in the United States, and Russell, Morgan & Co. is now the United States Playing Card Company (USPCC).

=== Capitol No. 188 ===
Around 1886, Russell, Morgan & Co. began production of Capitol No. 188, a brand of playing cards meant to be superior to Bicycle. Cards were printed with backs of blue, buff, and pink. The brand halted card production sometime in 1928 despite being relatively upkept and popular.

=== Nature in early 20th century card design ===
Nature-related themes became common in card design beginning around 1900. These themes were evident in the cards of Sportsman (or Sportsman's), a brand of the USPCC (formerly Russell, Morgan & Co.), and Outing, a Dougherty brand. Portraits of elk or deer often circulated, and Capitol No. 188's alike depiction in Stag was not irregular.

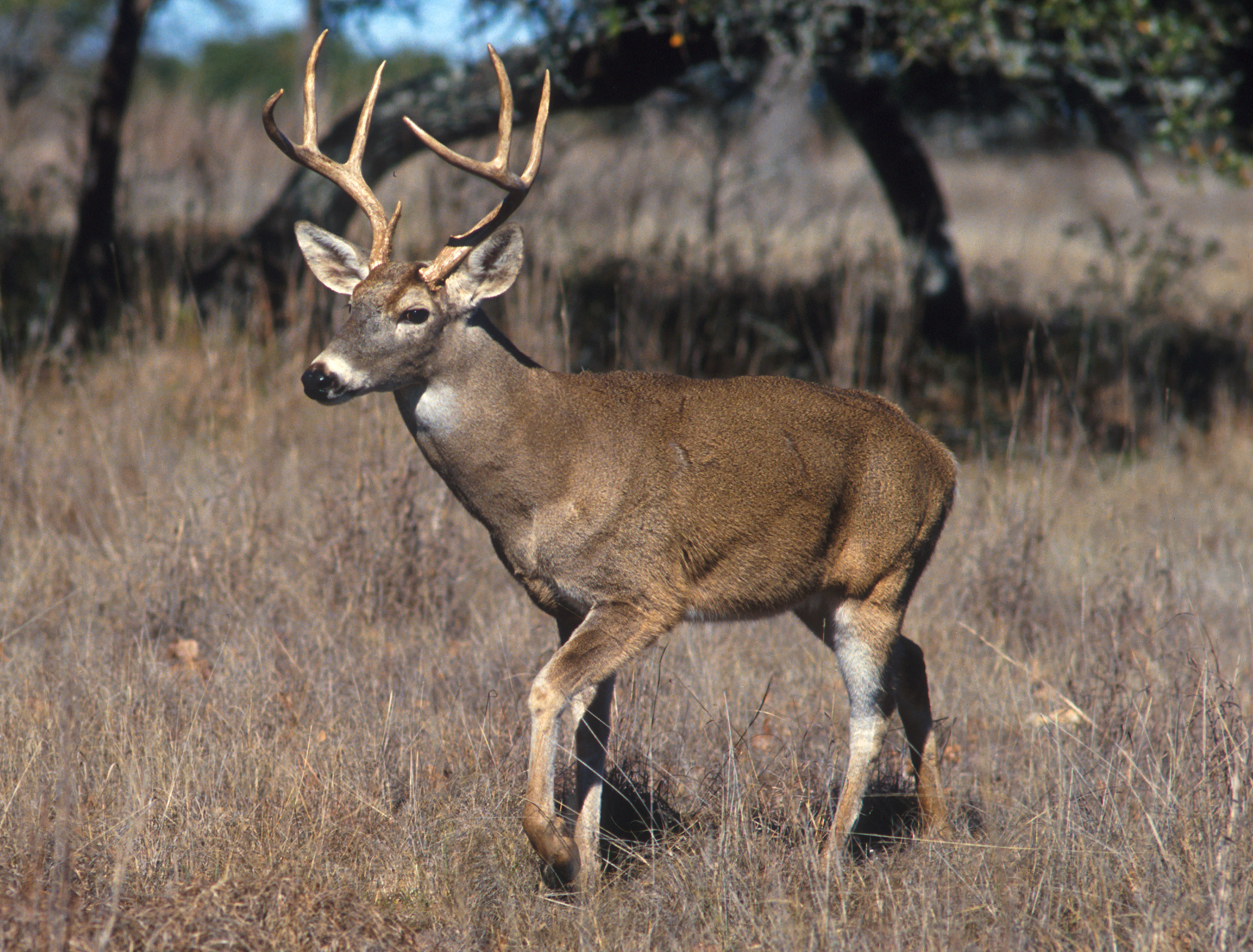

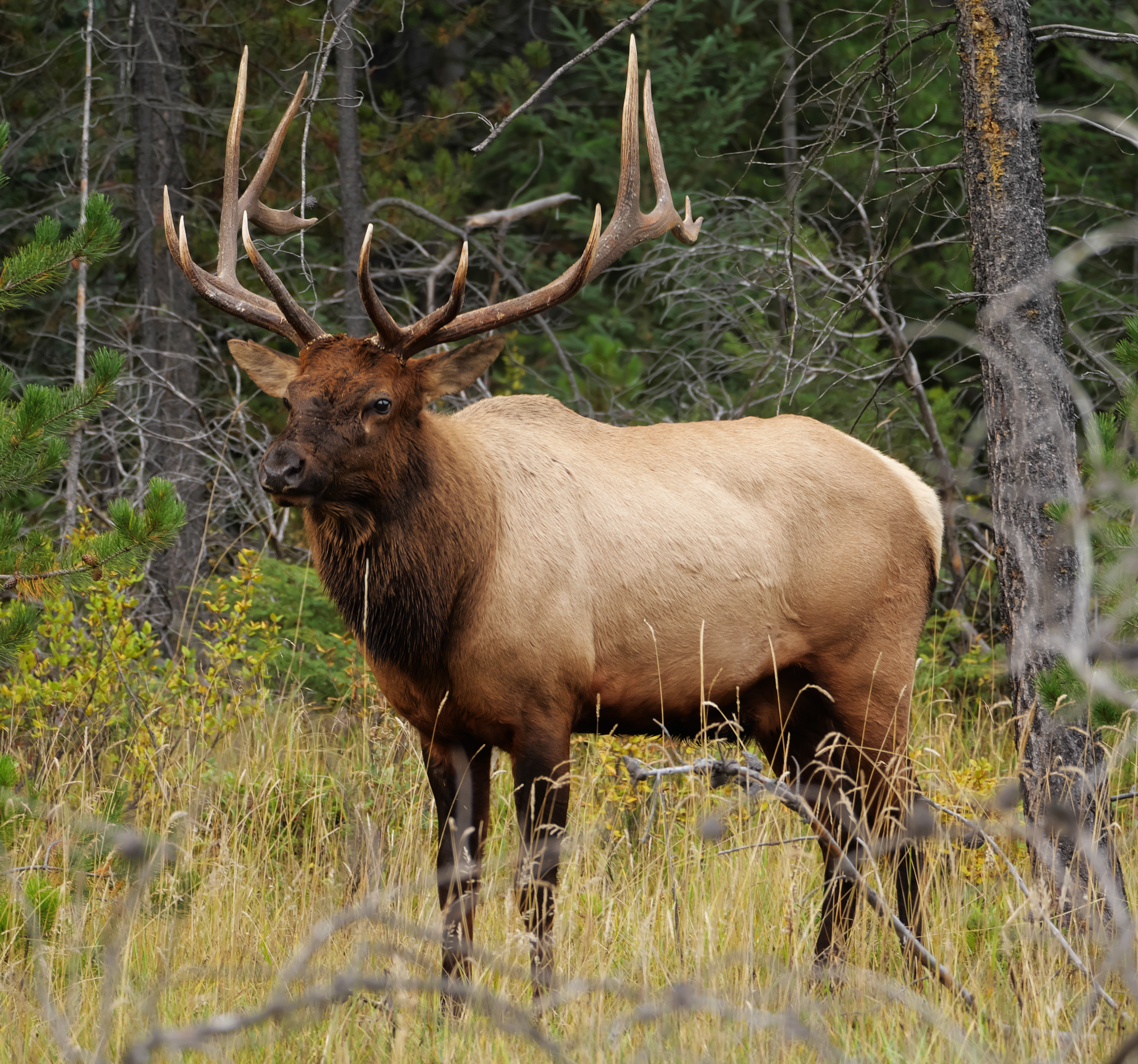
A deer (top) and an elk, or wapiti (bottom).

== Overview ==
By the 1920s, brown and green card back designs had grown increasingly unpopular among card enthusiasts. This, and shorter printings resulted in the withdrawal of these colored designs from most card brands. By about c. 1925, the United States Playing Card Company (USPCC) and its subordinate brands had also done the same in favor of red and blue designs seen as "a pleasing standard for card design", according to historic card researcher Joseph Pierson.

Around 1927, Capitol No. 188, a brand of the USPCC, released a new set of cards, named Stag, in red and blue back designs. The cards were popular, and in 1928, when Capitol No. 188 terminated their production of playing cards, the Stag design was offered again in the USPCC brand Bicycle to continue ample sales. The cards, which depicted male stags (deer or elk), were unusual for the Bicycle brand, as they neglected to portray mechanical elements typical of the brand's design. Related to Stag is Leaf (or more formally Oak Leaf), a design similar in that it fails to meet Bicycle design.

In 1943, under the circumstances of World War II, Stag ceased production under Bicycle.

=== Inclusion in contemporary books ===
In April 1955, card researcher Ruth Robinson published a pamphlet titled, Playing Card Collector's Handbook and subtitled, Description and List, Bicycle Brand Playing Cards. (Note: Although Ruth Robinson titled the publication as a handbook, Pierson uses both handbook and pamphlet interchangeably. According to Merriam-Webster, a pamphlet is defined as an "unbound printed publication", and one with a paper cover, while a handbook is defined as a "concise reference book covering a particular subject". In this instance, both terms would apply given the structure and contents of the publication.) The publication, though written and published with a number of notable errors, comprised a numbering system relevant to the collecting of Bicycle card back designs. In this pamphlet, Stag is listed as number (no.) 69. A silhouette of the design was also included. The following is the original description from page 40:

"69. STAG / Red Blue"

— description of Stag (no. 69) from the Playing Card Collector's Handbook by Ruth Robinson

== In collecting ==
External images
- Recreated colored depictions of Stag Bicycle cards (via Joseph Pierson's Bicycle, Playing Cards for Collectors website)
- Historic playing cards with backs similar to Stag (via Joseph Pierson's Bicycle, Playing Cards for Collectors website)

Stag decks are generally valued at over US$100 with their original packaging. However, decks with boxes intact are uncommon, and those in good condition are exceptionally rare.
