= Naipes Heraclio Fournier =

Spanish playing card manufacturer

Naipes Heraclio Fournier S.A.
- Type: Subsidiary
- Industry: Playing card manufacturer
- Founded: 1870
- Headquarters: Vitoria, Spain
- Products: playing cards, game sets, advertising cards
- Parent: Cartamundi
- Website: www.nhfournier.es

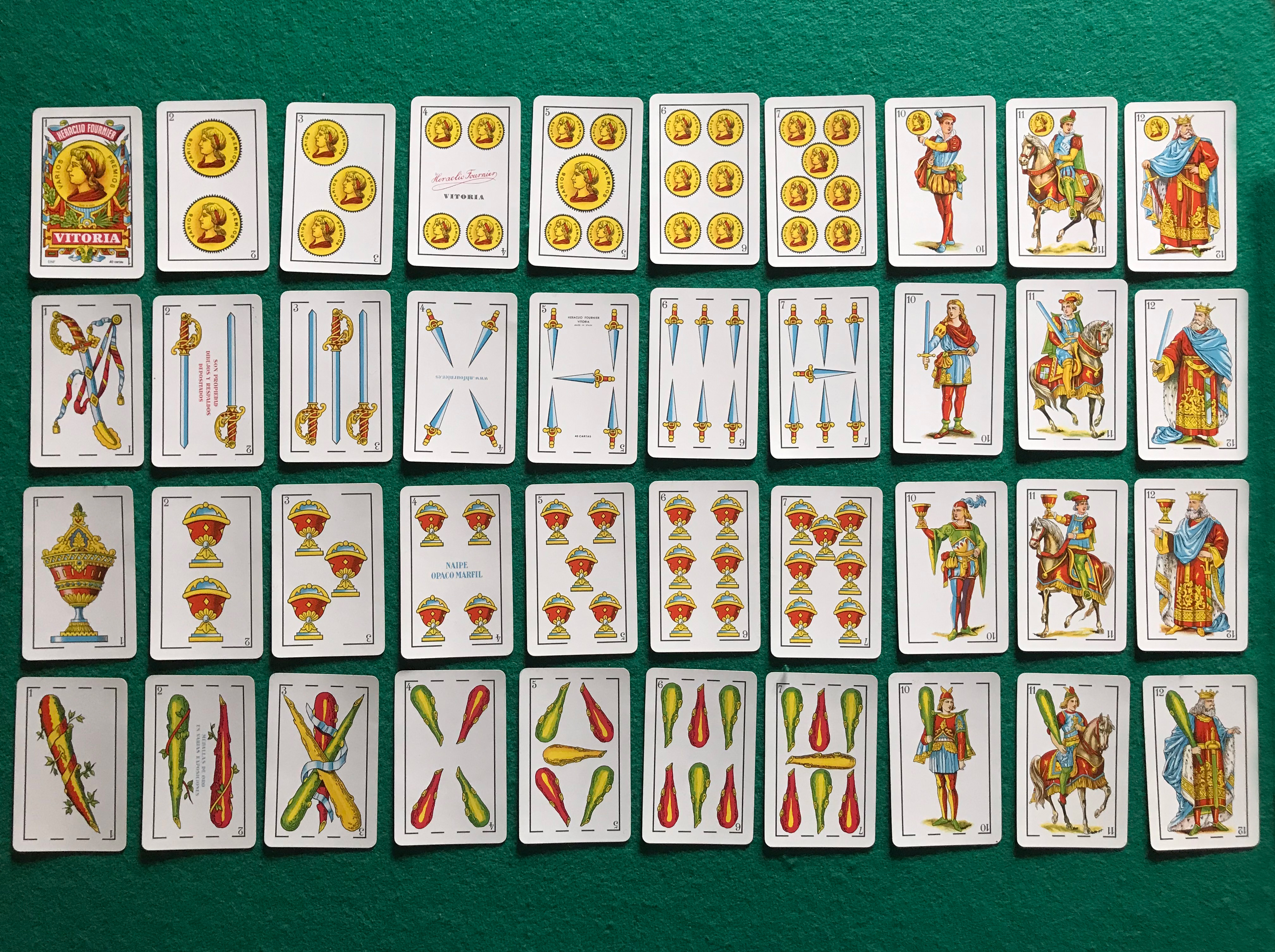
Deck of Fournier Spanish-suited cards

Naipes Heraclio Fournier S.A. is a playing card manufacturer based in Vitoria, Spain, with a factory in Legutio. It has been owned by the United States Playing Card Company since 1986, which was acquired by Belgium–based Cartamundi in 2020.

== History ==
Heraclio Fournier González, the youngest son of French-Spanish industrialist Lazaro Fournier and Paula González, went to work with his brother Braulio Fournier in the family's factory. Their business, called Fournier Hermanos, developed a new type of playing card.

After splitting from the company, Heraclio moved to Vitoria-Gasteiz and in 1870 created a lithography factory called "Naipes Heraclio Fournier" focusing on playing card manufacturing, and later printing stamps and books.

In 1875 Heraclio created new printing ways and new graphic models. Two years later he worked with a Spanish art teacher called Emilio Soubrier and a painter called Diaz de Olano to design a new brand of playing cards. That was going to be the first brand of his famous Spanish playing cards. In 1880 he changed his workplace to a bigger one on Fueros Street.

The next year he travelled frequently to France to improve his manufacturing. In 1889 he won a prize in the Exposition Universelle of Paris. One year later, he decided to change his actual playing cards to a new deck with 12 different colours. After the changes, he won many prizes in Paris, Madrid, and Barcelona.

Heraclio Fournier died in Vichy in 1916. Following this, his grandson, Félix Alfaro Fournier, became the owner of the company after Félix started a playing card collection. In 1970, after buying the cards of Thomas De la Rue, he opened a museum called "Museo Fournier de Naipes".

In 1948 Naipes Heraclio Fournier company was the best playing card manufacturer in Spain. In 1986 the company United States Playing Card Company bought Naipes Heraclio Fournier.

Currently, the company sells 16 million packs a year to many casinos around the world, being one of the most important playing card manufacturers in the world.

In 1986 it was acquired by the US Playing Card Company, entering a conglomerate where other brands such as Bicycle, Aviator, Bee and KEM are located.

In 1993, it continued to increase its presence in the international market. This transformation forced them to move to their current location, a large warehouse with adequate facilities to meet the growing demand. It has obtained the certificate ISO 9001 - 2000 (Lloyd's Register Quality Assurance) for the quality of the production process.

== Products ==
The company produces many different types of cards.

- Poker and Bridge playing cards: The most used playing cards in casinos. The company sells around 6 million packs a year.
- Spanish playing cards: The most famous cards of Fournier. The company sells around 10 million packs a year.
- Tarot playing cards.
- Trading cards: Fantasy art cards, children's card games, advertising themed cards, sports cards.
