= Dante's Inferno (board game) =

Dante's Inferno is a 2003 board game published by Twilight Creations.

== Gameplay ==
Dante's Inferno is a game in which a resource‑management and trading strategy game has players maneuver tokens through increasingly lucrative circles of Hell, manipulate tiles and dice effects, and ultimately race to reach the ninth circle and defeat Lucifer with a final decisive roll.

== Reviews ==
- Pyramid
- Rue Morgue #35
