= Mmm ... Brains! =

Mmm ... Brains! is a 2006 board game published by Twilight Creations.

== Contents ==
Mmm ... Brains! is a game in which a frantic, light‑hearted dice game has zombies race to grab brains, then make each other drop them until only one player still has any left.

== Reviews ==
- Pyramid
- Rue Morgue #65
