= Fournier Museum of Playing Cards =

- Museo Fournier de Naipes de Álava (Spanish)
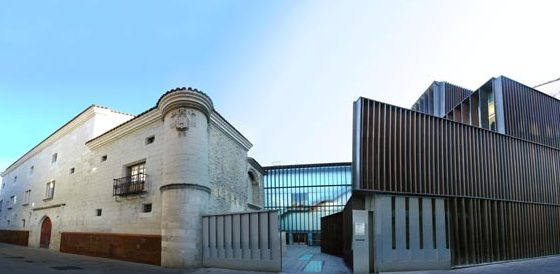

- Location within Spain
- 42.849714°N 2.671223°W
- Location: Cuchilleria, 54; 01001 Vitoria-Gasteiz, Spain

Site notes
- Website: official website

Spanish Cultural Heritage
- Official name: Museo Fournier de Naipes de Álava
- Type: Non-movable
- Criteria: Monument
- Designated: 1984
- Reference no.: RI-51-0005128

The Álava Fournier Museum of Playing Cards (Spanish: Museo Fournier de Naipes de Álava, Basque: Arabako Fournier Karta Museoa) is a playing card museum located in Vitoria, Spain. It originated as a private collection in 1916 by Félix Alfaro Fournier, the grandson of the founder of Naipes Heraclio Fournier. It was bought by the government of Álava and was declared Bien de Interés Cultural in 1984. In 1994, it moved to its current location in the Bendaña palace which it shares with the Álava Museum of Archaeology.

== Building ==
The Fournier Museum of Playing Cards is located at the Bendaña Palace, whose courtyard is the beginning of this tour. This Renaissance building was built in the first half of the 16th century. In 1525, Juan López de Arrieta ordered its construction on a piece of land belonging to his family, on the place that once was the defensive medieval tower of the old House of Maestu. Although it was built in the middle of the Renaissance, the building shows some elements of the late Gothic period, such as the pointed-arch gate of the main façade at Cuchilleria Street or the starred octagonal vault on the inner stairs. The organisation and the Renaissance decorative shapes are found mainly in this courtyard, which is a typical example of residential palaces of that time, with three floors of open arched corridors.

== Collection ==
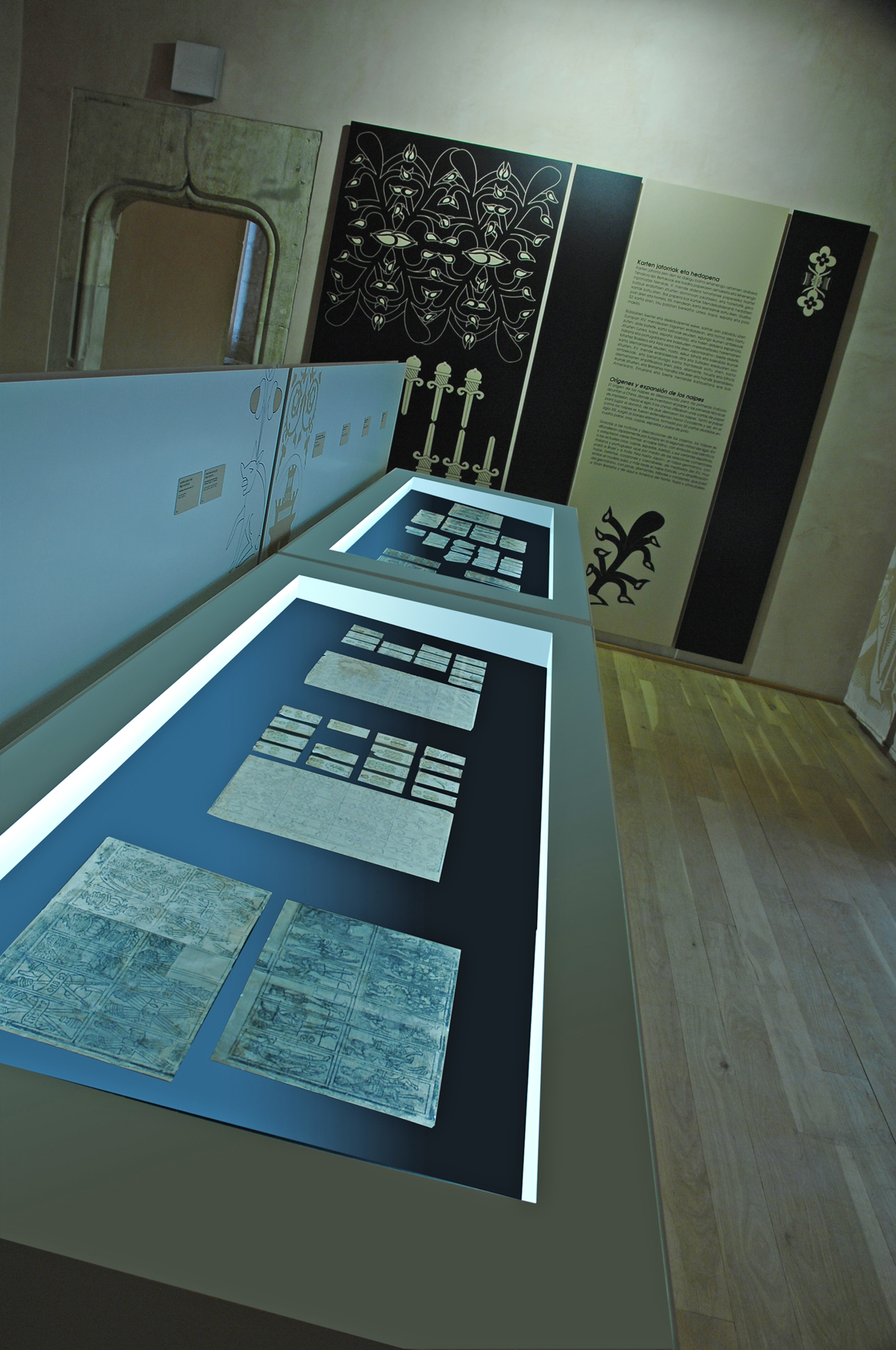
Exhibition hall, first floor

The collection of the Fournier Museum of Playing Cards was started by Félix Alfaro Fournier in 1916, when he succeeded his grandfather Heraclio Fournier in the factory after his death.

In 1984, the Alava Provincial Council purchased the collection, that at that time included approximately 3,400 decks of cards, which they exhibited at the Fine Arts Museum of Alava, located at the Augustin Palace. From that moment, the funds of the collection continued increasing and so did the necessity for a bigger space. So, in 1994, the collection was moved to the Bendaña Palace.

The originality of this museum lies with its interesting collection and on the few number of museums devoted to playing cards in the world.

The museum’s permanent exhibition is a small showing selected from among more than 20,000 decks of cards that are part of the funds, coming from different countries, from the five continents.

The Fournier Museum of Playing Cards offers the visitor not only a historic journey, but also a thematic journey showing the development of playing cards, from the 15th century to the present. Besides decks of cards, the centre also exhibits different machines and other objects used for manufacturing playing cards throughout history.

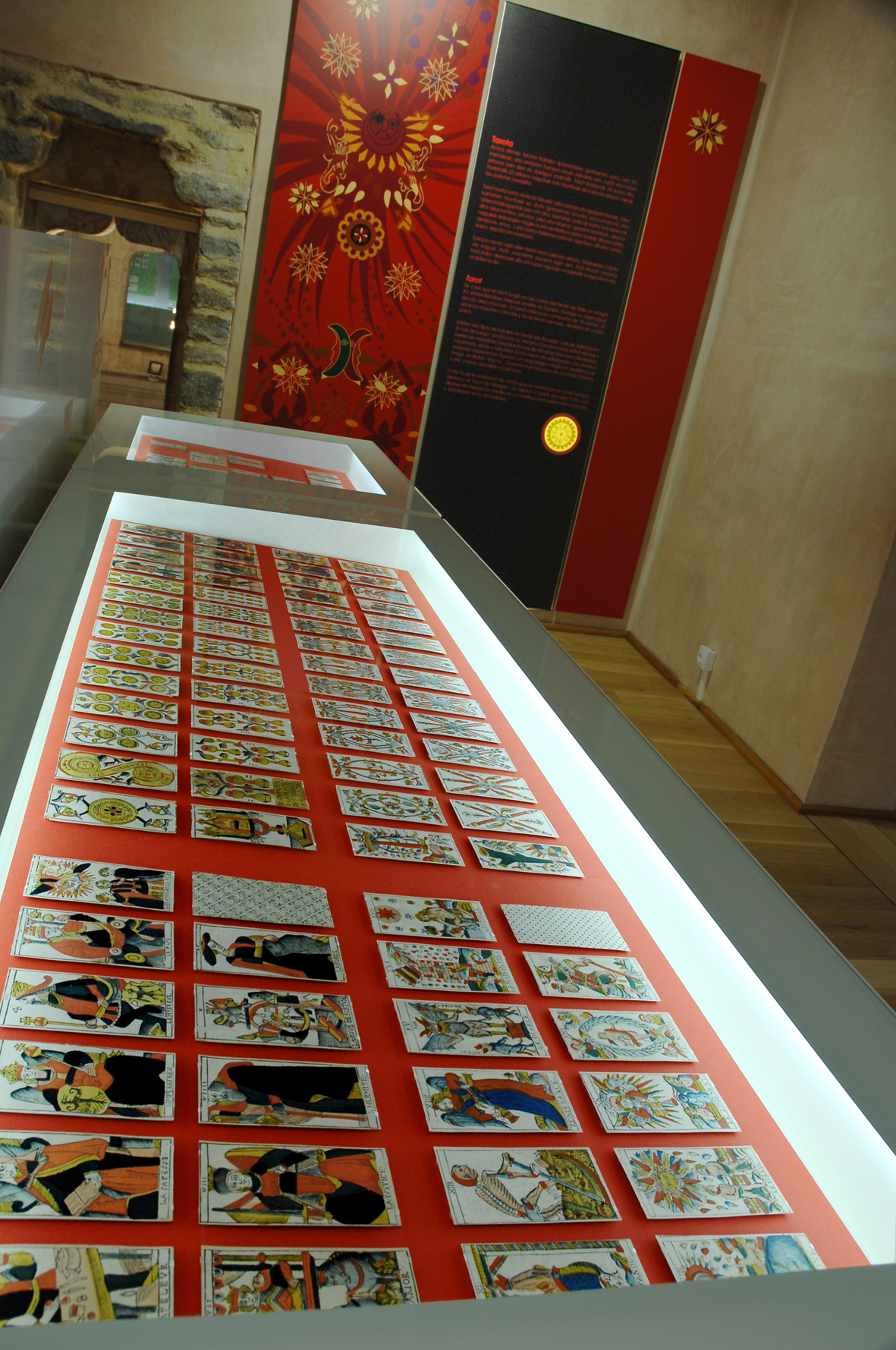
Exhibition hall, second floor
