= Bicycle Casino (video game) =

2004 video game

- North American box art
- Developer: Leaping Lizard Software
- Publisher: Activision Value
- Programmers: Chris Green, Gary Skinner
- Artists: Anthony Vitale, David Jens, Tom Kemp
- Platform: Xbox
- Release: NA: October 26, 2004; EU: March 24, 2005
- Genre: Gambling
- Modes: Single-player, multiplayer

Bicycle Casino is a gambling game for the Xbox created by American developer Leaping Lizard Software and published by Activision Value on October 26, 2004. Described by the developer as a simulation of an "authentic casino environment", the game is a compilation of casino games licensed by Bicycle Playing Cards, with an advertised 500 variations on games including texas hold'em and blackjack. The game was marketed as the first casino title released for the Xbox to have featured multiplayer capabilities using Xbox Live. While Xbox Live for original Xbox games was terminated in 2010, Bicycle Casino is now playable online using replacement online servers for the Xbox called Insignia. The game was released to generally mixed reviews, with publications praising the inclusion of online play, but critiquing the game's presentation and performance of AI players.

== Gameplay ==
A screenshot of gameplay in Bicycle Casino.

Bicycle Casino features a range of casino games played by a virtual character with selectable features. Gameplay includes local and multiplayer game modes enabled by Xbox Live, with online play including quick matches and manual sessions with custom features. Game modes include poker, seven-card stud, razz poker, Texas hold 'em, Omaha hold 'em, five-card draw, blackjack, pai gow poker, roulette, craps, slots, video poker, keno and a money wheel, including an advertised "500 variations" on the games listed. Gameplay includes selectable emotes and animated reactions from players.

== Development ==
Bicycle Casino was the final game developed by Leaping Lizard, a Maryland based developer founded in 1994 notable for initial development of Magic: The Gathering Online. The game was a partnership between Leaping Lizard and Activision Value Publishing, a budget wing of Activision. Grant Roberts, a project manager for the game, recounted that plans were made for a sequel, but "unfortunately, a publishing deal never materialised." The studio ceased operations following release of the game.

== Reception ==
Reception

Aggregate score
Aggregator	Score
Metacritic	49/100

Review scores
Publication	Score
GameZone	6.5/10
IGN	3.7/10
TeamXbox	5.9/10
Gaming Target	4.5/10
Xbox Addict	8/10
Xbox Nation	3/10

Bicycle Casino received "generally unfavorable reviews" from critics upon release, according to review aggregator Metacritic. Positive reception focused upon the range of game modes and integration of the game with Xbox Live. Tim Surette of GameZone praised the game as "the most complete casino games for a home console", stating the game "does an ample job with several types of games to play" and highlighting the online play as "more fun" and "very entertaining" with human competitors. Dale Nardozzi of Team Xbox praised the game as a "fairly complete gambling simulator", noting the inclusion of "voice chat-enabled online play" as a "real ace in the hole...which really adds a bit of real casino spice to the mixture."

Criticism of Bicycle Casino' focused on the poor visuals and presentation. Writing for IGN, Hilary Goldstein stated the game featured a "total lack of presentation" and "look meager compared to most free casino games you can find", citing the "horrid graphics" and "limited animations" during gameplay. Similarly, Russell Garbutt of Xbox Nation critiqued the "sub-par" and "downright lazy" presentation of the game, citing the "lifeless and stilted" casino environment and "total lack of presentation". Tim Surette of GameZone also criticised the "mediocre" graphics and "limited movement and static background". Dale Nardozzi of Team Xbox critiqued the game's "nearly unbearable" card size, "blocky and stiff character models" and "unimpressive animations".

The gameplay of Bicycle Casino was also critiqued by reviewers. Several reviewers noted that the game modes fell short of the 500 variations advertised in promotional material, with Glenn Wigmore of Gaming Target stating the claim was a "bold-faced lie, as only bet modifiers and game types can really change things up". Hilary Goldstein of IGN also noted that the game had "no challenge", criticising the behavior of the AI as a "constant problem" making the game "relatively monotonous after just a few games". Similarly, Tim Surette of GameZone critiqued the performance of the AI as a "bit questionable", stating "while the bots can sometimes make certain games more fun (poker for example), they can utterly destroy others".
