= When Darkness Comes: The Awakening =

When Darkness Comes: The Awakening is a 2002 board game published by Twilight Creations.

== Gameplay ==
When Darkness Comes: The Awakening is a game in which a tile‑based board game blends roleplaying and boardgaming, where players face undead threats through scenario‑driven objectives and resolve skill checks using a poker‑style dice mechanic.

== Reviews ==
- Pyramid
- Rue Morgue #31
