= MidEvil =

MidEvil is a 2005 board game published by Twilight Creations.

== Gameplay ==
MidEvil is a game in which players explore a growing tile map, fight point‑valued skeletons, and race either to collect 25 points of kills or steal the Necronomicon from the graveyard and return it to the Altar while fending off attacks from rivals and roaming undead.

== Reviews ==
- Pyramid
- Rue Morgue
