= Todd Breitenstein =

American tabletop game designer (born 1966)

- Born: March 3, 1966; Fort Thomas, Kentucky
- Died: March 24, 2013 (aged 47); Edgewood, Kentucky
- Occupation: Game designer
- Spouse: Kerry Breen

Todd A. Breitenstein (March 3, 1966 – March 24, 2013) was a table-top game designer and co-founder of Twilight Creations.

== Early life ==
Todd Breitenstein was born in Fort Thomas, Kentucky to John and Diane Breitenstein.

== Career ==
In 2000, Breitenstein was working for the game division of Cincinnati-based United States Playing Card Company. While there he conceived of a game titled Zombies!!! At the 2001 Origins Awards, Zombies!!! won "Best Graphic Presentation of a Board Game."

Breitenstein subsequently left US Playing Card Company in 2002 and with his wife Kerry, founded Twilight Creations, which was headquartered in Cold Spring, Kentucky. With Breitenstein as president, the company produced several expansions for Zombies!!!, including a new line, When Darkness Comes. He designed other games for the company, including Dante's Inferno (2003).

== Personal life ==
Breitenstein and his wife Kerry had three children. Breitenstein died of cancer in 2013.
