= Bicycle Playing Cards =

Playing card brand

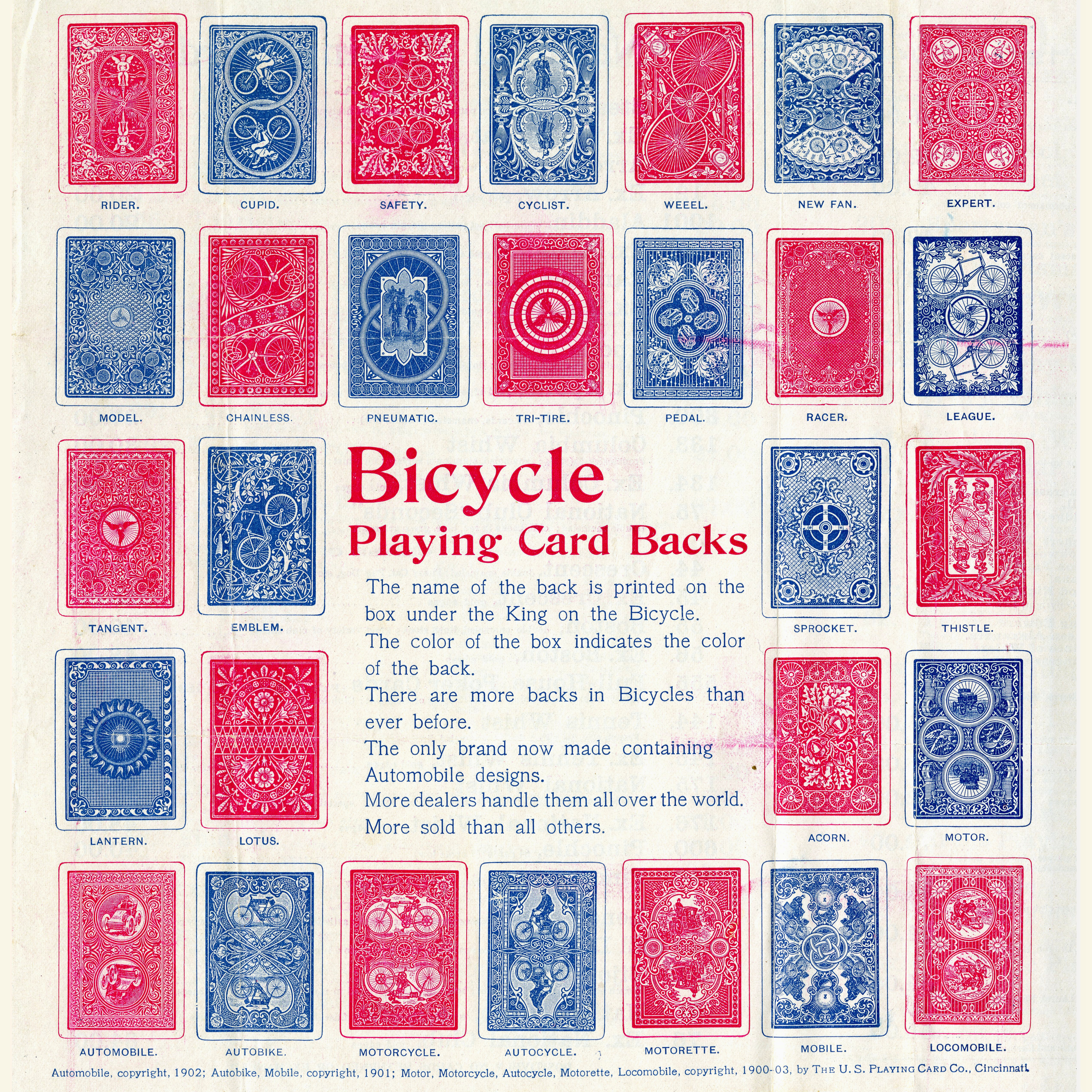
A Bicycle Playing Card price list featuring 29 different Bicycle back designs offered by the U.S. Playing Card Company in 1904

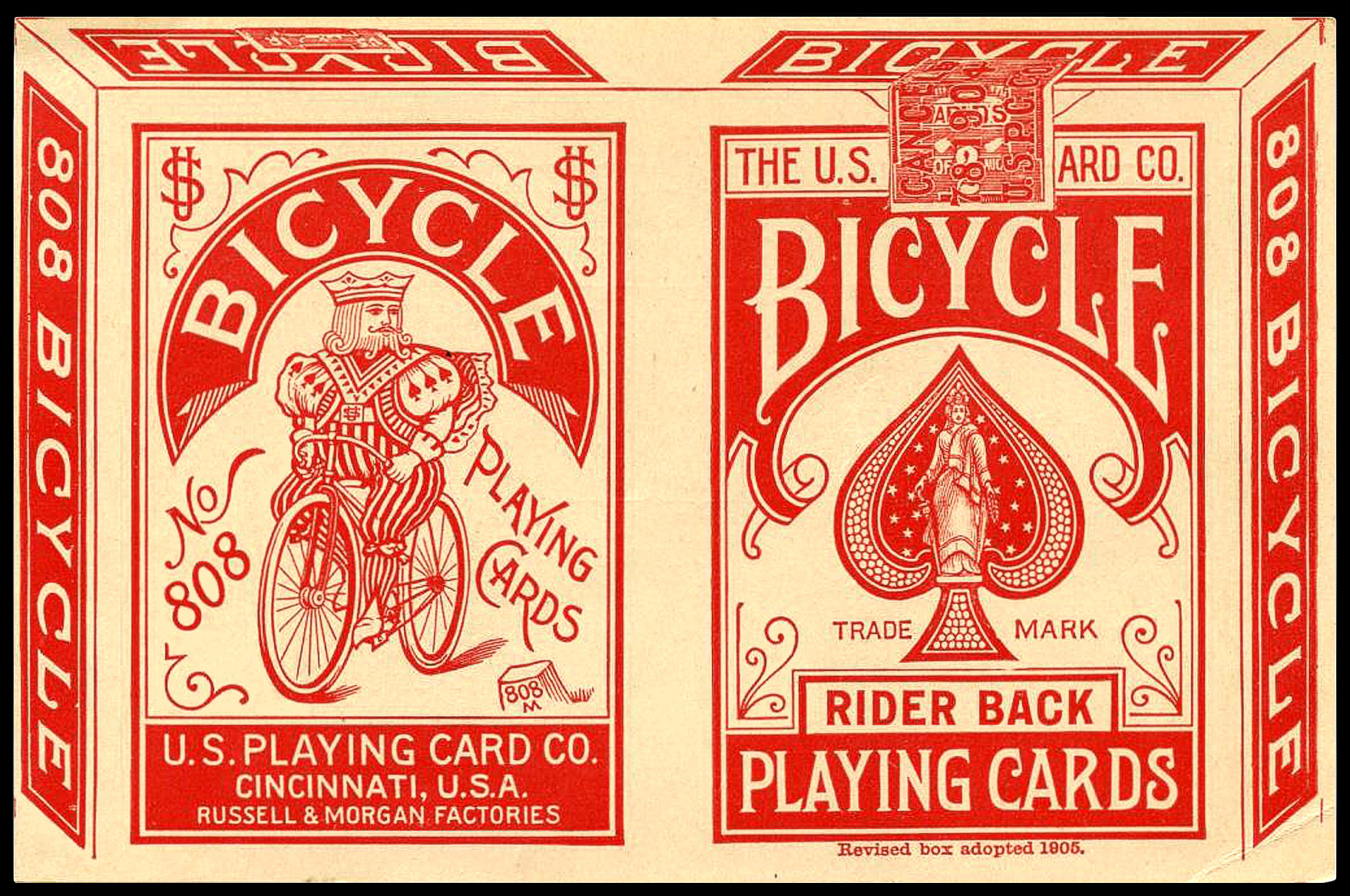
A ca. 1908 Bicycle Playing Card advertisement that features poker odds on the back

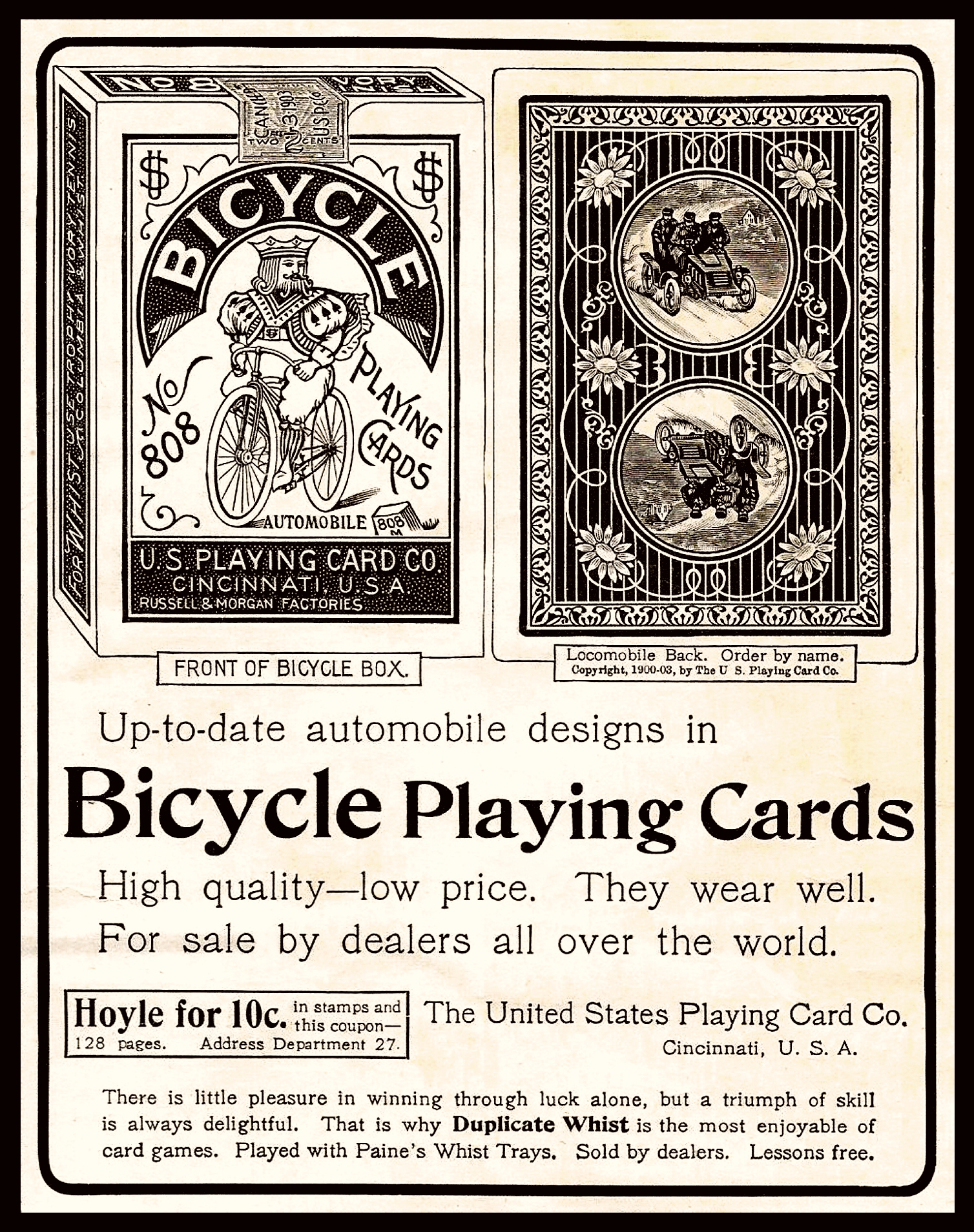
A ca. 1905 Bicycle Playing Card magazine advertisement showing the "Locomobile" back design and box

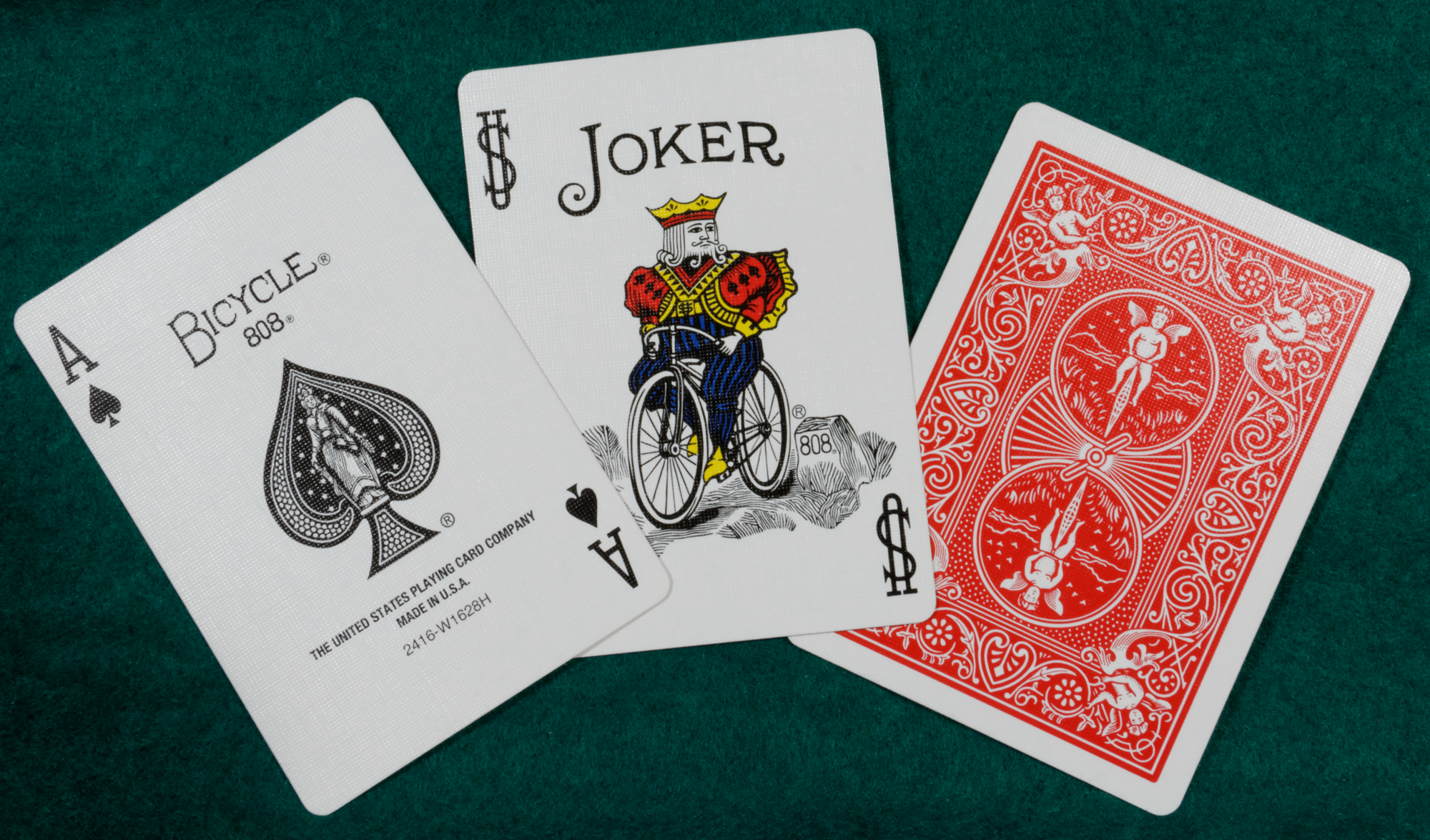
Current Bicycle playing cards: Ace of spades, joker, and the "Rider Back" in red

Bicycle Playing Cards is a brand of playing cards. Bicycle playing cards were first manufactured by the United States Printing Company in 1885. In 1894, the United States Playing Card Company (USPCC) incorporated as an independent entity from the other Russell & Morgan printing concerns. At that time, the Bicycle ace of spades first referenced the numerical designation, 808. After years in Cincinnati, Ohio, USPCC is now based in Erlanger, Kentucky. "Bicycle" is a trademark of the company and is generally recognized as the USPCC's flagship brand of playing cards.

The name Bicycle was chosen to reflect the popularity of the bicycle at the end of the 19th century. Indeed, most Bicycle back designs feature bicycles or, in some cases, bicycle parts, such as the chain, pedal, saddle, or handlebars. During the early years of the horseless carriage (1898-1910), automobiles were also featured on Bicycle decks.

== Design ==
Bicycle cards follow the pattern of the French deck, containing 52 cards (13 in each of two red and two black suits), and include two jokers. The Bicycle trademark is printed on the ace of spades. Current decks contain two advertisement cards as well.

Bicycle playing cards are sold in a variety of back designs, with the "Rider Back" design (No. 63) being, by far, the most popular. They are available with standard indexes in poker size (3.5 by 2.5 inches [8.9 cm × 6.4 cm]), bridge size (3.5 by 2.25 inches [8.9 cm × 5.7 cm]), and pinochle decks, "Jumbo Index" decks and Lo Vision cards that are designed for the visually impaired. Other types of cards with varying backs, sizes, colors and custom designs are produced for magic tricks and as novelty and collector's items.

=== Numbered back designs ===
82 different historic back designs have been produced by USPCC and sold under the Bicycle brand. Many were produced for a short period of time, and most are now obsolete and sough-after by vintage playing card collectors. What follows is a complete list of these designs.

Bicycle playing card back designs
No.	Name	Year(s) sold	Notes
1	Acorn	1891–1943	Reissued under "Heritage Design Series" c. 2012; also sold in UK (gold gilded)
2	All Wheel	1907–1917	
3	Angel	1893	Two variants produced
4	Arizona Plaid	1906–1911	Two-color back design (red/green, blue/brown)
5	Auto #1 (Locomobile)	1901–1904	
6	Auto #2 (Locomobile)	1904–1913	Also sold in British market
7	Auto #3	1913–1917	Also sold in British market
8	Autobike No. 1	1902–1906	Reissued 2017 (red, blue)
9	Autobike No. 2	1906–1913	This design was actually never released
10	Autobike No. 3	1907–1917	Reissued 2015 as "Back No. 9" (brown, green); also sold in UK
11	Autocycle No. 1	1901–1906	Reissued 2016 (green, purple)
12	Autocycle No. 2	1906–1919	Also sold in UK
13	Automobile No. 1	1903–1919	
14	Automobile No. 2	1913–1935	
15	Big Gun	1918	"War Series", army; inventory destroyed; reissued 2011 (red, blue)
16	Bird	1891	
17	Chain	1908–1910	Exclusively sold in UK; two-color back design (black/brown, blue/brown)
18	Chainless	1899–1917	Reissued 2010 as "Heritage Series" (blue); reissued 2016 (red, blue)
19	Club	1917–1969	Similar to Bee No. 92
20	Colorado Plaid	1906–1911	Two-color back design (red/green, blue/brown, blue/black)
21	Cupid - Sod	1894–1896	One-way design; reissued mid-2000s
21	Cupid - Crosshatch	1894–1943	Narrow version for pinochle c. 1918; reissued 1997 (red/gold, no box); reissued 2012 (red); reissued 2013 as "Heritage Design Series" (red); reissued as "Vintage Design" (red, blue)
22	Cyclist No. 1	1898–1908	
23	Cyclist No. 2	1908–1917	Gaff card ("STUNG!") produced by Presto Publishing and Novelty Co.
24	Cyclecar	1914–1917	
25	Diamond Plaid	1906–1908	
26	Dreadnaught	1918	"War Series", Navy; inventory destroyed
27	Eagle	1927–1943	Minor redesign in 1928; reissued as spades-specific deck c. 1995 (blue, red); formerly offered under Capitol #188 brand c. 1908–1928
28	Emblem	1890–1943	One-way back design; minor redesign in 1892; pinochle-specific version sold in Canada; "music deck" produced
29	Expert	1895–1943	Similar to Old Fan (#57); also sold in UK; reissued 2012 in Canada, distressed (green), 2013 in US, distressed (red, blue, green)
30	Flying Ace	1918	"War Series", Air Force; inventory destroyed
31	Handlebar	1908–1910	Exclusively sold in UK (gold gilded); two-color back design
32	Invincible (Conqueror)	1918	"War Series", Marines; inventory destroyed
33	Lantern No. 1	1898–1906	
34	Lantern No. 2	1906–1939	
35	League	1888–1960	Likely refers to the League of American Wheelmen; minor redesign 1893; reissued c. 1980s; reissued 1990, "No. 71 Rummy" two-deck set (purple, red)
36	Oak Leaf (Leaf)	1947–1949	Originally created as non-Bicycle "Uncle Sam" deck during World War II, ft. unbranded Ace of Spades, joker; Consolidated Card Co., Bee No. 154; reissued 2014 as "Leaf Back" on Kickstarter (red, green)
37	Lotus	1885–1943	Also sold in UK (gold gilded); 60-card "music deck" by Helen Parker Ford created 1927; Krupp's promotional version created
38	Margin Snowflake	1910–1917	
39	Margin Star No. 1	1893–1907(?)	Very similar to Philip Morris "Marlboro Texan No. 45" two-deck set (1984), a reproduction of Russell and Morgan No. 45 "Texan" playing cards.
40	Margin Star No. 2	1907–1912	
41	Margin Star No. 3	1912–1917	
42	Margin Tri-Plaid	1912–1917	
43	Mobile No. 1	1901–1906	
44	Mobile No. 2	1906–1913	
45	Mobile No. 3	1913–1917	
46	Model No. 1	1895–1907	Features League of American Wheelmen logo; similar to Racer No. 1
47	Model No. 2	1907–1927	Used as throw-out card by Eugene Laurant; reissued as two-deck euchre set in 1991, called "Mountain Bike" design
48	Motor No. 1	1901–1907	
49	Motor No. 2	1907–1917	Also sold in UK; knockoff produced by C. L. Wüst in Germany, c. 1907–1927
50	Motorcar	1906–1917	
51	Motorcycle No. 1	1901–1907	Also sold in UK; copyright 1900
52	Motorcycle No. 2	1914–1917	
53	Motorette No. 1	1901–1907	
54	Motorette No. 2	1907–1917	Also sold in UK
55	Nautic	1919–1943	Earlier sold under Army and Navy No. 3032, c. 1908 (red, blue, green, brown); modified design used c. 1924 by Peruvian Estanco de Naipes (re law no. 4936); Universal Playing Card Co. version called "Buffalo"
56	New Fan	1891–1980	Minor revision 1894; also sold in UK (gold gilded), Cuba; reissued c. 1960s as bridge-sized Congress cards (blue, pink); reissued c. 1990s (red, blue); reissued 2012 by Dan and Dave (red, blue); reissued 2011 by Coterie1902 (black/white, white/black); reissued as "Vintage Design"
57	Old Fan	1885-1894	Possibly first Bicycle back design used; Anglo-Japanese style design; "music deck" produced
58	Pedal	1899–1917	Reissued 2010 as "Heritage Series"
59	Pneumatic No. 1	1894–1908	Also used as Ide High Art Wheel promotional design
60	Pneumatic No. 2	1908–1939	
61	Racer No. 1	1895–1906(?)	Possibly produced only through 1898; similar to Model No. 1; Krupp's promotional version created for 1891 Columbian Exposition
62	Racer No. 2	1906–1970	Similar to No. 41 Vanity Fair transformation deck back design; major reissues c. 1980s, 1990s; pinochle version created
63	Rider	1887–present	One-way back corrected c. 1893; also sold in UK (gold gilded), Canada, Cuba; fireproof version produced for NASA c. 1970s; other varieties include Playboy (red, blue). 1984 Los Angeles Olympics, 1996 Atlanta Olympics, Christmas-themed cards, WWII-era aircraft spotter cards
64	Saddle	1908–1910	Exclusively sold in UK; two-color back design
65	Safety	1892–1943	Euchre-specific versions produced; "music deck" produced
66	Snowflake	1904–1918	Also sold under Army & Navy #3032 brand c. 1918 (red, blue)
67	Sprocket No. 1	1899–1905	
68	Sprocket No. 2	1905–1917	Variant Sprocket No. 2a has five rings (one-way design) instead of six
69	Stag	1927–1943	Sold under Capitol No. 188 brand c. 1908; similar to Sportsman, Dougherty "Outing"
70	Star Plaid No. 1	1906–1907(?)	Also sold under Army & Navy #3032 brand c. 1918 (red, blue)
71	Star Plaid No. 2	1907–1932	
72	Tangent No. 1	1895–1907	Tangent No. 1a features larger center wheel, reversed wings
73	Tangent No. 2	1907–1939	Design went from 3 wings to 4.
74	Thistle	1891–1931	Features the Brownies by Palmer Cox; two versions, one with grass in background, other with brick; "music deck" produced
75	Tri-Plaid	1905–1943	Also sold under Army & Navy #3032 brand c. 1918 (red, blue); line thickness may vary; used as throw-out card by T. Nelson Downs
76	Tri-Tire No. 1	1898–1905	Features logo of League of American Wheelmen; also sold in UK
77	Tri-Tire No. 2	1905–1927	Redesigned to be two-way; used as throw-out card by the Lingermans
78	Twig (Coral)	1907–1908	Called "Coral" c. 1904(?)
79	Western Plaid	1914–1932	Also sold under Army & Navy #3032 brand c. 1918 (red, blue)
80	Wheel No. 1	1887–1907	Subtle design changes over time
81	Wheel No. 2	1907–1943	Features four-winged wheel (two-way design) instead of three-winged
82	Leaf	1885	Sometimes called "Oak Leaf"

== Significance in American wars ==
=== World War I ===
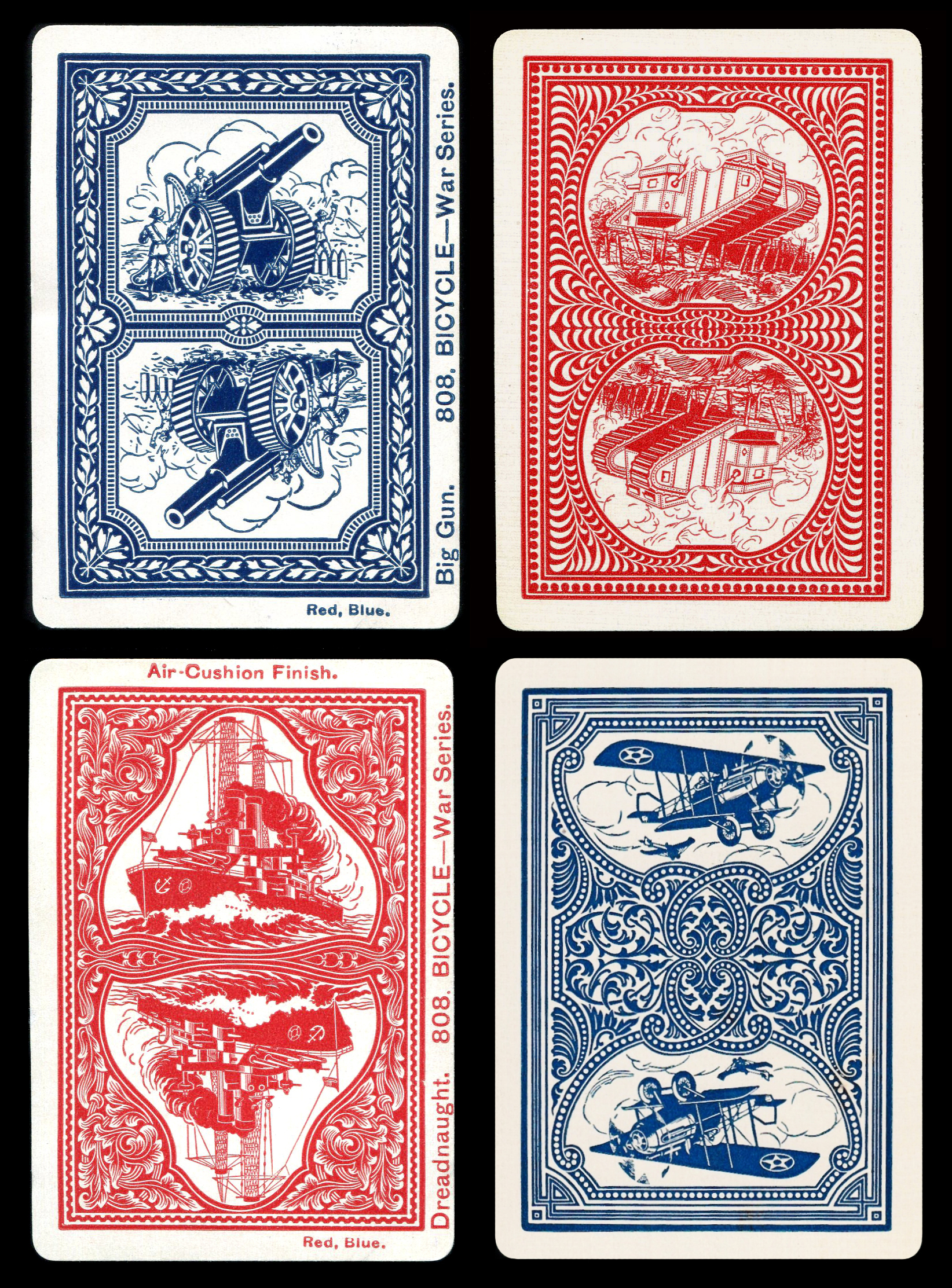
The four War Series decks issued by the U.S. Playing Card Company in 1918

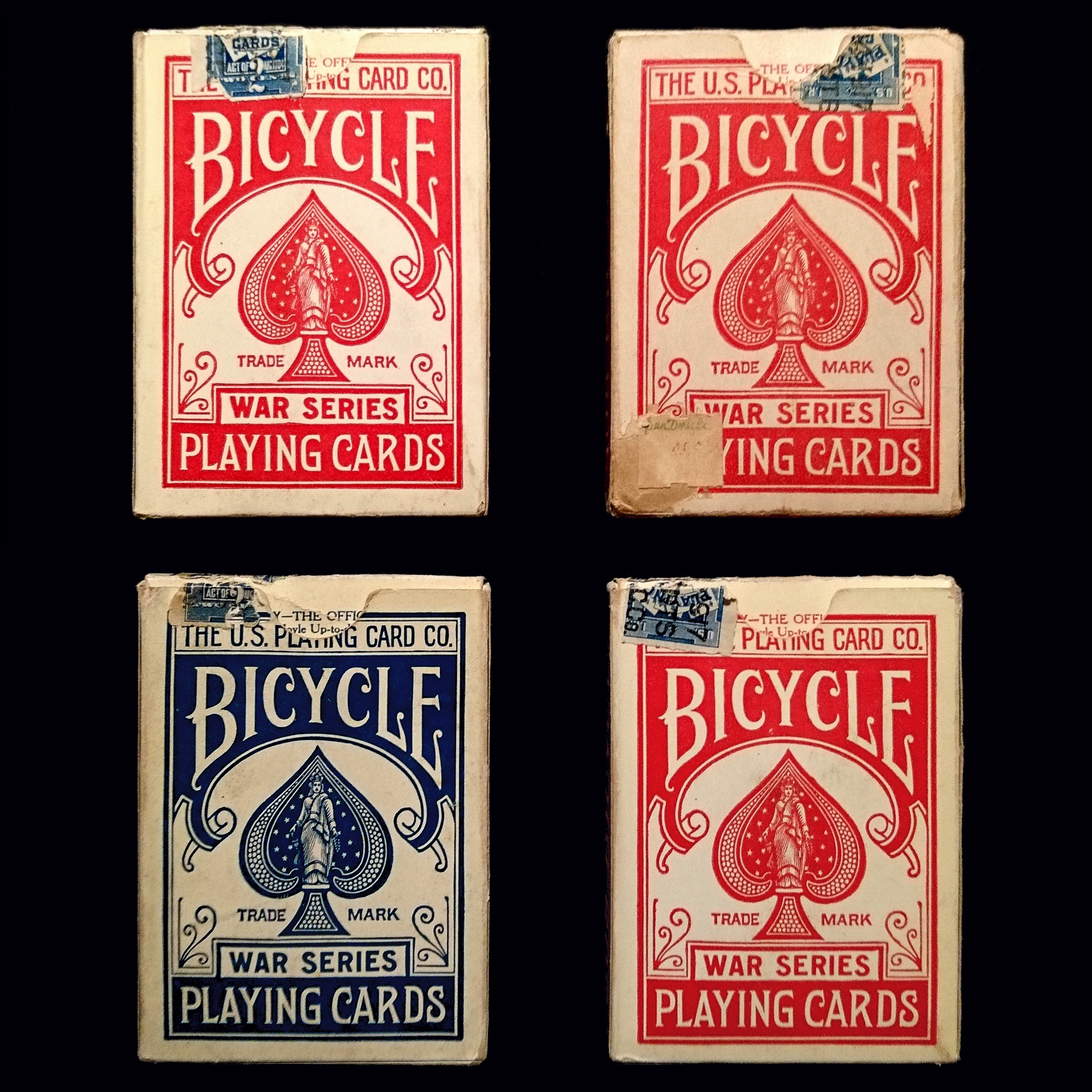
The 1918 War Series boxes (fronts)

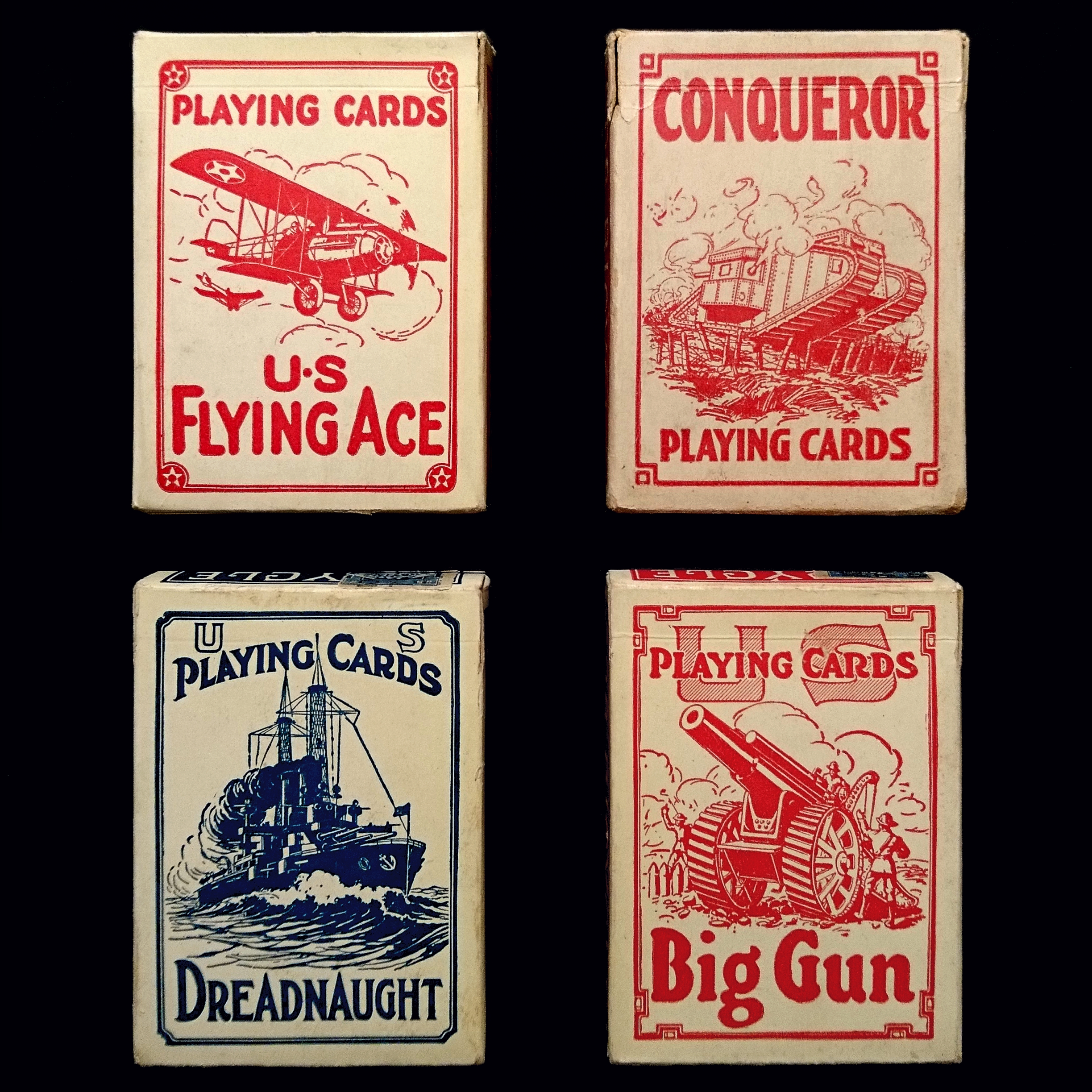
The 1918 War Series boxes (backs)

Toward the end of World War I, the United States Playing Card Company produced four "War Series" decks under the Bicycle brand to represent each of the branches of the U.S. armed services: Flying Ace for the Aviation Section of the Signal Corps, Dreadnaught for the Navy, Invincible (aka Conqueror) for the Marine Corps, and Big Gun for the Army. The decks were printed in 1917, and apparently only given an extremely limited release before being withdrawn from circulation. It is unknown why the decks were not circulated, but one theory is that they were intended to be distributed to the troops overseas, and USPCC destroyed their inventory of the War Decks when Armistice was declared in 1918. Only a handful of these decks exist today.

=== World War II ===
During World War II, cards were produced that could be peeled apart when submerged in water. Portions of a large map could be drawn on the inside surfaces, and the halves were then reassembled to form an innocuous-looking deck. These cards were supplied to POWs for use in escapes. At least one example of such a deck is known to exist, and is on display at the International Spy Museum in Washington, DC. Modern reproductions have been sold in limited editions.

=== Vietnam War ===
The company provided crates of ace of spades cards for U.S. soldiers in the Vietnam War. It was erroneously believed that the Viet Cong regarded this particular card as a symbol of death and would flee at the sight of it. In actuality, it initially meant nothing to the Viet Cong, but the belief that the enemy was afraid of the cards improved the U.S. soldiers' morale. The origin of the cards is attributed to a letter written by a Lt. Charles W. Brown in early 1966 to Allison F. Stanley, the President of the United States Playing Card Company. Brown had read remarks from Congressman Craig Hosmer of California that the Viet Cong held superstitions of bad luck with pictures of women and the ace of spades. The Bicycle design of this card featured an image of the Goddess of Liberty combined with the spade.

Upon conferring with other lieutenants, Brown asked for 1,000 aces of spades for his company to leave for the enemy to find, as an indication that American troops had been in the area. Stanley was sympathetic to the soldiers and pulled cards from the production line to send free of charge. The story was reported by several news outlets, including the Stars and Stripes; as a result, more units began to request cards.

The symbol was eventually included in the official psychological warfare operations, and thousands of special decks containing only aces of spades were donated by the card company to soldiers that purposely scattered them throughout the jungle and villages during raids.

Similar cards were produced during the Gulf War in 1991, immediately prior to the invasion of Iraq by US forces. Due to the short duration of the conflict, these cards never saw battle.

== See also ==
- Bicycle Casino, a Bicycle-branded video game
