= Frank H. Murray =

American executive (born 1953)

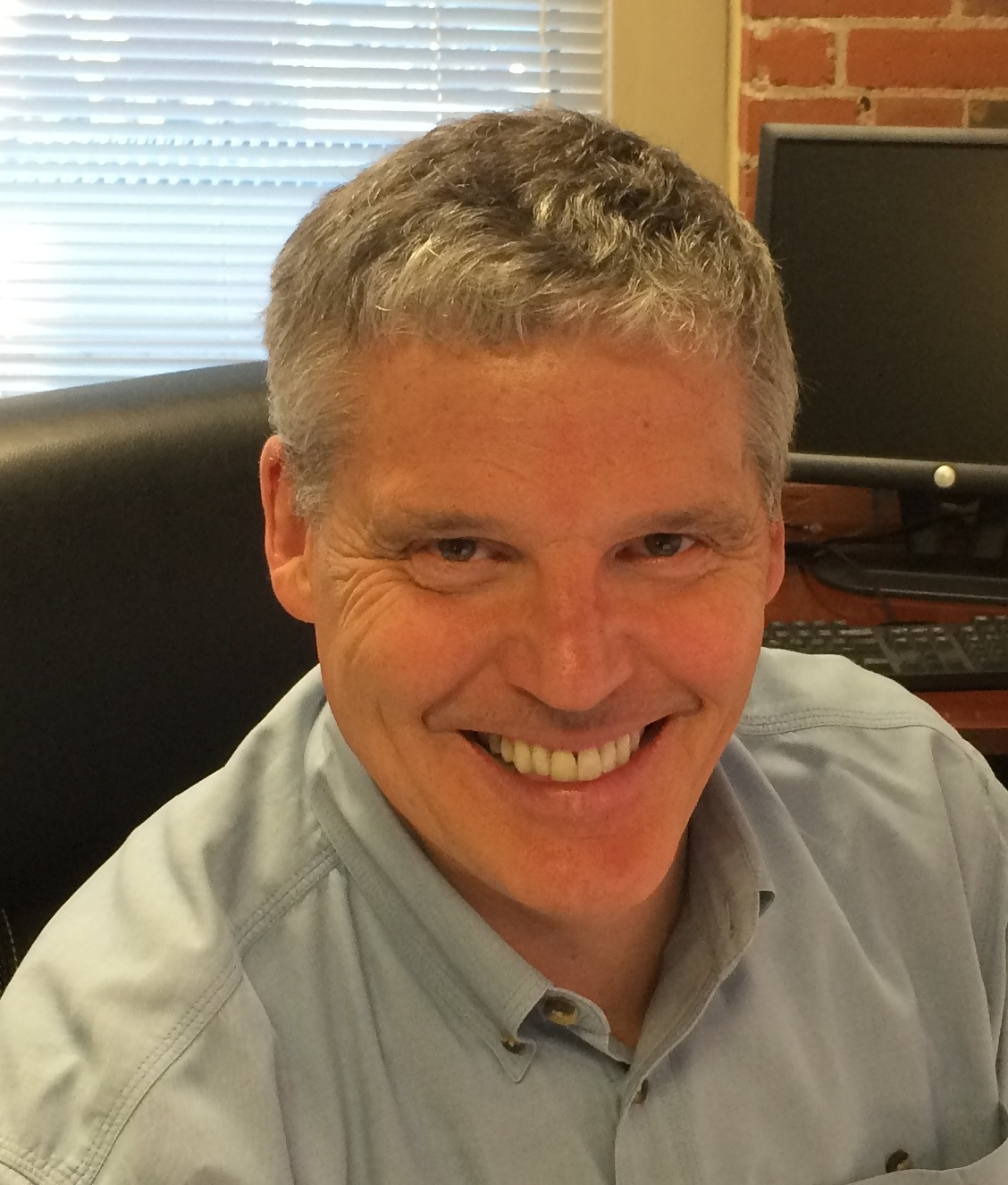
- Murray in 2014
- Born: Frank Hardart Murray; 1953 (age 72–73); New York City, U.S.
- Education: Ohio Wesleyan University (BA); Harvard Business School (MBA)
- Occupation: Business executive
- Spouse: Sachi Parker (m. 1993; div. 2011)
- Children: 2
- Relatives: William J. Murray (paternal grandfather); Frank Hardart (maternal grandfather); Samuel J. Murray (paternal great-grandfather); John F. Ahearn (maternal great-grandfather)

Frank Hardart Murray (born 1953) is an American business executive. He is founder, president and chief executive officer of InterTech Media. In the 1990s, Murray was the chairman and CEO of Goodman Manufacturing Company and engineered Goodman's purchase of Amana Corporation from Raytheon and initiated Amana's successful brand-revitalization campaign.

== Early life ==
Born in New York City and raised in Connecticut, He is named after his maternal great grandfather, Frank Hardart, co-founder of Horn & Hardart, the company known for Automats. On his father's side, he is the grandson of William J. Murray and the great-grandson of Samuel J. Murray, who manufactured playing cards at the United States Playing Card Company. On his grandmother's side he is the great-grandson of John F. Ahearn who was a Tammany Hall leader and served as Manhattan Borough President from 1903–1909. His father, Samuel J. Murray, was a veteran of World War II.

Murray received a bachelor's degree in mathematics and economics from Ohio Wesleyan University and an MBA from Harvard Business School.

== Career ==
Early in his career, Murray was a partner in the Beacon Group, a managing director of Mergers & Acquisitions at Merrill Lynch and a vice president at Dillon Read. At Dillon Read, he was a member in the defense team for Unocal Corporation which prevented a takeover-attempt by T. Boone Pickens' Mesa Petroleum in 1985. The case resulted in the Delaware Supreme Court decision Unocal v. Mesa Petroleum.

He first came into contact with Goodman Manufacturing, a heating and air conditioning company, as a financial adviser to Goodman's founder, Harold Goodman. When Harold Goodman died in January 1995, the Goodman family asked Murray to take his place as chairman and CEO at the company's headquarters in Houston, Texas, the following year.

At the time, Goodman was the number four heating and air conditioning company behind Carrier Corporation, and reaching market saturation. Murray saw Amana as "an opportunity to expand into new product lines with a well-known brand." The sale of Amana to Goodman was announced July 14, 1997. The deal included Amana's home appliance, commercial cooking and heating and air conditioning business, but not Raytheon's commercial laundry business. Amana was headquartered in Amana, Iowa, and had 5,500 employees.

Murray initiated a $20 million brand revitalization campaign for the long dormant Amana brand, by DDB Worldwide's New York branch. The ads, with the tag, "Built Better Than It Has To Be," featured female comedians, including Mad TV's Debra Wilson, on a bright pastel-colored background, talking about mishaps with refrigerators, ranges and washers and dryers and how Amana features can solve them. Under Murray, Goodman moved up Forbes' list of 500 Biggest Private Companies from #405 to 66.

Murray left Goodman in 1999 to return to Connecticut and in 2000, launched InterTech Media.

== "Laws of Base Ball" Documents ==
In 1999, Murray purchased the 1857 'Laws of Base Ball' documents authored by Daniel Lucius 'Doc' Adams, at a Sotheby's auction and identified Doc Adams as the founder of the modern rules of baseball. The documents established key foundational rules of modern baseball like the 90-foot distance between bases and nine-inning games. The documents and Murray’s analysis, in effect change the history of baseball. The documents changed the rules of the game in 1857 from the original rules written by Alexander Cartwright in 1845. Cartwright’s rules did not specify the 90-foot base paths, nine innings per game or nine players per side. Attribution of these rules was erroneously attributed to Cartwright in 1939 when the Baseball Hall of Fame named him the “Father of Modern Baseball”. The Hall now recognizes the early error and is displaying the documents at the Hall. Cartwright left the New York Knickerbockers in 1849 and moved to Hawaii and had nothing to do with the modern rules of baseball.

== Personal life ==
In 1993, Murray married Sachi Parker, daughter of Shirley MacLaine and Steve Parker. They lived for a while in Houston, Texas, while Murray was the chairman and CEO of Goodman Holdings and Amana Appliances. The couple divorced in 2011. The couple have two children.
