= The Automat =

2021 American documentary by Lisa Hurwitz

- Theatrical release poster featuring Mel Brooks
- Directed by: Lisa Hurwitz
- Written by: Michael Levine
- Produced by: Lisa Hurwitz
- Starring: Mel Brooks; Ruth Bader Ginsburg; Elliott Gould; Colin Powell; Carl Reiner; Howard Schultz
- Cinematography: Philip Lucas
- Edited by: Michael Levine; Russell Greene
- Music by: Hummie Mann
- Distributed by: A Slice of Pie Productions
- Release dates: September 2, 2021 (Telluride); February 18, 2022 (United States)
- Running time: 79 minutes
- Country: United States
- Language: English
- Box office: $257,221

The Automat is a 2021 American documentary directed and produced by Lisa Hurwitz and written by Michael Levine. It is about the automats once operated by Horn & Hardart. It features an original song by Mel Brooks. The film premiered at the Telluride Film Festival on September 2, 2021. It was released in the United States on February 18, 2022, by A Slice of Pie Productions. The film received generally positive reviews from critics.

== Synopsis ==
Horn & Hardart, founded in 1888 by Joseph Horn and Frank Hardart, was noted for operating the first food service automats in Philadelphia and New York City. The restaurant chain was well known in the U.S. for serving food out of a vending machine for a nickel. The last New York Horn & Hardart Automat closed in April 1991.

== Appearances ==
- Mel Brooks
- Ruth Bader Ginsburg
- Elliott Gould
- Colin Powell
- Carl Reiner
- Howard Schultz

== Production ==
The documentary details the rise and fall of the Horn & Hardart automats. Director Lisa Hurwitz was inspired to create the documentary because she loved eating in her school cafeteria day after day during her college days. The film features an original song titled "At the Automat" written and performed by Mel Brooks.

== Release ==
The film premiered at the Telluride Film Festival on September 2, 2021. It was released in the United States on February 18, 2022, by A Slice of Pie Productions.

== Reception ==
=== Box office ===
In the United States, the film earned $13,917 from the Film Forum theater in its opening weekend and went on to earn $257,221 overall.

=== Reception ===
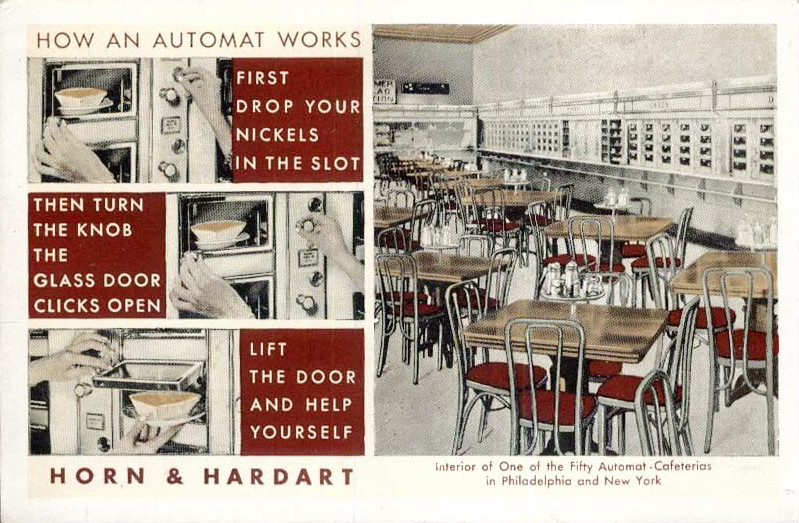
The critical consensus on Rotten Tomatoes said The Automat would make viewers nostalgic.

On the review aggregator website Rotten Tomatoes, 98% of 51 critics' reviews are positive, with an average rating of 8/10. The website's consensus reads: "A wistful ode to a bygone era, The Automat will make viewers nostalgic for America's past – and hungry for a meal at the titular diner." Metacritic, which uses a weighted average, assigned the film a score of 79 out of 100, based on 9 critics, indicating "generally favorable" reviews.

The Hollywood Reporter's Stephen Farber wrote, "Hurwitz supplements the talking heads with tasty archival footage and sharp graphics. Her film is sleek and unpretentious. It wins us over with humor and a pointed touch of melancholy." Variety's Owen Gleiberman said the film "taps into so many resonant aspects of what America used to be that to watch it is to be drawn into an enchanting and wistfully profound time-tripping reverie." Writing for The New York Observer, Rex Reed said it "gets to the core of the Automat's significance, cutting to the core of its social impact on New York and the changing world we live in." The New Yorker's Richard Brody said the best part of the film was "its blend of social and intellectual history with its anecdotal history—its evocation of the links between intention, practice, and experience; its depiction of a largely lost aesthetic of daily life."
