= Acson Malaysia =

Malaysian air conditioner brand

Acson
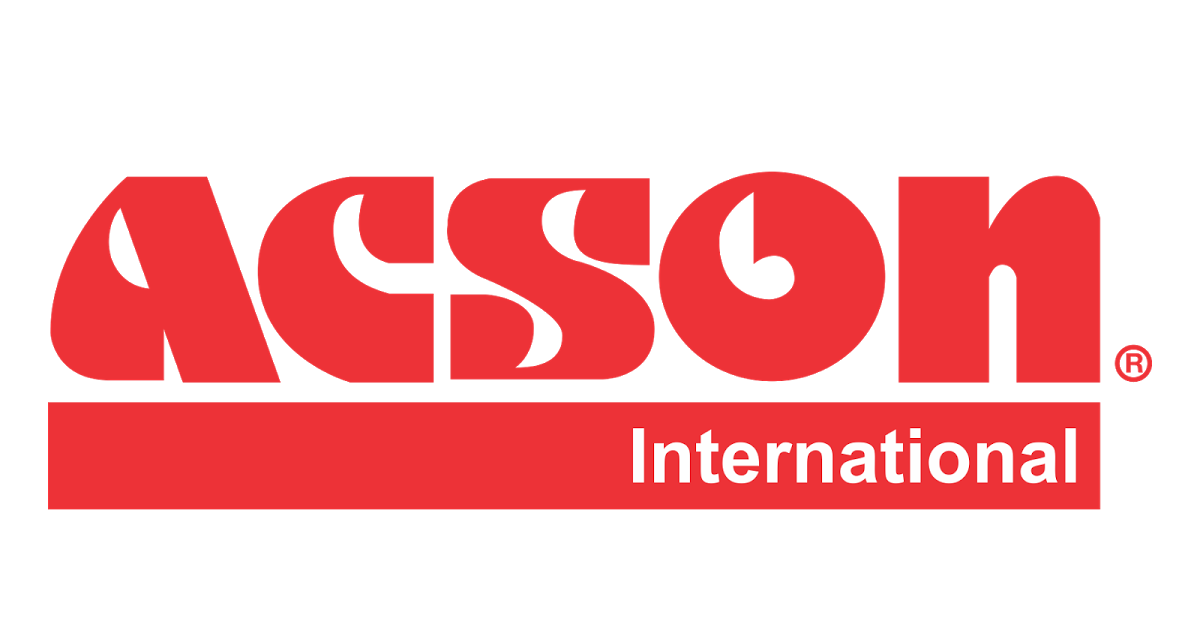
- Industry: Air conditioner
- Founded: 1984; 41 years ago
- Headquarters: Malaysia
- Area served: Worldwide
- Parent: Daikin
- Website: www.acson.com.my

Acson Malaysia Sales & Service Sdn Bhd is a Malaysian air conditioner brand and a subsidiary of Daikin.

== History ==
It was founded in 1984 and was known as O.Y.L. Manufacturing Company Sdn. Bhd, being the first Malaysian air conditioner brand.

The company was acquired by Daikin in 2006.
