= Germersheim =

- Town
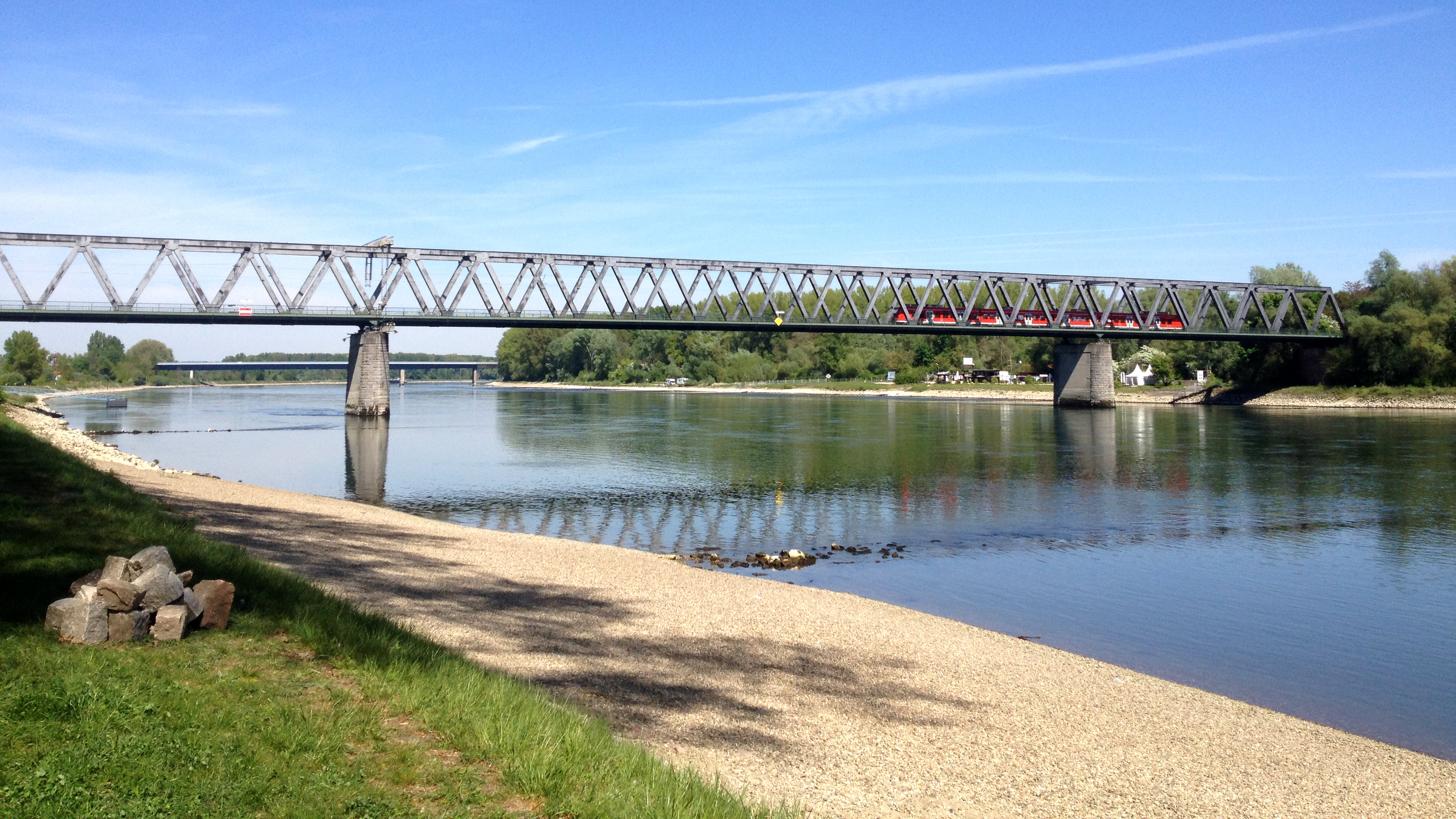
- Railway bridge over the Rhine River

- Flag Coat of arms

- Location of Germersheim within Germersheim district
- Interactive map of Germersheim
- Location within Germany Location within Rhineland-Palatinate
- Coordinates: 49°13′00″N 8°22′00″E
- Country: Germany
- State: Rhineland-Palatinate
- District: Germersheim

Government
  - Mayor (2017–25): Marcus Schaile (CDU)

Area
  - Total: 21.68 km^{2} (8.37 sq mi)
- Elevation: 105 m (344 ft)

Population (2025-12-31)
  - Total: 21,532
  - Density: 993.2/km^{2} (2,572/sq mi)
- Time zone: UTC+01:00 (CET)
  - Summer (DST): UTC+02:00 (CEST)
- Postal codes: 76726
- Dialling codes: 07274
- Vehicle registration: GER
- Website: www.germersheim.de

Germersheim (German: [ˈɡɛʁmɐshaɪm]) is a town in the German state of Rhineland-Palatinate, of around 20,000 inhabitants. It is also the seat of the Germersheim district. The neighboring towns and cities are Speyer, Landau, Philippsburg, Karlsruhe and Wörth.

== Coat of arms ==
The coat of arms features a golden crowned eagle on a blue background. The eagle derives from the fact that, at one time the town was ruled directly by the emperor of Germany.

== History ==
After his invasion of Gallia, Gaius Iulius Caesar made the Rhine river the border between the Roman Empire and Germania. Some small areas east of it were later invaded and added to the Roman province of Agri Decumates. As it was attacked more and more it was given up in the second half of the third century and a military camp was founded, named "Vicus Iulii" ("Village of Julius/Julius' Village). It was supported up to the fourth century.

The first record of the name "Germersheim" is from 1090, when it was named in the Sinsheimer Chronik (Chronicle of Sinsheim). The citadel was rebuilt by the emperor Conrad II, and the German king Rudolph von Habsburg (Rudolf of Habsburg) gave Germersheim city rights in 1276 (18 August). There is a legend which says that he, as a sick man, rode from Germersheim to Speyer to die there and not in Germersheim.

In 1325 the town was given to the Electorate of the Palatinate by King Ludwig IV. It got a higher status in the following centuries. A Catholic Order founded a monastery in 1298 which it used up to 1527. Having been nearly destroyed in the times of the plague and the Thirty Years' War, during which it was conquered by Austria and then by France, Germersheim was burned down by French troops in 1674. Only the crypt and the foundations of the Catholic Church survived.

The death of the childless elector Charles II in 1685 led to the devastating War of the Palatinate Succession (1688-1697) during which Germersheim was claimed by the French as a dependency of Alsace. Through the intervention of the pope in 1702, the French, on payment of a large sum, agreed to vacate the town, and in 1715 its fortifications were rebuilt.

Still strategically important during the French Revolutionary Wars, in July 1793 Germersheim was the scene of a significant French defeat when an Austrian army under the veteran Field Marshal von Wurmser defeated a French army under Beauharnais.

From the year 1797, Germersheim belonged to France, incorporated into the newly created Mont-Tonnerre department in 1798. It was conquered by Bavarian troops in 1814. After being retaken in 1814, Germersheim's Bavarian rulers started to build a fortress in 1831. It was completed in 1855, although excavations for underground passages continued until 1861. By this time, however, the fortress had become outdated, as artillery had improved greatly in the thirty years since work began. The fortress was destroyed in 1921/22 as a result of the Treaty of Versailles. Some parts still exist, such as the "Fronte Beckers", where the town's Music School is today.

Germersheim was the scene of several conflicts between French troops and German veteran associations during the occupation of the Rhineland following the First World War.

General Hans Graf von Sponeck, who ordered the retreat of his troops from Kerch because they were going to be hopelessly cut off by the Russian landings at Theodosia on the Crimean peninsula, and against express instruction of his superior officer in the winter 1941, was interned here in the fortress after Hitler had commuted his death sentence to six years' detention. In the purge following the failed assassination attempt on Hitler Graf von Sponeck, although not involved, was shot. Today, a street in Germersheim is named Hans-Graf-von-Sponeck-Straße in his honour.

== Transport ==
There are regular regional train connections to Karlsruhe and Mannheim.

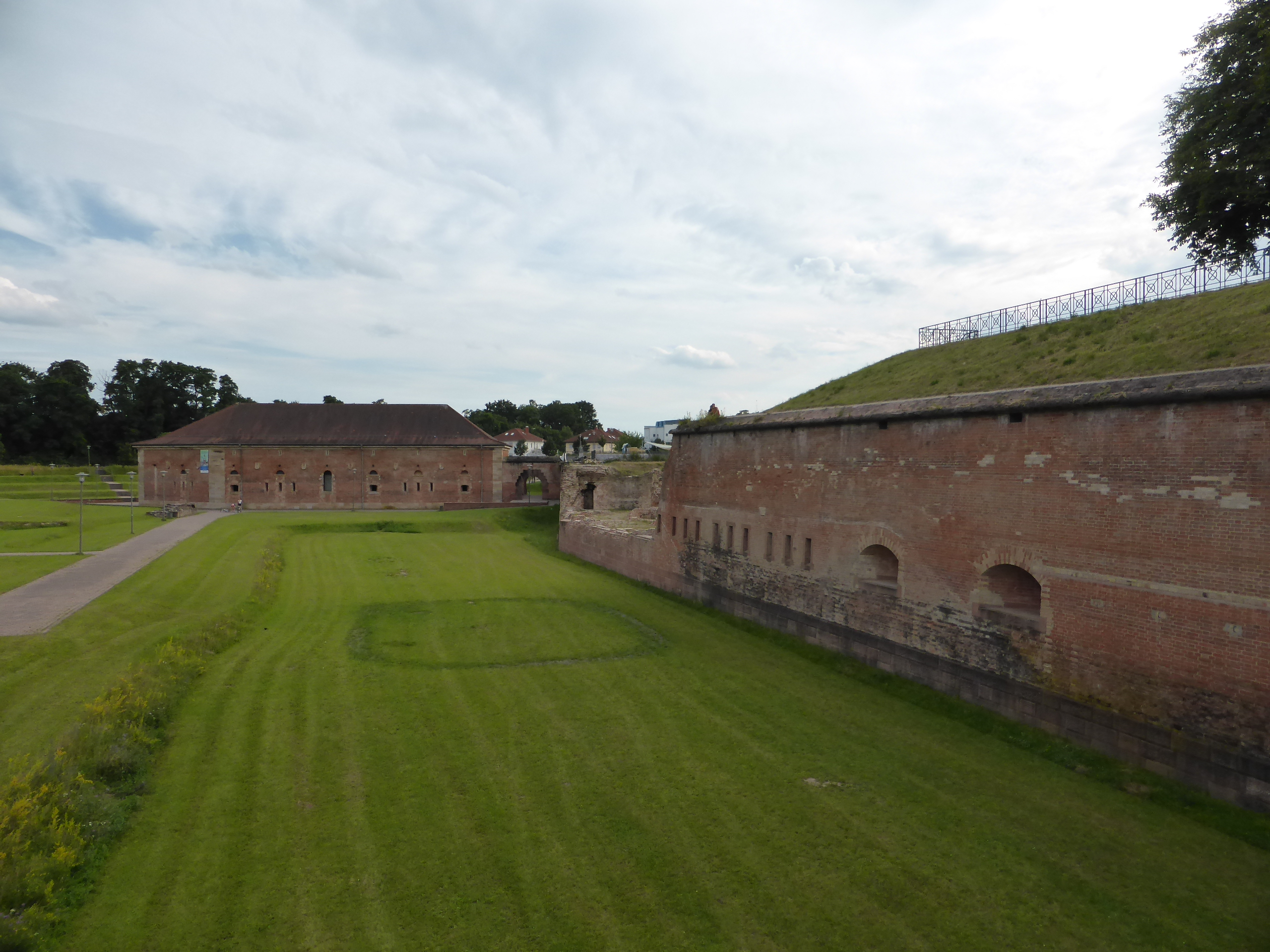
Germersheim-Weissenburger Tor (Tor=gate)

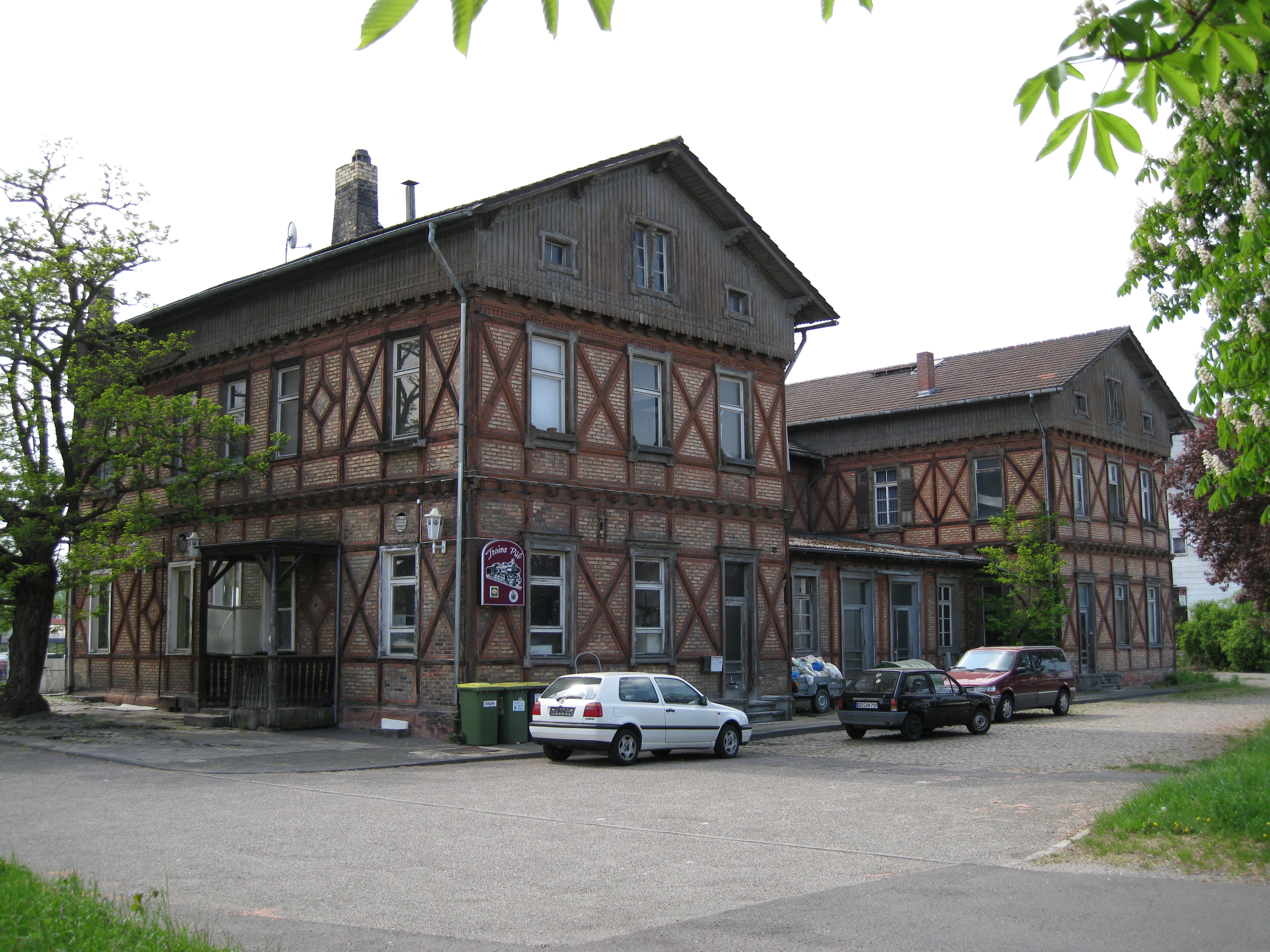
Old train station

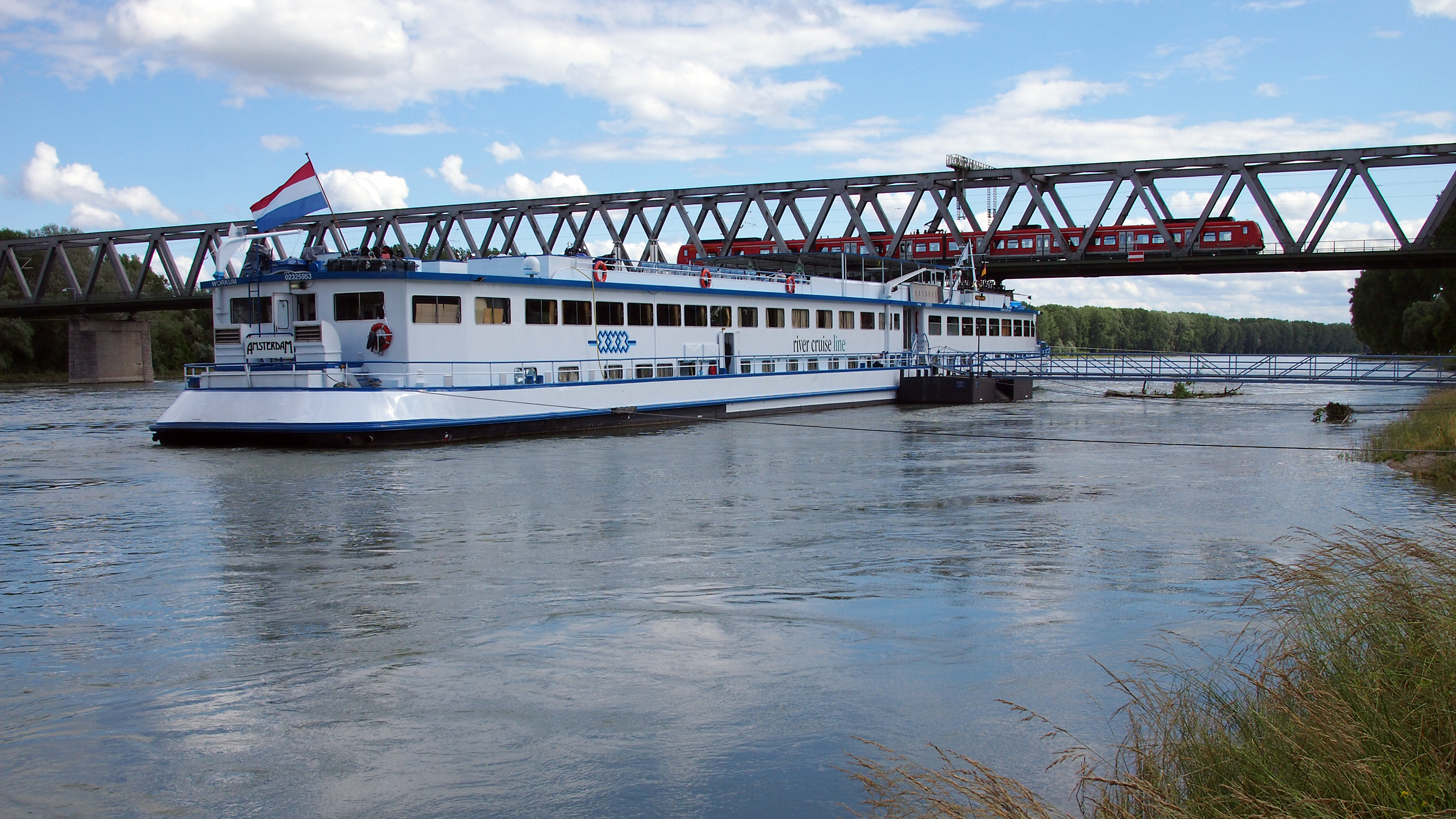
Bridge over the Rhine

== Local council ==
Seat distribution in the town council (2014)
Party	Percentage	Number of seats
CDU	40.8	15
SPD	20.3	7
FWG	19.7	7
REP	5.6	2
FDP	3.1	1
B90/Grüne	10.6	4

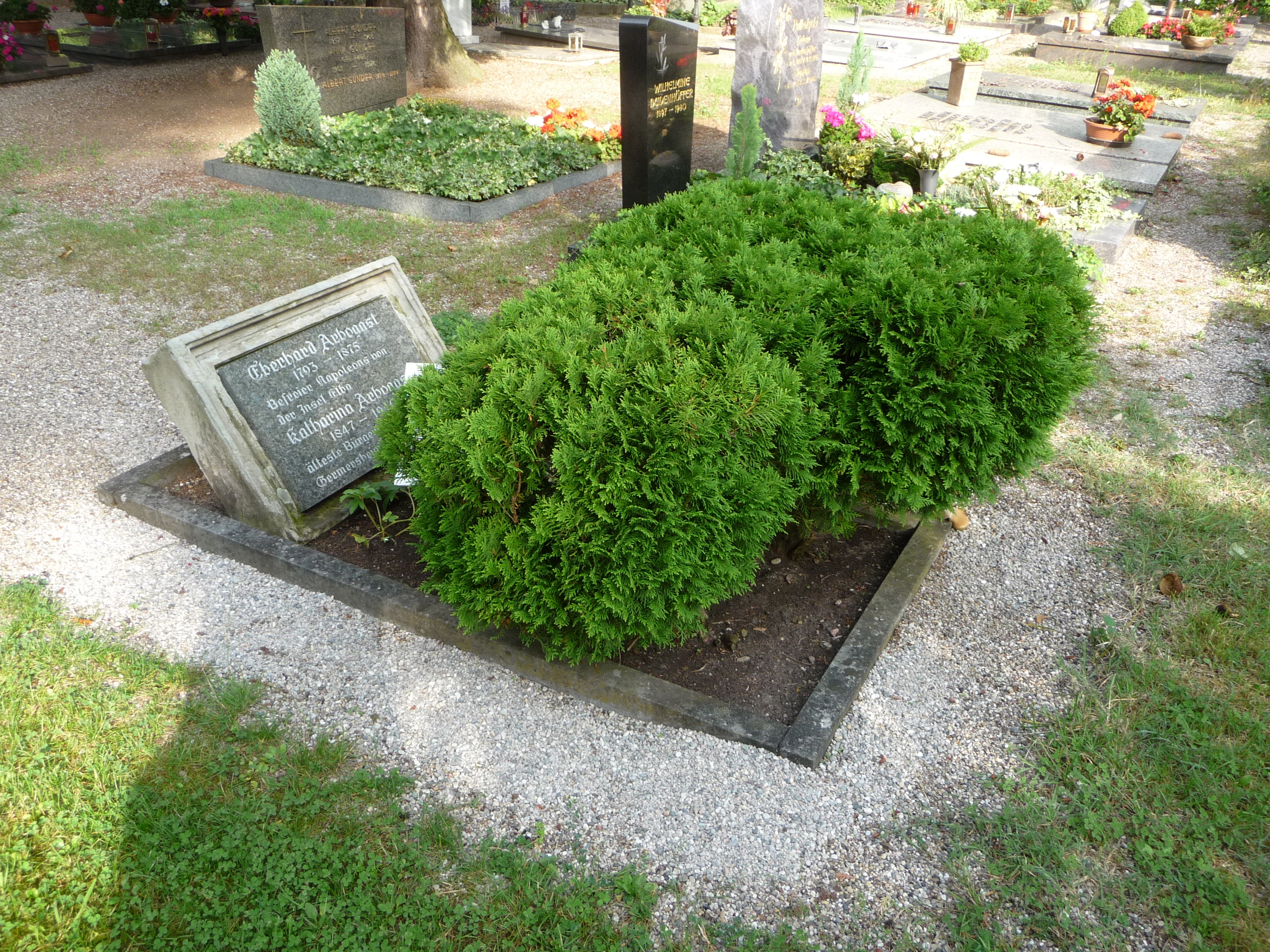
Gravestone of Eberhard Arbogast and his wife Katharina

== Notable people ==
- Paul Josef Nardini (1821–1862), theologian
- Eugen von Zimmerer (1843–1918), governor of Cameroon and minister
- Frank Hardart, born as Franz Anton Hardardt (1850–1918), American entrepreneur, co-founder of the Horn & Hardart food services company
- Otto Freiherr Kreß von Kressenstein (1850–1929), Bavarian general and War Minister
- Friedrich Kreß von Kressenstein (1855–1920), Bavarian General of the Infantry
- Hermann Kriebel (1876–1941), officer, Freikorpsführer, diplomat, and NSDAP politician
- Friedrich Krebs (1894–1961), lawyer and politician (NSDAP)
- Franz Sondinger (1896–1939), director, actor, director, and writer
- Karl Schmitt-Walter (1900–1985), opera singer
- Franz Immig (1918–1955), soccer player
- Lothar Fischer (1933–2004), sculptor
- Jule Brand (born 2002), footballer for the Germany national team and OL Lyonnes

=== Honorary Citizens ===
- Karl Schmitt-Walter (1900–1985), opera singer
- Eduard Orth (1902–1968), politician (CDU), Education minister of the state of Rhineland-Palatinate from 1956 to 1967
