= International Male =

1970s and 80s brand for mail ordering

International Male was a mail-order clothing brand and, at one point in the brand's history, carried brick-and-mortar stores of the same name. International Male was a vendor of men's casual, office-casual, and some gallant clothing items. The company that created the brand, originally Brawn of California, founded in 1974–1975, has since been sold in its entirety in 1987 to Hanover Direct, based in New Jersey, when founder Gene Burkard retired. Burkard died on December 11, 2020.

The catalog originally carried a wide variety of men's underwear, but this was once spun off into a separate catalog, called Undergear, which focused exclusively on men's underwear, swimwear, and some casual wear. The last mailed catalog of International Male was published in 2007. The brands are both available via their own websites, but the International Male site is now defunct and redirects to the Undergear site.

As of 2009, Hanover Direct consolidated these two product platforms under the Undergear label. Undergear is now the sole catalog and web site and incorporates the non-underwear items that would earlier have been in the International Male catalog and website. The selection of non-underwear clothing is quite limited in comparison to the former years (when International Male was its own separate catalog and website featuring a wide range of clothing beyond just underwear and swimwear). Over the years, many famous models and actors have posed for the catalog, such as Shemar Moore, Cameron Mathison, Charles Dera, Christian Boeving, David Chokachi, Gregg Avedon, Reichen Lehmkuhl, Rusty Joiner, Brandon Marcel and Scott King.

At one point, Brawn of California partnered with World Financial Network Bank (WFNNB) to offer their customers a credit card. The card is no longer available.

In 2022, a documentary on the history of the catalog, ALL MAN: The International Story, premiered at the Tribeca Festival.
