= Sachi Parker =

American actress

- Born: 1956 (age 69–70)
- Occupation: Actress
- Years active: 1984–2010
- Spouse: Frank H. Murray (m. 1993; div. 2011)
- Children: 2
- Mother: Shirley MacLaine
- Relatives: Warren Beatty (maternal uncle); Ella Beatty (cousin)

Sachi Parker (born Stephanie Sachiko Parker) is an American actress who has film and television credits.

== Early life ==
Parker is the daughter of actress Shirley MacLaine and businessman Steve Parker (1922–2001). MacLaine and her husband had an open marriage. At age two, Parker was sent to Japan to live with her father and his mistress. During the summer and at holidays, she visited her mother. They posed together on the cover of the February 9, 1959, issue of Life. Parker said her parents were negligent and her father was verbally abusive, calling her "the idiot" and forbidding her to read. Parker was frequently left home alone while her father went out. As a teen, she was sent to boarding school in Europe. Parker recalled that one Christmas neither of her parents showed up to pick her up from boarding school when she was 14, stranding her in Europe for weeks. Parker intended to go to college but claims she was cut off financially from her parents at 17.

Her maternal uncle is actor Warren Beatty.

== Career ==
Parker taught skiing in New Zealand, worked as a waitress in Hawaii, joined Qantas on 24 April 1979 and spent five years working as a flight attendant for Qantas Airways, and worked for a brief time as an au pair in Paris, France. In 1981, she returned to Los Angeles, and decided to become an actress. Parker claimed her mother did little to help and sabotaged her career.

Parker's work includes television appearances on Star Trek: The Next Generation, Equal Justice, and Alien Nation, and small film roles in Stick, About Last Night..., Peggy Sue Got Married and Bad Influence. Parker has also done small local theater. Parker starred in the 2009 Japanese film The Witch of the West Is Dead, which showed at the Palm Springs International Film Festival.

On February 7, 2013, the Penguin Group published Parker's autobiography, Lucky Me: My Life With – and Without – My Mom, Shirley MacLaine. Parker opened up about her unconventional childhood and her estranged relationship with her mother. Parker was a lonely child and she still struggles with "abandonment issues and loneliness". Parker said writing the book was therapeutic and though she struggled with guilt, she "decided to stop protecting her". She sent her mother a copy of the book with a note saying, "I love you." MacLaine called the book "virtually all fiction," and added "I'm sorry to see such a dishonest, opportunistic effort from my daughter for whom I've only ever wanted the best."

== Personal life ==
Parker was married to investment banker Frank Murray from 1993 to 2011, and they lived for a time in Houston, Texas, while Murray was the chairman and CEO of Goodman Holdings and the Amana Corporation. Parker and Murray have two children.

== Filmography ==
- Stick (1985) – Bobbi
- Back to the Future (1985) – Bystander #1
- About Last Night... (1986) – Carrie
- Peggy Sue Got Married (1986) – Lisa
- Riders to the Sea (1987)
- Scrooged (1988) – Belle
- Vietnam Texas (1990) – Young Woman
- Bad Influence (1990) – Michael's Neighbor
- Welcome Home, Roxy Carmichael (1990) – Libby Ohiemacher
- Nishi no majo ga shinda (2008) – Granny
- All Me, All the Time (2009) – Pam
- Toiretto (2010) – final film role
- "The So-So You Don't Know" – 4 episodes (2017-2018)

== Bibliography ==
- Lucky Me: My Life With – and Without – My Mom, Shirley MacLaine (Penguin Group USA, published February 2013) ISBN 9781592407880
