= Daikin Texas Technology Park =

Factory and office complex in Waller, Texas, US

- Location within Texas Location within the United States
- Built: 2017
- Location: NW Harris County near City of Waller, Texas, U.S.
- Coordinates: 30.048815°N 95.861091°W
- Industry: Heating and air conditioning
- Area: 4.23 million square feet (393,000 square meters)
- Owners: Daikin Industries, Ltd.

The Daikin Goodman Texas Technology Park (initially called the Comfortplex) is a major factory and office building in Waller, Texas, United States near Houston. Opened in 2017 as the manufacturing, logistics, and engineering center for Daikin's American subsidiary Goodman, the plant makes heating and air conditioning products sold under the Goodman, Amana, and Daikin brands (Daikin, Sekai).

With a footprint of 4.23 million square feet (393,000 square meters) under a single roof, the DTTP is the third largest factory in the United States (behind the Tesla Factory and the Boeing Everett Factory) and the fifth largest in the world.
