= Felix Dhünen =

German poet (1896–1939)

Olympic medal record

Art competitions
| Gold medal – first place | 1936 Berlin | Lyric works |

Felix Dhünen (real name Franz Sondinger; 5 January 1896 – 8 December 1939) was a German poet. He was born in Germersheim and died in Berlin. In 1936 he won a gold medal in the art competitions of the Olympic Games for his "Der Läufer" ("The Runner").
