= Goodman Global =

HVAC equipment manufacturer

Goodman Manufacturing
- Type: Subsidiary
- Industry: HVAC
- Founded: 1975; 51 years ago San Antonio, Texas, U.S.
- Founder: Harold V. Goodman
- Headquarters: Waller, Texas, U.S.
- Area served: United States, Canada
- Key people: Takeshi Ebisu (CEO)
- Brands: Amana; GMC; Goodman; Janitrol
- Revenue: ▲$2.6 billion (2013)
- Number of employees: 5,000+
- Parent: Daikin
- Website: www.goodmanmfg.com

Goodman Manufacturing is an American company operating as an independent subsidiary of Daikin Group, the world's largest manufacturer of heating, ventilation and air conditioning products and systems.

Goodman is located in the $417 million Daikin Texas Technology Park.

== History ==
In 1982, the company acquired Janitrol and entered the HVAC market, expanding its product offering in 1986 to include gas heating products.

Harold V. Goodman died in 1996 and was succeeded by Frank H. Murray who became chairman and CEO in April 1996.

In 1997, Murray initiated and spearheaded the Goodman acquisition of Raytheon Appliances, the predecessor of Amana Corporation, a manufacturer of appliances and HVAC units. Four years later, in 2001, Goodman separated its appliances business from its HVAC business and sold it to Maytag Corporation.

In 2004, Goodman was acquired by Apollo Management, a private equity firm, for approximately $1.43 billion. Just a year and a half later, in April 2006, Goodman completed an initial public offering, listing on the New York Stock Exchange.

In October 2007, Goodman agreed to be acquired by Hellman & Friedman, a San Francisco-based private equity firm, in a $1.8 billion transaction. In August 2012, Hellman & Friedman agreed to sell Goodman Global to Japan's Daikin Industries Ltd. for $3.7 billion.

In 2015, Daikin commenced construction of the state-of-the-art Daikin Texas Technology Park campus near Houston, Texas. This project, costing over $400 million, was the largest investment made in Daikin's 90-year history. In October 2016, operations at the new facility ramped up and the first Goodman air conditioner and gas furnace units came off the line.

In 2017, the construction of the huge facility concluded to consolidate Goodman's HVAC manufacturing, engineering, logistics, and customer support under one, very large 4.1 million square foot roof.

In 2017, Goodman acquired property technology (proptech) company Motili, to expand its HVAC market reach.

Daikin Industries acquired Goodman in August 2012. Effective April 1, 2022, the company was renamed Daikin Comfort Technologies North America, Inc.

In 2021, Goodman announced a recall involving plastic drain pans under the evaporator coils, as the pans could overheat, melt, and deform when installed on a condensing gas furnace in an upflow configuration. There were 23 incidents reported causing fire and smoke damage, however, no injuries were reported. The recall was later expanded in 2024 to include evaporator coil drain pans installed with competitor brand non-condensing furnaces in an upflow configuration.

== Brands ==
- Amana Heating and Cooling
