= Daikin =

Japanese multinational conglomerate

Daikin Industries, Ltd.

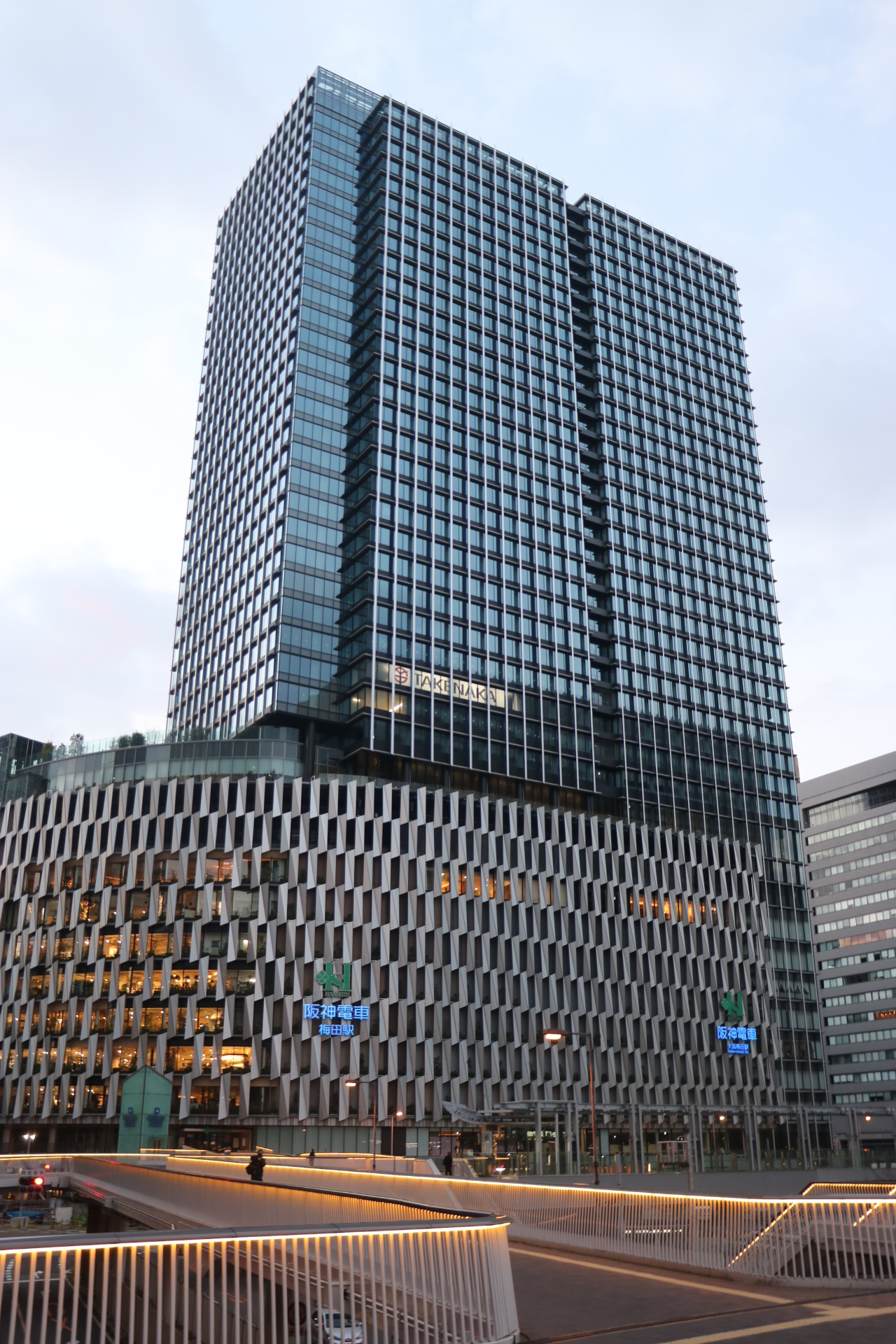
- Daikin headquarters at the Osaka Umeda Twin Towers South in Kita-ku, Osaka
- Type: Public
- Traded as: TYO: 6367; TOPIX Large 70 Component; Nikkei 225 Component
- Industry: Conglomerate
- Founded: 25 October 1924; 102 years ago
- Founder: Akira Yamada
- Headquarters: Osaka Umeda Twin Towers South, 1-13-1 Umeda, Kita-ku, Osaka 530-0001, Japan
- Key people: Masanori Togawa (CEO and president)
- Products: Home appliances Chemicals; Medical equipment Electronics; Oil hydraulics Defense systems
- Revenue: ▲¥4.75 trillion (2025) (US$30.02 billion)
- Operating income: ▲¥401.67 billion (2025) (US$2.54 billion)
- Net income: ▲¥264.76 billion (2025) (US$1.67 billion)
- Total assets: ▲¥5.13 trillion (2025) (US$32.43 billion)
- Total equity: ▲¥2.87 trillion (2025) (US$18.11 billion)
- Number of employees: 104,095 (FY2026)
- Website: daikin.com

Daikin Industries, Ltd. (ダイキン工業株式会社, Daikin Kōgyō Kabushiki-Gaisha) is a Japanese multinational conglomerate company headquartered in Osaka.

Its core products are HVAC (heating, ventilation, and air conditioning) equipment. As of 2022, the company ranked first by unit sales in the markets of Europe, Southeast Asia, India, Oceania, Taiwan, and Japan. As of 2023, overseas sales accounted for 84% of total revenue, and the company ranked first globally in terms of HVAC equipment sales. As of 2025, it operated production bases in more than 130 countries and conducted business in over 170 countries worldwide.

== History ==
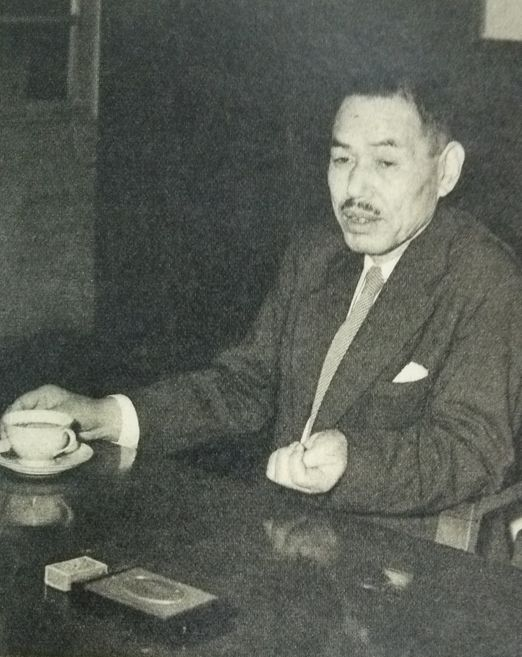
Akira Yamada, founder of Daikin Industries

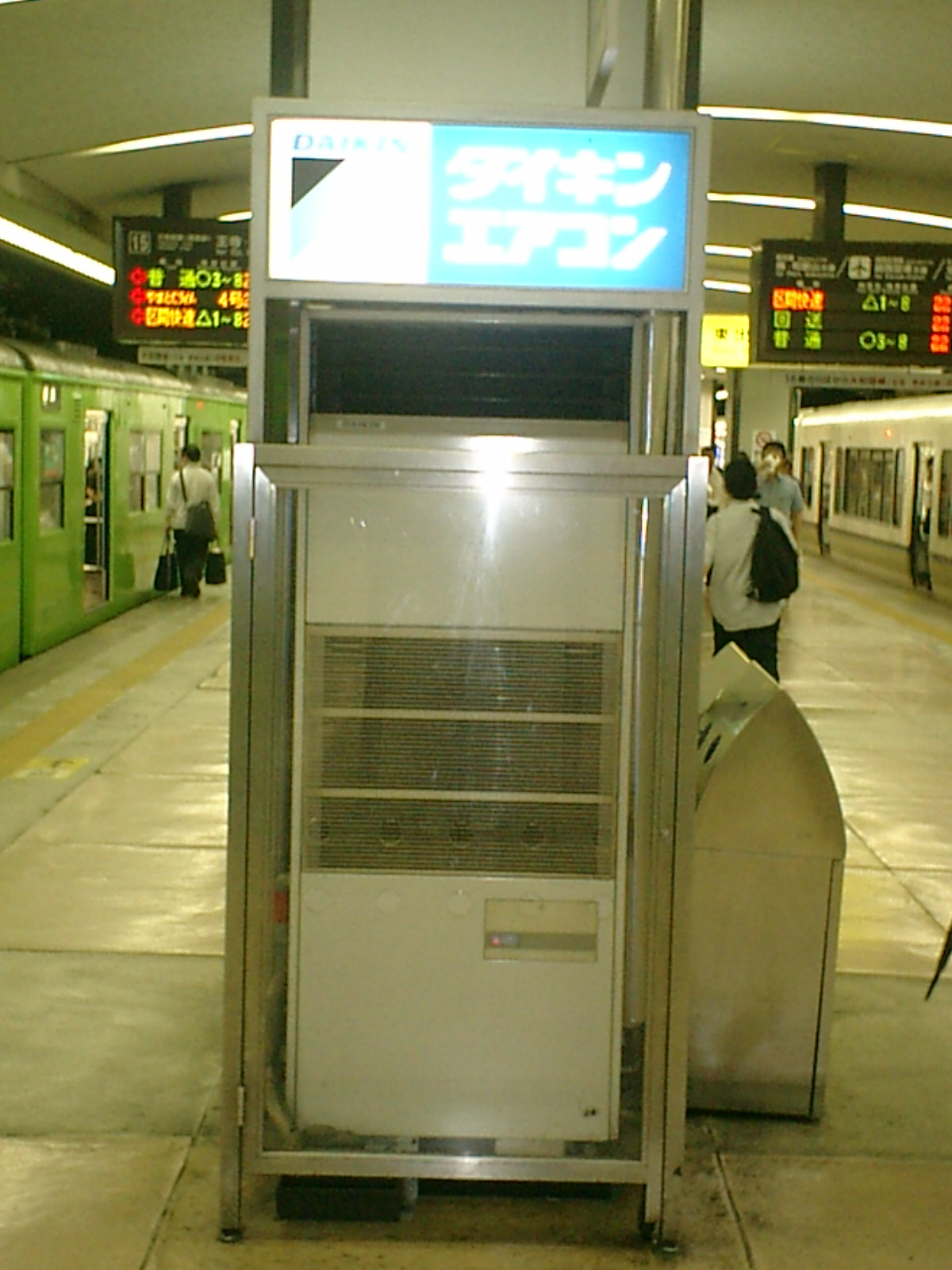
Daikin Air Conditioner at Tennōji Station

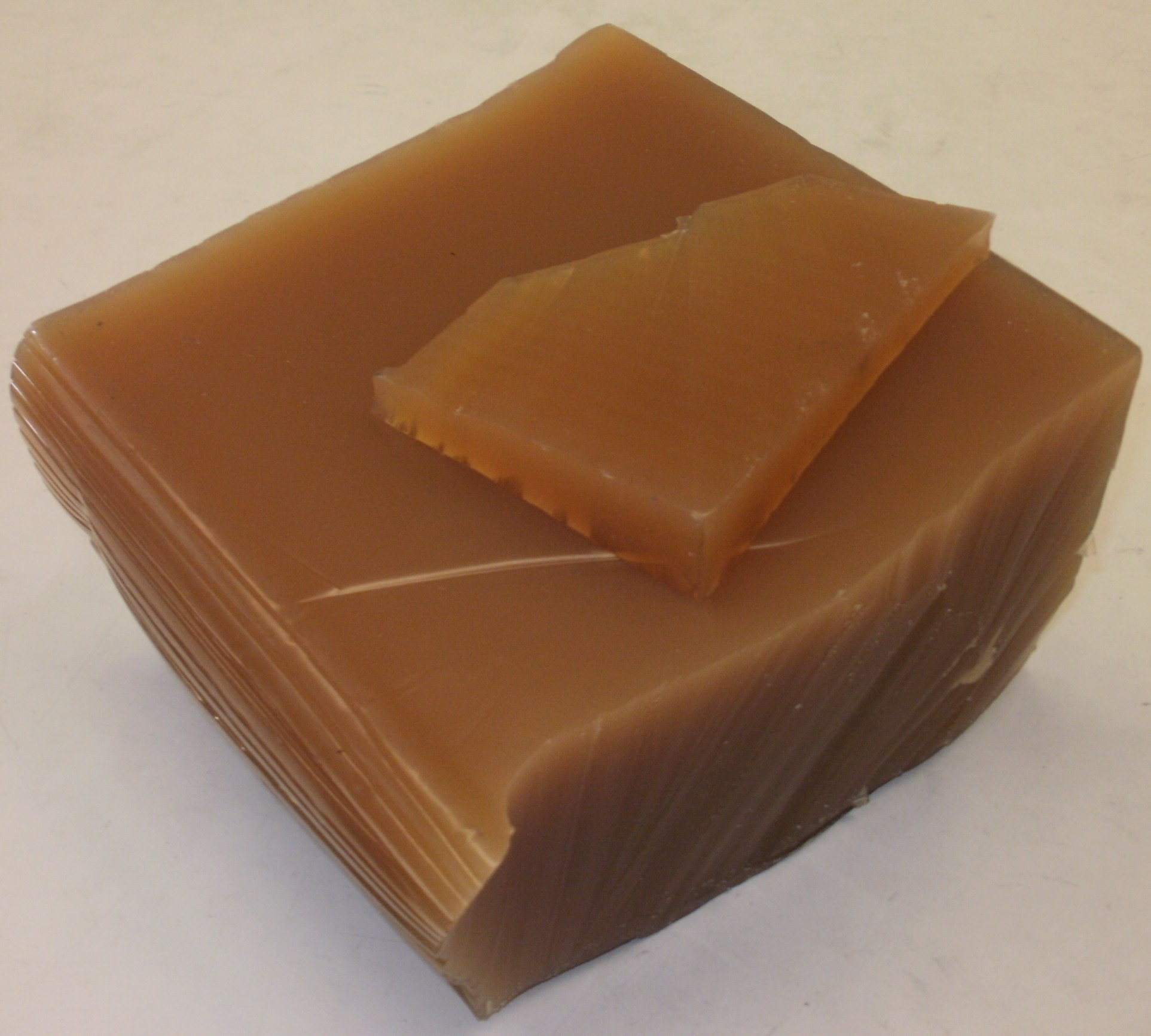
DAI-EL thermoplastic fluoroelastomer produced by Daikin

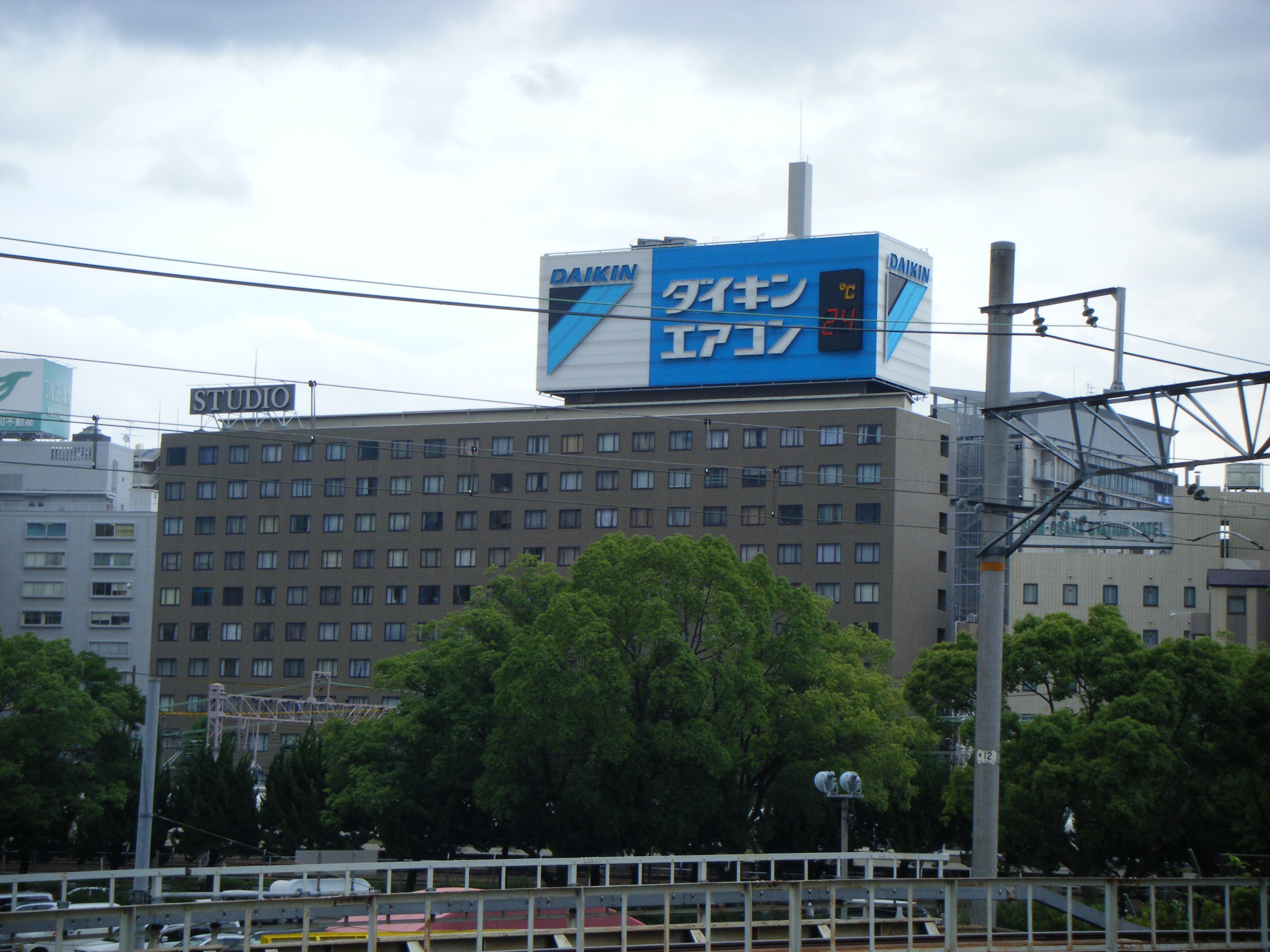
Neon sign of Daikin Industries near Shin-Ōsaka Station

Daikin Industries Ltd was founded in 1924 as Ōsaka Metalworking Industries LP (大阪金属工業所, Ōsaka Kinzoku Kōgyōsho) by Akira Yamada. In 1953, Daiflon or polychlorotrifluoroethylene was developed. In 1963 the company was renamed Daikin Industries, Ltd. (ダイキン工業株式会社, Daikin Kōgyō Kabushiki-Kaisha; Daikin deriving from the combined reading of the first kanji of 大阪 Ōsaka and the first of 金属 Kinzoku) and developed Neoflon. In 1982 it was renamed to the current Daikin Industries Ltd.

Daikin entered the North American air conditioning market in 2004.

In 2006, Daikin Industries acquired McQuay International, a Minneapolis, Minnesota–based global corporation that designs, manufacturers and sells commercial, industrial and institutional heating, ventilation and air conditioning (HVAC) products. In 2008, McQuay International was rebranded as Daikin-McQuay as Daikin began implementing many of its technologies (including the Daikin Inverter Compressor) and manufacturing processes into McQuay equipment and factories. However, in November 2013, the Daikin-McQuay group was again rebranded as Daikin Applied, ending 80 years of business for the McQuay name in the United States. Meanwhile, the McQuay brand continues to be used in mainland China and Hong Kong.

In the filtration realm, Daikin acquired American Air Filter (AAF) in 2007, and Flanders in 2016. The resulting entity is known both as AAF International and AAF Flanders.

In 2008, Daikin purchased a 75% share of All World Machinery Supply based in Roscoe, Illinois. In 2009, Daikin Airconditioning Philippines was established.

In August 2012 Daikin agreed to acquire Goodman Global from the San Francisco–based private equity firm Hellman & Friedman for $3.7 billion, after first planning to buy Goodman the previous year. In January 2011, Daikin had announced plans to buy Goodman Global at approximately US$4 billion valuation; however, the plans were delayed for a year by the 2011 Tōhoku earthquake and tsunami.

The acquisition was expected to expand Daikin's presence in the United States and in duct-type and split-system air-conditioners, and was expected to make Daikin the world's largest maker of heating, ventilation and air-conditioning systems.

Later in 2013, they launched a split air conditioner, the Ururu Sarara FTXZ-N.

As of April 2014, Daikin Hydraulics marketed a line of piston pumps, vane pumps, manual pumps, solenoid valves, and flow and control valves, claiming their pump technology to be 50–70 percent more energy efficient than conventional technology.

In 2017, Daikin opened the Daikin Texas Technology Park, its largest plant and the fifth largest factory in the world. Costing $417 million, this 4.1-million-square-foot facility in Waller, Texas, will consolidate Goodman's manufacturing operations.

As of 2021, other companies representing additional Daikin brands include Motili and Quietflex.

On 2 March 2023, Daikin announced they had acquired the San Diego–based custom air-handling equipment manufacturer Alliance Air Products.

In 2024, Daikin bought the naming rights to Minute Maid Park, home of Major League Baseball's Houston Astros, renaming it to Daikin Park on 1 January 2025. The deal is expected to run through 2039.

On 27 February 2025, Daikin announced that the company will stop producing white phosphorus shells.

In April 2026, Elliott Investment Management said it would work with Daikin to improve performance and narrow its valuation gap with peers. This led Daikin's shares to jump by as much as 13.9%.

=== Centennial celebration ===
On 28 April 2024, Daikin Philippines President Takayoshi Miki hosted Daikin's first fun run, "Daikin: Run for Clean Air 2024" at Bridgetowne with 800 runners. On 21 May 2024, Daikin Industries, led by President & CEO, Masanori Togawa with Chief global group officer and board chair, Noriyuk Inhoue, celebrated its centennial founding with a commemorative ceremony attended by 2,000 at The Symphony Hall to further support its "Forests for the Air" project.

=== PFAS pollution and lawsuits ===
In 2005, Daikin and 3M paid $4 million in a US settlement over water contamination with perfluorinated compounds in Decatur, Alabama, the site of several chemical production facilities. In 2017 Daikin agreed to pay $5 million to the West Morgan-East Lawrence authority for an advanced water purification filter. The authority had advised residents not to drink the water in 2016 due to PFAS contamination. In 2021 Daikin, 3M, Toray, BFI Waste Systems, and Synagro paid a $98.5 million settlement with the city of Decatur over PFAS dumping in Morgan County.

A 2004 study by Kyoto University Professor Akio Koizumi identified Daikin as the source of PFOA pollution in the Yodo river. In 2020 a Settsu city survey in Osaka found elevated levels of PFAS contamination in groundwater and waterways. One well used to irrigate crops was found to have levels 420 times over the national average. In 2021 blood tests of 9 residents living near Daikin's Yodogawa factory revealed elevated levels of PFAS, the highest in a 69-year old man 70 times the national average. Daikin had suspended production of PFAS-based water repellents in 2012 and stated the risks were "only possibly carcinogenic, like how pickled vegetables are" and that the water in Daikin's wastewater treatment tanks as "clean enough to drink" at a city council meeting. Daikin later issued retractions towards the "clean enough to drink" statement. Production and export of perfluorinated compounds in Japan have been banned since 2021.

== Business divisions and products ==
Daikin is organised into the following divisions, offering the following products:

- Air conditioning
  - Residential air conditioners
  - Residential air purifiers
  - Commercial-use air conditioners
  - Commercial-use air purifiers
  - Humidity-adjusting external air-processing units
  - Large-sized chillers
  - Marine container refrigeration units
  - Marine vessel air conditioners
- Chemicals
  - Fluorocarbons
  - Fluoroplastics
  - Fluoro coatings
  - Fluoroelastomers
  - Fluorinated oils
  - Oil- and water-repellent products
  - Mold release agents
  - Pharmaceuticals and intermediates
  - Semiconductor-etching products
  - Dry air suppliers
- Air filtration
- Oil hydraulics
  - Industrial hydraulic equipment and systems
  - Mobile hydraulic equipment
  - Centralized lubrication equipment and systems
- Medical equipment
  - Rebreathers and similar equipment
  - Home-use oxygen therapy equipment
- Electronics business
  - System management of product development process
  - Facility design CAD software
  - Molecular chemistry software

== Daikin Industries, Ltd. ==
In August 2016, Daikin Industries Ltd opened a fully functional headquarters in Cairo, Egypt. Daikin Cairo is yet another move for the company to establish business in Africa. Plans are underway to open more headquarters.
