= Frank Hardart =

American businessman (1850 – 1918)

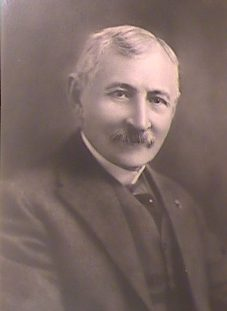
Frank Hardart in 1918

Frank Hardart Sr. (October 22, 1850 – December 10, 1918) was the co-founder with Joseph V. Horn of Horn & Hardart, the food service company that launched the Horn & Hardart Automat cafeterias in Philadelphia and New York. Patrons at the Automats could serve themselves by putting coins into a wall of glass-fronted dispensers, opening a door to an individual serving of everything from a hot entree or sandwich to a piece of pie.

== Biography ==
Frank Hardart Sr. was born as Franz Anton Hardardt in the Bavarian community of Sondernheim, today an urban district of Germersheim, in the Palatinate (at that time a part of the Kingdom of Bavaria) in 1850, the son of Jakob Franz Hardardt II and Franziska Katharina, née Mainzer. He emigrated to America in 1858 with his widowed mother, an older brother and two sisters, who settled in New Orleans, Louisiana. He started out washing dishes and cooking in restaurants. While working at a lunch counter at age 13, he learned the French-drip coffee brewing method – a departure from the boiled coffee common at time. The French-drip coffee was later credited as part of Horn & Hardart's early success.

In 1876, Hardart bought a one-way ticket to Philadelphia, with the idea of introducing New Orleans' French-drip coffee to a new market. The city had the Centennial Exhibition that year and its restaurants were flush with out of town visitors. Hardart took a job washing dishes but was unsuccessful in selling the idea of French-drip coffee to restaurants.

He returned to New Orleans and waited tables, saving what money he could. He met and married a young Irishwoman named Mary Bruen and in 1886, they moved to Philadelphia to continue Hardart's dream of introducing a new cup of coffee to the masses.

He was working at a luncheonette called Joe Smith's in 1888 when he answered an advertisement by Joseph V. Horn (1861–1941), who was looking for a restaurant partner. Horn, who came from a wealthy family in Philadelphia, had borrowed $1,000 from his mother to place the ads. "Horn got only one answer: three words, scribbled on a scrap of paper, stuffed in an envelope with a boarding house return address on it. Frank Hardart had sent it. He'd been working in a quick lunch (sandwich shop) called Joe Smith's when he saw Horn's ad. He tore off the corner of a bag of sugar, wrote, 'I'm your man' on it, and mailed it."

On December 22, 1888, Horn and Hardart opened their first restaurant together in Philadelphia and in 1898, they incorporated as the Horn & Hardart Baking Company. Horn & Hardart's success grew as they opened lunchrooms on busy street corners in commercial areas of Philadelphia.

Horn had been inspired by a visit to a new "waiterless restaurant" in Boston called, "Thompson's Spa." But it wasn't until Hardart traveled to Berlin in 1900 to find out more about the German version, called "automats," that their own business changed. Frank Hardart purchased the machinery for $30,000, a huge sum at the time, from a German company called Quisisana, so Horn & Hardart could set up their own Automat in Philadelphia. The equipment took a year to build.

Unfortunately, the ship carrying Horn & Hardart's new machine, collided with another ship and sank. The equipment was insured, but Horn & Hardart had to wait another year for a replacement. They opened their first Automat on Chestnut Street in Philadelphia on June 2, 1902.

In 1905, they opened a second Automat in Philadelphia, in 1907 a third and in 1912, a fourth.

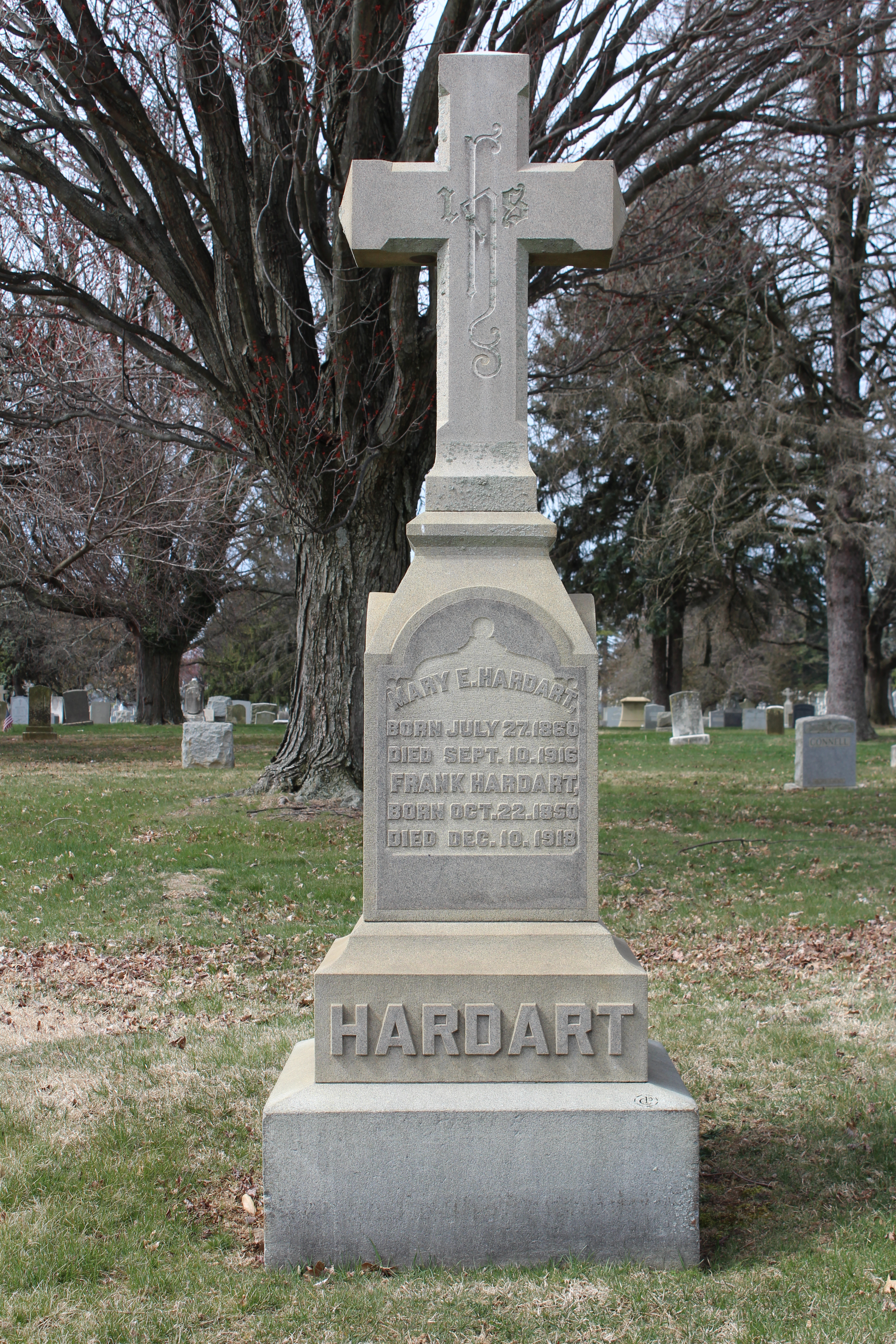
Hardart's tombstone at Holy Cross Cemetery in Yeadon, Pennsylvania

Frank Hardart Sr.'s son, Frank Hardart Jr.'s patented inventions helped perfect and expand the Automat. Frank Hardart Jr. rolled out Horn & Hardart's New York operations. He also took over for his father after Frank Hardart Sr. died in 1918.

== Family ==
Frank Hardart Sr. married Mary Bruen and they had six children: Florence Hardart; Frank J. Hardart Jr. (took over for his father at Horn & Hardart); Joseph Hardart; Nan Hardart; Erma Hardart; Augustin S. Hardart (Treasurer of Horn & Hardart)

Frank Hardart Jr. married Evelyn Roche. They had three children: Thomas R. Hardart, who followed his father into Horn & Hardart as the company's president and Chairman; Dr. Frank Hardart III, an OBGyn MD at St. Vincent's Hospital in New York; and Evelyn Murray of Greenwich, CT.

American business executive Frank H. Murray is the great-grandson of Frank Hardart Sr.

== Sources ==
- Diehl, Lorraine B.; Hardart, Marianne (November 19, 2002). The Automat: The History, Recipes, and Allure of Horn & Hardart's Masterpiece. New York: Clarkson_Potter. ISBN 978-0-609-61074-9. "oclc1298810185"
- "The Last Automat," by James T. Farrell (New York (magazine), May 14, 1979)
