= Samuel J. Murray =

Samuel John Murray
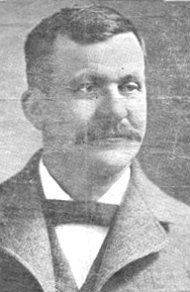
- Born: March 7, 1851; New York City, New York
- Died: August 23, 1915 (aged 64)
- Occupations: Vice president and treasurer, United States Playing Card Company

Samuel J. Murray (March 7, 1851 – August 23, 1915) was a New York printer's apprentice, inventor, and businessman. At the time of his death at age sixty-five, Murray was vice president and treasurer of the United States Playing Card Company, and a director of the W. B. Oglesby Paper Company of Middletown, Ohio. His block of stock in the United States Playing Card Company was said to be worth $1,000,000.

Called "a mechanical genius, the marvel and admiration of the technical and inventive world", Murray made his mark on the United States Playing Card Company by creating and installing manufacturing equipment, such as an automatic punch machine which "increased the output of cards fourfold" and reduced labor costs by sixty-six percent. With the automatic punch machine, great sheets of paper were fed into the machine and came out as complete packs of playing cards, printed in four colors.

== Early life ==
Murray was born in New York City on March 7, 1851. He grew up in Brooklyn and was childhood friends with Timothy Sullivan who introduced him to John F. Ahearn, whose daughter would eventually marry his son William. Murray's father died in the Draft riots when he was 12 years old. To help support his mother, two younger sisters, Catherine and Elizabeth, and younger brother, William, Murray found a job after school as a newsie delivering newspapers. He also worked as a waiter. His mother died when he was thirteen, leaving him to raise his younger siblings on his own.

He was hired as a printer's devil by Victor Eugene Mauger, where Murray learned from a worked sent to the US from the Goodall plant in London.

== Rising fortunes ==
After his attempt to start a small playing card plant in Montreal, Quebec, Canada was thwarted by a money panic, Murray was recruited in 1881 by Colonel Robert J. Morgan of the Russell & Morgan Company, to assist in the manufacture of playing cards at their plant in Cincinnati. Here, Murray thrived and with him, the fortunes of Russell & Morgan:

The advent of Mr. Murray marked the advancement of the concern to the first rank as a playing card manufacturing establishment. He not only made the plant highly efficient, but when he found that any device was needed he evolved it himself and astounded his company by his ability to meet any emergency no matter how difficult.

Murray had a falling out with Russell & Morgan and in 1886 went off on his own to form the National Playing Card Company in Indianapolis – a move that Russell & Morgan came to regret. According to one source, as a competitor, Murray "was a serious menace to the Russell & Morgan Company and as a matter of self preservation, the latter bought him out, consolidating the Indianapolis concern with the United States Playing Card Company."

As a concession, Murray was given a "block of stock in the merger" and "unrestricted charge of the manufacture of playing cards." After this, he was steadfast in his loyalty to the United States Playing Card Company, even turning down an offer of $2 million by a big printing house in New York.

Murray is credited with several inventions including the re-usable paper box, a machine for cutting cardboard, and a streamlined process for printing and packaging playing cards.

== Marriage and family ==
Murray married childhood sweetheart Annie E. Reilley. They had five children: Victor C. Murray, who followed him into the United States Playing Card Company; William J. Murray, a well known businessman in New York, married to the daughter of John F. Ahearn, a member of the New York State Senate from 1890 to 1902; Jane Murray Egan, married to Clifford Egan, son of Thomas P. Egan of Cincinnati manufacturer J.A. Fay & Egan Company; Miss Geneva M. Murray; and Samuel J. Murray, Jr.

== Death ==
On August 19, 1915, Murray died of pneumonia. He is buried at the Holy Cross and Saint Joseph Cemetery in Indianapolis, Indiana.
