= William J. Murray (politician) =

American politician

William J. Murray (c. 1884 – August 20, 1966) was an American politician from New York. He was born in 1884 to Samuel J. Murray and Anna E. (Reilly) Murray. His father was a successful businessman and inventor, who made his mark on the United States Playing Card Company.

== Biography ==
Murray was a member of the New York State Senate (14th D.) from 1937 to 1944, sitting in the 160th, 161st, 162nd, 163rd and 164th New York State Legislatures.

== Personal ==
William J. Murray was married to Anna Marie Ahearn, who was the daughter of Senator John F. Ahearn of New York. They had two children: Samuel J. Murray (December 7, 1918 - April 28, 2004) and John A. Murray (May 5, 1923 - March 5, 2009). Samuel J. Murray was named Special Assistant State Attorney General and Sr. Asst. Counsel, NY State Crime Commission by Gov. Thomas E. Dewey. John A. Murray was an attorney for the New York City Transit Authority.

William J. Murray died on August 20, 1966, in St. Vincent's Hospital in Manhattan.

== Sources ==
New York State Senate
Preceded by Samuel Mandelbaum	New York State Senate; 14th District; 1937–1944	Succeeded by Joseph E. Parisi
