= Horn & Hardart =

American food services company known for automats

- Logo used from 1966, designed by Don Ervin

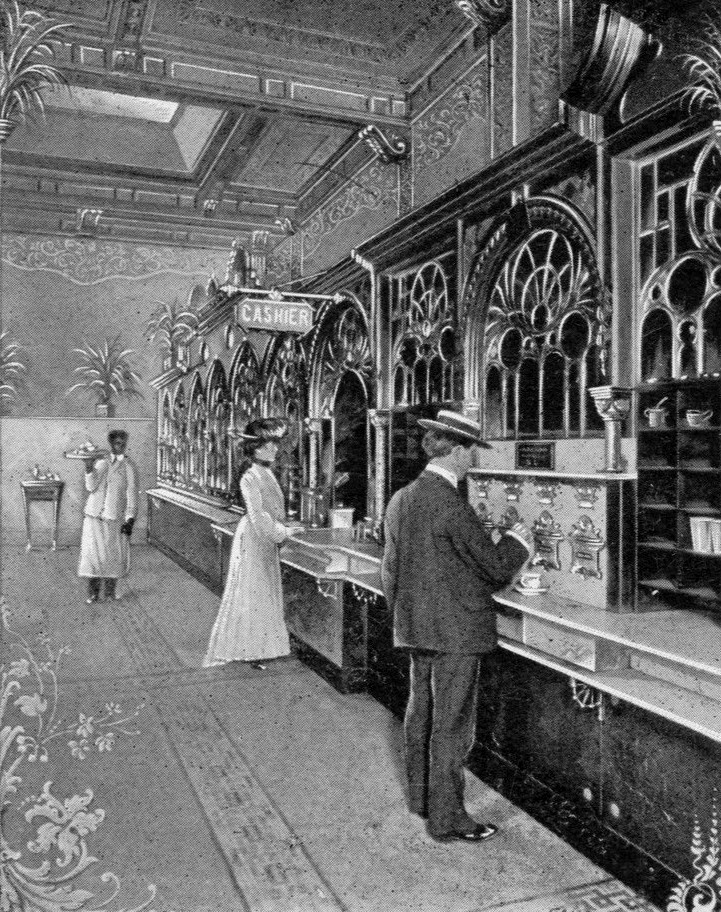
- First Automat, 818–820 Chestnut Street, Philadelphia (1904 postcard)
- Type: Privately held company
- Industry: Restaurants
- Founded: 1888; 138 years ago (partnership); 1902; 124 years ago (first automat)
- Key people: Joseph Horn, Frank Hardart
- Revenue: USD

Horn & Hardart was a food services company in the United States noted for operating the first food service automats in Philadelphia, New York City, and Baltimore. Horn & Hardart automats ushered in the fast food era. At their height, they were the largest restaurant chain in the world, with more than 100 locations.

Philadelphia's Joseph Horn (1861–1941) and German-born, New Orleans-raised Frank Hardart (1850–1918) opened their first restaurant in Philadelphia, on December 22, 1888. The 11-by-17-foot (3.4 m × 5.2 m) lunchroom at 39 South Thirteenth Street had no tables, only a counter with 15 stools. The location was formerly the print shop of Dunlap & Claypoole, printers to the American Congress and George Washington.

By introducing Philadelphia to New Orleans-style coffee, which Hardart promoted as their "gilt-edge" brew, they made their tiny luncheonette a local attraction. News of the coffee spread, and the business flourished. They incorporated as the Horn & Hardart Baking Company in 1898.

At its peak, the company operated more than 100 restaurants and a popular chain of retail outlets. The lack of a succession plan, changing demographics, the rapid rise of fast-food chains, and poor strategic decisions from the early 1960s onward proved too much to overcome, and the last restaurant closed in 1991.

== History ==
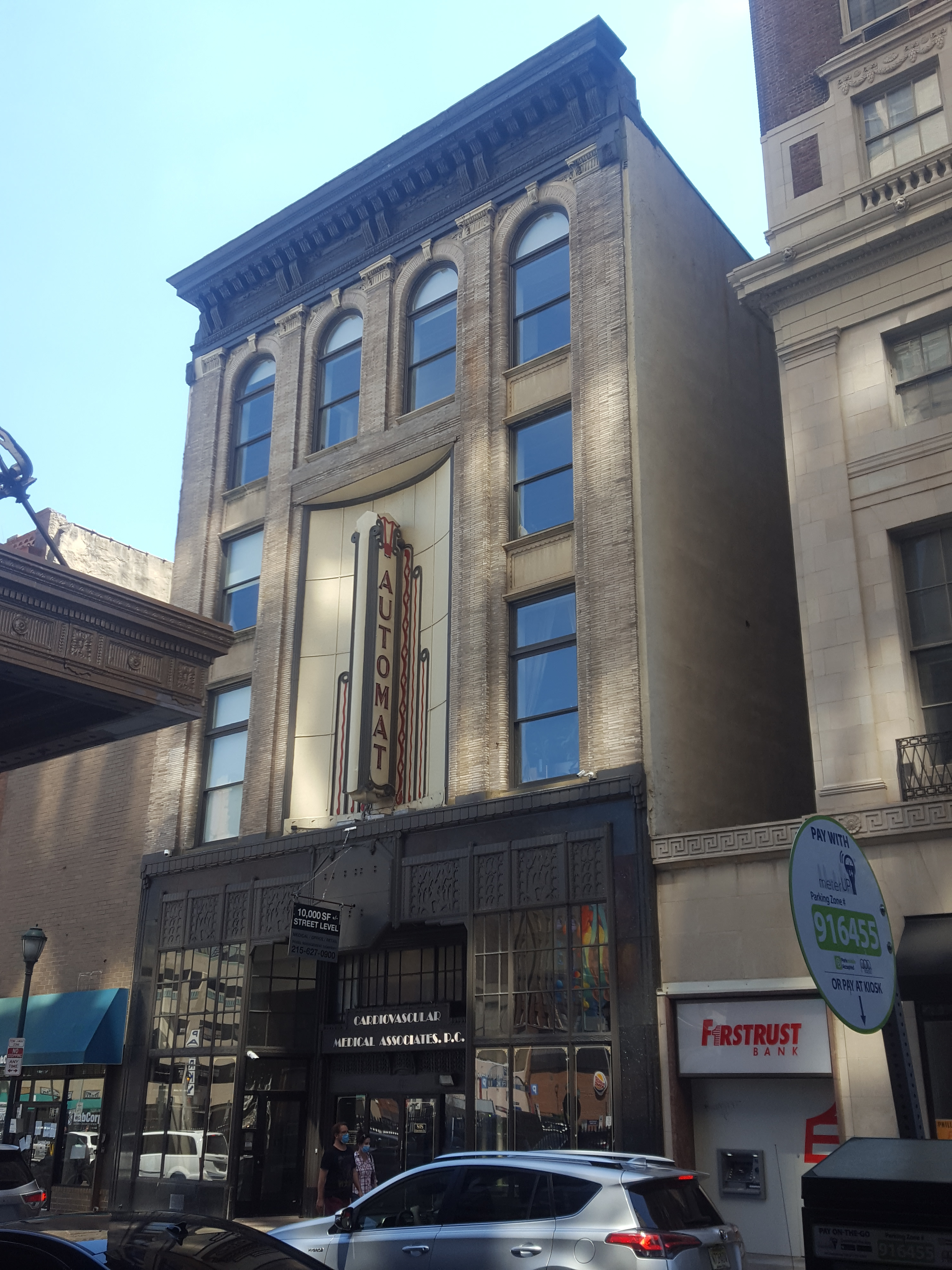
818 Chestnut St, Philadelphia, site of first U.S. Automat, with original Horn & Hardart sign still up in July 2020

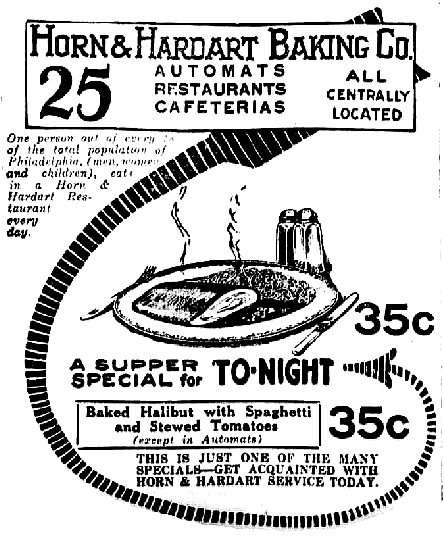
Newspaper ad from 1922 for the 25 Philadelphia locations of Horn and Hardart automats, restaurants, and cafeterias, claiming that the equivalent of one out of every sixteen people in the city ate in one of their establishments daily

Joseph Horn had traveled in Europe and experienced the revolutionary new form of restaurant known as the Automat, pioneered by Max Sielaff in Berlin. Inspired by the success and decor of this new form of food service that eliminated wait staffs but still served high quality fresh food, Horn persuaded his partner Frank Hardart to open the first automat in the U.S., which made its debut on June 9, 1902, at 818 Chestnut Street in Philadelphia. It was the first non-European restaurant to receive patented vending machines from Sielaff's Automat GmbH factory in Berlin, the creators also of the first chocolate bar vending machine for Ludwig Stollwerck.

Ten years later, the first New York Automat opened in Times Square, on July 2, 1912, and later that week, the third opened at Broadway and E 14th St, near Union Square.

In 1924, Horn & Hardart opened retail stores to sell prepackaged automat favorites. Using the advertising slogan, "Less Work for Mother," the company popularized the notion of easily served "take-out" food as an equivalent to "home-cooked" meals.

The Horn & Hardart Automats were particularly popular during the Depression era, when their macaroni and cheese, baked beans, and creamed spinach were staple offerings. In the 1930s, union conflicts resulted in vandalism, as noted by Christopher Gray in The New York Times:

In 1932 the police blamed members of the glaziers union for vandalism against 24 Horn & Hardart and Bickford's restaurants in Manhattan, including the one at 488 Eighth Avenue. Witnesses said that a passenger in a car driving by used a slingshot to damage and even break the plate glass show windows. Glaziers union representatives had complained about nonunion employees installing glass at the restaurants.

By the time of Horn's death in 1941, the business had 157 retail shops and restaurants in the Philadelphia, New York, and Baltimore areas, serving some 500,000 patrons a day. During the 1940s and the 1950s, more than 50 New York Horn & Hardart restaurants served 350,000 customers a day.

In 1953, the company split into two independent public corporations: the New York entity was named the Horn & Hardart Company, and the Philadelphia entity was named the Horn & Hardart Baking Company. Shares of the first were traded on the American Stock Exchange, and the second on the Philadelphia Stock Exchange.

The self-service restaurants operated for nearly a century, with the business's last New York City storefront closing in 1991.

== Operation ==
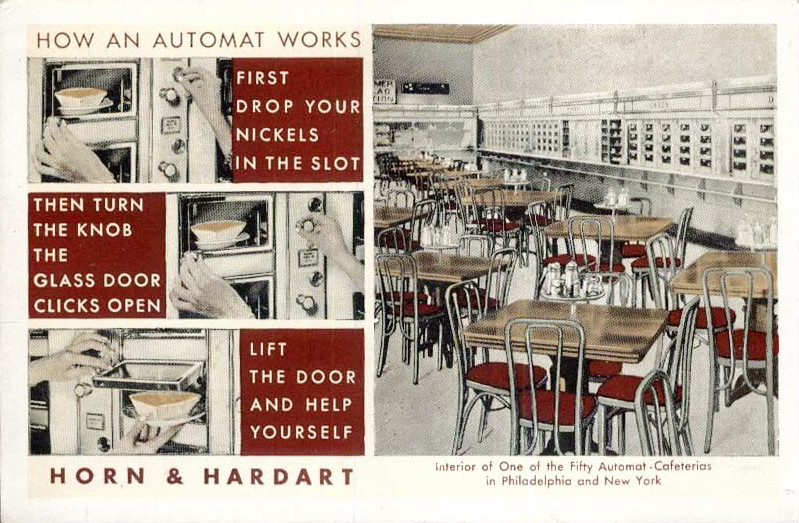
Horn & Hardart postcard, circa 1930s

In their heyday, Horn & Hardart automats were popular, busy eateries. They featured prepared foods displayed behind small coin- and token-operated glass-doored windows, beginning with buns, beans, fish cakes, and coffee. As late as the 1950s, one could enjoy a large, if somewhat plain, meal for under $1.00. Each stack of dispensers had a metal drum that staff on the other side of the vending wall could rotate to refill its windows. Every dispenser had a slot for coins or tokens purchased from a cashier, with tokens worth up to 75¢ for more expensive items. A knob was rotated to capture the fee and unlock the door. Dispensers were room temperature, heated, or cooled as appropriate.

With success, the chain began lunch and dinner entrees, such as fish, beef stew, and Salisbury steak with mashed potatoes.

Carolyn Hughes Crowley described the appeal of the Automats:

In huge rectangular halls filled with shiny, lacquered tables, women with rubber tips on their fingers — "nickel throwers," as they became known — in glass booths gave customers the five-cent pieces required to operate the dispensers. After depositing the appropriate amount the compartment opened to present the desired food to the customer through a small glass. Diners picked up hot foods at buffet-style steam tables. The word "automat" comes from the Greek automatos, meaning "self-acting." Still, the Automats were heavily staffed. As a customer removed a compartment's contents, a worker quickly slipped another sandwich, salad, side dish, or dessert into the vacated chamber.

== Promotions ==
=== The Horn and Hardart Children's Hour ===
==== Radio program ====
Beginning in 1927, Horn & Hardart sponsored a radio program, The Horn and Hardart Children's Hour, a variety show with a cast of children, including some who as adults became well-known performers (such as Bernadette Peters and Frankie Avalon). The program was broadcast first on WCAU Radio in Philadelphia, hosted by Stan Lee Broza. It was broadcast on NBC Radio in New York during the 1940s and 1950s. The original New York host was Paul Douglas, succeeded by Ralph Edwards and finally Ed Herlihy.. Rosemary Clooney, Frankie Avalon, Bernadette Peters, Gregory Hines, and Madeline Kahn all got their starts on the show.

==== Television program ====
The television premiere of The Horn & Hardart Children's Hour aired on WCAU-TV in Philadelphia in 1948, succeeded by WNBT in New York in 1949, and was telecast on Sunday mornings. Stan Lee Broza hosted in Philadelphia, and Ed Herlihy in New York.

== Decline ==
For a long time, the price of coffee was 5 cents, or one nickel. On November 29, 1950 the price was raised to two nickels.

The restaurant chain remained popular into the 1960s, operating sit-down service restaurants, cafeterias, retail stores, and bakery shops in addition to its automats. In the late 1960s, efforts were made to update decor and redecorate some restaurants relevant to surrounding neighborhoods; thus, the Automat on 14th Street was decorated with psychedelic posters. The chain rapidly lost ground to the explosive rise of fast-food chains, which offered cheap fare, a limited menu, and easy-to-carry take-out.

By the mid-1970s, the company began to replace some of its restaurants with its own Burger King franchises. Horn & Hardart further expanded its fast food operations in 1981, acquiring the Bojangles' Famous Chicken n' Biscuits restaurants, which it sold to a California investment company in 1990 for $20 million. More similar restaurant franchises and associations were to follow.

In 1979, Horn & Hardart agreed to buy the Royal Inn in Las Vegas for $7.4 million. By late 1980, the sale had been completed; the property was rebranded as the Royal Americana Hotel, with a New York theme. A $3.5 million renovation increased the room count to 300. By 1982 though, the hotel was experiencing substantial losses, and Horn & Hardart decided to close it. They reportedly agreed in December to sell the property to an investment group for $15.4 million.

The last New York Horn & Hardart Automat (on the southeast corner of 42nd Street and Third Avenue) closed on April 9, 1991. Horn & Hardart continued to own a catalog division; it renamed itself Hanover Direct in 1993. That year, the company bought Gump's; it sold it to an investment group in 2005. Hanover Direct purchased International Male in 1987 when founder Gene Burkard retired.

== Revivals ==
In 1987, Horn & Hardart opened two 1950s-themed Dine-O-Mat restaurants in New York. They closed less than two years later.

In 1986 its only remaining Philadelphia area restaurant was in Bala Cynwyd, Pennsylvania. In summer 1987 the company opened another restaurant in Bensalem, Pennsylvania, a second in the Philadelphia area. Its planned square footage was 15,000 square feet (1,400 m^{2}). The space was a former Duff's Cafeteria. In December 1988 it was to open another location in Jenkintown, Pennsylvania.

In the early 1990s, two entrepreneurs bought the Philadelphia company (Horn & Hardart Baking Co.) out of bankruptcy. While they did not open any restaurants, they recreated a dozen of the most famous dishes, including macaroni and cheese, Harvard beets, tapioca pudding, and cucumber salad. The food was packed fresh, refrigerated, and sold in supermarkets throughout Philadelphia and New Jersey. The food was still available up until 2002.

The Horn & Hardart name was used for a now-dormant chain of coffee shops in Pennsylvania and New Jersey. The Horn & Hardart Coffee Co. closed its last coffee shop in 2005.

As of 2016, the Horn & Hardart – Bakery Cafe is the name of a coffee shop in Philadelphia, Pennsylvania.

The company's assets were acquired in 2015 as Horn & Hardart Coffee. They recreated the original East Coast City Roast, and branded coffee was offered on their website as of 2016. They also offered a subscription service called The Automat Club.

As of November 2022, the official Horn & Hardart website announced that the brand had returned with a recreation of the original Automat Blend of coffee. The website also says the company is in the process of modernizing the Automat and restoring the brand online and in retail. The new CEO, David Arena, published his vision for the company online, which he says includes reopening an Automat in the future.

== Gallery ==
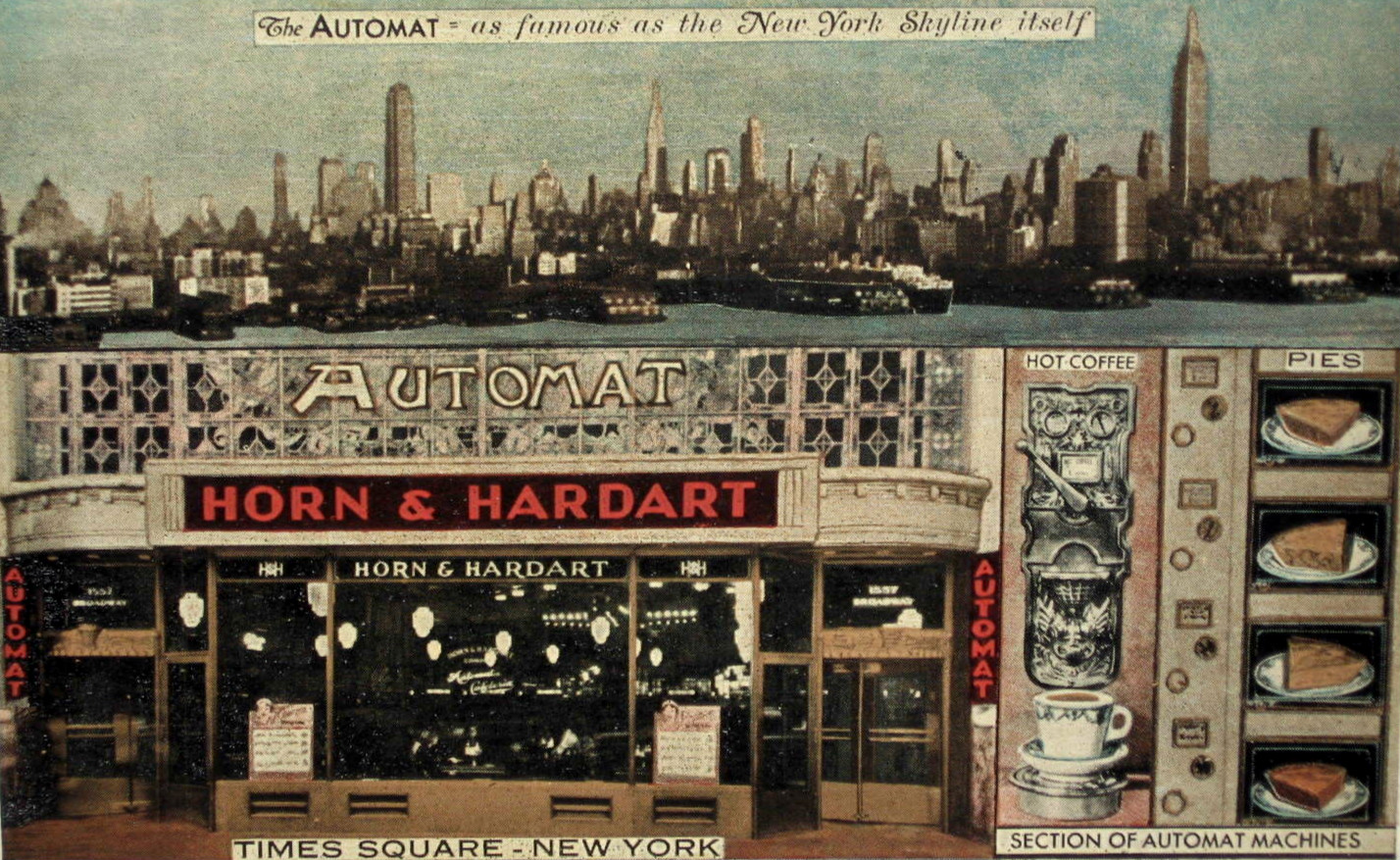
Automat in Times Square, circa 1939

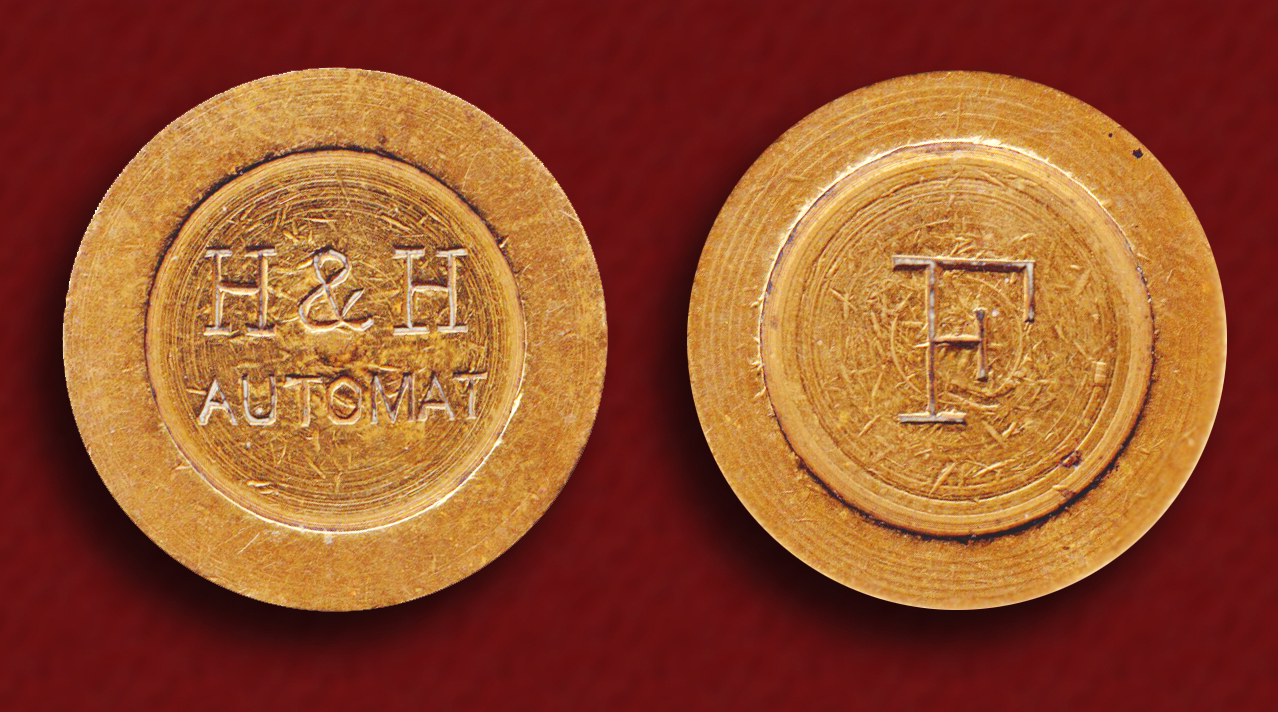
A brass H&H token

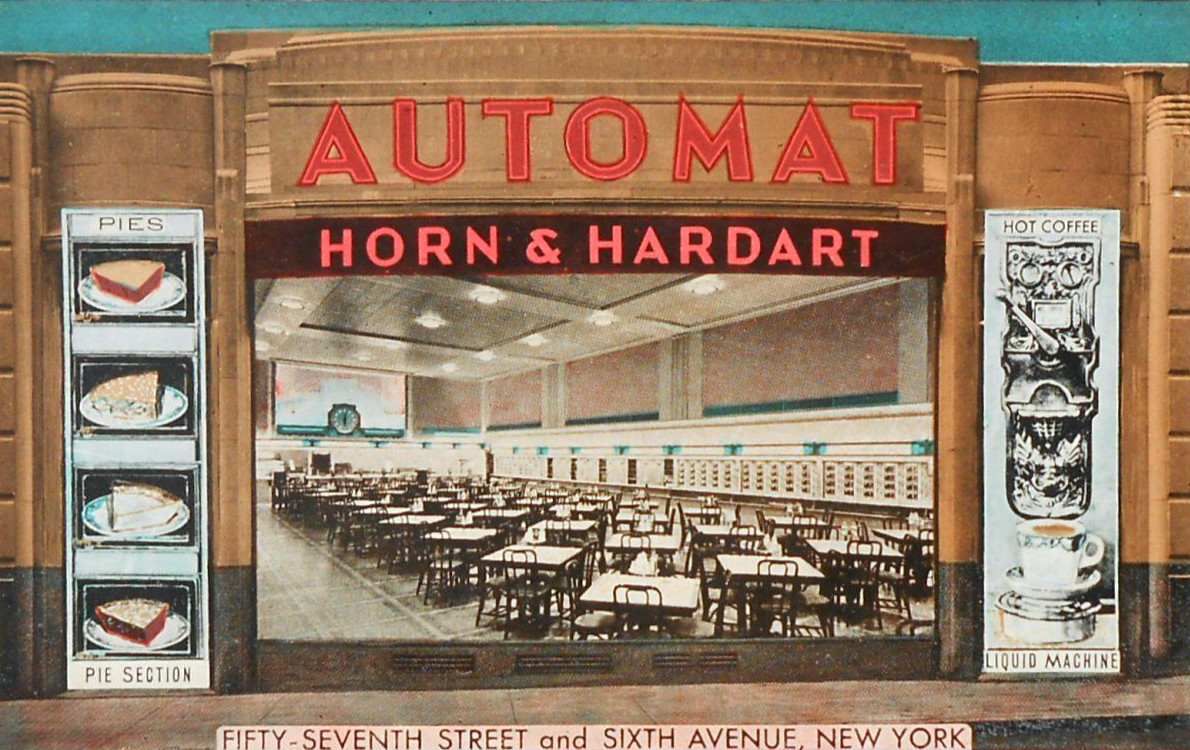
1930s-era Automat at 104 West 57th Street near Sixth Avenue showing areas for beverages and pies at right of dining area

== In popular culture ==
=== Literature ===
- In Paul Auster's 2017 novel 4 3 2 1, Ferguson visits the restaurant, which is described as a place of "twentieth-century American efficiency in its craziest, most delightful incarnation".
- In the 1967 novel, The Mixed-Up Files of Mrs. Basil E. Frankweiler by E. L. Konigsburg, the main characters eat using coins from the fountain of the Metropolitan Museum of Art.

=== Museum exhibits ===
- On June 22, 2012, the New York Public Library opened an exhibition titled "Lunch Hour NYC". The exhibition "looks back at more than a century of New York lunches, when the city's early power brokers invented the 'power lunch' ..... and visitors with guidebooks thronged Times Square to eat lunch at the Automat." Among many educational and entertaining items is a fully restored wall of Automat windows. The exhibit was scheduled to run until February 17, 2013.
- The Smithsonian's National Museum of American History previously had displayed in its cafe an ornate 35-foot Automat section, complete with mirrors, marble and marquetry, from Philadelphia's 1902 Horn & Hardart, although this exhibit has since been removed. In 2006 Paul and Tom Hardart donated the business records for the Horn and Hardart chain of restaurants and retail stores to the Smithsonian Archives; the records include annual reports, business correspondence, operating manuals, photographs, sales materials, and printed materials such as employee newsletters and clippings.

=== Music ===
- Concerto for Horn and Hardart is a classical music parody written by Peter Schickele, one of many which he attributes to the fictional composer P.D.Q. Bach.
- The song Diamonds Are a Girl's Best Friend by Leo Robin and Jule Styne mentions the Automat in its lyrics.
- The song "Old Fashioned Christmas" by Frank Sinatra mentions the Automat as a place where you can't find "Mom, there in the kitchen basting the Christmas bird".

=== Stage productions ===
- In the song "Colored Spade" from the musical Hair (1967), the character Hud (a militant African-American) satirically assigns to himself various racial stereotypes including "Table cleaner at Horn & Hardart".
- The original Broadway set for the musical The Producers (2001) incorporated some of the Automat.
- Neil Simon's play The Odd Couple (1965) includes a reference to Horn & Hardart: Cecily Pigeon says to Oscar and Felix, "Well then, we can eat up in our place. We have plenty of Horn and Hardart's."

=== Television ===
- Jack Benny held a promotional black-tie party to launch his television show The Jack Benny Program on October 29, 1950, at the New York City Automat. Playing on his reputation as a cheapskate, Benny greeted his guests at the door and handed each one a roll of nickels so they could get what they wanted to eat.
- In The Marvelous Mrs. Maisel, Season 5, Episode 9, "Four Minutes", an H&H Automat is the backdrop for a scene between Midge and Susie in the early part of the episode.
- In Arrested Development, Season 4 Remix: Fateful Consequences, Episode 6; "The Parent Traps", the name Horn & Hardart is referenced as an inneundo between Lucille Austero and Buster Bluth.
- The 1962 The Flintstones episode "The Rock Vegas Story" features Fred and Barney visiting a Horn & Hardart-esque automat called "Bedrock Rock-O-Mat Restaurant".

=== Film ===
- Easy Living, a screwball comedy written by Preston Sturges and directed by Mitchell Leisen, features an extended scene in the automat, with Jean Arthur and Ray Milland. When malfunctioning automat windows flip open, the ensuing scramble for free food sparks a comedic riot.
- Sylvester the Cat visits an automat in the 1956 Merrie Melodies short Tree Cornered Tweety, where Tweety is locked in an automat slot labeled "Tweety Pie", and Bugs Bunny visits one in the 1947 short A Hare Grows in Manhattan and buys a slice of pie that he smashes in a dog's face.
- That Touch of Mink (1962), a comedy with Cary Grant, Doris Day, and Gig Young, who visit the Automat in New York City
- Marnie (1964), directed by Alfred Hitchcock . Mark's father mentions that he insists on "good Horn & Hardart's" [butter] cake at tea time. In another scene, when Marnie and Mark are leaving for their honeymoon, Mark's father comments that he chose the wedding cake bakery recommended by Horn & Hardart's executives.
- When Harry Met Sally (1989). In the interview with the old couple at the beginning of the movie, the husband mentions that he was sitting in a Horn & Hardart cafeteria.
- Metropolitan (1990), the first film of Whit Stillman's classic trilogy, contains a scene in which Tom Townsend and Charlie Black have a conversation inside (and then depart the entrance of) the last New York Horn & Hardart Automat at the southeast corner of 42nd Street and 3rd Avenue.
- The Automat (2021), a documentary about the chain by Lisa Hurwitz, featuring Mel Brooks, Carl Reiner, Colin Powell, and Ruth Bader Ginsburg
