= Automated restaurant =

Restaurant with robotic staff

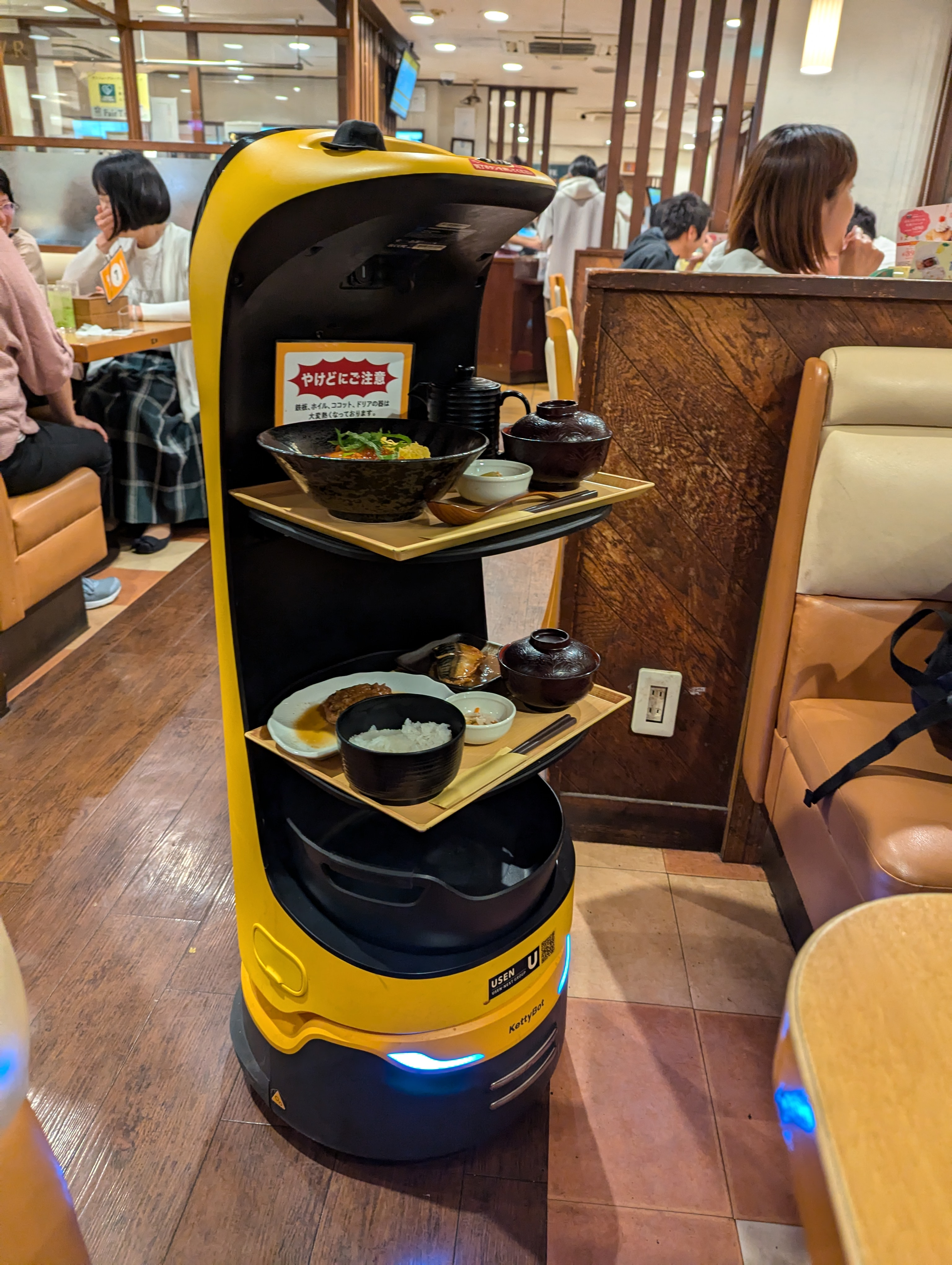
A robot serving food to customers at a restaurant in Chiba Prefecture, Japan, in 2024

An automated restaurant or robotic restaurant is a restaurant that uses robots to do tasks such as delivering food and drink to the tables or cooking the food. Restaurant automation means the use of a restaurant management system to automate some or occasionally all of the major operations of a restaurant establishment.

More recently, restaurants are opening that have completely or partially automated their services. These may include: taking orders, preparing food, serving, and billing. A few fully automated restaurants operate without any human intervention whatsoever. Robots are designed to help and sometimes replace human labour (such as waiters and chefs). The automation of restaurants may also allow for the option of greater customization of an order.

== History ==
=== Vending machines ===
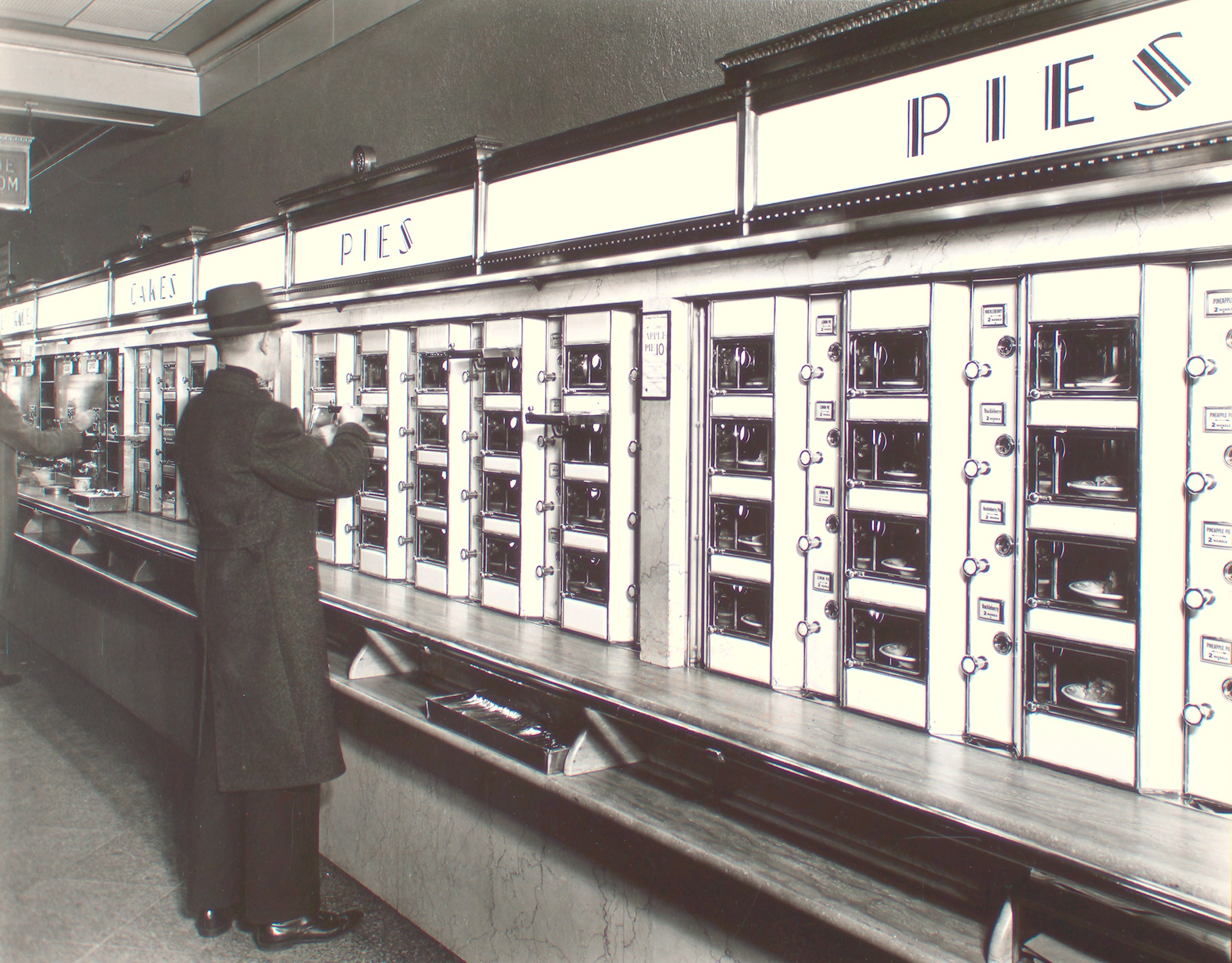
Historic automat vending machine restaurant, c. 1936

In the late 19th and early 20th century a number of restaurants served food solely through vending machines. These restaurants were called automats or, in Japan, shokkenki. Customers ordered their food directly through the machines.

=== Sushi conveyors ===
Yoshiaki Shiraishi is a Japanese innovator who is known for the creation of conveyor belt sushi. He had the idea following difficulty staffing his small sushi restaurant and managing the restaurant on his own. He was inspired seeing beer bottles on a conveyor belt in an Asahi brewery. Yoshiaki's restaurants are an early example of restaurant automation; they used a conveyor belt to distribute dishes around the restaurant, eliminating the need for waiters. This example of automation dates back to the Japanese economic miracle; the first of Yoshiaki's conveyor belt sushi restaurants was opened under the name Mawaru Genroku Sushi in 1958, in Osaka.

=== Partial automation ===
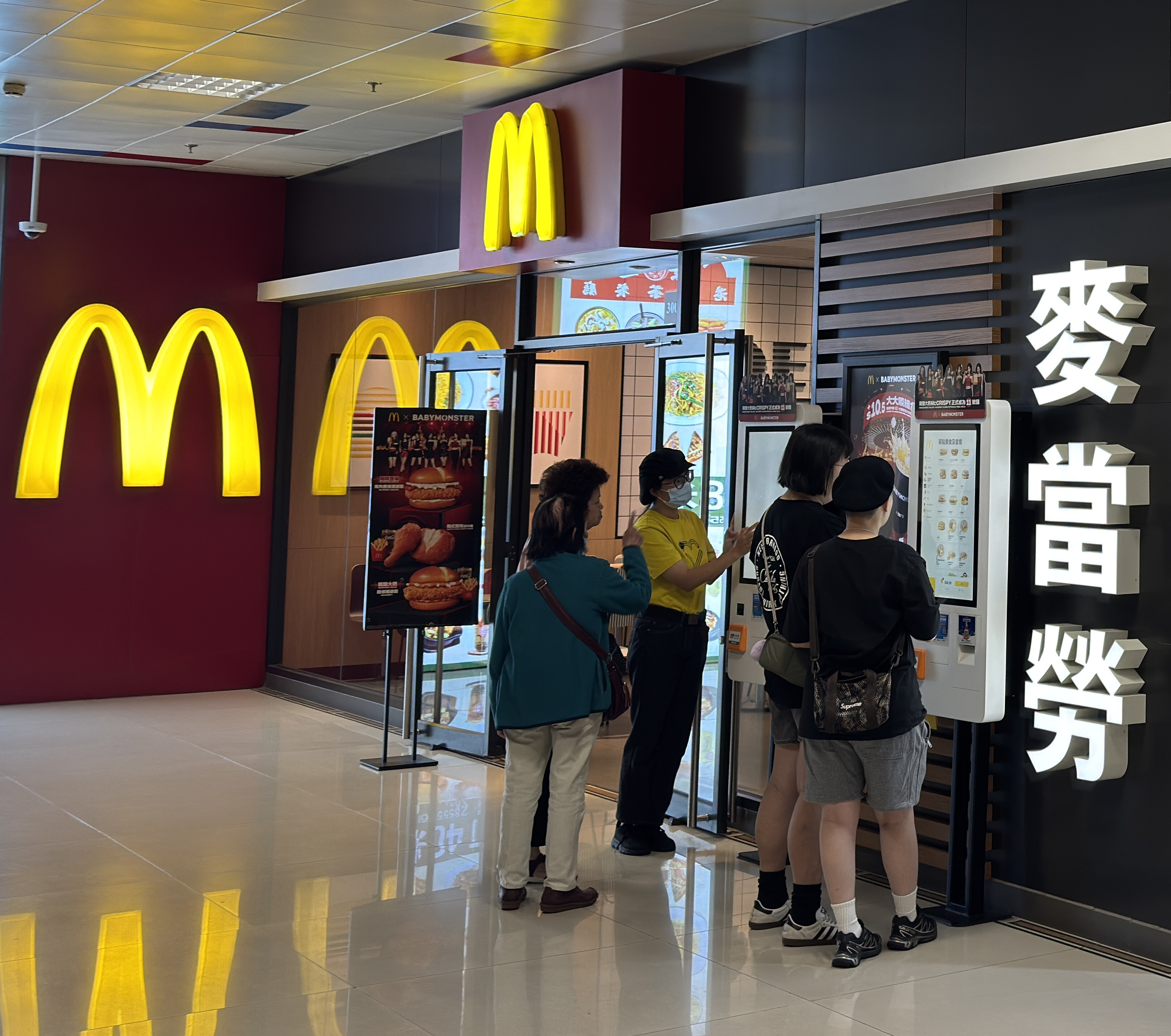
Touchscreen menus at a McDonald's outlet in Macau, in 2025

As of 2011, across Europe, McDonald's had already begun implementing 7,000 touch screen kiosks that could handle cashiering duties.

From 2015 to 2020, Zume had an automated pizza parlor. Later companies would try to produce smaller, less ambitious devices, with one robotics company producing a machine that could automate the slowest and most repetitive parts of assembling a pizza, such as spreading pizza sauce or placing slices of pepperoni, while leaving other customizations to employees.

In 2020, a restaurant in the Netherlands began trialling the use of a robot to serve guests.

In September 2021, Karakuri's 'Semblr' food service robot served personalised lunches for the 4,000 employees of grocery technology solutions provider ocado Group's head offices in Hatfield, UK. 2,700 different combinations of dishes were on offer. Customers could specify in grams what hot and cold items, proteins, sauces and fresh toppings they wanted.

In 2021, Columbia University School of Engineering and Applied Science engineers developed a method of cooking 3D printed chicken with software-controlled robotic lasers. The “Digital Food” team exposed raw 3D printed chicken structures to both blue and infrared light. They then assessed the cooking depth, colour development, moisture retention and flavour differences of the laser-cooked 3D printed samples in comparison to stove-cooked meat.

In June 2022 a California nonprofit chain of residential communities, Front Porch, experimented with robots in dining rooms at two locations to supplement wait staff by carrying plated food and drink to tables, and removing dishes. 65% of residents found the robots helpful, with 51% saying they let the staff spend more quality time with diners. 51% of staff were "excited" and 58% said they enabled more quality time with diners. The chain has 19 senior living communities (and 35 affordable housing communities), so it has potential to expand robots to more dining rooms. It is shifting to memory care, which may affect plans.

== South Korea ==
=== Adoption history ===
On 31 January 2020, LG Electronics and CJ Foodville introduced an LG CLOi ServeBot at the Seoul Station branch of Jeiljemyunso, a restaurant operated by CJ Foodville. According to LG Electronics, the robot used autonomous navigation and obstacle-avoidance technology to transport food to customers' tables and return empty dishes.

=== Restaurant work ===
A 2024 Korea Labor Institute report examined serving robots in South Korean restaurants, distinguishing between their use as substitutes for serving staff and their use as tools to assist existing workers. The report identified labor shortages and efforts to reduce labor costs as reasons for adoption among restaurant owners.

The report described some restaurants where robots carried dishes to a handoff point and staff placed them on customers' tables. It also identified practical constraints, including limited space for robots to move between tables and the risk of burns when customers transfer hot dishes from a robot to the table.

=== Customer experience ===
A 2020 study by Ha-Won Jang and Soo-Bum Lee analyzed 294 online survey responses from adult customers who had visited restaurants using serving robots in South Korea. The study found that perceived benefits were positively associated with perceived value, which was in turn positively associated with customer satisfaction and intention to revisit. Satisfaction was also positively associated with revisit intention.

Respondents completed the survey online and recalled a restaurant visit from the previous three months. The study measured willingness to return through survey responses.

== Rationales ==
=== Advantages ===
- Efficiency: Automated restaurants can significantly enhance operational efficiency by minimizing human error and reducing service time. With automated ordering, payment, and food preparation systems, customers can enjoy faster service and reduced waiting times.
- Cost savings: By reducing the need for human staff, automated restaurants can potentially lower labor costs. This can be particularly beneficial in areas with high labor expenses, as it allows for better resource allocation and cost management.
- Consistency: Automation ensures consistency in food quality and presentation. With precise portion control and standardized cooking methods, customers can expect the same quality and taste in their meals every time they visit.
- Enhanced customer experience: Self-service kiosks and automated systems provide customers with control and convenience. They can customize their orders, browse through menu options, and pay seamlessly, creating a more interactive and satisfying dining experience.

=== Disadvantages ===
- Lack of personal touch: Automated restaurants may lack the personal interaction and warmth that traditional restaurants provide. Some customers prefer the human touch, personalized recommendations, and the social aspect of dining out.
- Technical issues: Reliance on technology means that technical glitches and malfunctions can occur, resulting in service disruptions or delays. Maintenance and technical support become critical in ensuring smooth operations.
- Limited menu complexity: The automation process may be better suited for standardized menu items rather than complex or customized dishes. The ability to cater to unique dietary preferences or accommodate special requests may be limited.
- Employment implications: Automated restaurants may result in job losses for traditional restaurant staff, potentially impacting the local workforce. It is important to consider the social and economic implications of adopting such technology.

== Locations ==
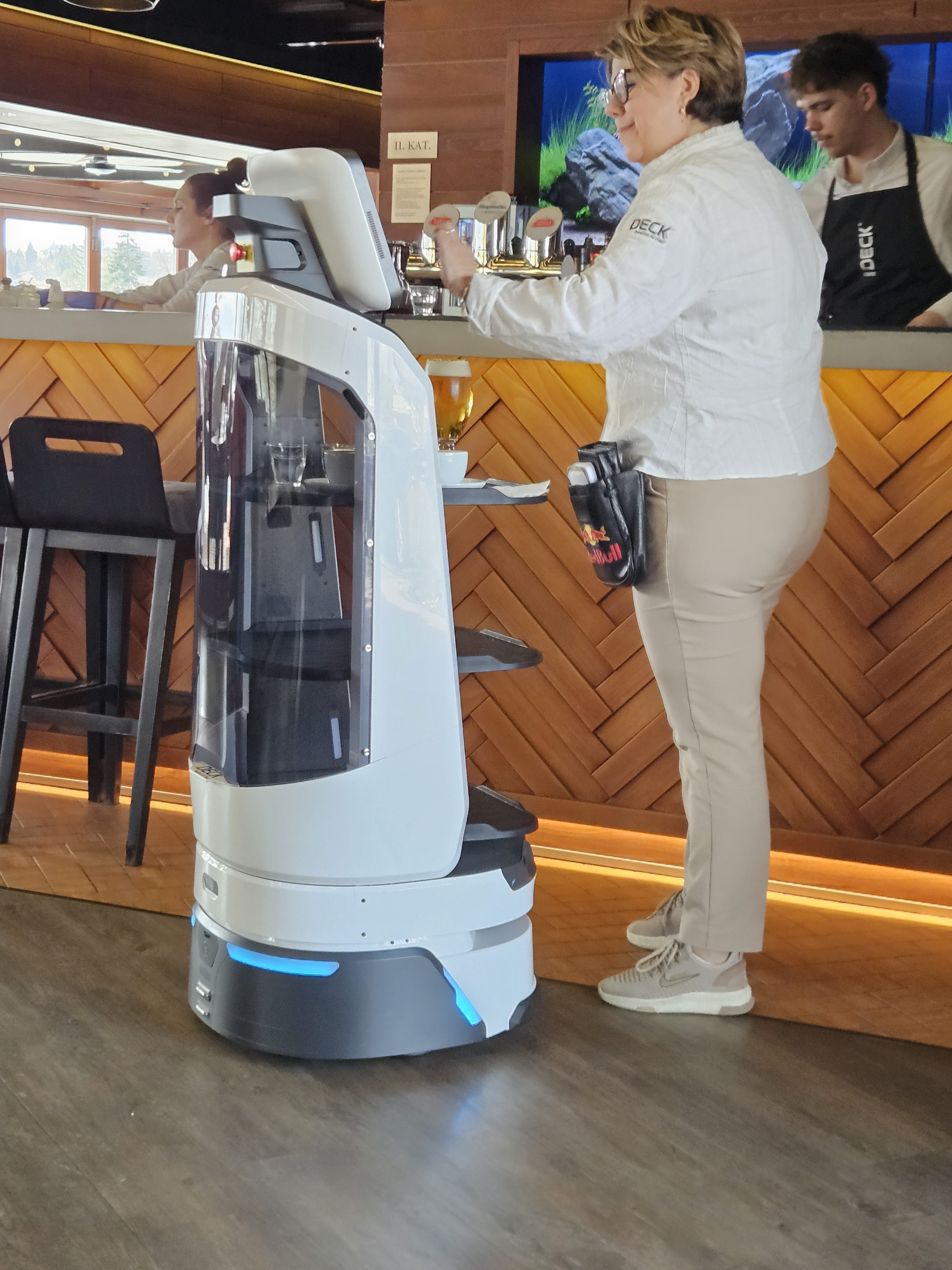
A customer placing an order with a robotic server at a restaurant in Szombathely, Hungary, in 2025

Automated restaurants have been opening in many countries. Examples include:

- Nala Restaurant in Naperville, Illinois
- Fritz's Railroad Restaurant in Kansas City, Kansas
- Výtopna, a Railway Restaurant using model trains: franchise of various restaurants and coffeehouses in the Czech Republic
- Bagger's Restaurant in Nuremberg, Germany
- FuA-Men Restaurant, a ramen restaurant located in Nagoya, Japan
- Fōster Nutrition in Buenos Aires, Argentina
- Dalu Robot Restaurant in Jinan, China
- Haohai Robot Restaurant in Harbin, China
- Robot Kitchen Restaurant in Hong Kong
- Robo-Chef restaurant in Tehran, Iran, started in 2017, is the first robotic and "waiterless" restaurant of the Middle East.
- MIT graduates opened Spyce Kitchens in downtown Boston, Massachusetts, in 2018
- Foodom, under Country Garden Holdings, opened January 12, 2020, in Guangzhou, China
- Robot Chacha, the first robot restaurant of India, is planning to open in the capital city of New Delhi.
- Kura Revolving Sushi Bar, with a number of locations in the United States, uses a tablets at tables for ordering, a conveyor belt to deliver food, and robots to deliver drinks and condiments.
- Chipotle Mexican Grill is beginning to deploy the Hyphen Makeline, which assembles up to 350 bowls and salads automatically per hour, and Chippy, an automatic tortilla chip fryer made by Miso Robotics.
- Serious Dumplings in Boca Raton, Florida
