= Kaassoufflé =

Dutch snack

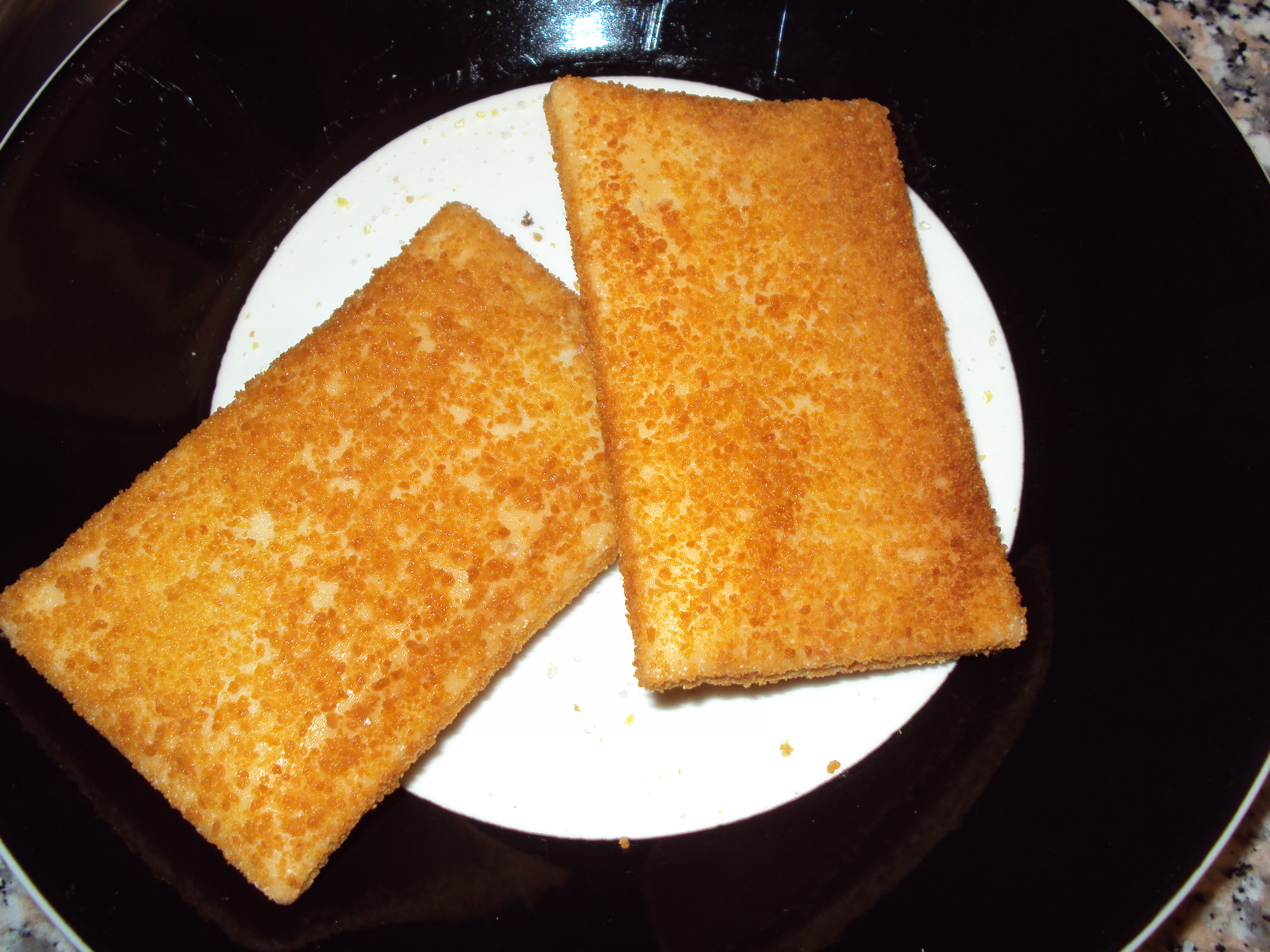
Rectangular kaassoufflés on a plate.

A kaassoufflé (Dutch: [ˈkaːsuˌfleː]; lit. 'cheese soufflé') is a Dutch snack of melted cheese inside a thin dough-based wrap which has been breaded and then deep-fried. They are also popular in the Dutch-speaking part of Belgium.

== Overview ==
A kaassoufflé is thought to be influenced by Indonesian street food called gorengan (fritter). It is either bought ready-made frozen and deep-fried at home, or ordered at snackbars in the Netherlands, where it is one of the few vegetarian fast-food snacks available. At certain Dutch fastfood outlets, such as FEBO or Smullers, it is possible to purchase a kaassoufflé without having to order it at the counter; instead it can be had directly from an automatiek, a coin-operated vending machine. Kaassoufflé is also a popular snack to be served at a borrel, an informal Dutch gathering with drinks and snacks (the word "borrel" originally referred to a small glass in which distilled beverages, usually jenever, is served).

Typically this snack comes in two different shapes: either as a large rectangle measuring approximately 10 cm by 5 cm (4" by 2"), or shaped like a half moon of about 10 cm (5") in length. Smaller versions, called mini-kaassoufflés, are usually sold for consumption at home, or at the aforementioned borrel where they are usually eaten as part of a bittergarnituur, a selection of snacks to go with drinks. Kaassoufflés are not limited to having only a Gouda-like cheese as a filling. Additional flavourings can be added to the cheese, such as ham and spinach, or it can also be made with different types of cheese. Another variety of kaassoufflé is the oven-baked type. This is simply done by wrapping a slice of cheese, with or without additional spices, inside puff pastry and then baking it in an oven.

Although the name of this snack contains the word "soufflé", it has very little in common with a real soufflé which, indeed, can contain cheese and can therefore also be called a kaassoufflé in the Dutch language.

== Consumption practices ==
A kaassoufflé is usually eaten on its own, with mustard, mayonnaise, regular ketchup, or curried ketchup. A broodje kaassoufflé is the snack served in a bun.

== See also ==
- Fried cheese
- Rissole
- Pastel

== Gallery ==
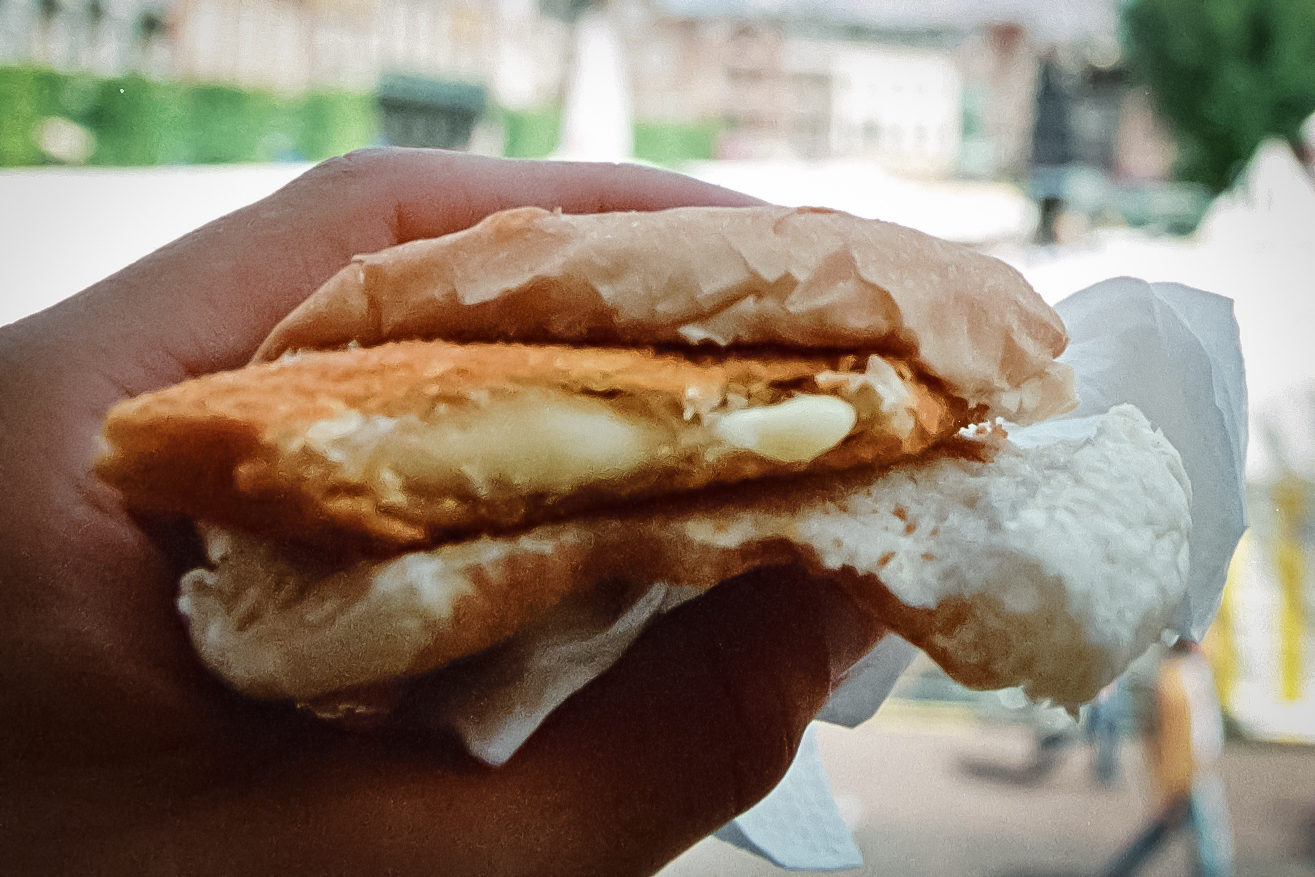
A broodje kaassoufflé showing the melted cheese filling

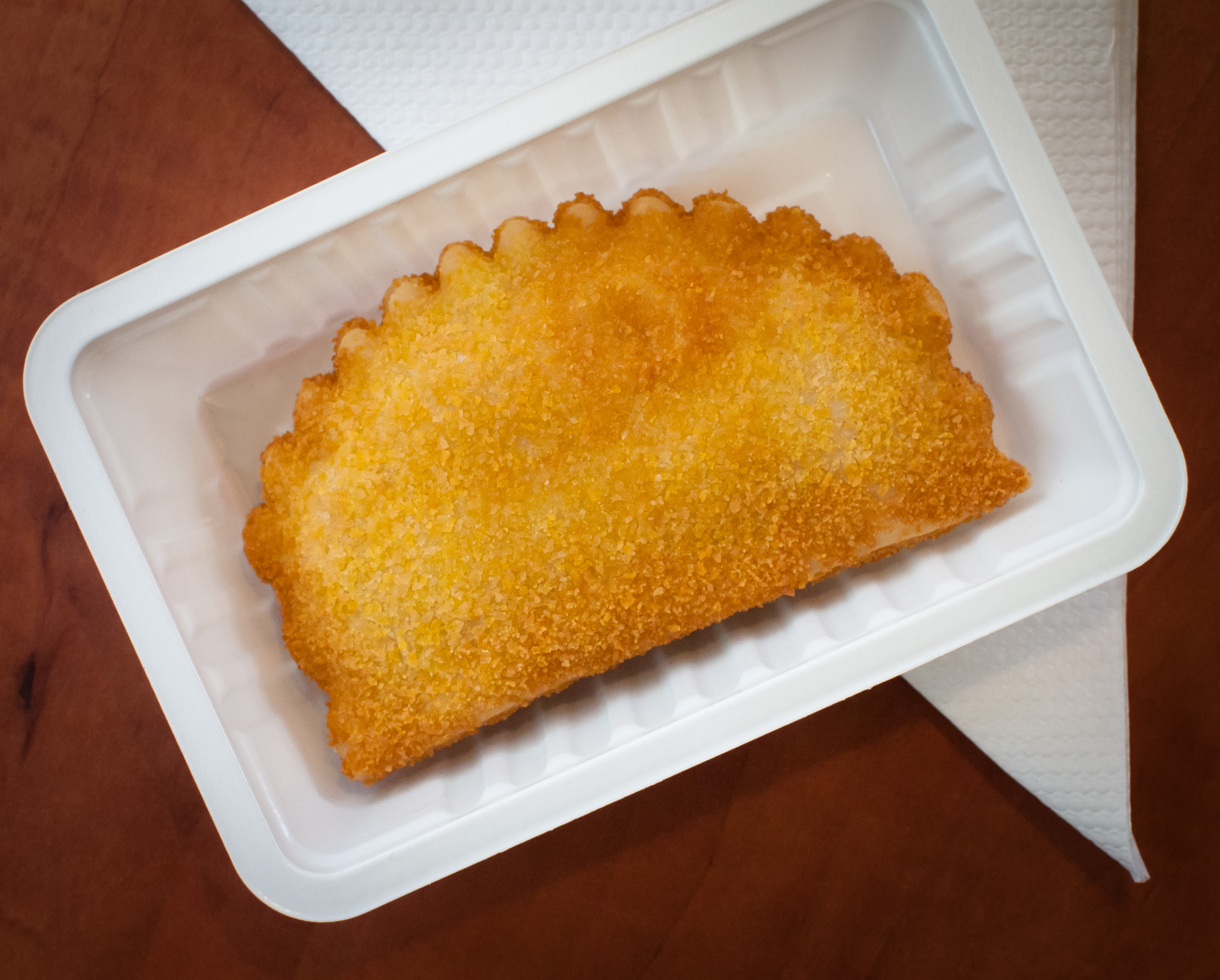
Half-moon shaped kaassoufflé

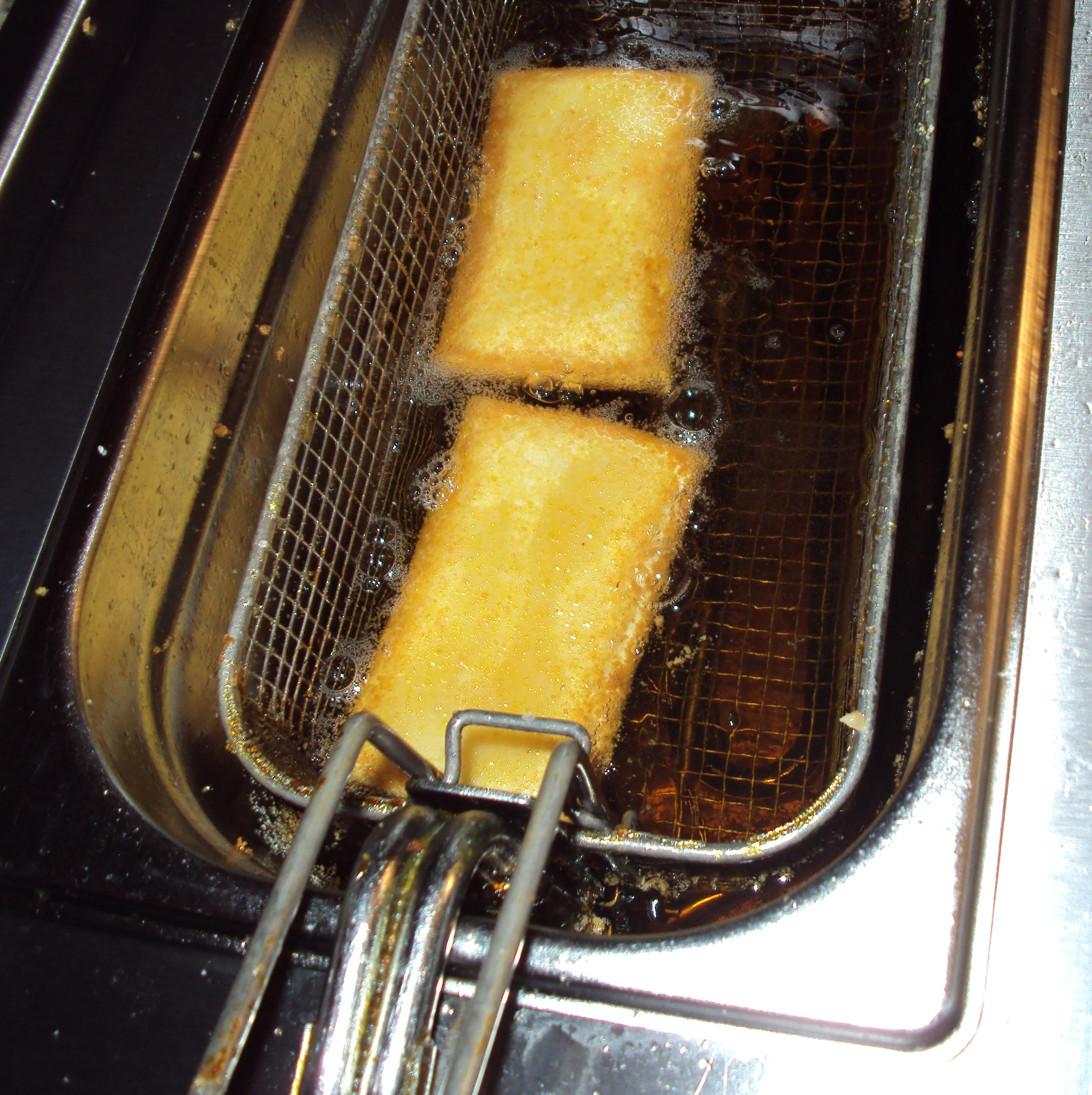
Deep-frying kaassoufflés
