= Automat =

Type of fast food restaurant

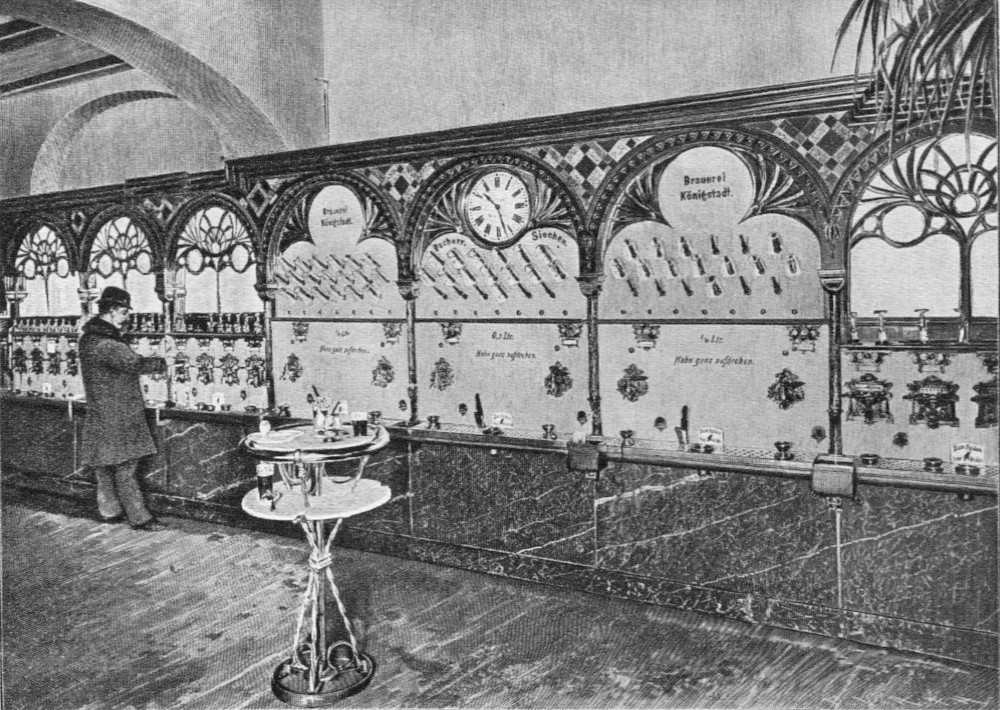
The first automat at 13 Leipziger Straße in Berlin, Germany

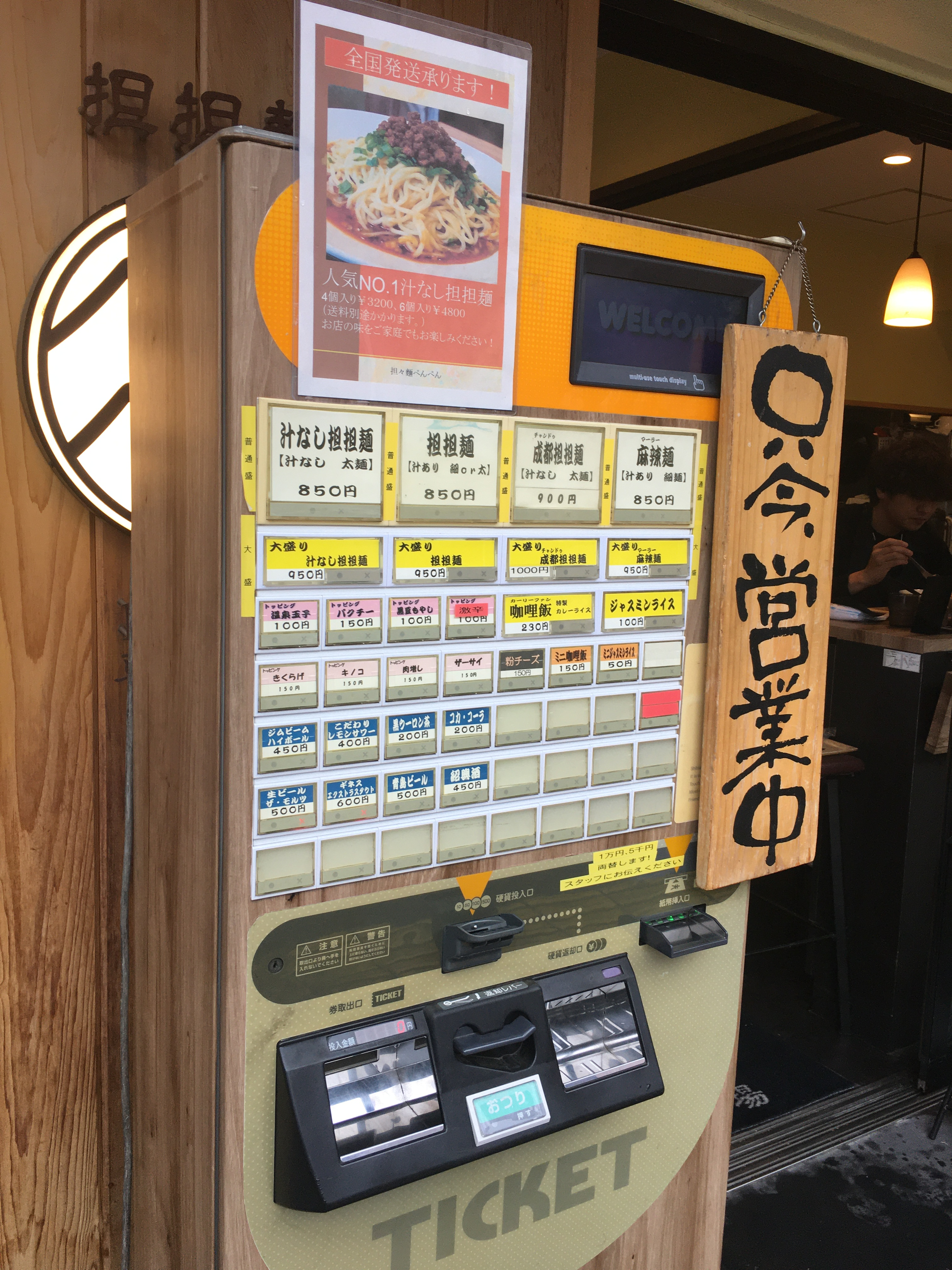
A food ticket machine in Japan in 2022

An automat is a fast-food restaurant where food and drink are served through a vending machine, typically without waitstaff. The world's first automat, Quisisana, opened in Berlin, Germany, in 1895.

== By country ==
=== Germany ===
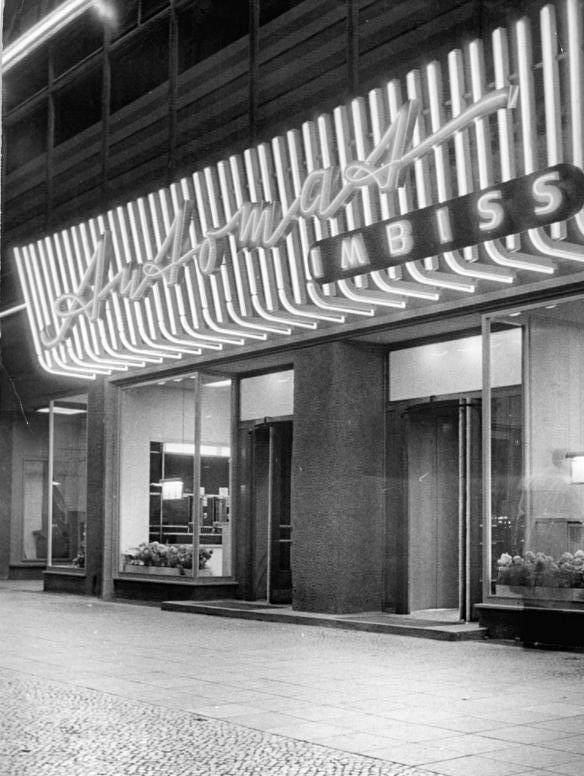
An automat in East Berlin, 1954

The first documented automat was Quisisana, which opened in 1895 in Berlin, Germany. In 1904, a similar restaurant opened in what was then Breslau, German Silesia (the city is now Wrocław, Polish Silesia).

=== Japan ===
In Japan, in addition to vending machines that sell prepared food, many restaurants also use food ticket machines (Japanese: 食券機, romanized: shokkenki). This process involves purchasing a meal ticket from a vending machine, which is then presented to a server who prepares and serves the meal.

Kaitenzushi restaurants, which serve sushi on conveyor belts, are also common in Japan.

=== Netherlands ===
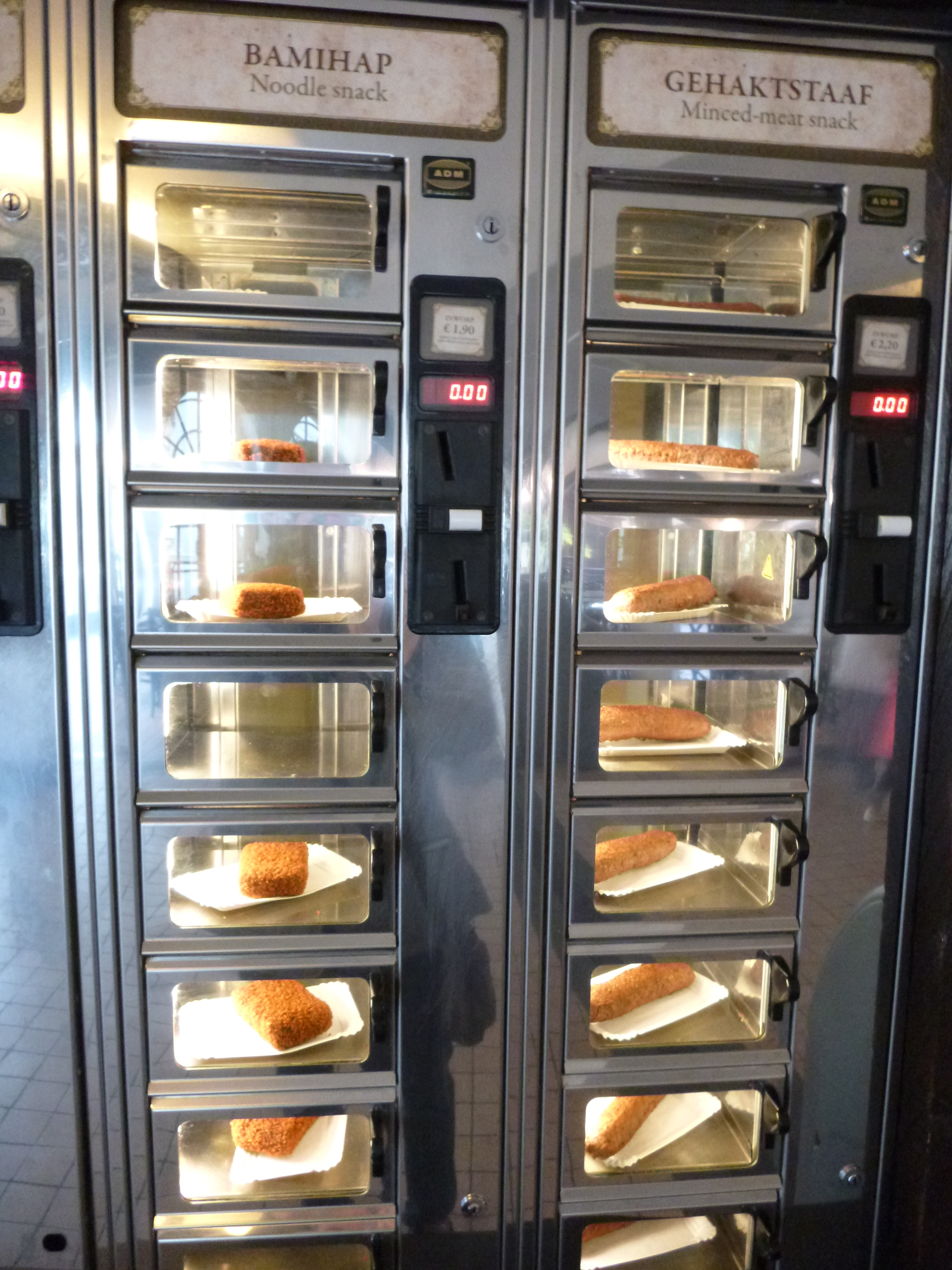
An automat in Efteling

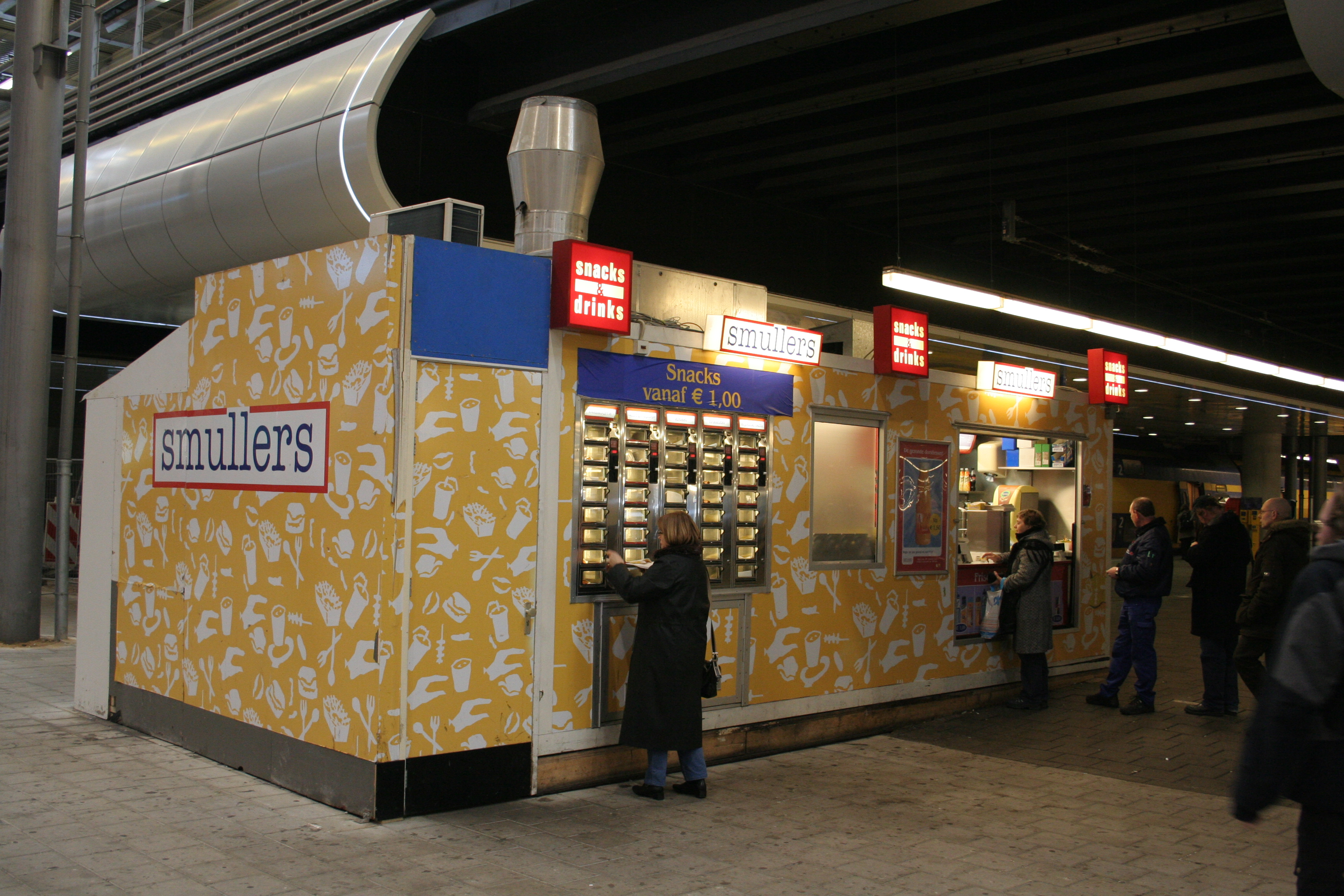
A Smullers automat/snack bar at Den Haag Centraal railway station

Automats (Dutch: automatiek) provide a variety of typical Dutch fried fast food, such as frikandellen and croquettes, as well as hamburgers and sandwiches from vending machines which are back-loaded from a kitchen.

FEBO is the best-known chain of Dutch automats, with some outlets open 24 hours a day.

=== United States ===
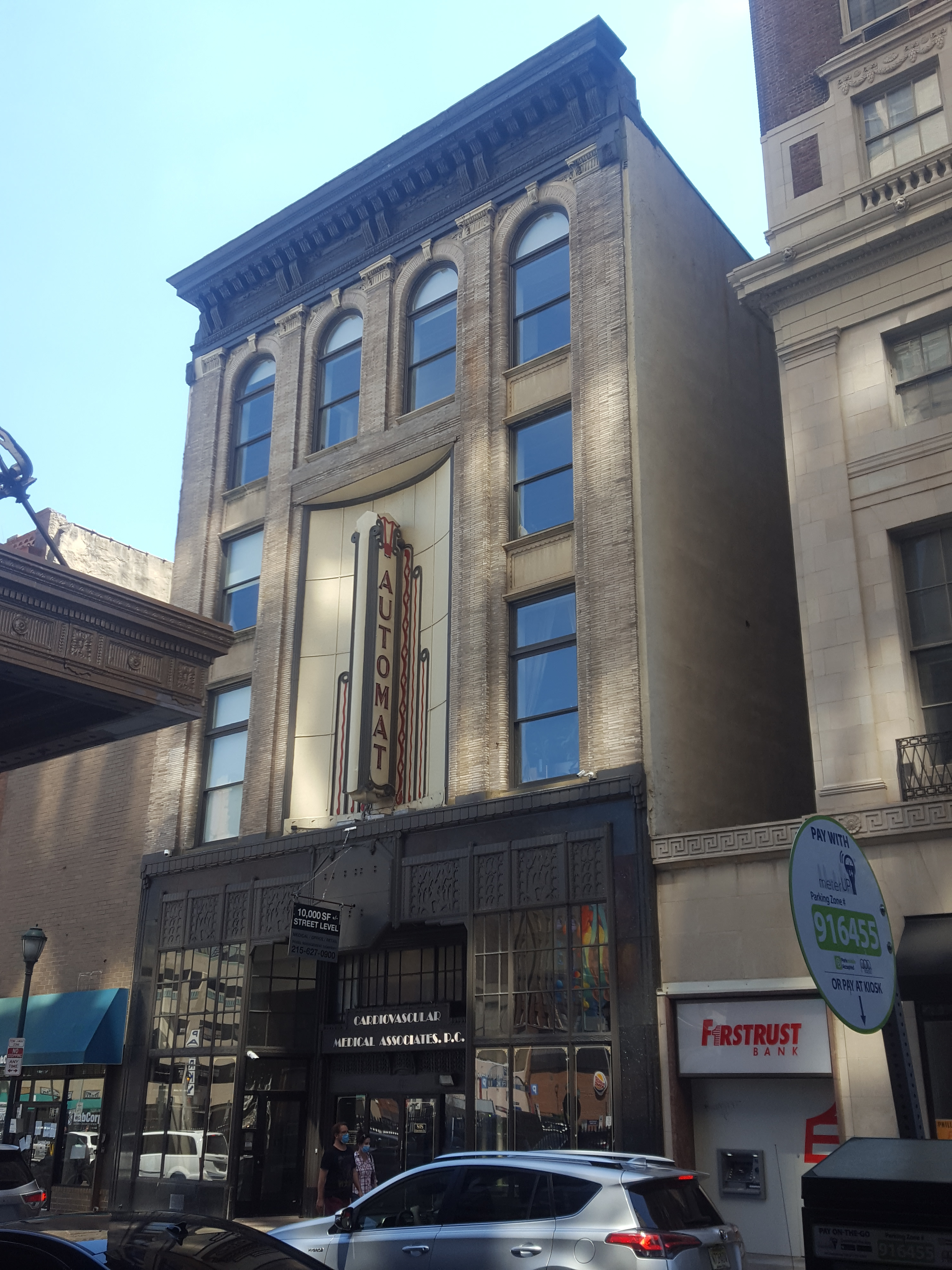
818 Chestnut St, Philadelphia, the site of the first U.S. Horn & Hardart Automat, pictured with original automat signage in July 2020.

The first automat in the United States was opened by food services company Horn & Hardart on June 12, 1902, at 818 Chestnut St. in Philadelphia, Pennsylvania. Inspired by Max Sielaff's automat restaurants in Berlin, they were among the first forty-seven restaurants (and the first outside of Europe) to receive patented vending machines from Sielaff's Berlin factory. The automat expanded to New York City in 1912, and gradually became part of popular culture in northern industrial cities.

Originally, the machines in US automats only accepted nickels. A cashier sat in a change booth in the center of the restaurant behind a wide marble counter with five to eight rounded depressions. The diner would insert the required number of coins in a machine and then lift a window, hinged at the top, and remove the meal, which was usually wrapped in waxed paper. The kitchen was located behind the machines to replenish food from the rear.

Automats were popular with a wide variety of celebrity patrons, including Walter Winchell and Irving Berlin. The New York automats were also popular with unemployed songwriters and actors. Playwright Neil Simon called automats "the Maxim's of the disenfranchised" in 1987.

The automat was threatened by the arrival of fast food restaurants, which served food over the counter with more payment flexibility than traditional automats. By the 1970s, the automats' remaining appeal in their core urban markets was chiefly nostalgic. Another contributing factor to their demise was inflation, which increased food prices and made the use of coins inconvenient at a time before bill acceptors were common on vending equipment.

At one time, there were forty Horn & Hardart automats in New York City. The last one closed in 1991, when the company had converted most of its New York City locations into Burger King restaurants. At the time, customers had been noticing a decline in the quality of the food.

=== 2000s US revivals ===
In an attempt to revive automats, a company called Bamn! opened a Dutch-style automat store in the East Village in New York City in 2006, only to close three years later. In 2015, another attempt to open an automat was made by a San Francisco company called Eatsa, which opened six automated restaurants in California, New York, and the District of Columbia, but they all closed by 2019. The company soon rebranded itself as Brightloom, and continue to sell automation technology to restaurants.

The COVID-19 pandemic inspired a new wave of automat revival attempts, aimed to adapt to the social distancing guidelines and the desire for contactless dining. Joe Scutellaro and Bob Baydale opened Automat Kitchen, which specialized in fresh food, in Jersey City's Newport Centre in early 2021; Another automat chain, the Brooklyn Dumpling Shop, opened in the East Village in 2021; they opened a chain in Philadelphia, Pennsylvania, in December 2023.

== Rail transport ==
A form of the automat was used on some passenger trains. The Great Western Railway in the United Kingdom announced plans in December 1945 to introduce an automat on buffet cars. Plans were delayed by impending nationalisation, but an automat was finally introduced on the Cambrian Coast Express in 1962.

In the United States, the Pennsylvania Railroad introduced an automat between New York Penn Station and Washington Union Station in 1954. Southern Pacific Railroad introduced automat buffet cars on the Coast Daylight and Sunset Limited in 1962. Amtrak converted four buffet cars to automats in 1985 for use on the Auto Train.

In Switzerland, the Bodensee–Toggenburg Bahn introduced automat buffet cars in 1987.

With the advent of air travel and other forms of transportation, automats on trains became less popular and were eventually phased out. The last automat on a train in the United States was on the short-lived Lake Country Limited in 2001.

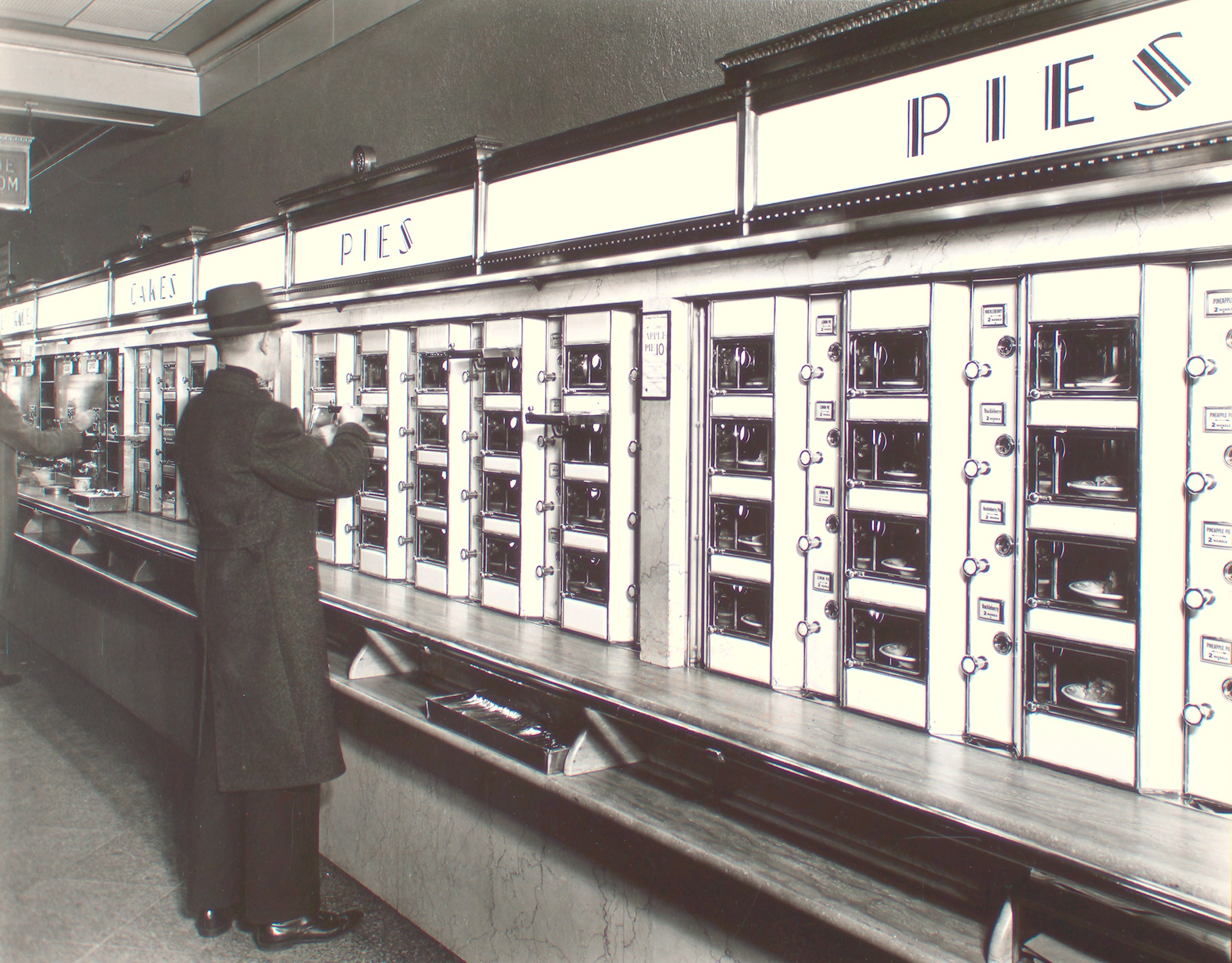
An automat in Manhattan, New York City in 1936

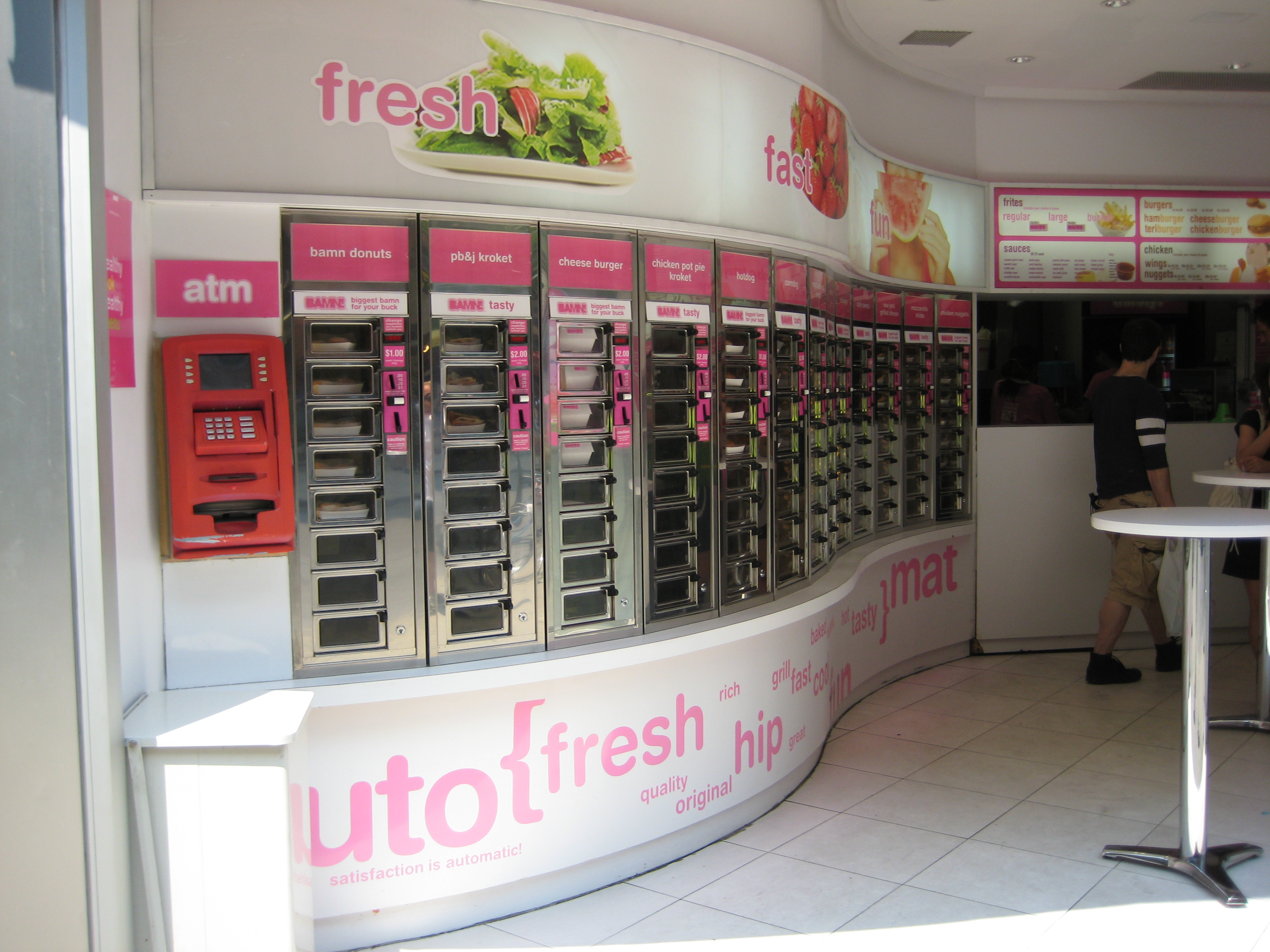
An automat in Manhattan's East Village, c. 2007

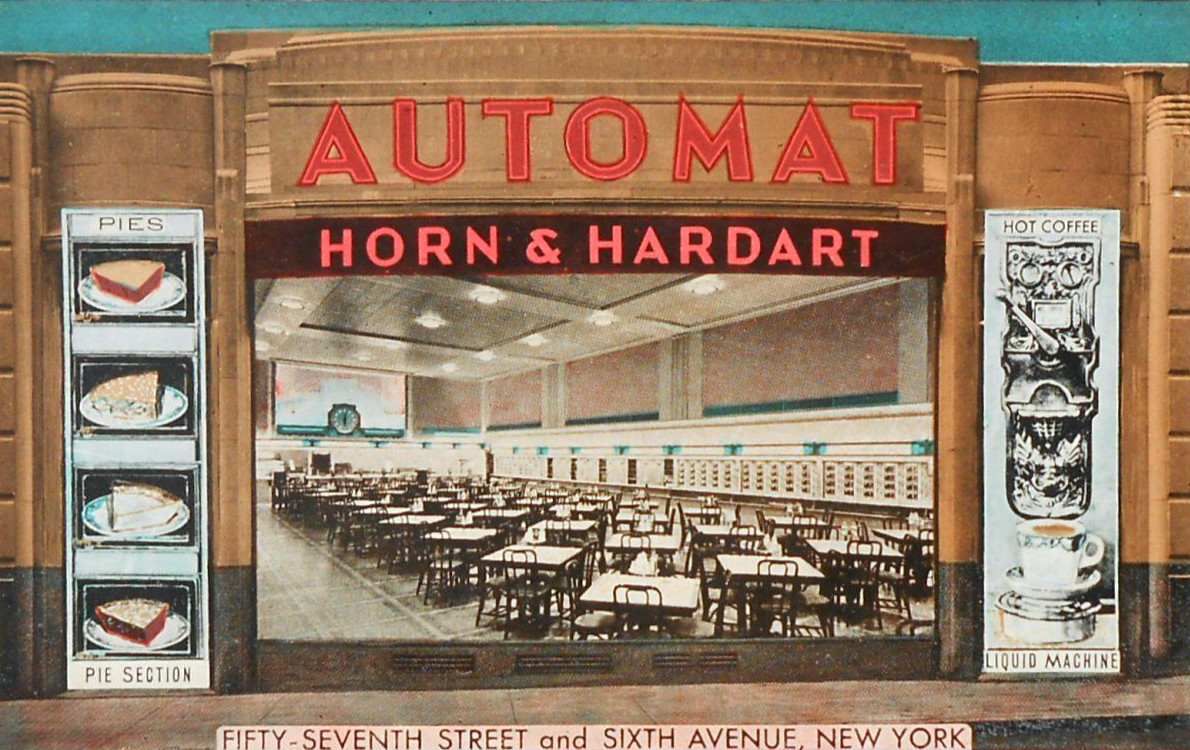
An automat at 1165 Sixth Avenue, New York City, in the 1930s.

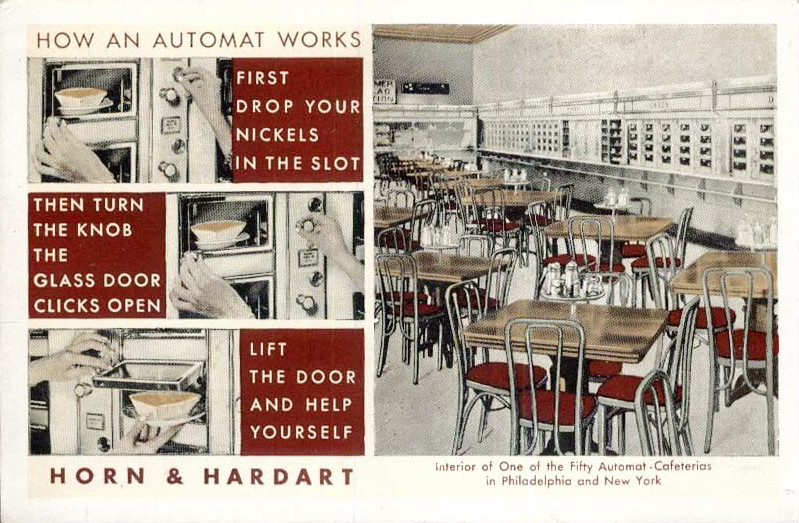
A Horn & Hardart postcard explaining how food was served in an automat, c. 1930s

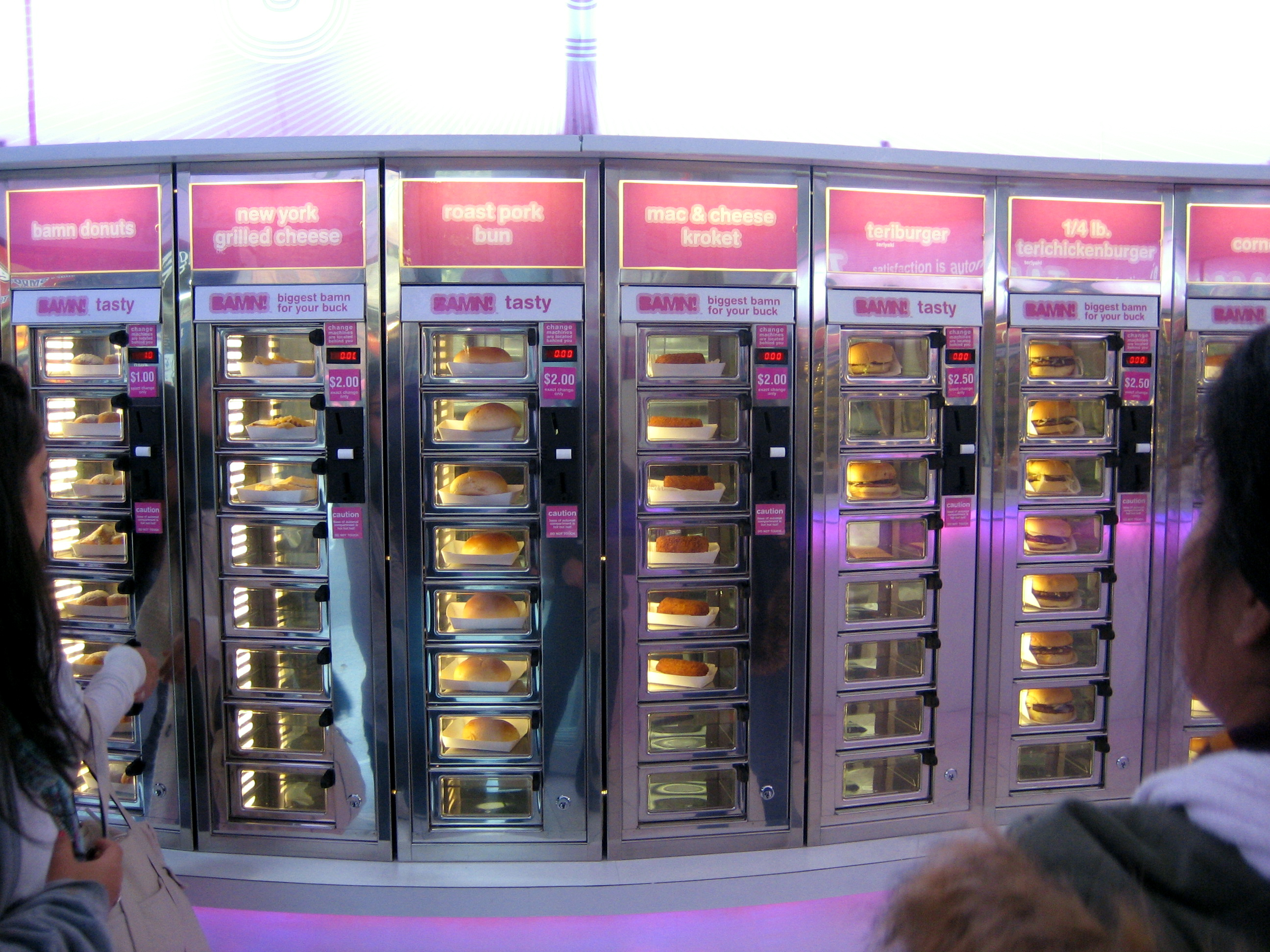
A Bamn! automat, 2006

== See also ==
- Automated convenience store
- Automated restaurant
- Automated retail
- Cafeteria
- Conveyor belt sushi
- Full-line vending
- Virtual restaurant
- The Automat – 2021 American documentary by Lisa Hurwitz
