= FEBO =

Dutch fast food chain

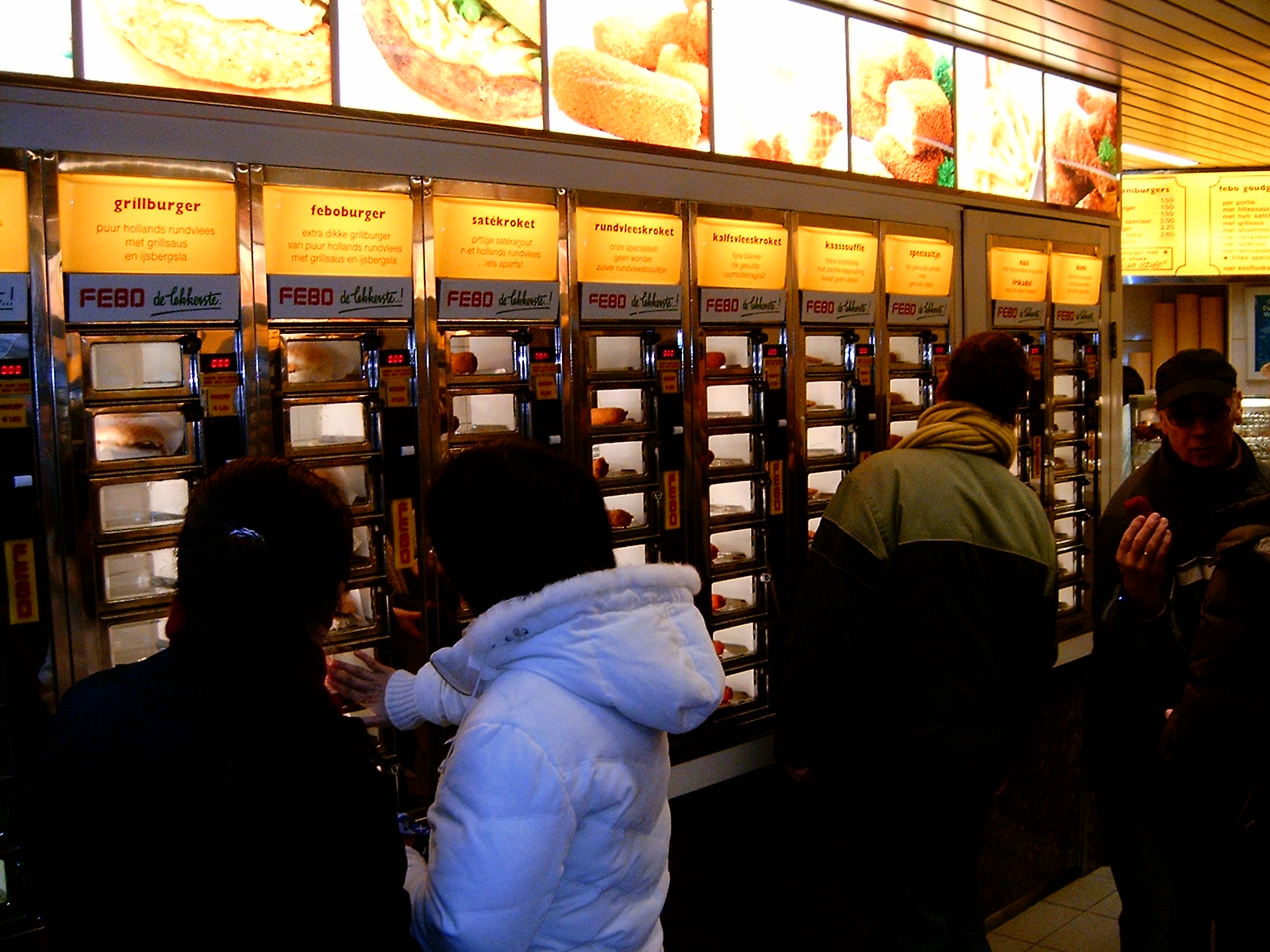
FEBO on the Nieuwendijk in Amsterdam, Netherlands.

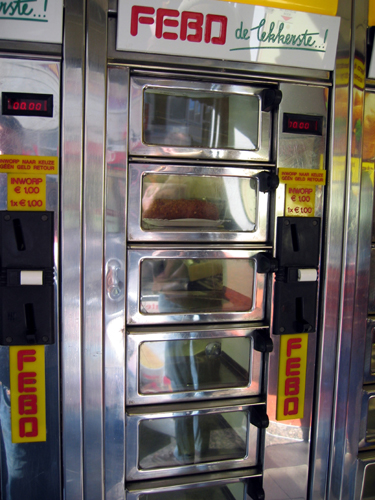
The 'automatiek' is a typical Dutch vending machine.

FEBO (Dutch pronunciation: [ˈfeːboː]) is a chain of Dutch walk-up fast food restaurants of the automat type. Founded in 1941 in Amsterdam, Netherlands, FEBO is most notable for this automatic format: a counter is available for purchasing French fries, beverages, and hamburgers. Other FEBO snacks can be bought from the automats. The primary automat-vended items are krokets, frikandellen, hamburgers, kaassoufflés and similar items.

According to the company, FEBO has almost 60 shops around the Netherlands, with 54 being franchises. There are 22 shops in Amsterdam alone.

== History ==
FEBO was opened as Maison FEBO by Johan de Borst (1919–2008), named after Ferdinand Bolstraat, and by 1960 it had grown into an automat restaurant, where homemade krokets and frikandellen were sold. When the bakery moved to Amstelveenseweg, the name FEBO was kept. From here, new branches were opened both in Amsterdam and further afield, such as Purmerend, Hoorn and Hoofddorp.

Johan de Borst's son Hans took over the company in 1990, later followed by his grandson Dennis. The founder died in May 2008.

A new production centre was opened in Amsterdam-Noord, near the Coen Tunnel, where the snacks are produced and brought to stores immediately after production.

== See also ==
- Dutch cuisine
- Quisisana
- List of hamburger restaurants
