= Quisisana =

German food-service company

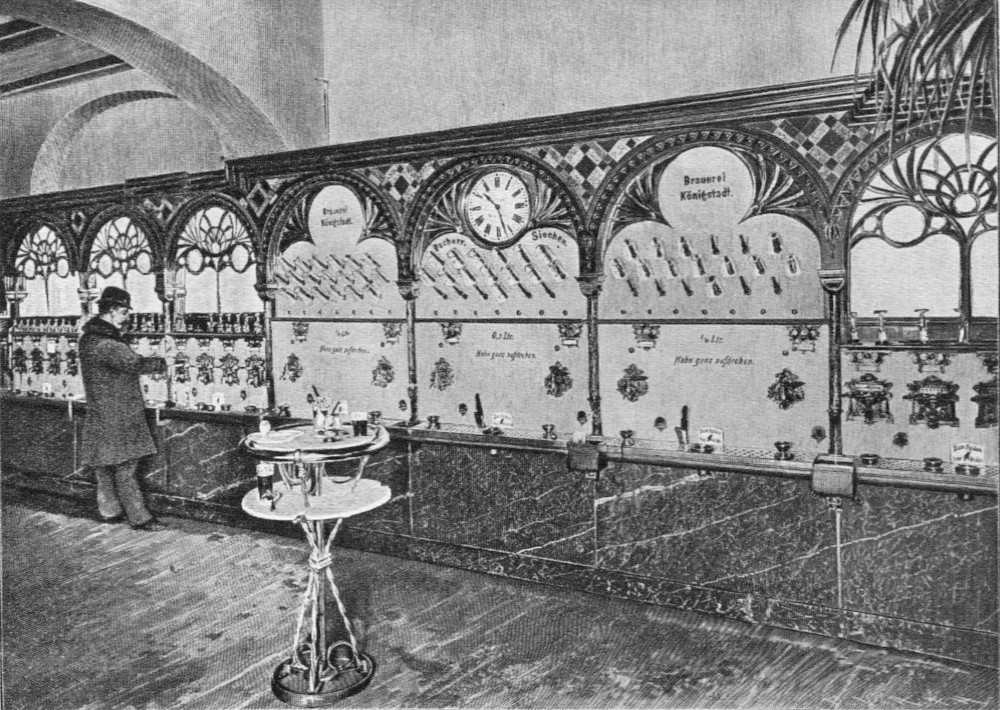
The world's first automat "Quisisana" at 13 Leipziger Straße in Berlin Germany. Illustration from 1897.

Quisisana was a German company that introduced the world's first automat restaurant in June 1895 on the grounds of the Berlin Zoological Garden, Germany. The establishment was considered a success, selling 5,400 sandwiches, 9,000 glasses of wine and cordials, and 22,000 cups of coffee on the first Sunday of business. Quisisana also manufactured automat machines and equipment, including a milk vending machine which was adapted for use in German schools.

The name Quisisana comes from the Italian phrase qui si sana [ˈkwi ssi ˈsaːna] which roughly translates to "here one is healed" or "here you become healthy". Automat is a loanword from German for automaton which was adopted from Latin automatus, originally borrowed from the Greek autómatos (αὐτόματος), meaning "acting of itself".

== History and American expansion ==
After the introduction of the first automat in Berlin in 1895 and a demonstration of the technology at the Brussels World Fair in 1897, the concept soon expanded into other European cities such as Vienna in 1898 and Saint Petersburg in 1900 (Kvisisana), whilst its developers also purveyed their methods in the United States. Joseph Horn and Frank Hardart, owners of the first automat in the United States, were inspired by the Quisisana automat restaurant after Hardart, of Bavarian heritage himself, visited one in 1900. Hardart then supposedly convinced Horn to place an order for automat equipment from the Quisisana company itself in order to expand their existing restaurant services. However, some sources instead state that they purchased their vending machines in 1901 from a person of the name Max Sielaff, a salesman looking to sell vending machines designed by a German engineer from Automat GmbH. Sielaff had supposedly been convincing the partners to purchase automat equipment since 1898 and believed that America would be receptive to this new technology.

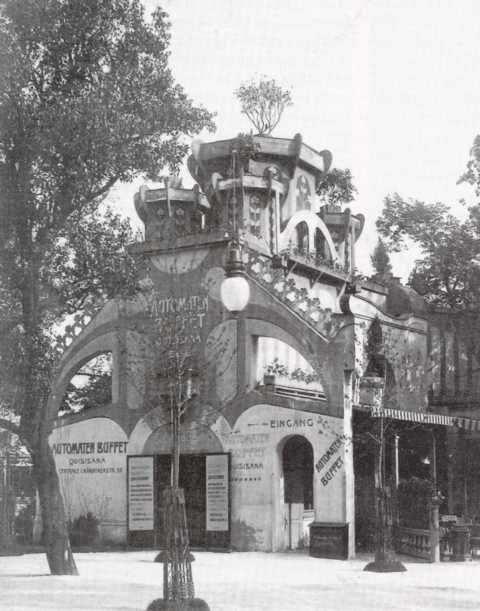
Quisisana, No. 57 Kärntnerstraße, Vienna

It took two years for Quisisana's equipment to arrive in Philadelphia for Horn and Hardart's first automat restaurant; the steamship transporting the first machine sank. Their insurance company covered the bill and they received their automat equipment in 1902 — the same year they opened their automat under the name Horn & Hardart at No. 818 Chestnut Street. Horn and Hardart ordered more of the German equipment in 1905, '07, and '12, each time having it refined by their chief engineer John Fritsche, before eventually devising their own automat machines.

== Payment methods ==
In the United States, customers paid for the meals by exchanging larger sums of money for change at a register without a number display, supposedly keeping diners' spending habits discreet. In Austria, a system of tokens existed for the restaurant on Kärntner Straße (potentially alongside cash as well) with the inscription "Automaten Buffet, Quisisana" on the front face and "Centrale Wien-I, Kärtnerstr. 57" on the back face, referring to No. 57, Kärtnerstraße, District 1, Vienna.

There also exist tokens displaying an unknown illustration on the back face instead of writing, possibly suggesting these were used by different Quisisana automats. The original automat in Berlin supposedly exclusively used tokens as well. It still remains unknown whether this token system applied to other establishments in Europe, or whether it was reserved for the automat buffets located in Germany and Austria.

== See also ==
- Automated retail
- FEBO
- Full-line vending
