= Brightloom =

American company

- Formerly: eatsa
- Type: Private
- Industry: Computer software
- Founded: August 31, 2015; 11 years ago
- Founders: Scott Drummond; Tim Young
- Headquarters: San Francisco, California
- Key people: Adam Brotman (CEO)
- Website: brightloom.com

Brightloom (formerly eatsa) is an American company based in San Francisco that provides automation technology to restaurants. Both Eatsa and Brightloom are trade names used by Keenwawa, Inc., a Delaware corporation, which is the true legal name of this company.

On July 22, 2019, the company rebranded as Brightloom and closed a $30 million funding round. It was also announced that Brightloom would integrate with Starbucks' mobile app and customer loyalty platform.

== Products ==
Brightloom sells restaurants a platform which includes software for ordering kiosks, a mobile app, digital signage, and the aggregation of orders from delivery apps for kitchen staff. For pickup, the company offers cubby hardware and shelves with integrated displays. In the fall of 2019, Brightloom has announced an advanced customer analytics platform and customer loyalty features for restaurant operators.

== History ==
=== Eatsa restaurants ===
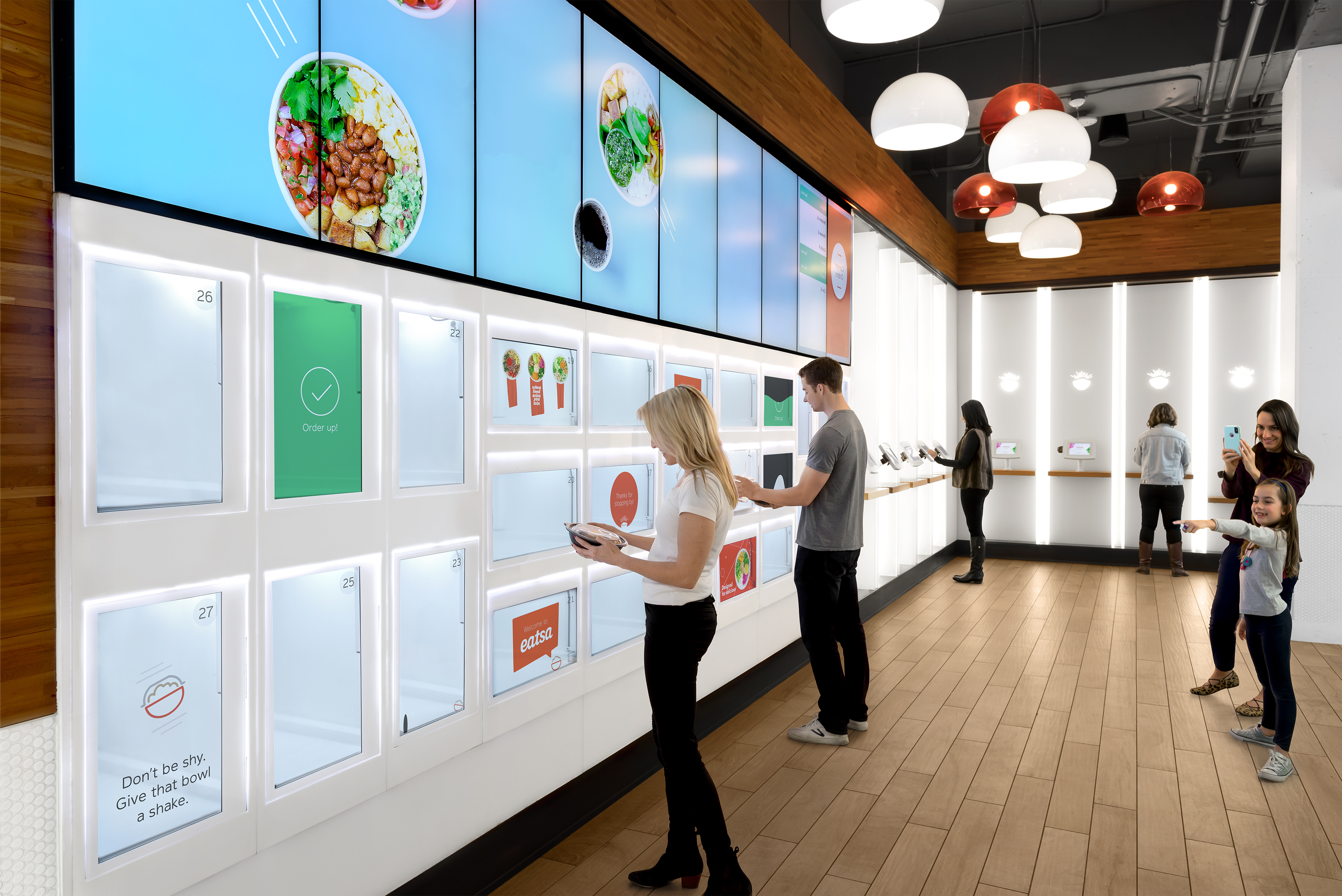
Digital cubbies at a former eatsa restaurant in San Francisco

Eatsa opened its first restaurant in 2015 with a menu focused around vegetarian quinoa bowls. By the end of 2016, the company had six locations in two states and the District of Columbia. Customers would place orders via iPad kiosks or a mobile app, then pick up their food from a self-serve wall of digital cubbies, without the need to interact with an employee of the company. In October 2017, eatsa closed its locations in NYC and Washington, DC, leaving only two locations in San Francisco, and announced that eatsa technology would begin to appear as an end-to-end platform in other restaurants. By February 2019, Eatsa had closed all of its restaurants and announced plans to reopen one location in San Francisco later that year.

Both Eatsa and Brightloom are trade names used by Keenwawa, Inc., a Delaware corporation, which is the true legal name of this company.

=== Technology platform ===
In December 2017, Wow Bao, a fast-casual restaurant concept in Chicago, opened a new store using the Brightloom platform as the foundation for a new, automated restaurant experience and shared plans to roll out additional Brightloom-enabled locations throughout 2018.
