= Výtopna =

Czech restaurant chain

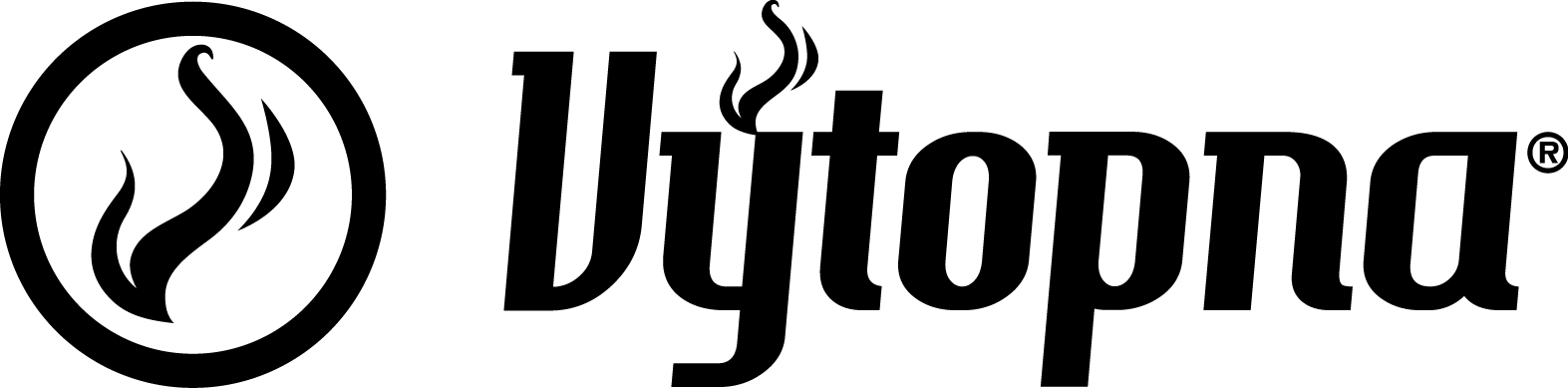

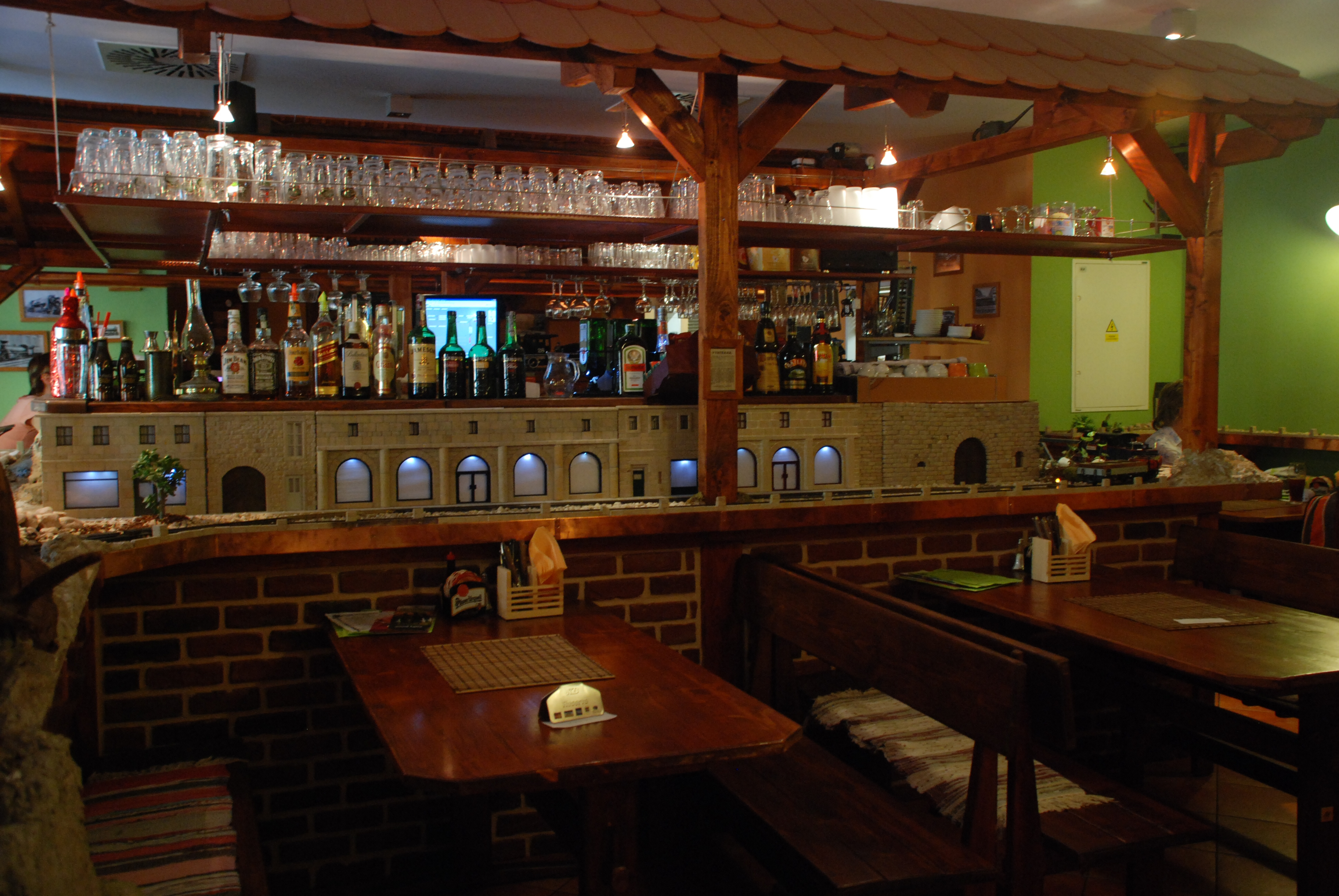
- The interior design of Výtopna's location in Brno
- Company type: Restaurant franchise
- Industry: Restaurant chain
- Founded: Brno, 2009
- Headquarters: Czech Republic
- Number of locations: 2
- Website: www.vytopna.cz

Výtopna is a Czech restaurant chain, also with an outlet in Austria, in which model trainsets bring beverages and food to every customer table. The chain has one restaurant each in Prague and Vienna. The trademark is owned by Petr Fridrich.

== History ==
The first restaurant with model train service was founded in Brno, Czech Republic in 2009. Prague's first location opened on Wenceslas Square in February 2010. The Brno location closed down on 27 August 2018. A second Prague location, within the Palladium shopping centre, closed in 2020 due to the effects of the COVID-19 pandemic in the Czech Republic.

== Locations ==
As of 2023, the chain has two outlets: one on Wenceslas Square in Prague and one by the Naschmarkt in Vienna.

== Principle ==
Customers are served by model trains that deliver beverages to them. Trains (locomotive plus open wagon or wagons) arrive bearing customers' orders, and customers unload their own drinks, and reload the used glasses. Trains are dispatched to the tables by staff. Individual trains are digitally controlled and they make realistic sounds of genuine trains.

== Model train technical specifications ==
- Size / design:scale 1:22,5 / G scale
- Locomotive size: 24–47 inch
- Top speed: 12,4 mph
- Durability: 310 000–434 000 model Miles
- Locomotive equipment: realistic sound, lights, two engines
Výtopna model trains

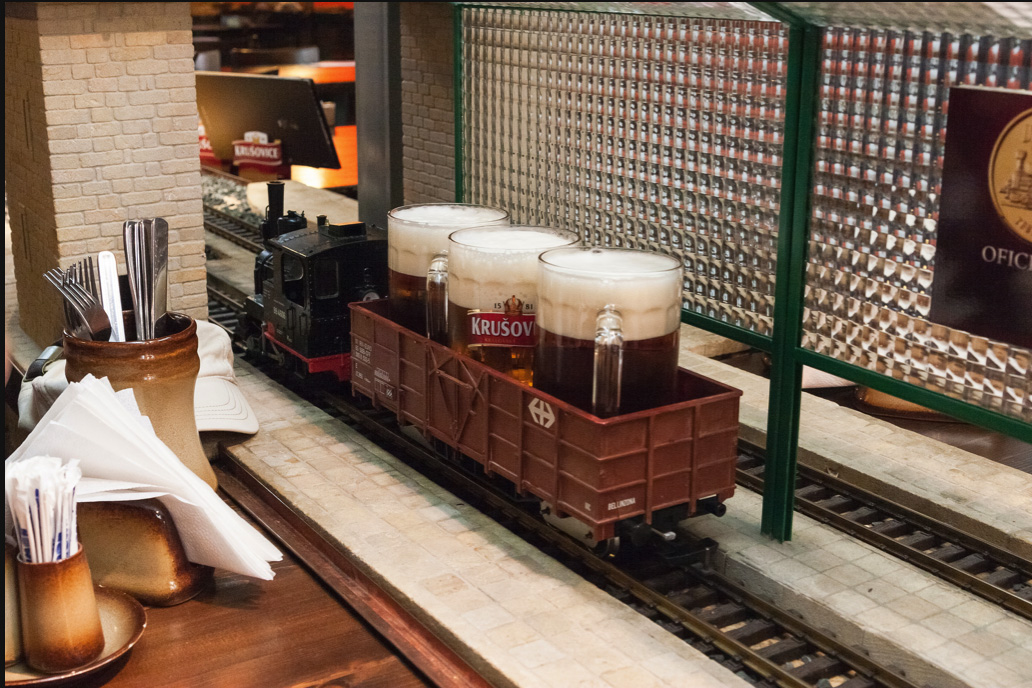
Trainset with beers

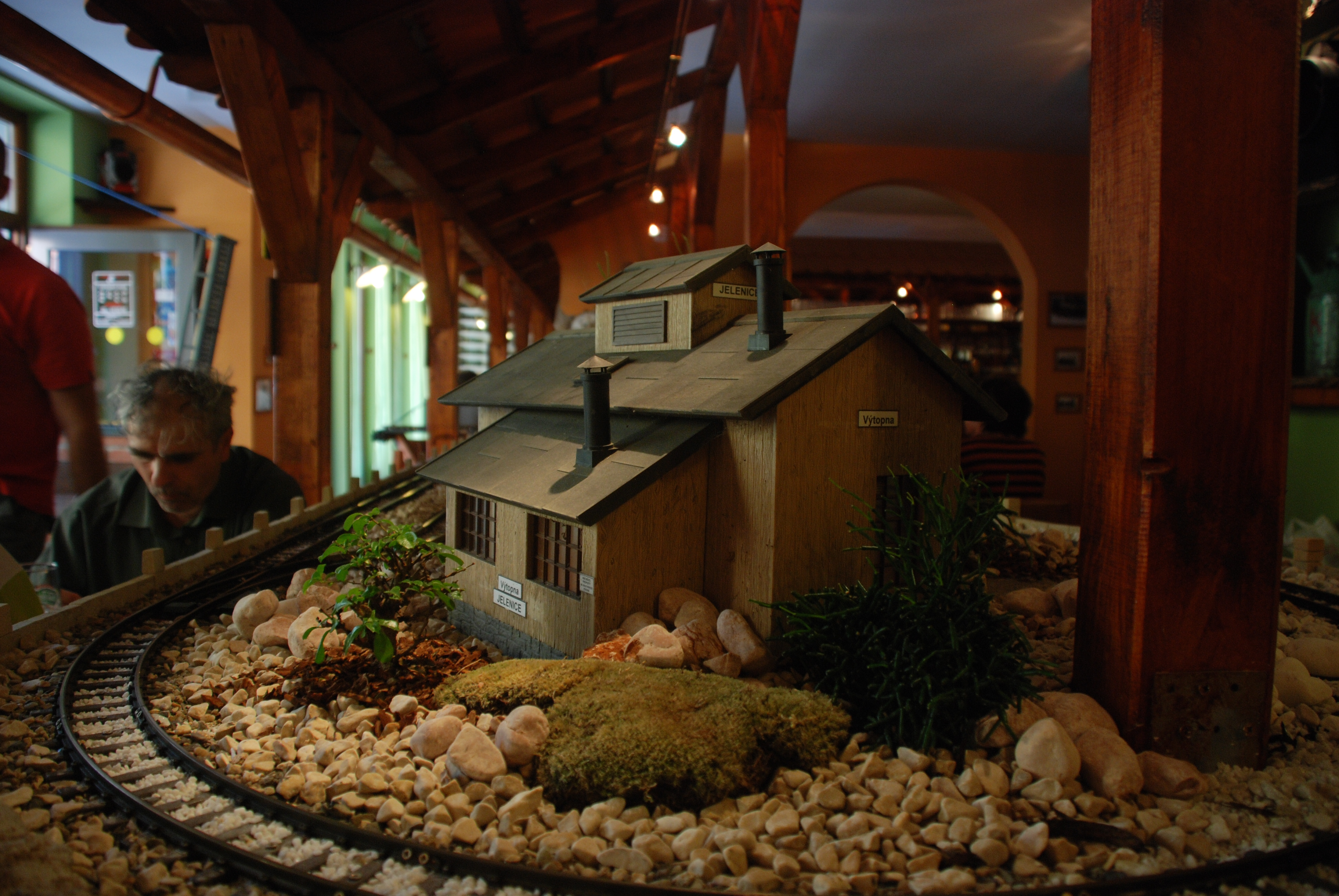
Detail of railroad decoration in restaurant

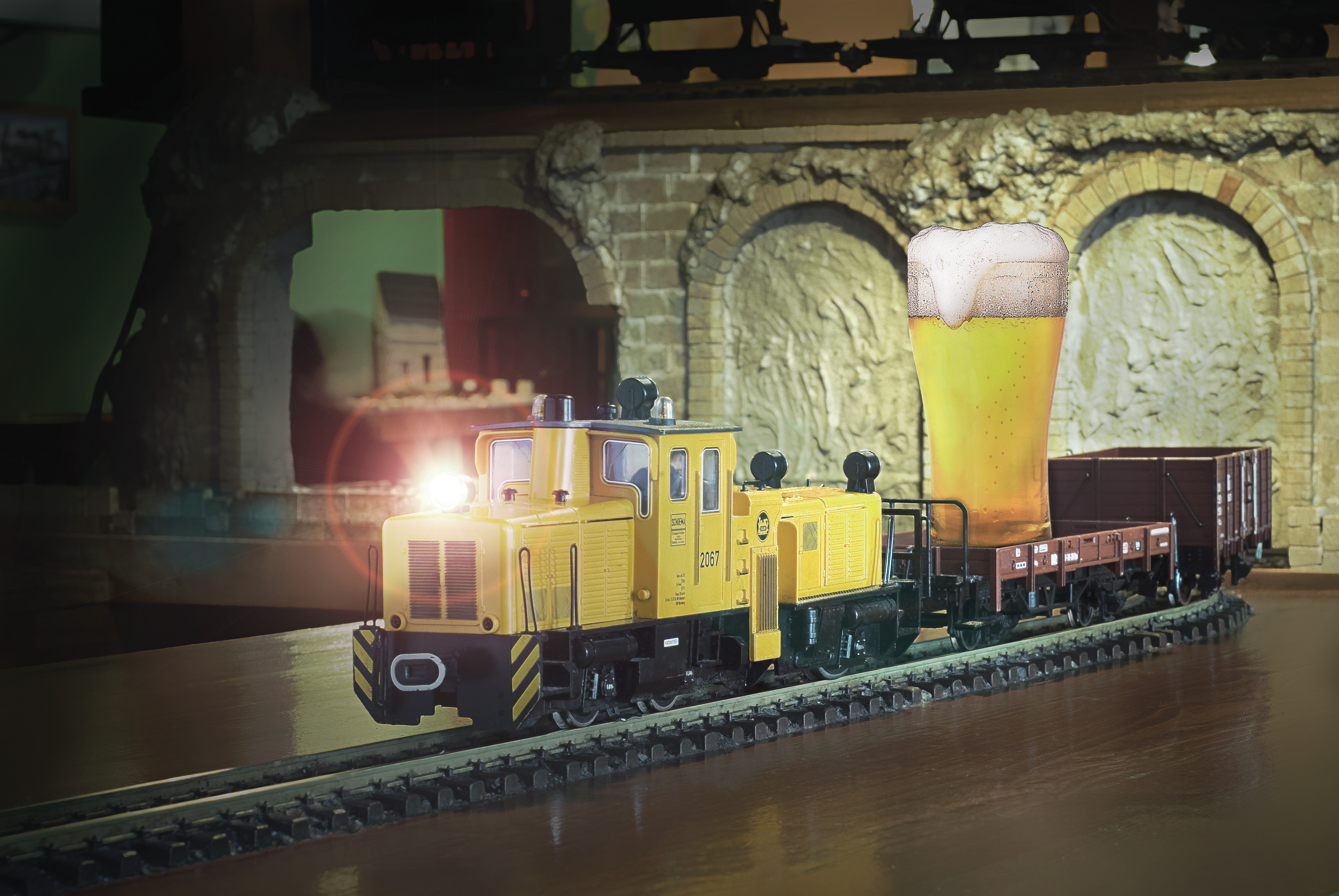
A model train in Výtopna, transporting a pint of beer to a customer

== See also ==
- Gastronomy
- Rail transport modelling
