= Gyūdon =

Japanese cuisine

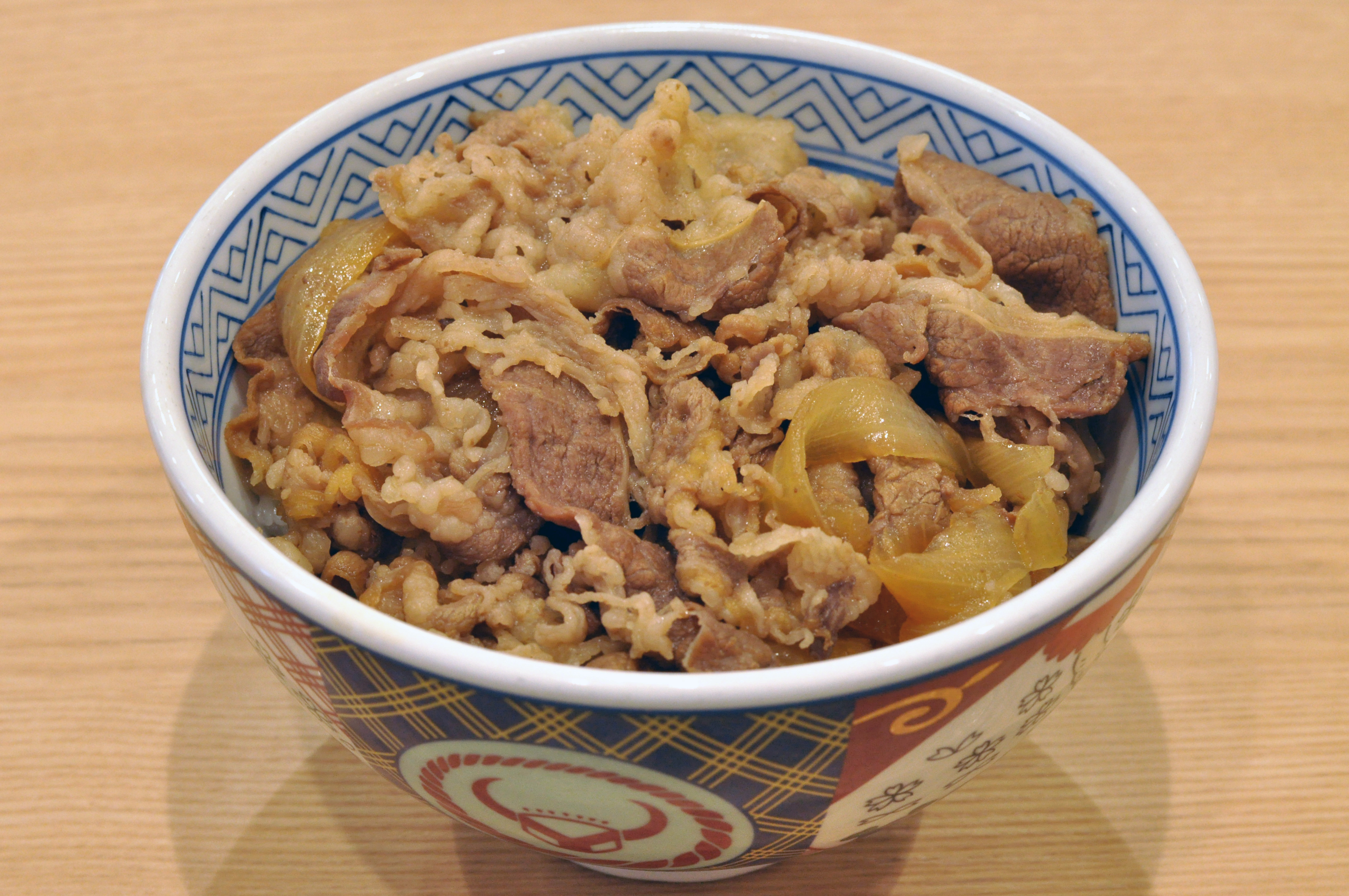
- Gyūdon from a Yoshinoya restaurant
- Alternative names: gyūmeshi ('beef [and] rice'), beef bowl
- Place of origin: Japan
- Main ingredients: rice, beef and onion

Gyūdon (牛丼; "beef bowl"), also known as gyūmeshi (牛飯 or 牛めし; "beef [and] rice"), is a Japanese dish consisting of a bowl of rice topped with beef and onion, simmered in a mildly sweet sauce flavored with dashi (fish and seaweed stock), soy sauce and mirin (sweet rice wine). It may sometimes also be served with toppings such as raw or soft poached eggs, negi onions, grated cheese or kimchi. A popular food in Japan, it is commonly eaten with beni shōga (pickled ginger), shichimi (ground chili pepper), and a side dish of miso soup.

== History ==
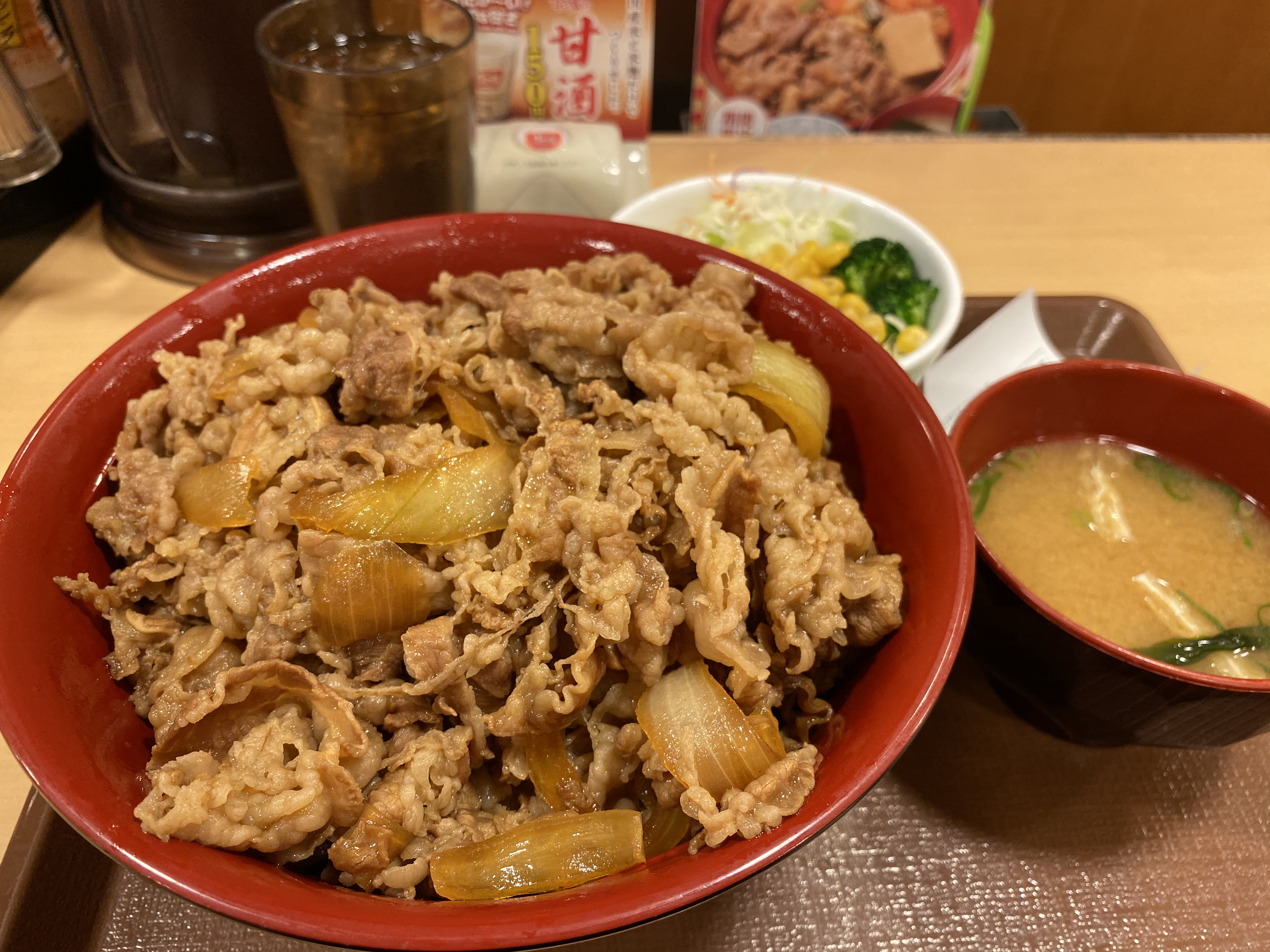
A typical gyūdon meal set, with miso soup

After the arrival of Buddhism in Japan in the 6th century, consumption of meat became rare in Japanese culture (especially those of four-footed animals such as cattle or pigs) and in many cases frowned upon, both for religious and practical reasons. It was only after the Meiji Restoration in 1868 and the subsequent westernization of the country that meat began to be widely eaten.

Gyūdon is generally considered to have originated from gyūnabe (牛鍋), a beef hot pot dish from the Kantō region of eastern Japan. Early gyūnabe consisted of beef simmered with Welsh onions (negi) in miso. Because the beef available in Japan at the time was often of poor quality, this method (originally used for venison) helped tenderize the meat and mask its strong odor. Beef was not yet consistently thinly sliced, and cubed meat was sometimes used. The negi was traditionally cut into pieces about 16-17 mm long, leading to the pieces themselves sometimes being called gobu (五分, "five bu"). By 1877, Tokyo had more than 550 gyūnabe restaurants.

As meat quality improved following the establishment of Western-style slaughterhouses and meat-processing facilities, Kantō-style gyūnabe increasingly used soy sauce- and sugar-based stock (割下, warishita) in place of miso. By around 1887, additional ingredients such as tofu and shirataki had also become common. This style developed into modern sukiyaki, while serving the beef and its sauce over rice in a deep bowl (donburi) gave rise to gyūmeshi and eventually gyūdon.

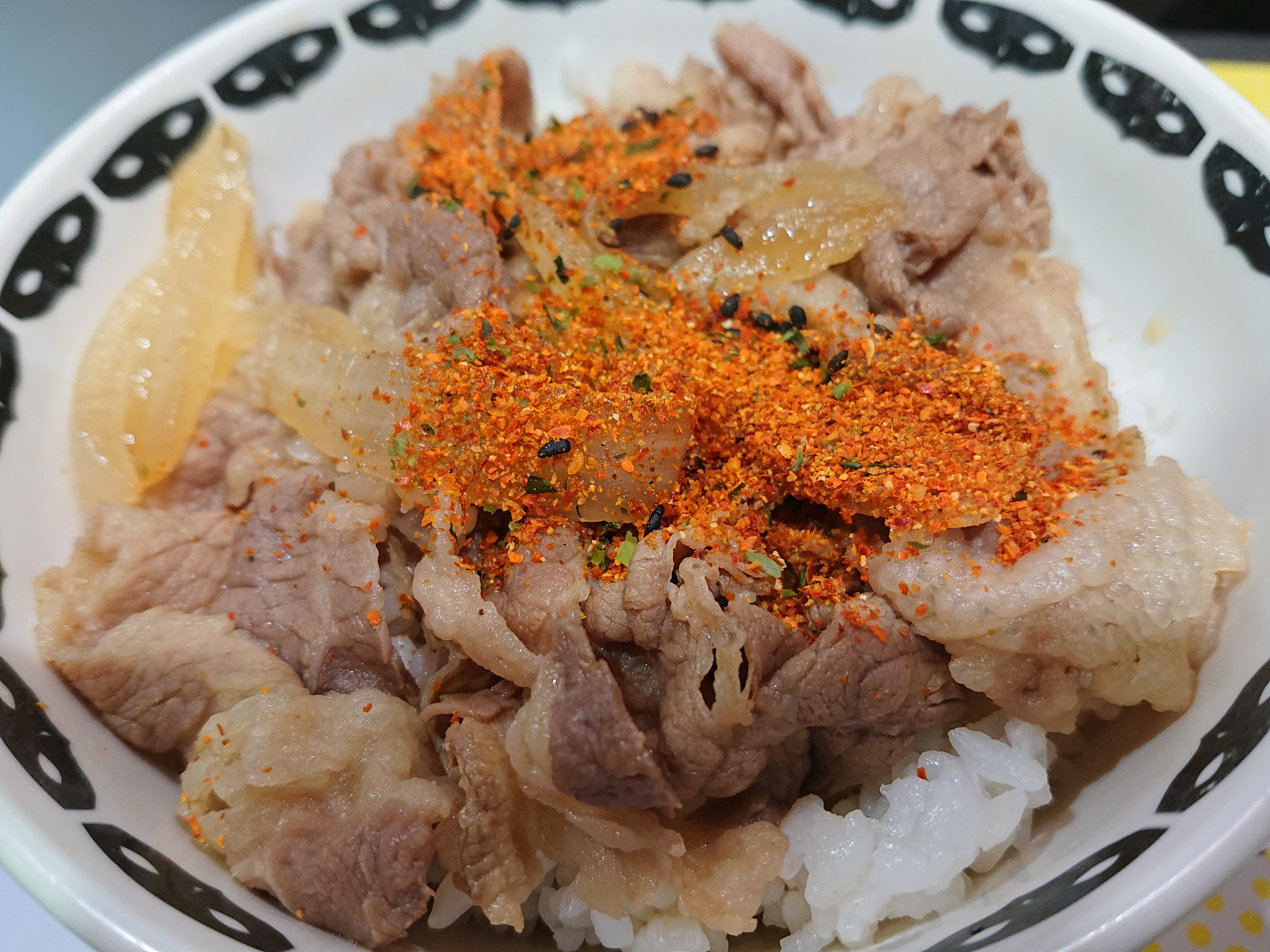
Gyūdon with shichimi, from a Sukiya restaurant

By the 1890s, gyūmeshi had already become popular in Tokyo, but was yet unknown in other places such as Kyoto or Osaka. In 1899, Eikichi Matsuda opened the first Yoshinoya restaurant at the fish market in Tokyo's Nihonbashi district, serving a dish known as gyūnabe-bukkake (牛鍋ぶっかけ, lit. "gyūnabe poured [over rice]"). Gyūdon, under the moniker kamechabu, were also being sold in food stands (yatai) in the streets of Ueno and Asakusa.

Initially regarded as food for the lower classes, gyūdon's social image changed dramatically following the Great Kantō Earthquake of 1923, when it was one of the food items readily available to residents of Tokyo. A Yomiuri Shimbun article dated December 10th of the same year, headlined "The Whole Nation Ate Gyūdon" (天下をあげて喰つた牛丼, Tenka o agete kutta gyūdon), reported on the dish's booming popularity. It was around this time that gyūdon evolved further into its present form: a bowl of rice topped with thin slices of beef with onions (tamanegi).

Although some establishments still offer gyūdon with a sukiyaki-like topping (i.e. containing ingredients such as shirataki or tofu), the dish as served in most major food chains nowadays simply consist of rice, beef and onions.

== As fast food ==
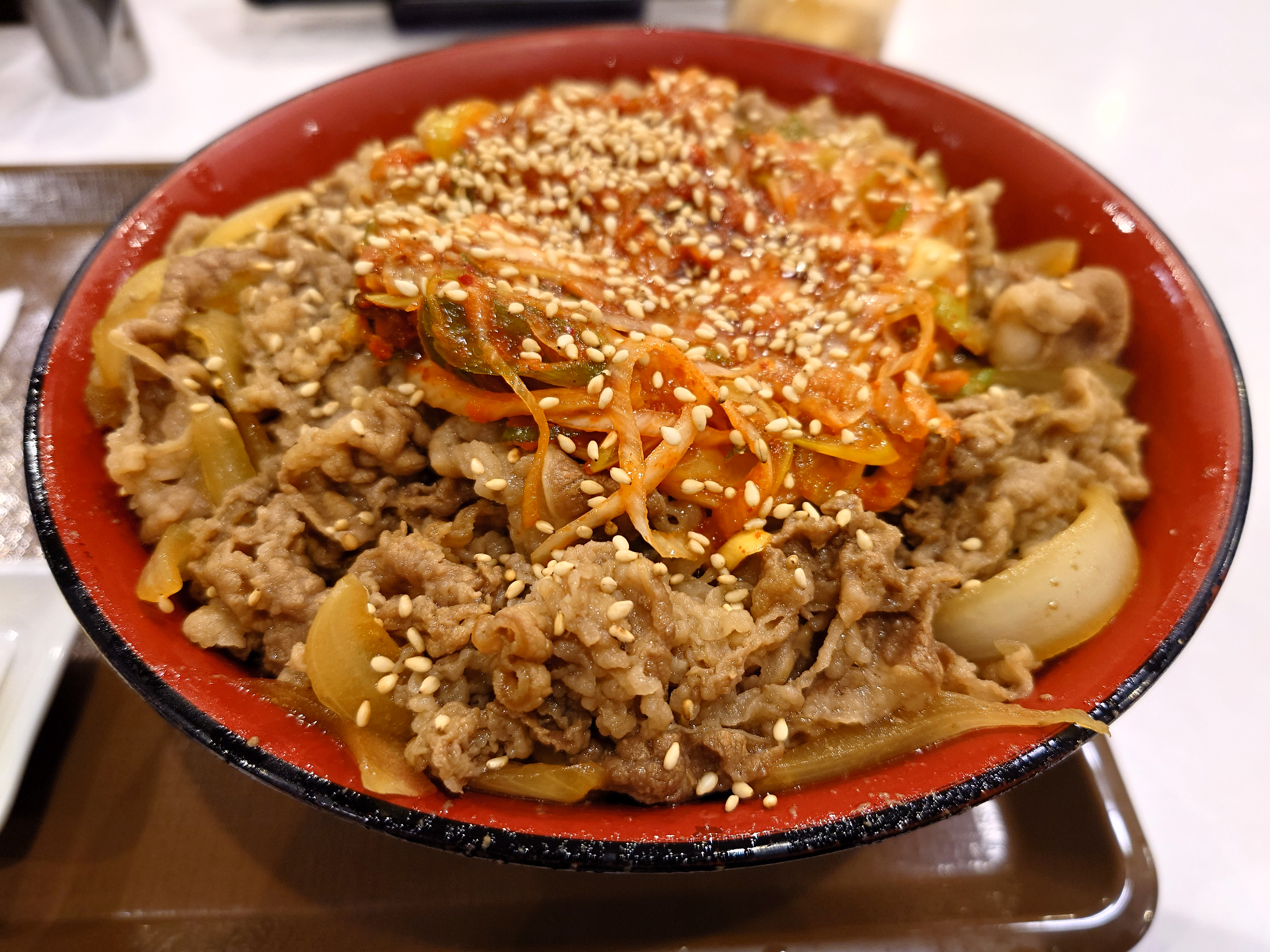
Bowl of gyūdon from Sukiya

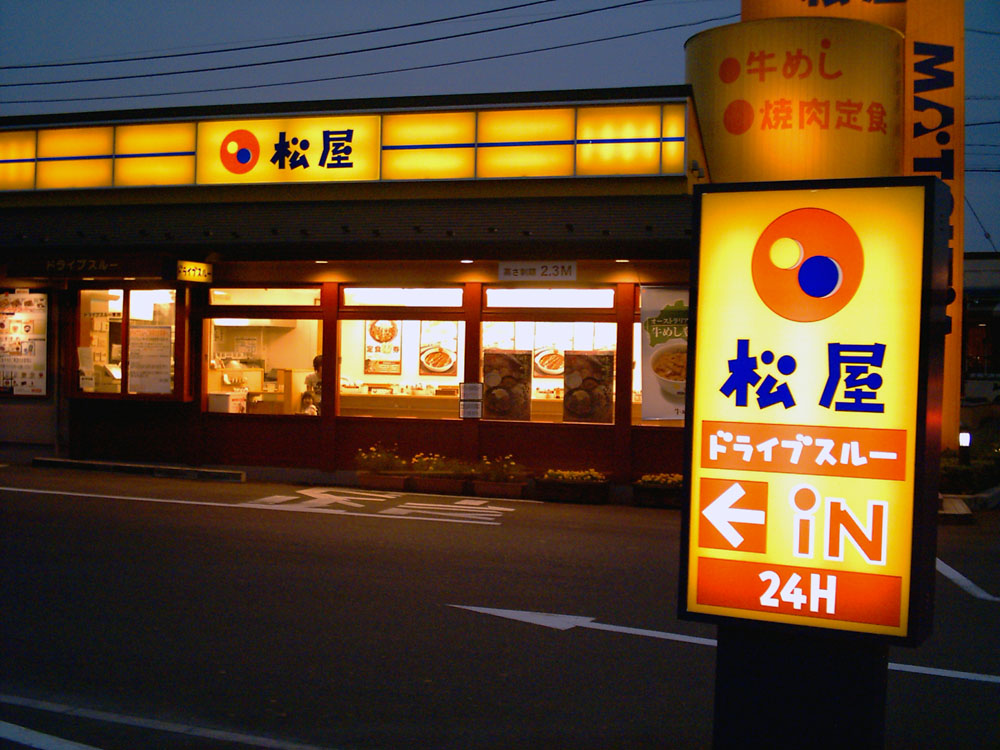
Matsuya is a major gyūdon chain in Japan, open 24 hours a day

Gyūdon can be found in many restaurants in Japan, and some fast food chains specialize exclusively in the dish. Many of these chain shops are open round the clock. The top three gyūdon chains in Japan are Sukiya (currently the largest gyūdon chain in Japan, established in Yokohama in 1981), Yoshinoya (the oldest and second largest, established in the Nihonbashi district of what is now Chūō, Tokyo in 1899), and Matsuya (established in Nerima, Tokyo in 1968).

Some of these establishments might refer to gyūdon by other names: Matsuya for instance sells gyūdon under the name gyūmeshi (牛めし), while Hanamaru Udon (はなまるうどん), a chain specializing mainly in Sanuki udon (currently a subsidiary of Yoshinoya), includes what it calls gyūniku gohan (牛肉ごはん, lit. "beef rice") in its menu.

While many establishments charge for miso soup or offer it as a part of a set, Matsuya is known for serving complimentary miso soup for customers who are eating in.

=== Customer specifications ===
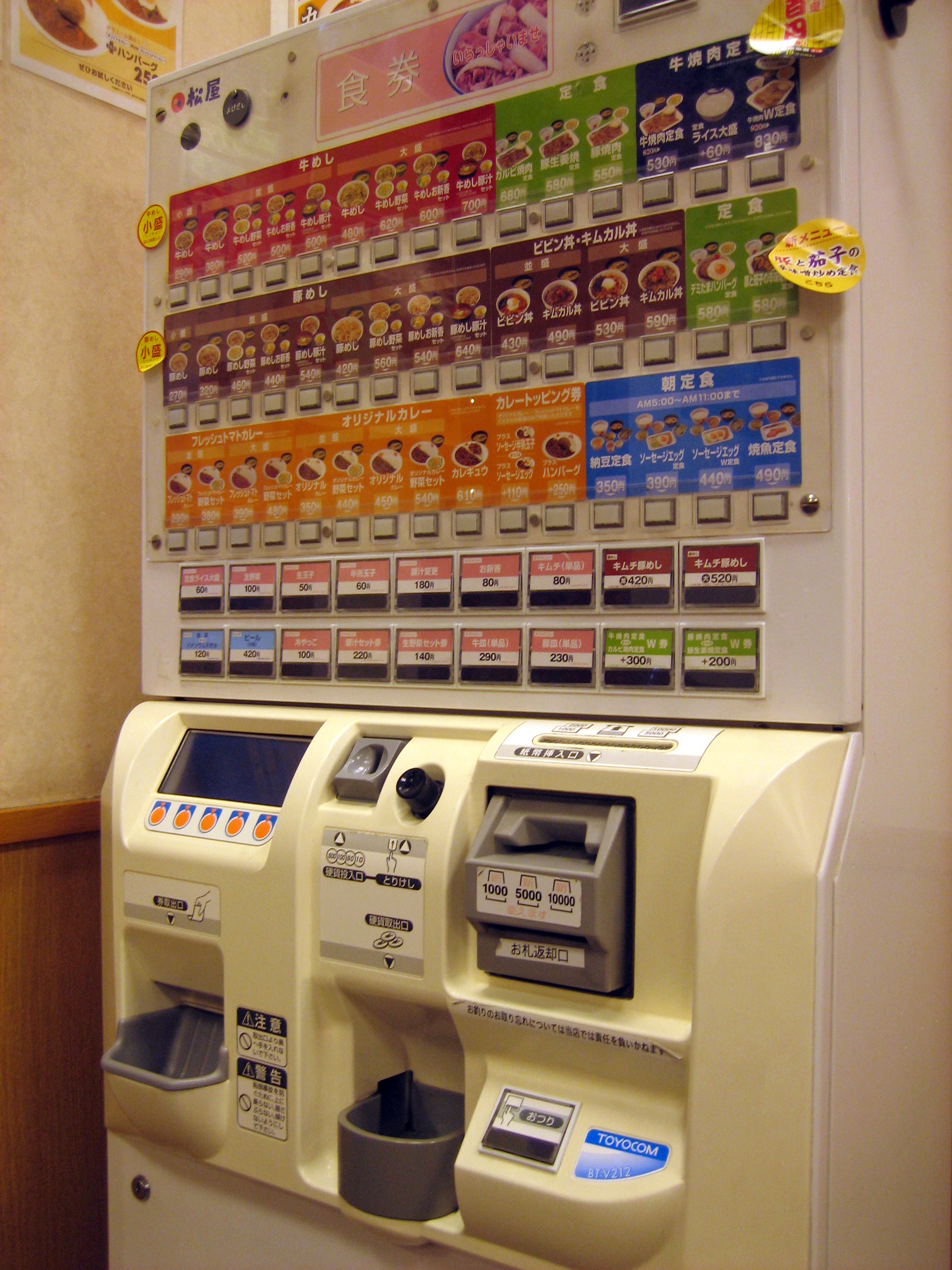
A shokken (food ticket) machine in a Matsuya restaurant

It is common to order gyūdon with extra sauce (tsuyudaku) or no sauce (tsuyunuki). Customers can request even more sauce with tsuyudakudaku or even tsuyudakudakudaku. Similar terms are used for ingredient adjustments, such as extra or no onions (negidaku and neginuki, respectively).

The practice of ordering tsuyudaku is speculated to have started in the 1950s as a code word originally used by staff and became widely used by the mid-1990s. The term may be an abbreviation of tsuyudakusan (tsuyu "sauce" + takusan "plenty", with the initial t- of takusan undergoing consonant voicing or rendaku) or derive from dakudaku, an onomatopoeic word for something dripping or overflowing. The suffix -daku later came to mean “extra” more generally, giving rise to expressions such as negidaku ("extra onions") and gomadaku ("extra sesame").

== Ban of US beef ==
As a consequence of the fear of mad cow disease and a ban on imports of beef from the United States, Yoshinoya and most competitors were forced to terminate gyūdon sales in Japan on 11 February 2004. Yoshinoya moved its business to a similar dish made with pork instead of beef, which it named butadon (豚丼). Sukiya continued to serve gyūdon using Australian beef while also offering its version of butadon called tondon (also written as 豚丼, ton being the Sino-Japanese reading or on'yomi of the character 豚, cf. tonkatsu, tonjiru).

The Japanese Diet voted to resume beef imports from the United States in early May 2005, but the ban was reinstated in January 2006 after detectable quantities of prohibited spine tissue were found in the first post-ban shipments arriving in Japan. As the issue was discussed between the United States and Japanese governments, gyūdon vendors and customers waited for a resolution. As of September 2006, the ban has been lifted.

== Chīgyū ==
Chīgyū (チー牛, an abbreviation of 'cheese gyūdon', i.e. gyūdon topped with grated and/or melted cheese) is a Japanese internet slang term used, often pejoratively, for people (usually men) perceived as introverted, socially awkward, or involved in niche interests (otaku). The term, first attested in the late 2010s, originated from a 2008 self-portrait by dōjinshi artist "ibiryo" depicting a younger version of himself ordering cheese gyūdon.

== Gallery ==
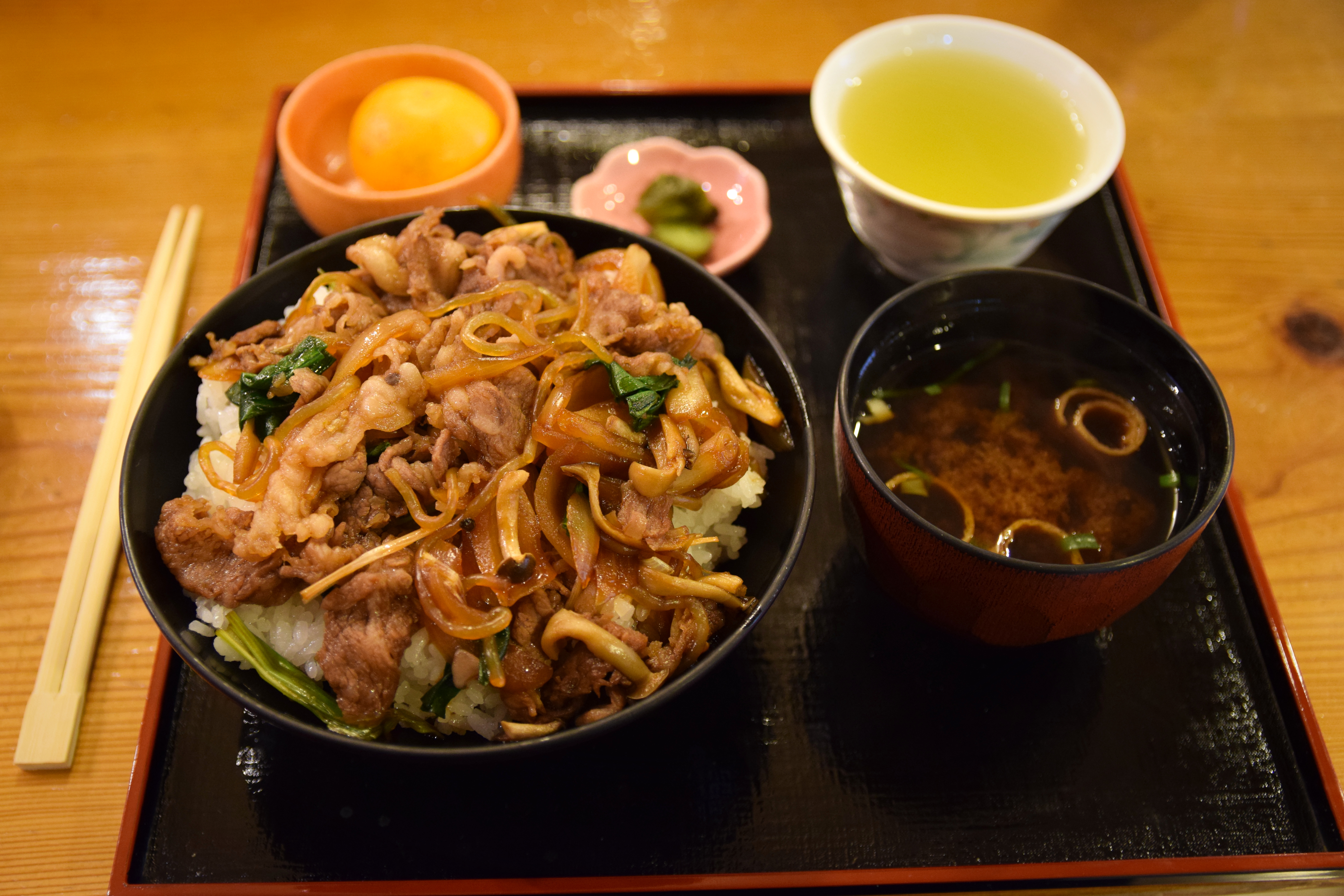
Matsusaka beef and miso soup

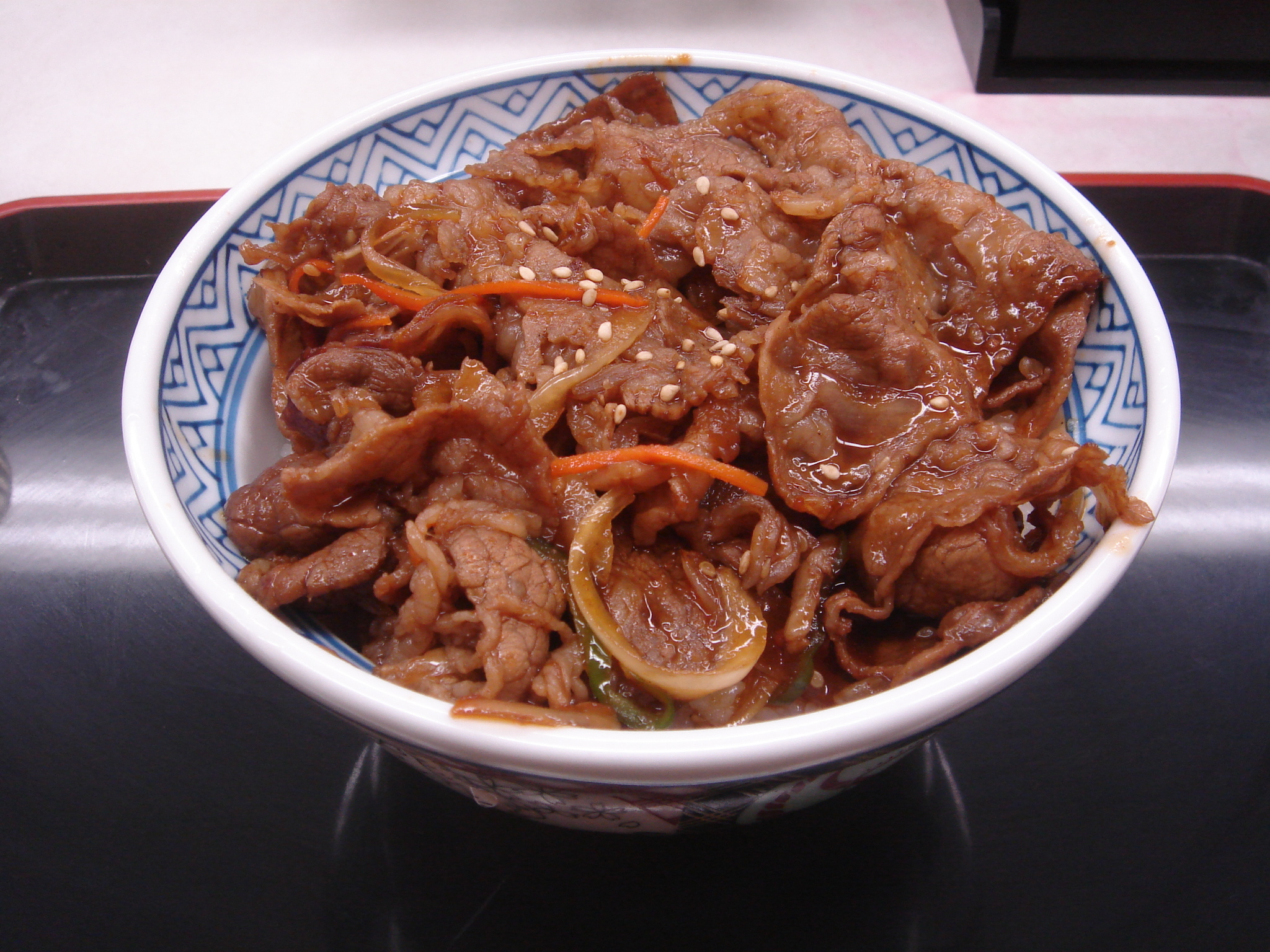
With yakiniku beef

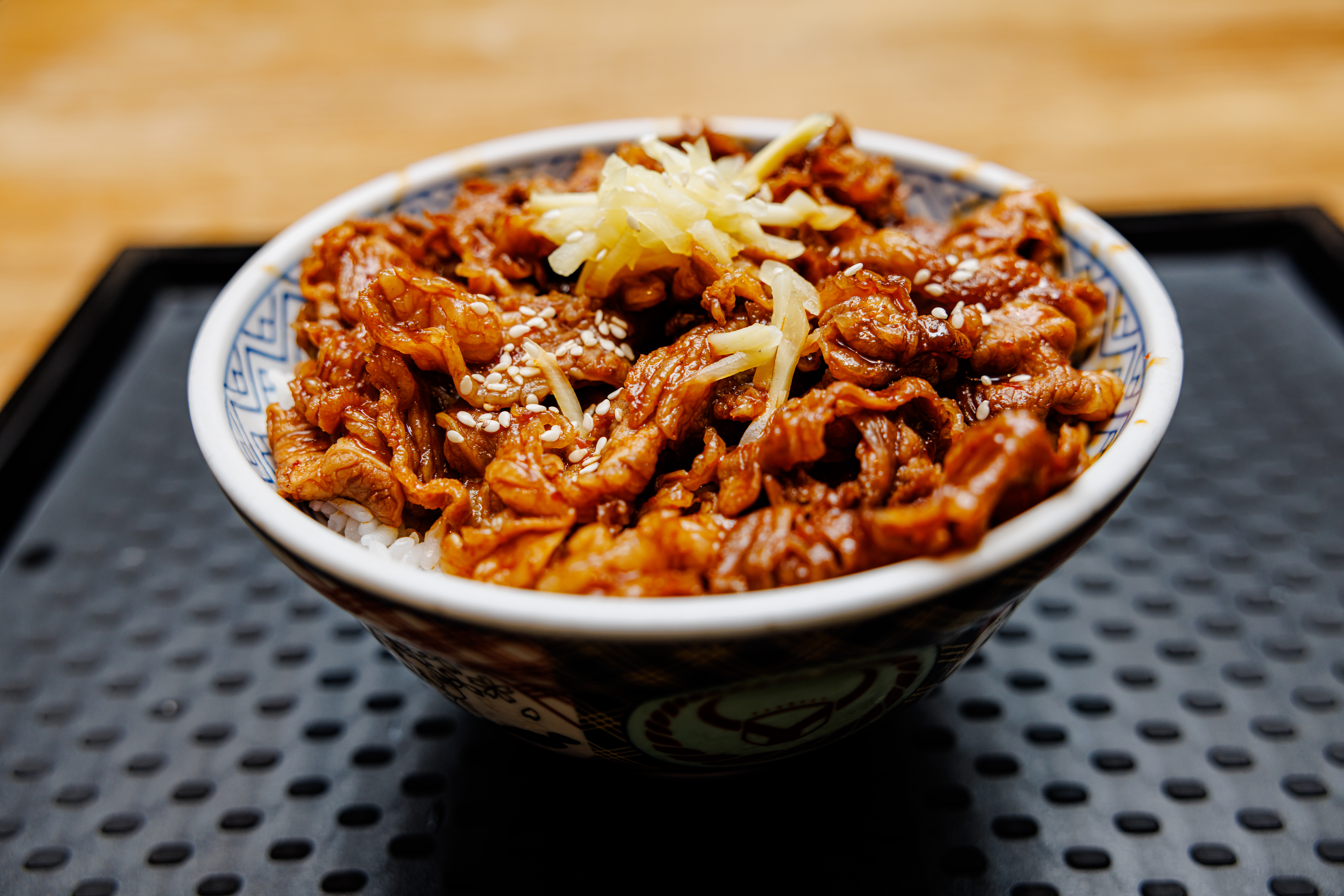
With sesame

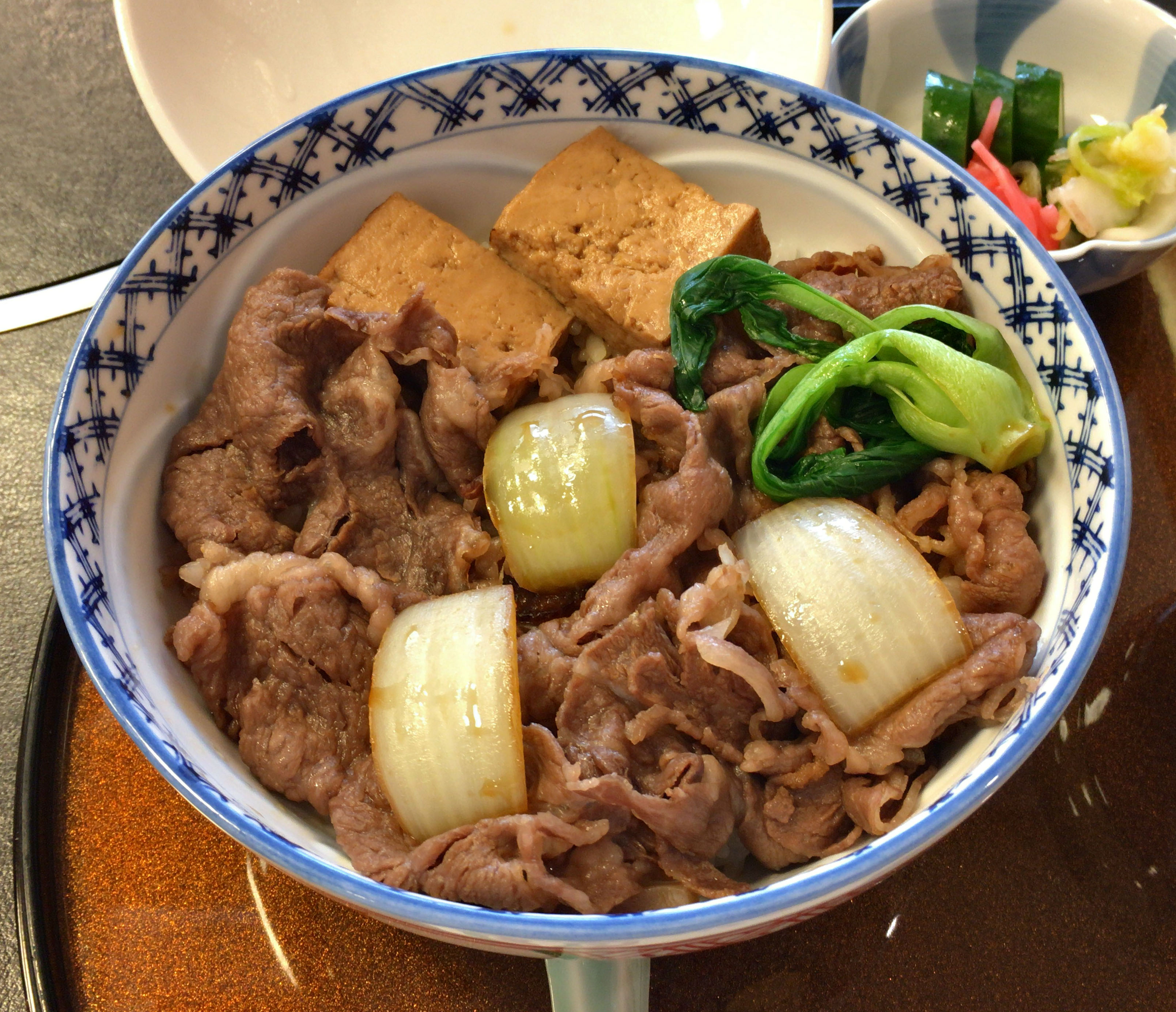
With tofu and bok choy

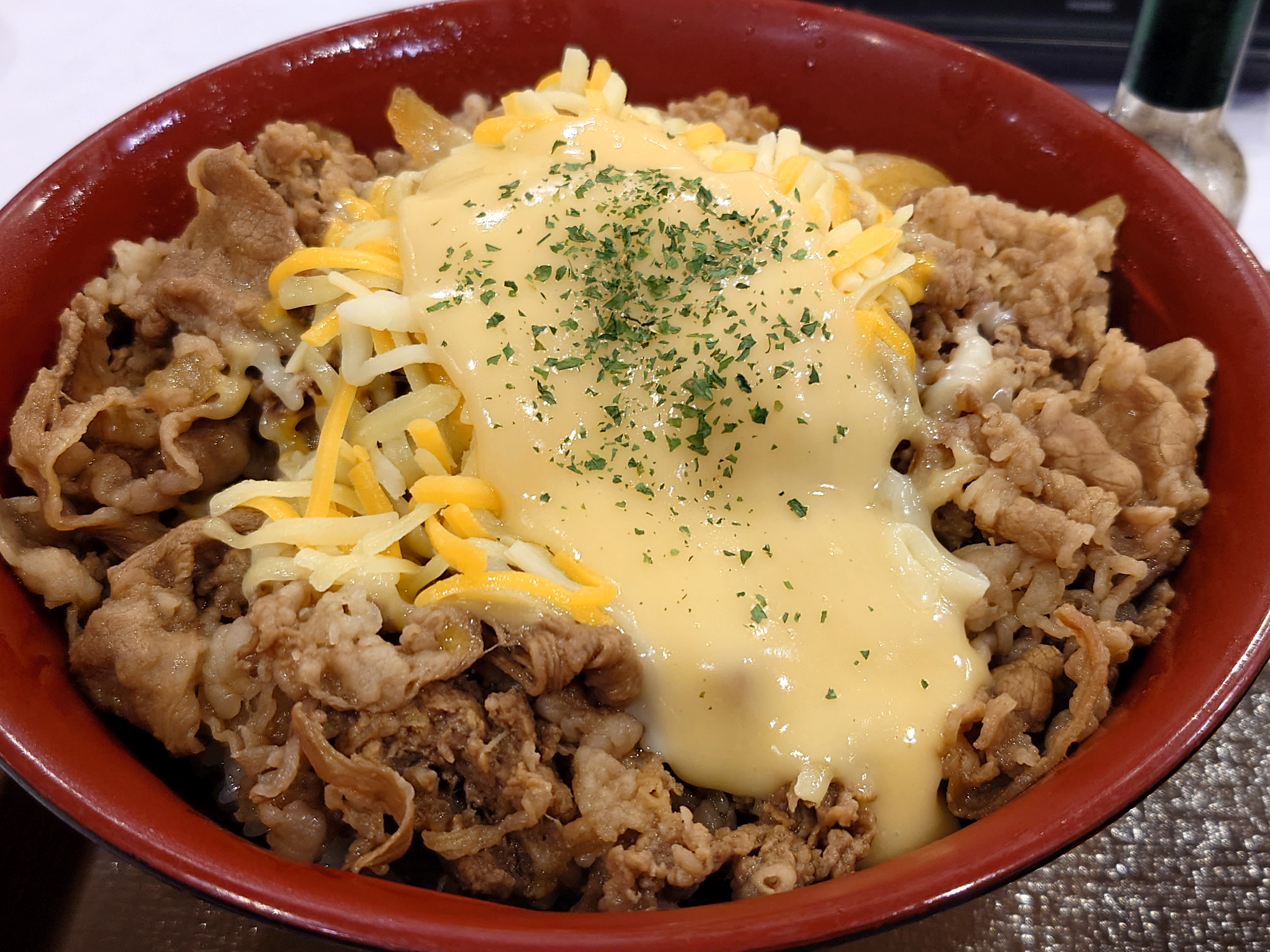
With cheese

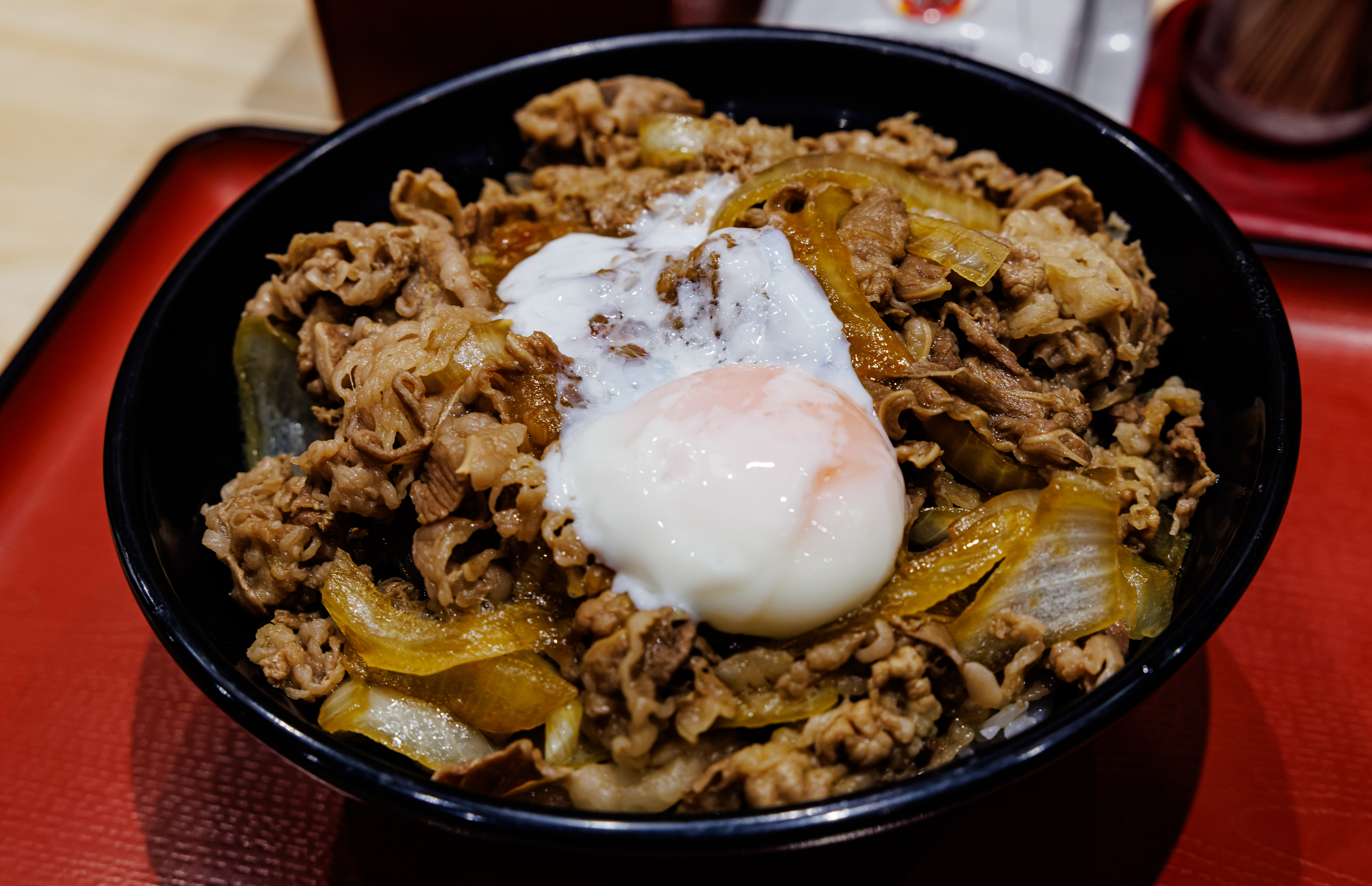
With poached egg

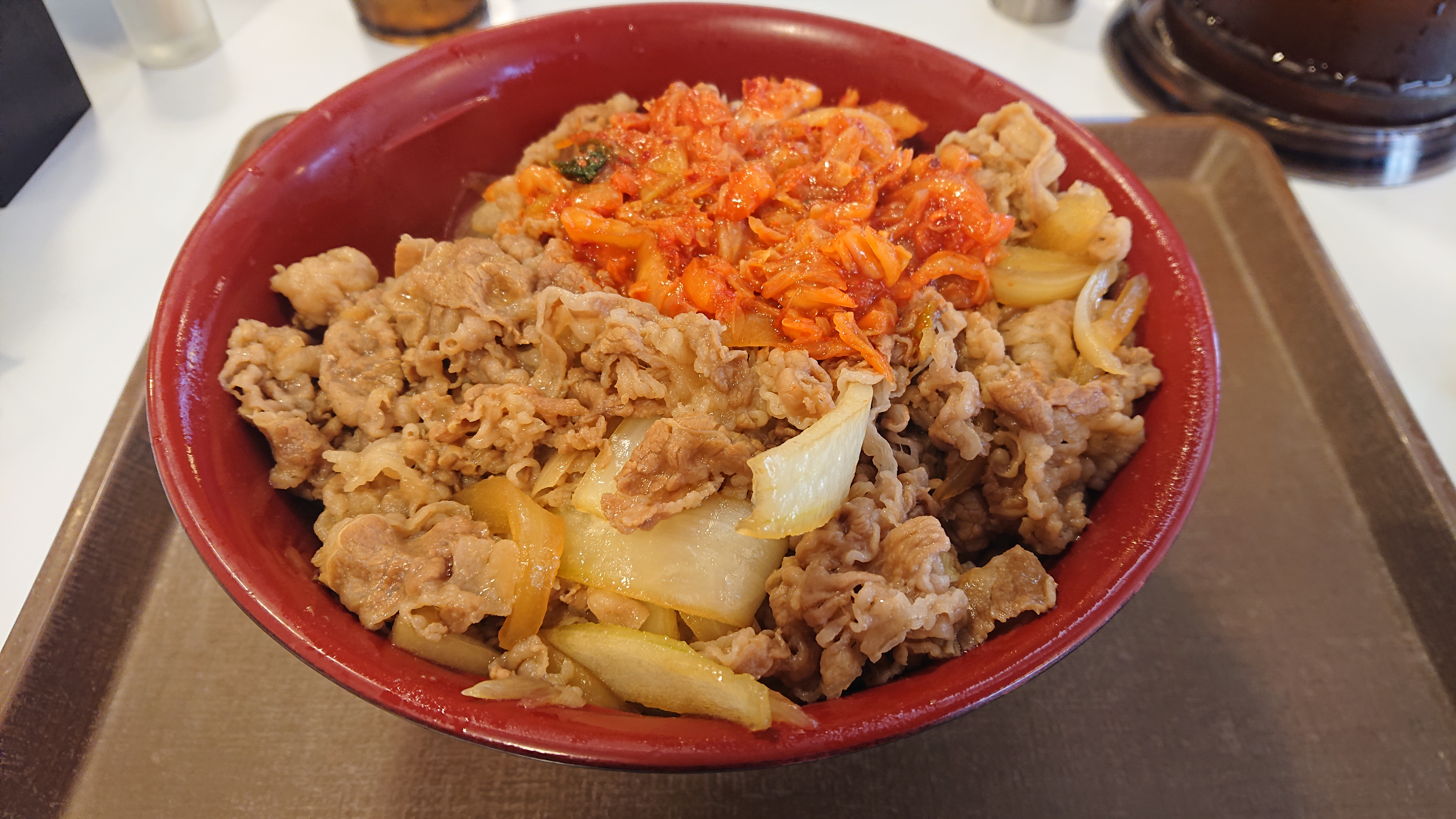
With kimchi and onions

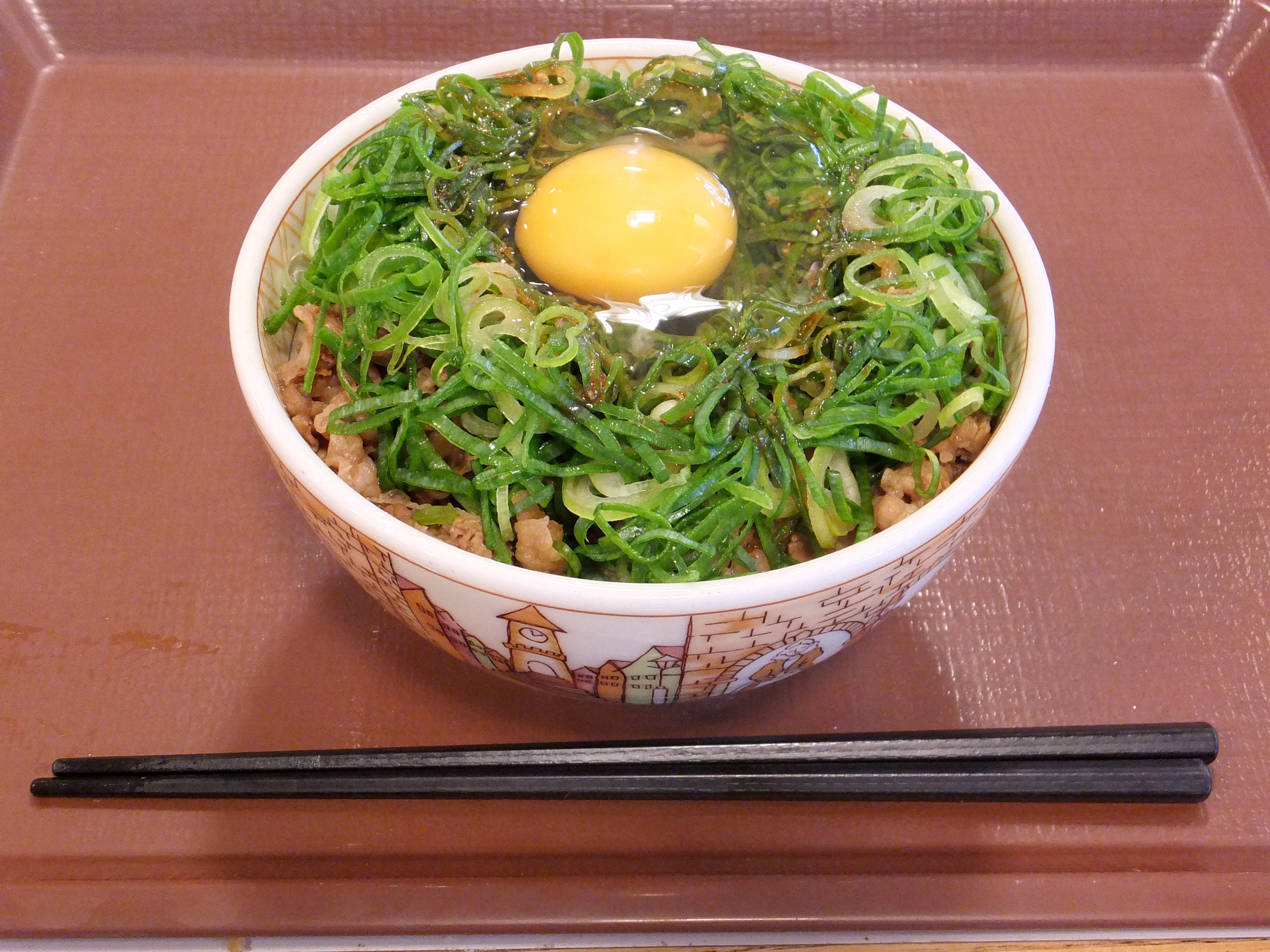
With negi and raw egg

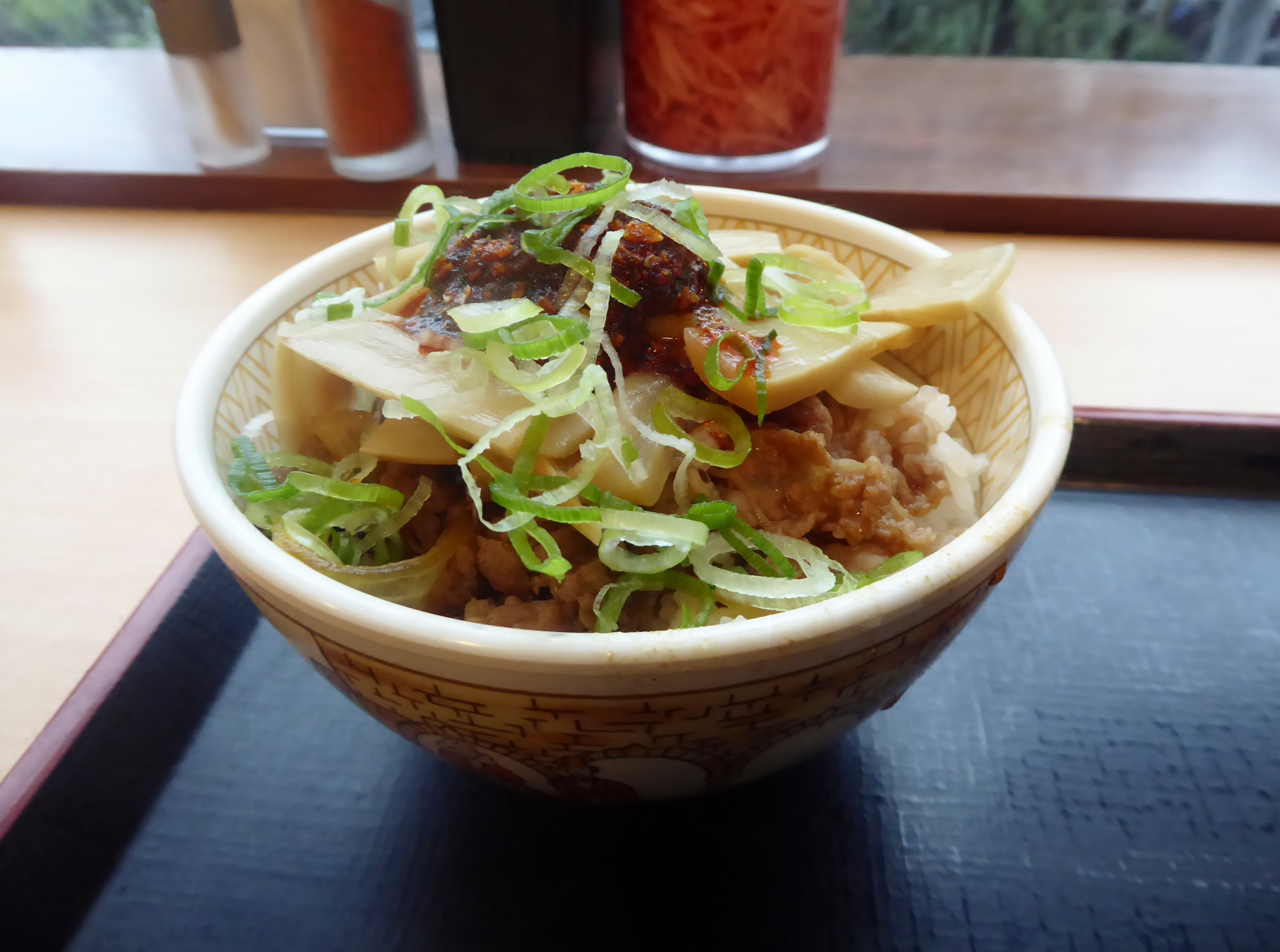
With menma

== See also ==
- Donburi
- Sukiyaki
- Katsudon
- Oyakodon
- Japanese curry
- Matsuya
- Sukiya
- Yoshinoya
