= Matsuya Foods =

Japanese restaurant chain

Matsuya Foods Holdings Co., Ltd.
- Traded as: TYO: 9887
- Founded: 16 January 1980
- Website: matsuyafoods.co.jp

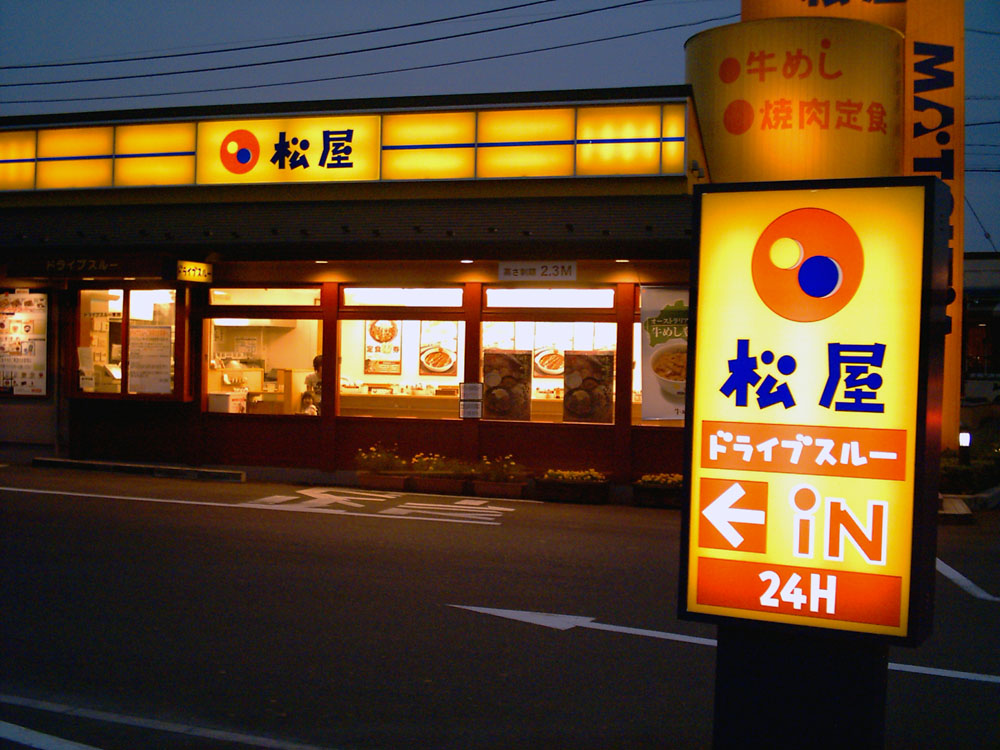
"Matsuya" is a major gyūdon chain in Japan.

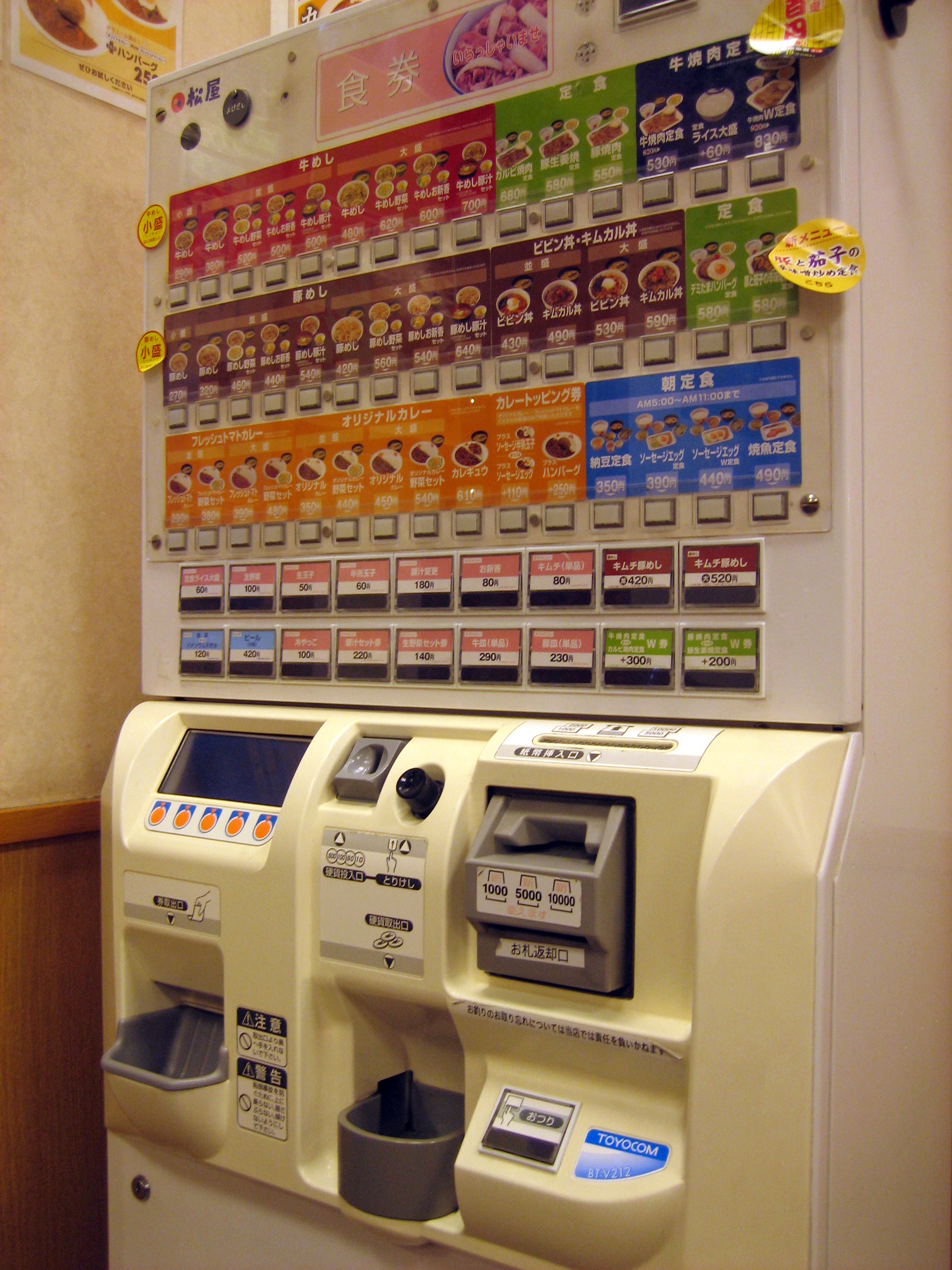
Food ticket machine in Matsuya

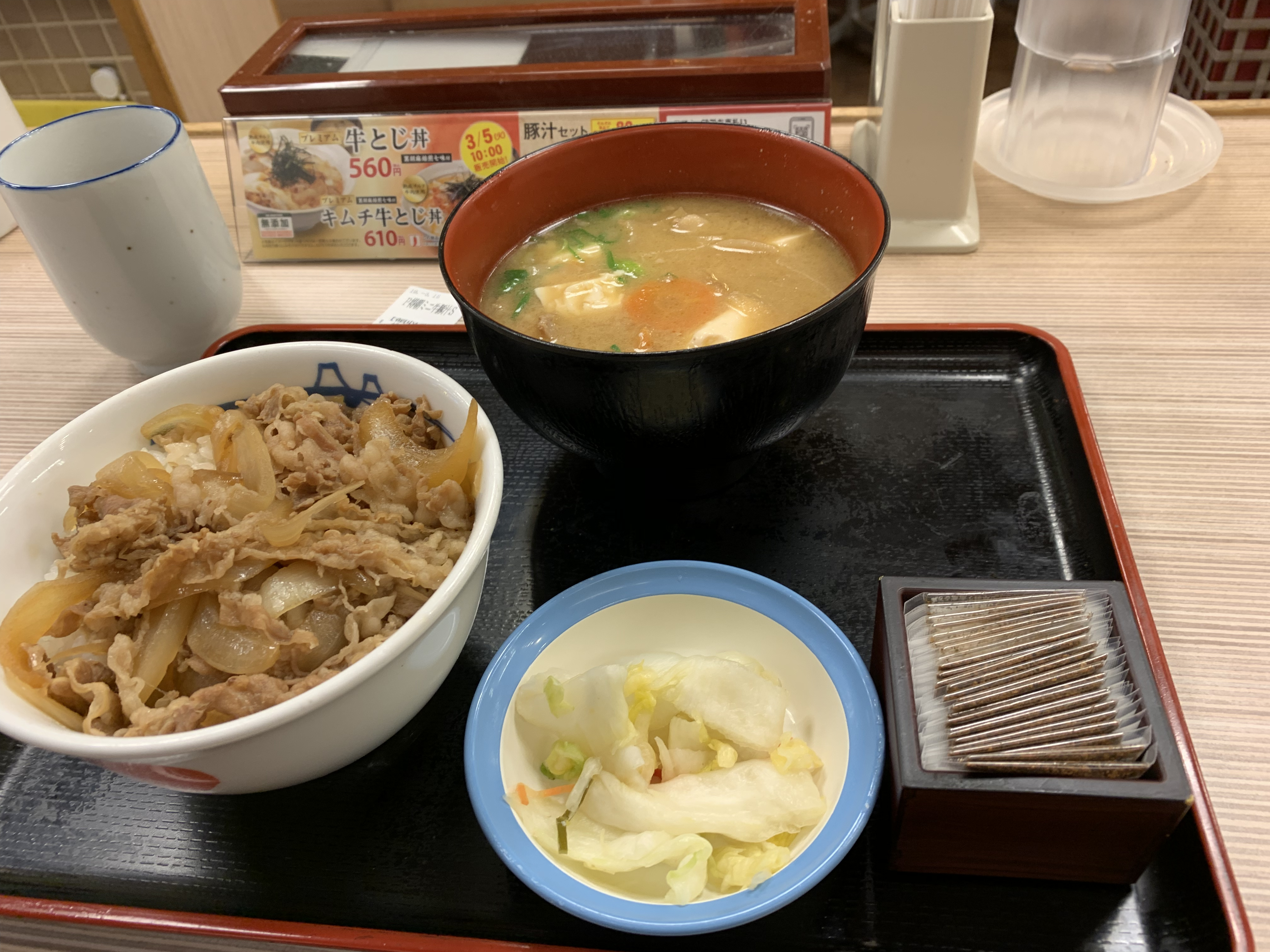

Matsuya Foods Co. (株式会社松屋フーズ, Kabushiki-gaisha Matsuya Fūzu) is a chain of restaurants, including Matsuya (松屋), which sells gyūdon (or gyūmeshi), Japanese curry, and teishoku. Matsuya was established in Japan in 1966, founded by Toshio Kawarabuki. As of 2025, Matsuya has 1,265 restaurants throughout 33 Japanese prefectures. Overseas stores can be found in mainland China, Hong Kong, Taiwan,Vietnam and Singapore. In addition to Matsuya, the company operates a chain of restaurants including curry, tonkatsu, sushi, and Chinese restaurants.

== In popular culture ==
Matsuya has been a long-time sponsor of the Yakuza videogame franchise, and the game's staple location of Kamurocho has always featured two Matsuya-based restaurants.

== See also ==
- Donburi
- Sukiya
- Yoshinoya
