= Shokken =

Japanese retail format

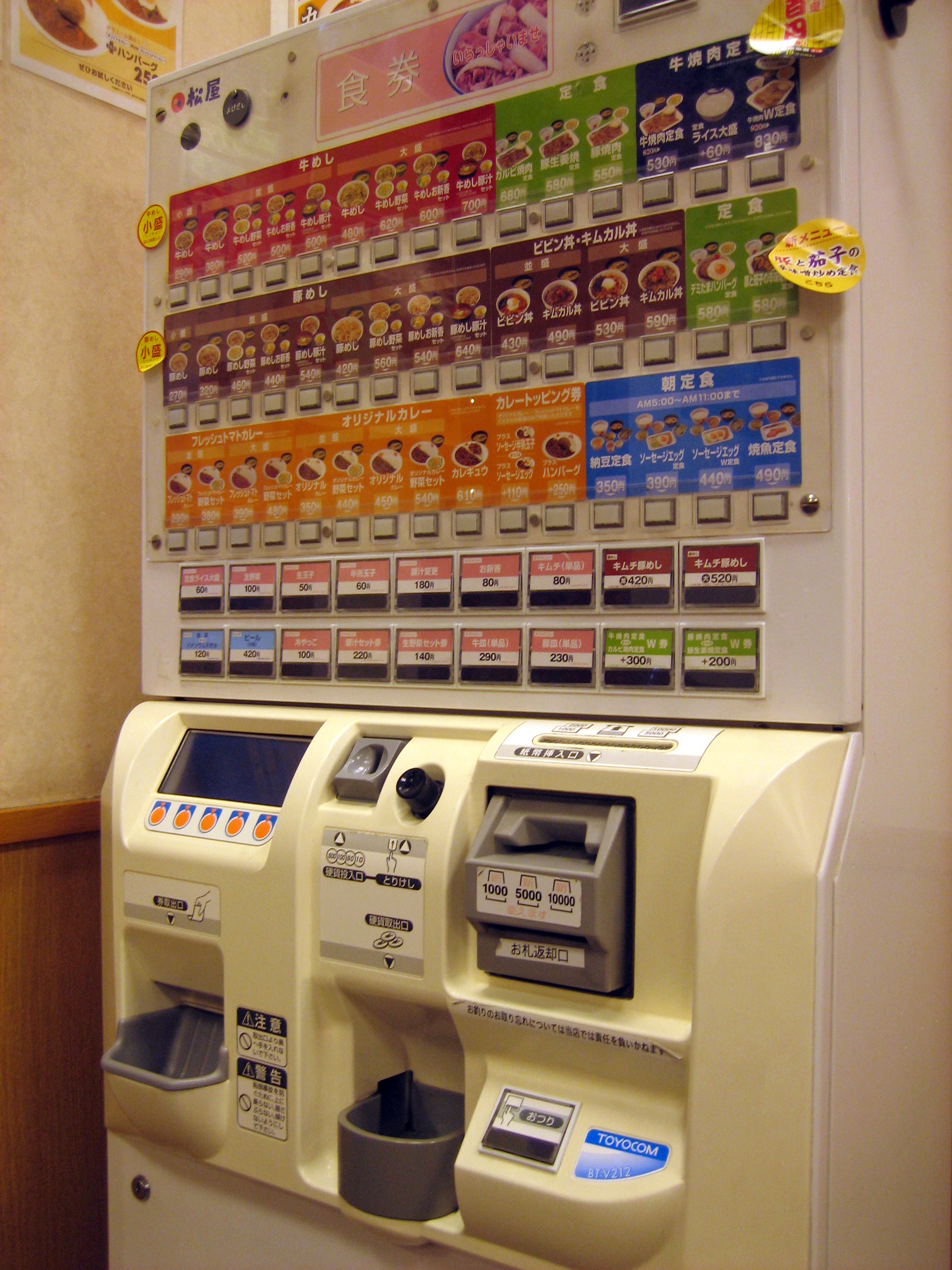
A shokken machine at a Matsuya restaurant

Shokken (食券 "food ticket") are a type of Japanese ticket machine/vending machine, usually used at restaurants for ordering food.

== Information ==
Shokken machines were first seen in 1926 at Tokyo Station There are currently over 43,000 shokken machines in Japan.

Shokken are often found in restaurants, cafes, fast-food restaurants and other establishments. A typical shokken machine features buttons where the customer can select an item, a coin slot, where the customer can pay for the item and a printer where the customer can receive their receipt. Upon receiving their receipt, the customer can then exchange their receipt for their purchased item. Shokken machines can be standalone machines and sometimes are located on countertops and tables.

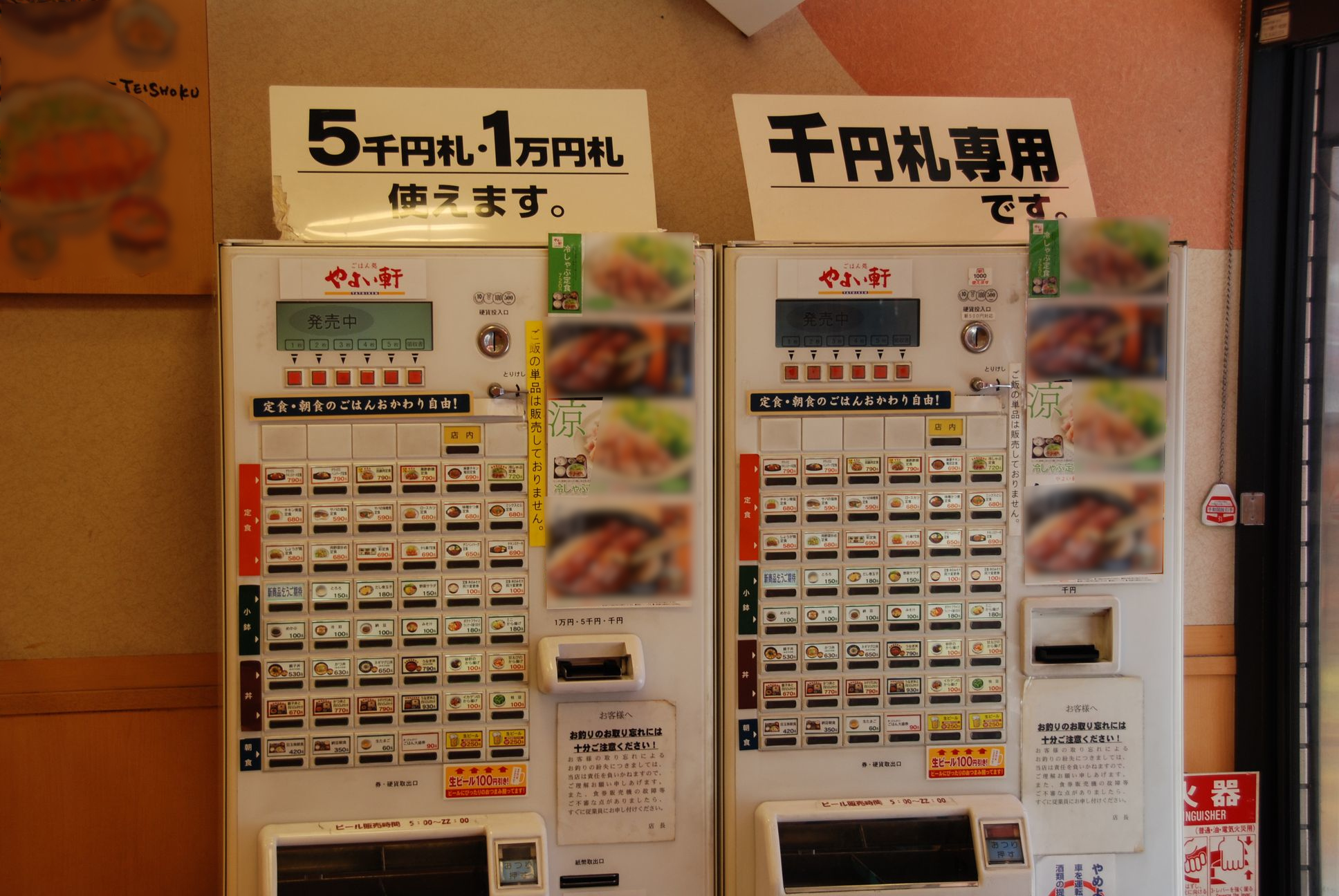
Shokken ticket machines at a restaurant

Companies often use shokken machines as they can reduce the amount of staff needed, reduce theft, reduce the turnover rate and can help reduce ordering errors. While useful, shokken machines are not associated with a fine dining atmosphere, as they are often seen in inexpensive restaurants such as Matsuya, Yoshinoya and Sukiya. Shokken machines also can break and limit customized orders.
