= Yoshinoya =

Japanese fast food restaurant chain

Yoshinoya Holdings Co., Ltd.

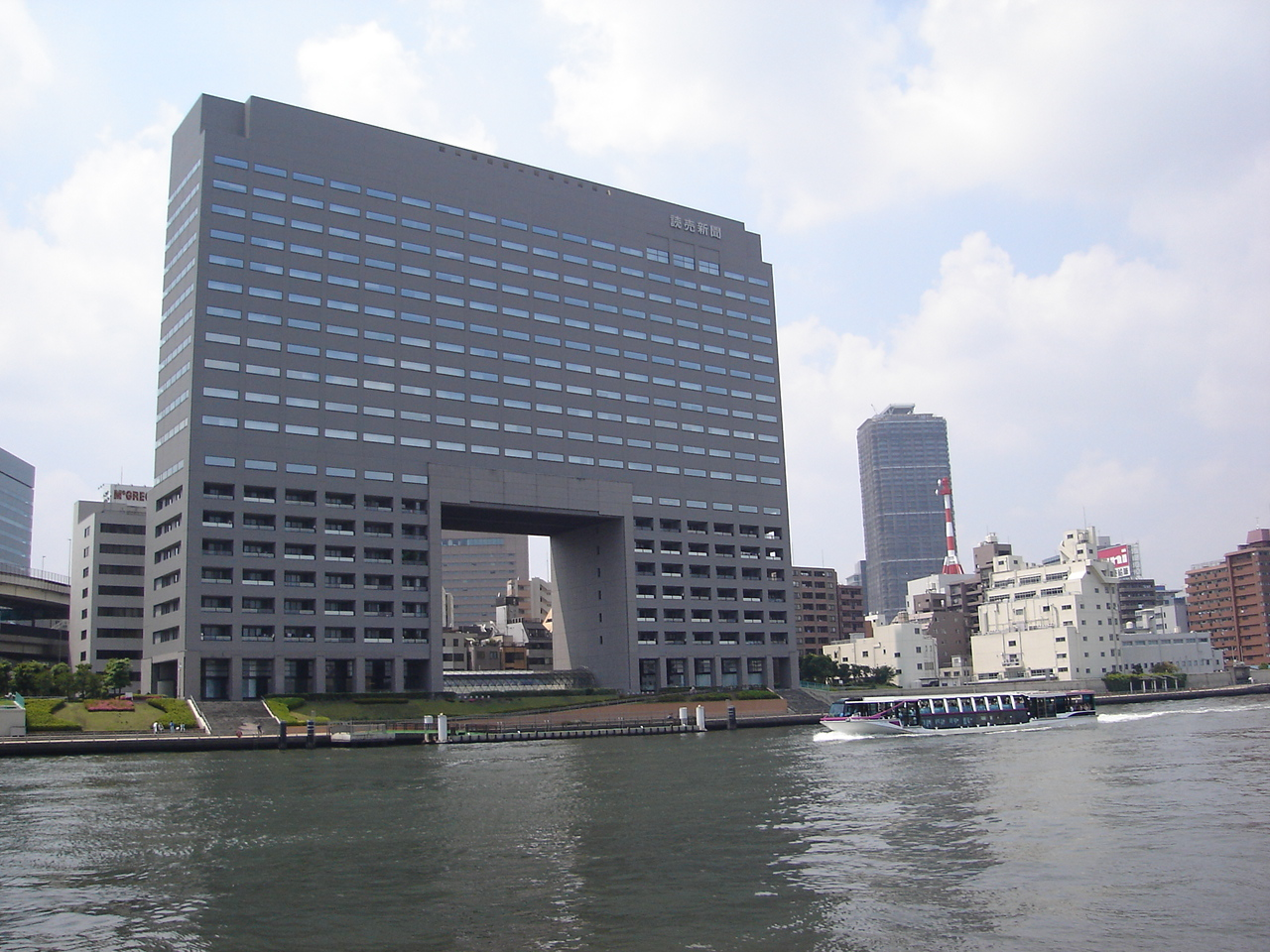
- Headquarters at Daiwa Rivergate
- Type: Public
- Traded as: TYO: 9861
- Industry: Foodservice
- Founded: Tokyo, Japan (1899; 127 years ago)
- Founder: Eikichi Matsuda (松田栄吉)
- Headquarters: Kita, Tokyo, Japan
- Number of locations: 1,211 (June 2023)
- Areas served: East Asia; Southeast Asia; United States
- Key people: Shuji Abe, President and CEO
- Products: Fast food
- Website: yoshinoya.com YoshinoyaAmerica.com

Yoshinoya (吉野家) is a Japanese multinational fast food chain, and the second-largest chain of gyūdon (beef bowl) restaurants. The chain was established in Japan in 1899. Its motto is "Tasty, low-priced, and quick".

== Etymology and logo ==
The kanji 吉 (yoshi) means "luck" in Japanese, the kanji 野 (no) means "field", and the kanji 家 (ya) means "house".

The founder of the company, Eikichi Matsuda (松田栄吉), was from the former town of Yoshino (吉野町) in Osaka Prefecture, and a belief predominates that Yoshino is the origin of the name.

In Japan, the nickname of the restaurant is yoshigyū (吉牛), which is an abbreviation of Yoshinoya no gyūdon (吉野家の牛丼, Yoshinoya's gyūdon).

Old logo before the 2012 rebranding, still in use outside the US

Yoshinoya logo in the US

The logo of Yoshinoya depicts bull horns, and was created by Yoshinoya's founder Eikichi Matsuda. The stylized bull horns were derived from the shape of the initial letter in Yoshinoya's English name, "Y". The rope surrounding the horns references Japanese sumo-wrestling, where the word "Yokozuna" is equivalent to "winner," representing the quality of the food served in Yoshinoya. The surrounding rope is made up of 27 rice grains. The logo as a whole is meant to suggest that Yoshinoya sells the "best beef bowls".

== History ==
Yoshinoya first opened in 1899 at the Nihonbashi fish market in Tokyo. When the market was devastated by the Great Kantō earthquake, Yoshinoya moved to the new Tsukiji fish market in Tokyo in 1926.

The chain opened its first 24-hour store in 1952.

On December 27, 1958, the chain's business model was changed from self-employed restaurants to a stock company, as an attempt to gain more profit.

In 1965, the chain earned a million dollars in sales, which led to the idea of expanding the chain's operations in Japan.

The chain's first franchised store was opened in Shinsaibashi, in 1968.

In 1975, the first American store of the fast-food chain was opened in Colorado. In the early 2000s, Yoshinoya, along with other chains such as McDonald's, triggered a price war in Japan by introducing a regular beef bowl dish for ¥280, or around US$3.

== Locations ==
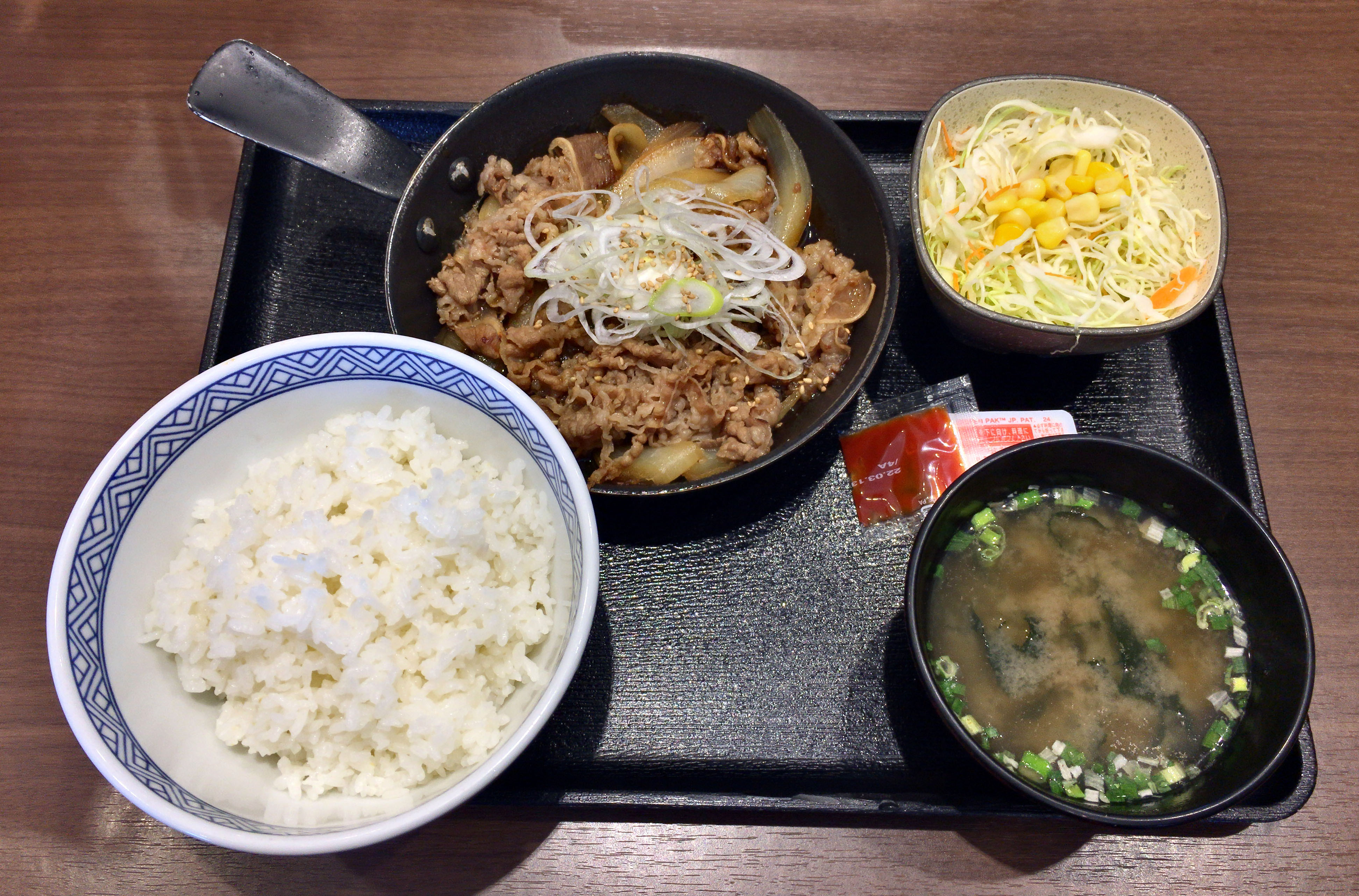
A Yoshinoya meal

Yoshinoya has a chain of stores in Japan, the United States, Cambodia, China, Indonesia, Mongolia, Philippines, Singapore, Taiwan, Hong Kong, Thailand, and formerly Malaysia. Yoshinoya closed down its final branches in Malaysia and completely exited the Malaysian market in 2021.

=== Japan ===
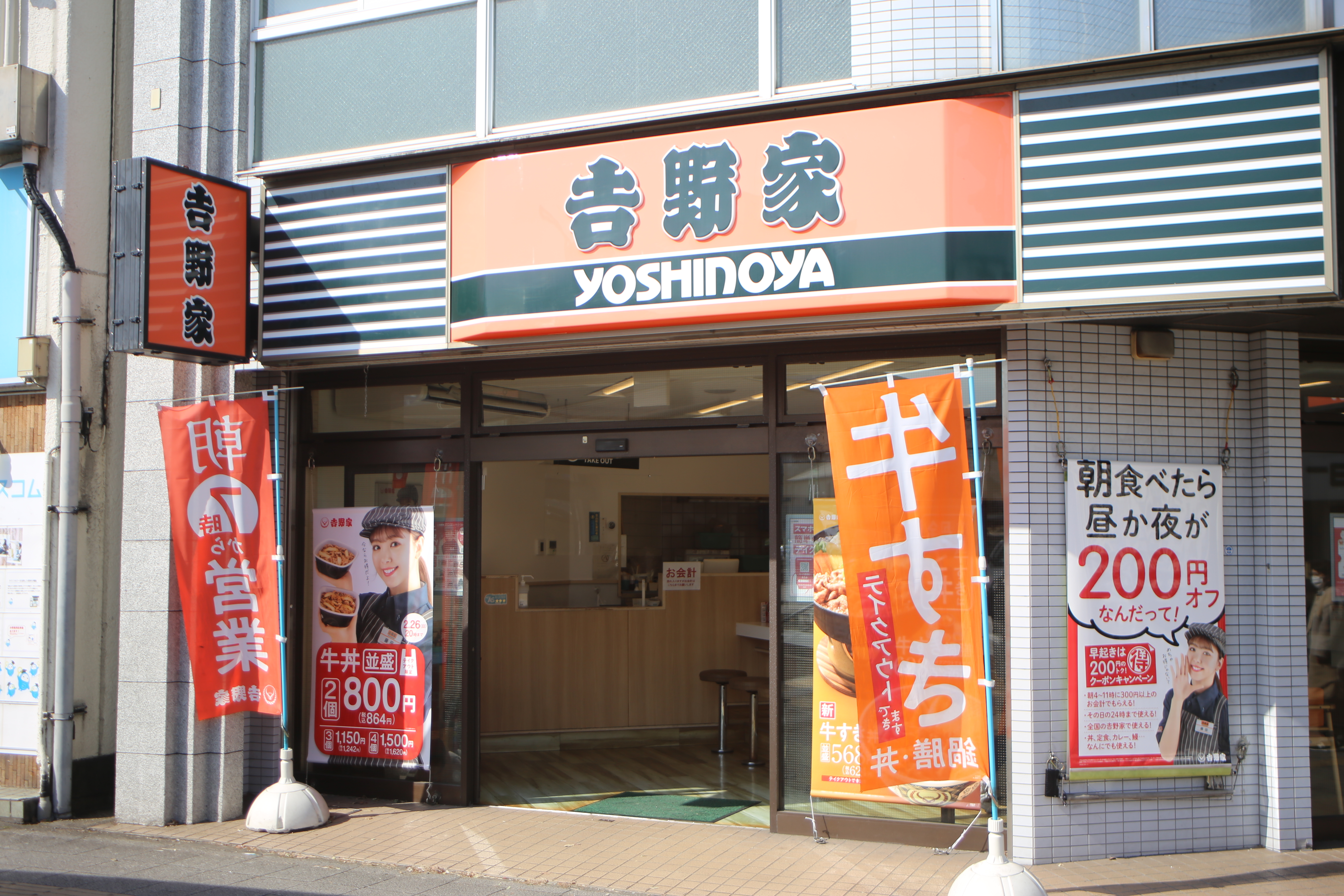
Yoshinoya in Nagoya

In its restaurants in Japan, tables are often counters, and in that case, they take orders over those counters. Chopsticks are provided. The menu includes standard-serving (並盛, namimori; or nami), large-serving (大盛, ōmori), or extra-large-serving (特盛, tokumori) beef bowls, pork bowls (豚丼, butadon), raw eggs (to stir and pour on top, sometimes mixed with soy sauce), soft-boiled eggs (半熟玉子, hanjuku tamago), miso soup, and pickles (called oshinkō [お新香] in its menu; a kind of asazuke). They also serve red ginger (beni shōga), spice, and Japanese tea (お茶, ocha) free of charge. Some menus including raw eggs and miso soup can be taken out.

Some customers make special requests at no extra charge such as: extra gravy sauce (つゆだく, tsuyudaku), extra onions (ねぎだく, negidaku), without gravy sauce (つゆ抜き, tsuyunuki), no onions (ねぎ抜き, neginuki), egg-yolk only (黄身だけ, kimidake), and less rice (軽いの, karui no; literally "light one").

On June 14, 2011, Yoshinoya in Japan started serving eel bowls (鰻丼, unadon) as a standard seasonal menu to be offered until the latter part of July.

=== United States ===
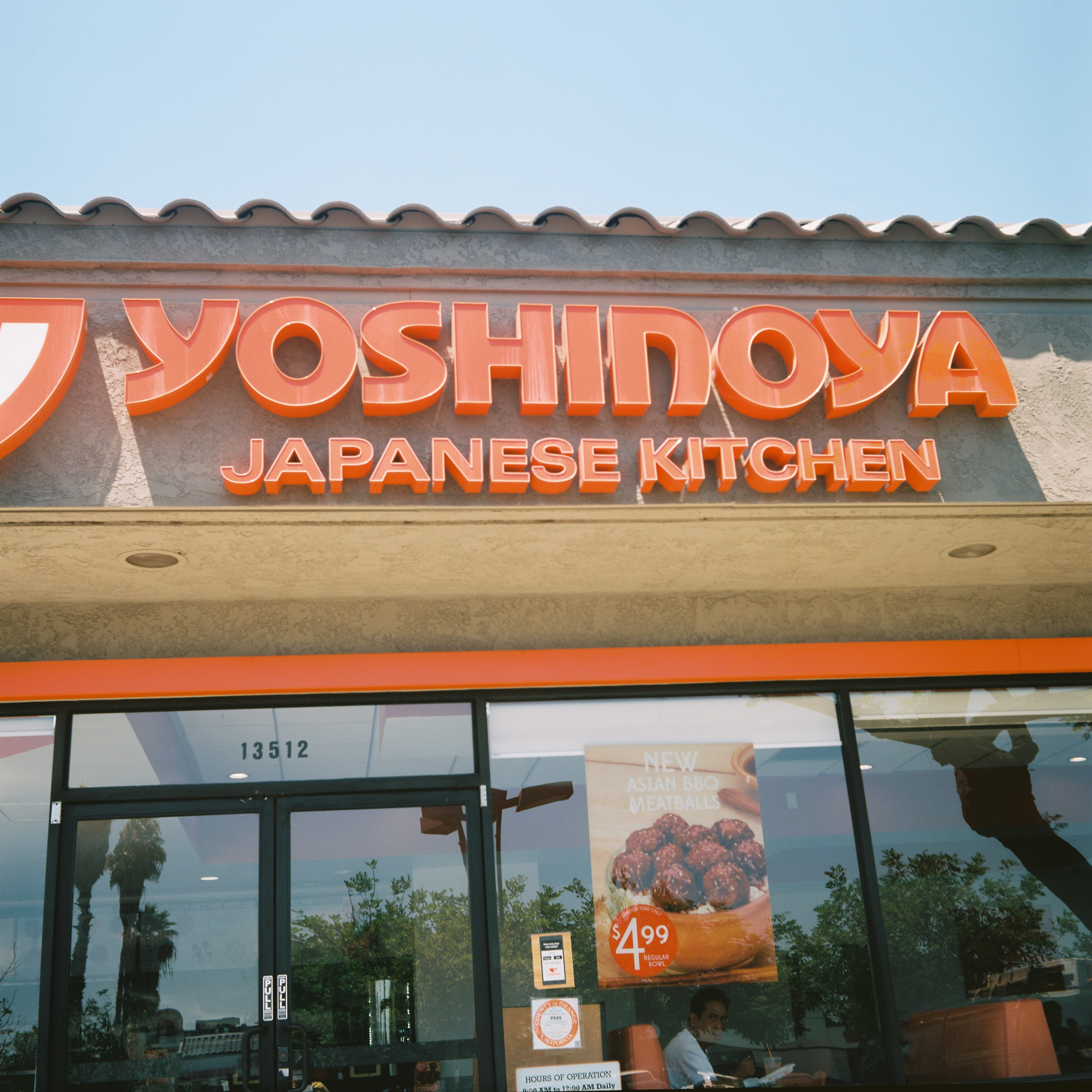
Yoshinoya in Garden Grove, California

Yoshinoya entered the United States opening a corporate office in Denver in 1973, and then its first retail location in Denver in 1975. (This location later became "Kokoro", a similar restaurant run by Mas Torito who had previous experience at a location in Japan.) Yoshinoya is currently only present in California. A location in Las Vegas, Nevada, went out of business in February 2017. A location in Goodyear, Arizona, opened in 2008, but went out of business in December 2011. A Dallas location that opened in June 2011 was Yoshinoya's first venture into Texas, but it went out of business in December of that year. The first location east of the Mississippi River opened on 42nd Street off Times Square, New York City, in 2002. Two more stores opened in other Manhattan locations, but Yoshinoya later filed for Chapter 11 bankruptcy in 2008, and later all the New York City stores went out of business by January 2012.

In March 2020, as a result of the COVID-19 pandemic, indoor dining was temporarily abandoned, with take-away, drive-thru or pick-up service still available.

The main menu in the United States includes the beef bowl, chicken bowl, combo bowl, and shrimp bowl, along with soup and desserts, and has variations such as "beef with vegetables bowls", "teriyaki chicken bowls", and barbecue-style plates. Skinless chicken is available upon request. Tempura bowls are no longer available. The menu of Yoshinoya in the U.S. is similar to that in Japan. At a basic level, both companies serve several recipes over a bowl of rice, which includes the trademark beef bowl with very thinly sliced beef plus light sauce and onions.

=== Taiwan ===
Yoshinoya entered the Taiwanese market in 1987 with the establishment of Taiwan Yoshinoya Co., Ltd. through a joint venture. It opened its first Asian branch outside Japan along Guanqian Road in Zhongzheng District, Taipei in 1988.

=== China ===
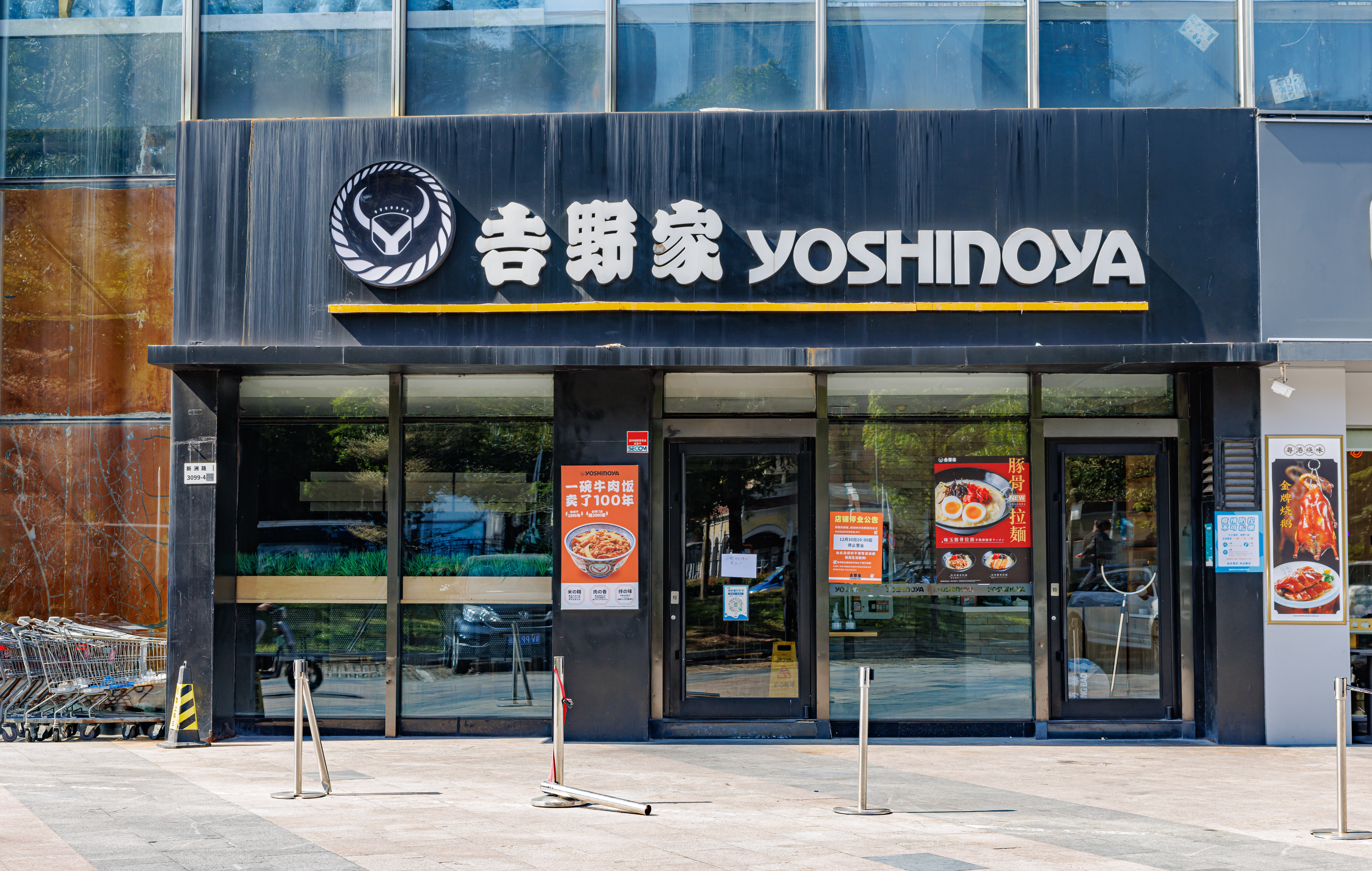
Yoshinoya restaurant in Futian District, Shenzhen

Yoshinoya opened its first Chinese branch at Wangfujing, Beijing in 1992. It was later expanded beginning in 2002, the year of opening of its branches in Shanghai (flagship branch) and Shenzhen.

In 2015, Yoshinoya China Holdings Co., Ltd. was established. As of 2021, there are 390 Yoshinoya branches in China. That same year, Hop Hing Group Holdings, the operator of Yoshinoya and Dairy Queen in China, decided to go private.

=== Hong Kong ===
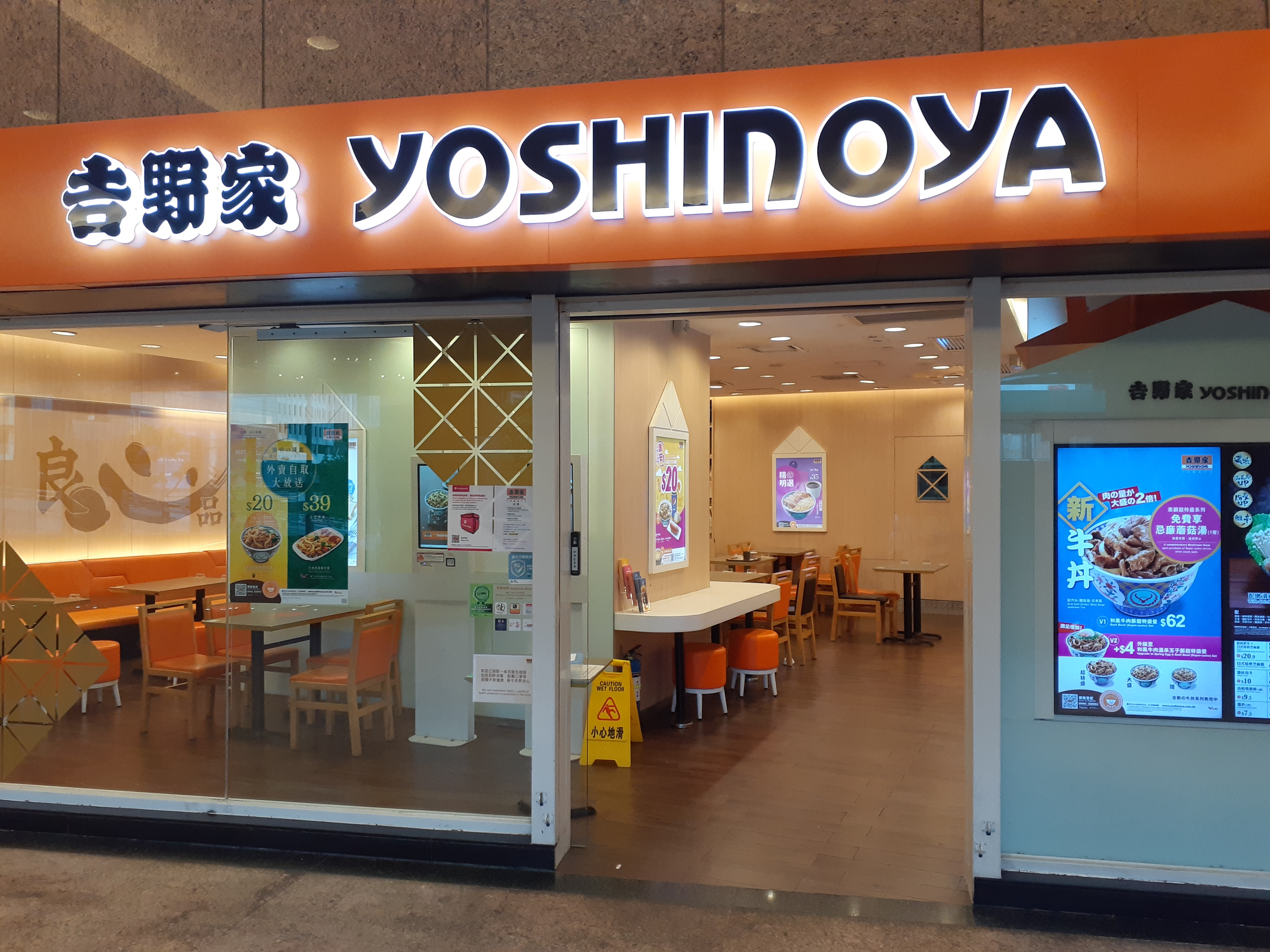
Yoshinoya restaurant at Sun Hung Kai Centre Shopping Arcade, Hong Kong

The Hong Kong division of Yoshinoya was founded in 1991. Currently, 50 Yoshinoya food stores are split among three main areas: the Hong Kong branch, the New Territories branch, and the Kowloon branch. Fourteen stores are in the Hong Kong branch, 21 stores are in the New Territories branch, and 22 stores are in the Kowloon branch. Each Yoshinoya food store has five working positions: store manager, supervisor, customer service assistant, crew, and production assistant.

Unlike the Yoshinoya in Japan, stores in Hong Kong do not provide table services. Customers order their food at a cashier and collect their food on a tray there, which is the same as in Western fast-food stores and international Food Court outlets elsewhere.

=== Philippines ===
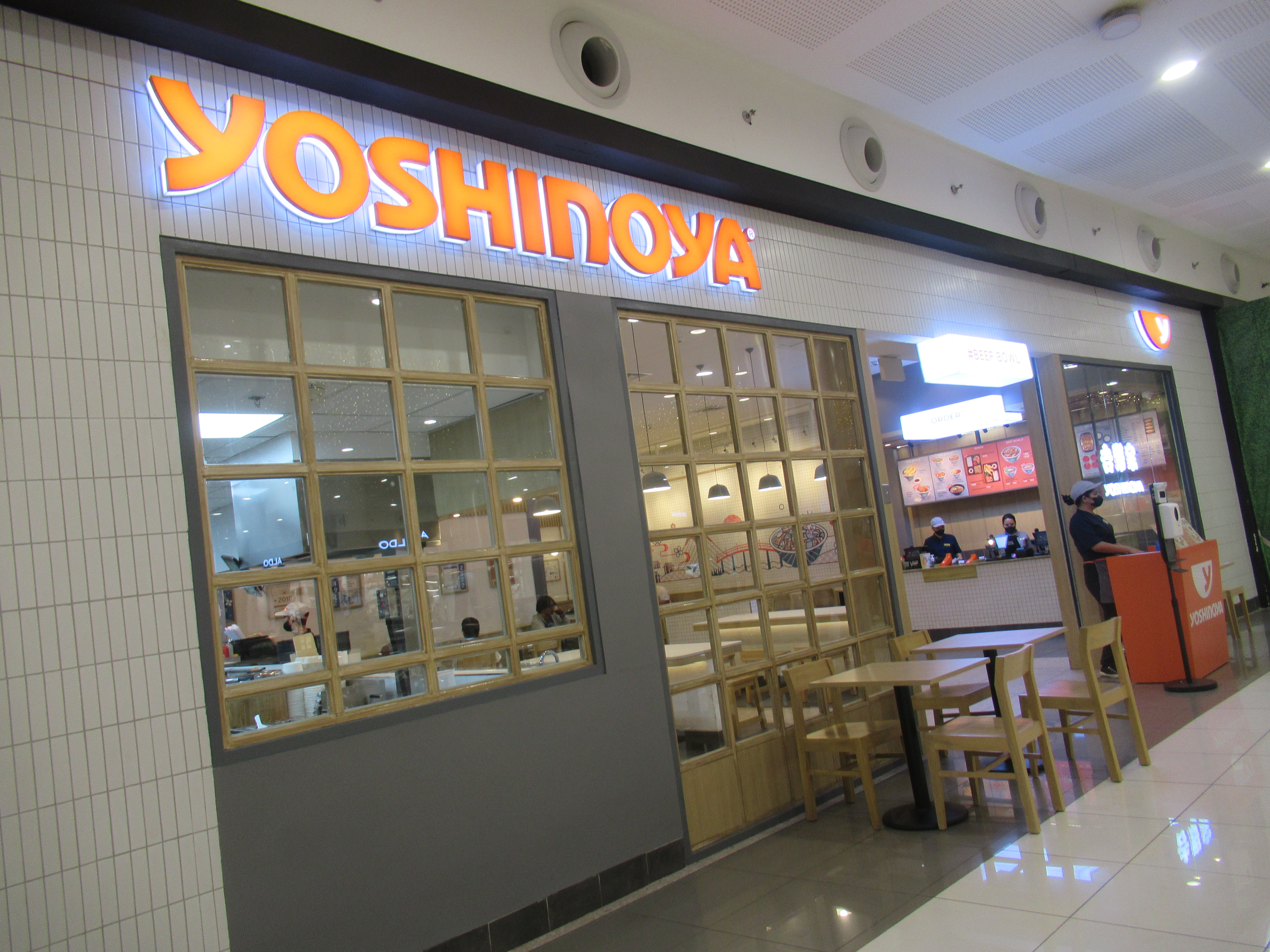
Yoshinoya restaurant at SM City Grand Central, Caloocan

In 1992, the first Philippine franchisee of Yoshinoya was established, with its first store at Robinsons Galleria, Quezon City that opened on June 12. However, it operated until October 1993. It later changed to direct management.

In 2001, Yoshinoya re-entered the Philippine market through a joint-venture between Yoshinoya and the Century Pacific Group named Yoshinoya Century Pacific Inc. Its first store since re-entry opened in Metro Point Mall, Pasay on December 15, 2001.

In 2021, following the end of the partnership between Yoshinoya and the Century Pacific Group, Yoshinoya formed a new joint-venture with Jollibee Foods Corporation that would serve as the next franchisee of Yoshinoya in the Philippines. Under the new deal, there are plans to open 50 stores in the country in the long-term.

As of 2023, there are seven Yoshinoya stores operating in the Philippines.

=== Indonesia ===
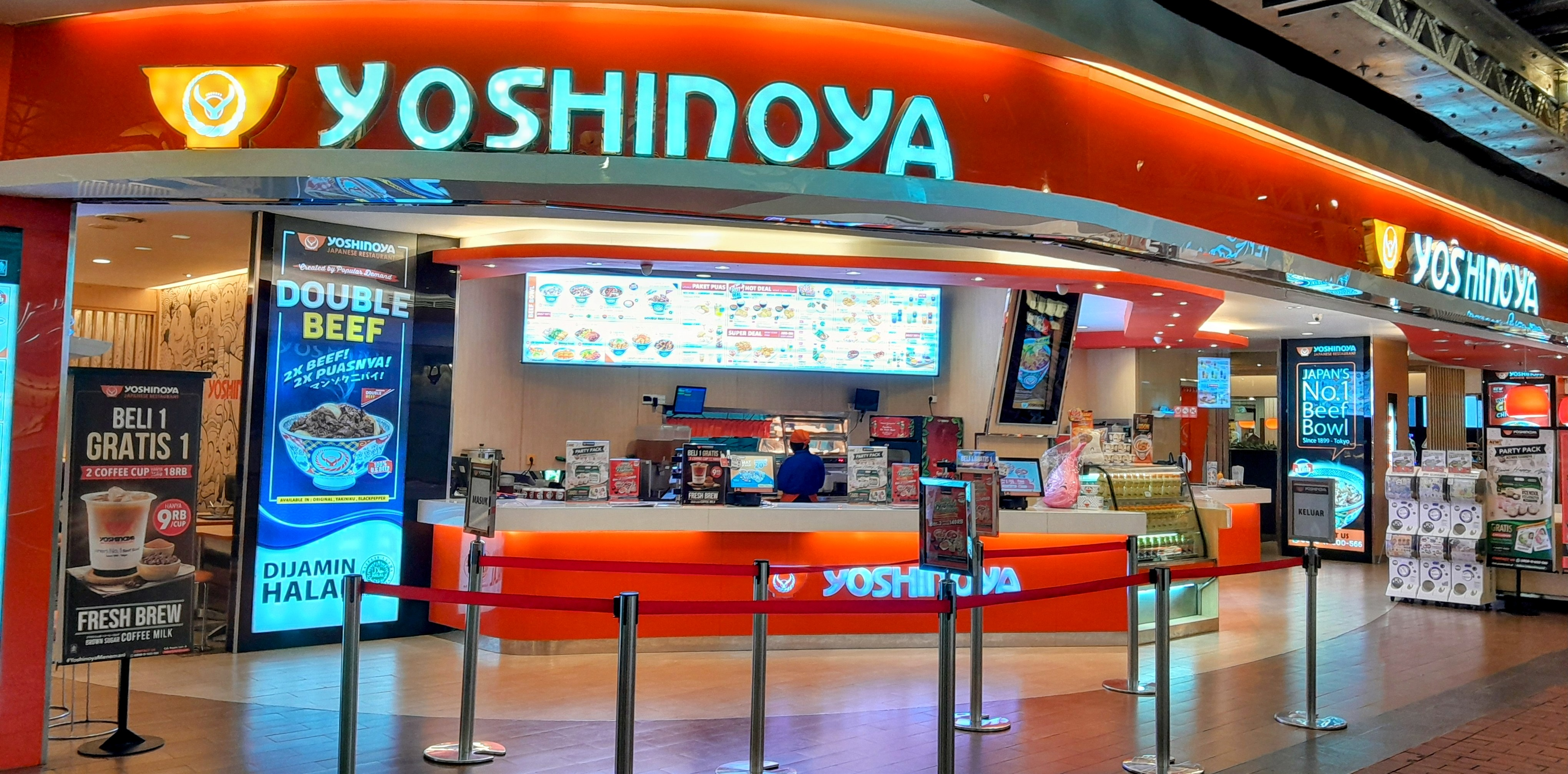
Yoshinoya restaurant at Grand Indonesia

In October 1993, Yoshinoya signed a franchise contract with a leading Indonesian company. The first Indonesian branch opened at Pondok Indah Mall, South Jakarta. However, it operated until July 1998.

In 2009, Yoshinoya re-entered the Indonesian market through another franchise agreement, this time with Multirasa Nusantara Co., Ltd. In October 2010, its first branch since re-entry opened at Grand Indonesia Shopping Town, Central Jakarta. As of November 2024, there are 169 Yoshinoya stores in Indonesia in 27 cities across the country other than the Greater Jakarta Metropolitan Area except in Papua.

=== Singapore ===
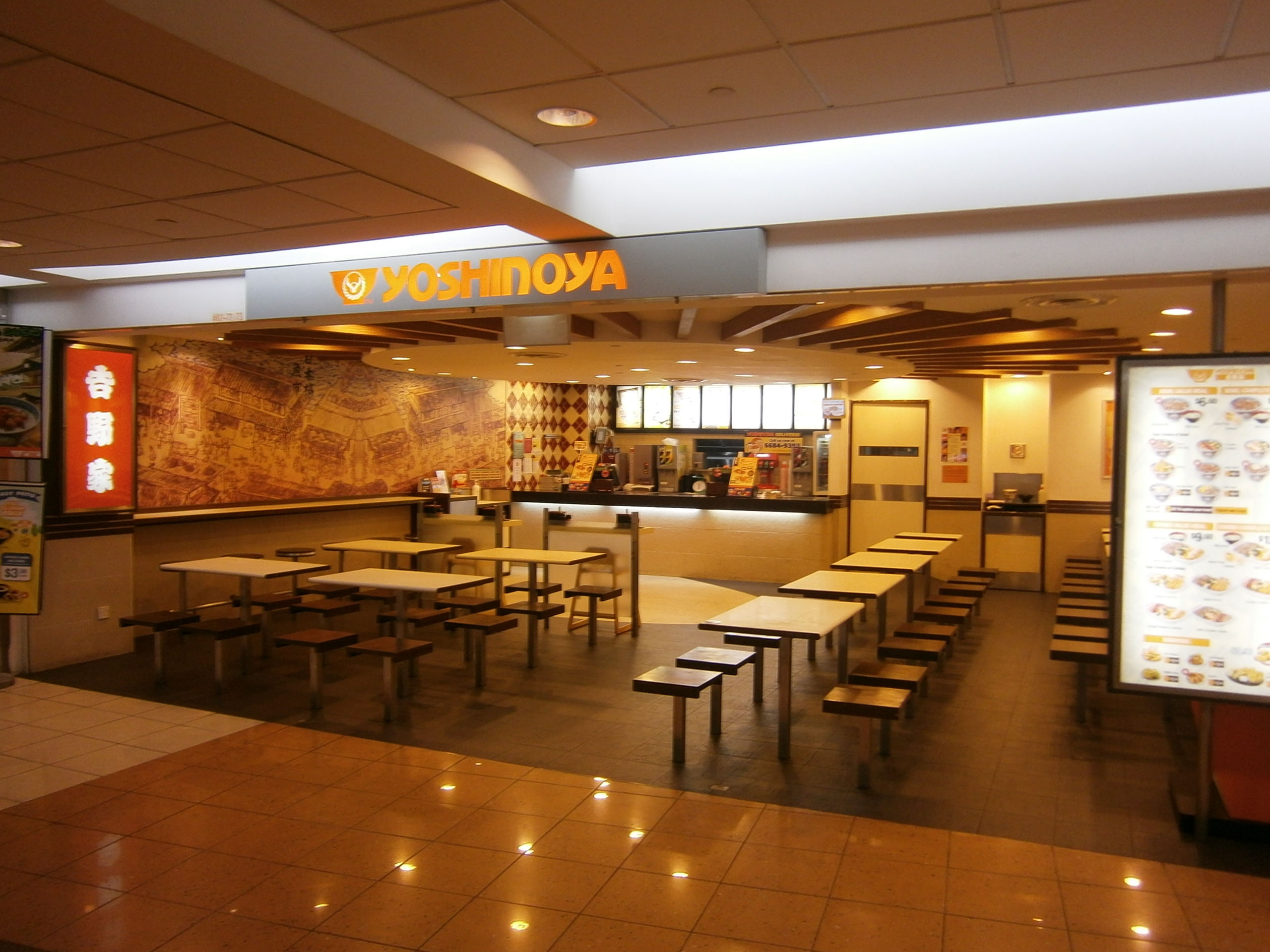
Yoshinoya in Singapore

In 1997, Yoshinoya entered the Singaporean market through a franchise agreement with Wing Tai Investment & Development Pte. Ltd. In the same year, it opened its first two branches; the first is located at Ngee Ann City (opened in September) and the second one is at Scott's Picnic. In 2016, Wing Tai sold the whole shares of the Singaporean franchise to Asia Yoshinoya International Sdn. Bhd. to make it as a subsidiary. As of 2023, there are 11 Yoshinoya stores in Singapore.

=== Cambodia ===
In 2013, the first Yoshinoya franchise in Cambodia opened on King's Road in Siem Reap with a franchise agreement signed with Meas Development Co., Ltd.

There are currently around two Yoshinoya stores in Cambodia as of September 2022, with both of them being located in Phnom Penh International Airport and Siem Reap International Airport.

=== Malaysia ===
In January 2004, the first and second Yoshinoya stores were opened in Malaysia in Mid Valley Megamall and 1 Utama, with all franchise agreements for Malaysia being terminated in Malaysia and stores permanently closing in 2009.

In 2015, Yoshinoya returned under a partnership with Texchem Resources and reopened its Mid Valley Megamall branch, combining with Hanamaru Udon, before more branches opened in other malls, such as Sunway Pyramid and IOI City Mall, after that. In 2020, Yoshinoya announced global store reductions due to the COVID-19 pandemic, including in Malaysia, reducing the number of outlets to just three. In April 2021, the AEON Mall Shah Alam branch permanently closed as part of the downsizing, and the Mid Valley Megamall branch permanently closed in June 2021, marking Yoshinoya's complete exit from Malaysia.

== Impact of BSE ==
In late 2001, a domestic bovine spongiform encephalopathy (BSE) incident critically damaged beef bowl sales. In late 2003, Japan suspended imports of American beef due to a BSE incident in Washington, cutting off Yoshinoya's main source of short plate (fatty beef) that is the main component of its beef bowl. This forced Yoshinoya to terminate beef bowl sales in Japan for the first time in its history on February 11, 2004.

News of the removal of this item from Yoshinoya's menu caused its fans and non-fans alike to queue in massive lines at its restaurants all around Japan to taste what might be their last beef bowl for a long time. Yoshinoya then switched to serving pork bowl (butadon) instead of beef. However, its restaurants in the United States continued to serve the beef bowl using American short plate. From December 2, 2004, restaurants in Japan started serving "beef yakiniku bowls" (牛焼肉丼, gyū-yakiniku-don), which use Australian beef, a different sauce, and additional vegetables. These bowls differed from original "beef bowls", which use American beef.

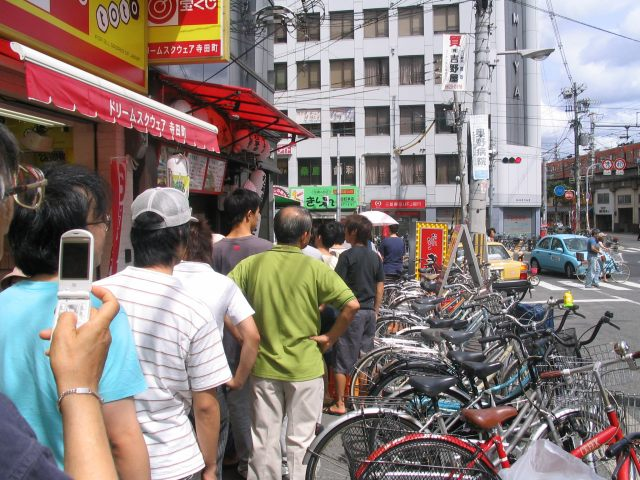
People lining up on the day of "the beef bowl revival festival" (牛丼復活祭) in 2006, near Teradachō Station, Osaka

In December 2005, Japan agreed to remove the restriction on importing beef from the United States. A letter to customers was then put up in restaurants, promising that the beef bowl would return in a few months. In January 2006, imports stopped again because inspectors found banned cattle parts in a veal shipment from the United States. In June 2006, Japan lifted the ban on imports again, and on July 31, 2006, Yoshinoya reposted the letter promising to resume serving the beef bowl in about two months.

On September 18, 2006, Yoshinoya brought back their beef bowl for one day as "the beef bowl revival festival" (牛丼復活祭, gyūdon fukkatsusai). This "revival", however, meant that its beef bowls would be available only the first five days of the month in October and November. On December 1, 2006, they began serving beef bowls daily, albeit at limited hours. These hours were extended once during special campaigns in February and December 2007. By March 17, 2008, Yoshinoya announced that they would resume 24-hour sales of the beef bowl, rolling out through their then 1040 stores nationwide through March 20, 2008. An announcement of banned cattle products in a Californian beef import on April 21, 2008, did not halt the company's plans, as they felt they had enough stock from other sources to avoid a recall.

== Controversies ==
In August 2008, three Yoshinoya employees in Hong Kong including the store's manager were arrested after gang-raping another employee. Footage of the incident was uploaded to the internet.

In 2019, Yoshinoya outlets in Hong Kong were targeted to be boycotted and vandalized by anti-government protesters during 2019–20 Hong Kong protests. Hop Hing Group, based in Hong Kong, is the licensed franchise of Yoshinoya in the city and Mainland China (Beijing and the cities in Southeast China). Its CEO, Marvin Hung, was criticized by protesters for attending a rally for Hong Kong police organized by pro-Beijing camps.

Another major reason that caused the boycott of Yoshinoya is an advertisement posted on Facebook in July 2019. The advertisement featured a traditional Japanese food, chikuwa; in Cantonese, the word sounds similar to "dog that tears paper". As this advert was published after police removed messages on a Lennon Wall in Tai Po, the advertisement was then regarded as poking fun at the police. The staff from Social Strategy Hong Kong who helped create the advertisement was sacked afterwards. Hence, protestors thought that Yoshinoya was politically biased and suppressed freedom of speech. Citizens in support of the protests then started boycotting Yoshinoya.

On April 16, 2022, Yoshinoya managing director Masaaki Itō attracted controversy over his statements as an instructor during a Waseda University marketing course. During the first class while covering marketing strategies for young female consumers Itō reportedly described a "drug-addled virgins strategy" stating: "You have these women straight out of the countryside who don't know left or right, while they're virgins you get them hooked on gyudon like a methamphetamine addiction. Once a man starts paying for their expensive dinners they'll never eat with us again." Students' shocked reactions were uploaded to Facebook and attracted fierce criticism online. One user wrote "Let's deconstruct this remark – he showed contempt for women, young people, people from rural areas and his own company's products. In short, he pretty much insulted most of his company's customers." The course tuition reportedly cost 36,500 yen over 29 days. On April 18, 2022, Yoshinoya issued a public apology, calling Itō's statements "profoundly inappropriate". Itō joined the company in 2018, previously vice-president at Procter & Gamble. On April 19, 2022, the company announced Itō's dismissal, calling that his statements "could not be tolerated from the point of view of human rights and gender issues". The controversy led to Yoshinoya suspending an upcoming marketing campaign starring Nicole Fujita and rollout of a new product that took 10 years to develop.

== Gallery ==
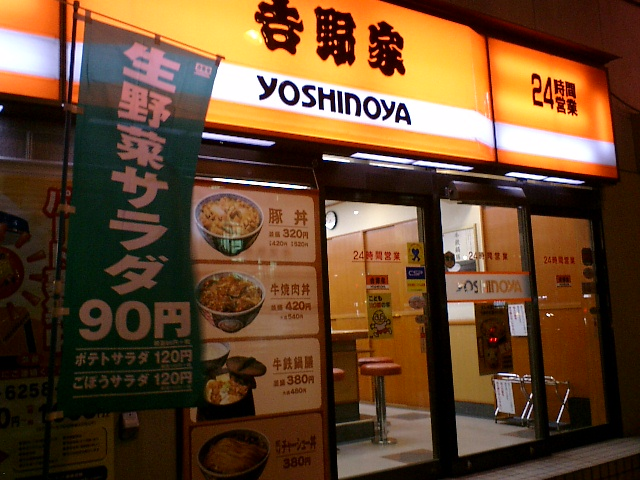
Yoshinoya restaurant at Nagahori, Osaka, in 2005

Yoshinoya restaurant in Teradachō, Osaka, on September 18, 2006

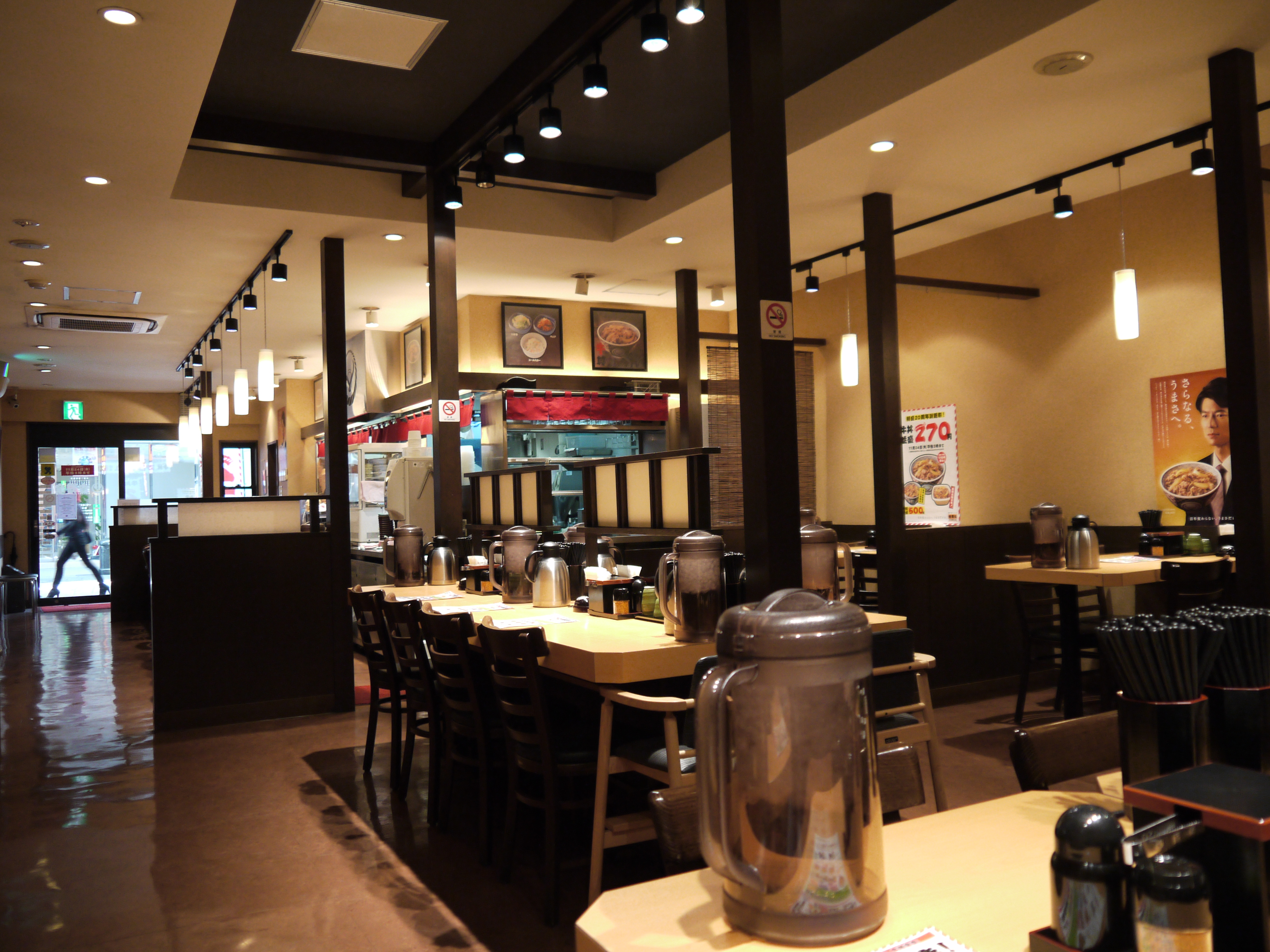
Inside Yoshinoya in Kumamoto city

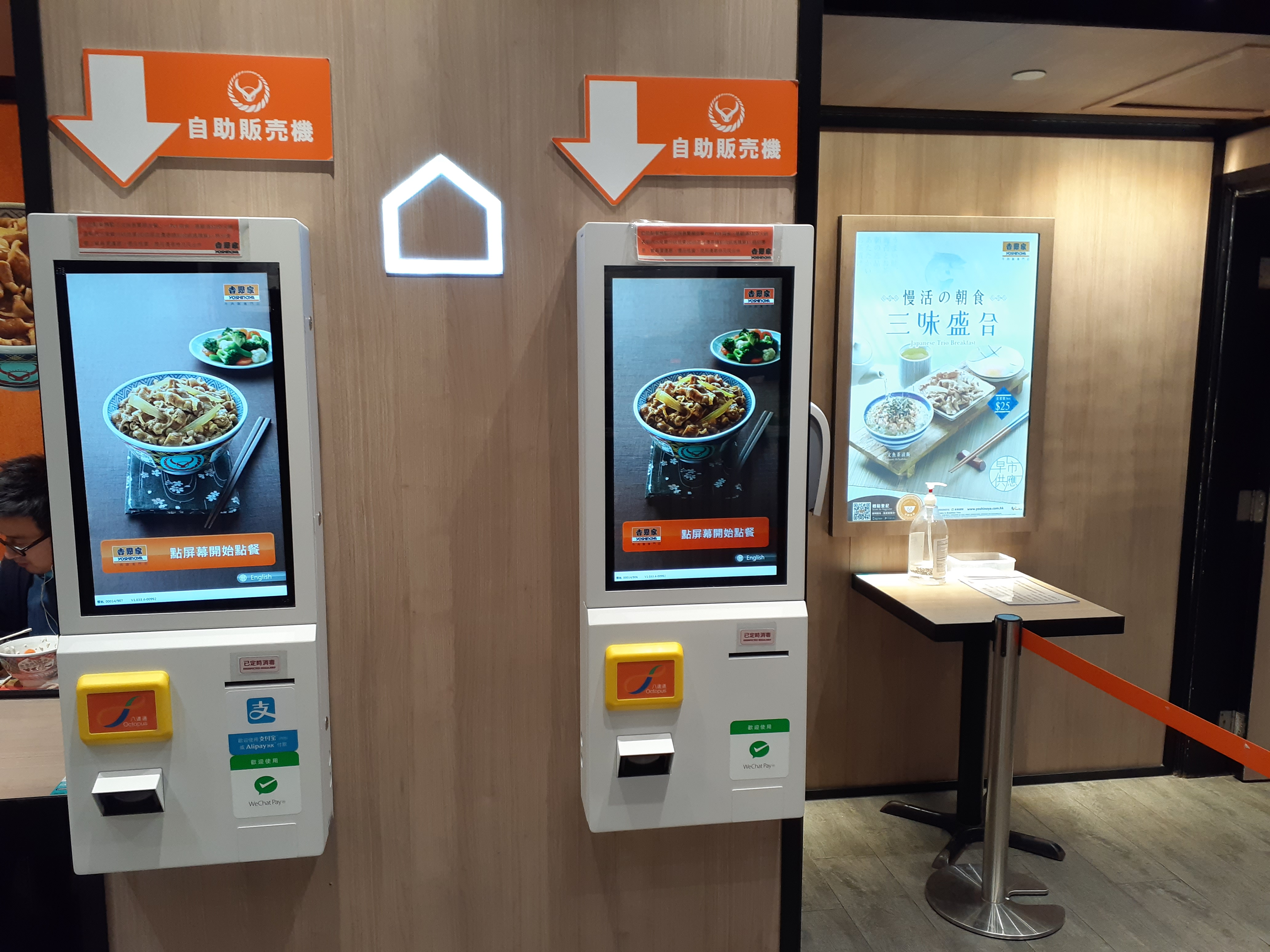
Yoshinoya self-ordering kiosks at Kyoto Plaza, Hong Kong

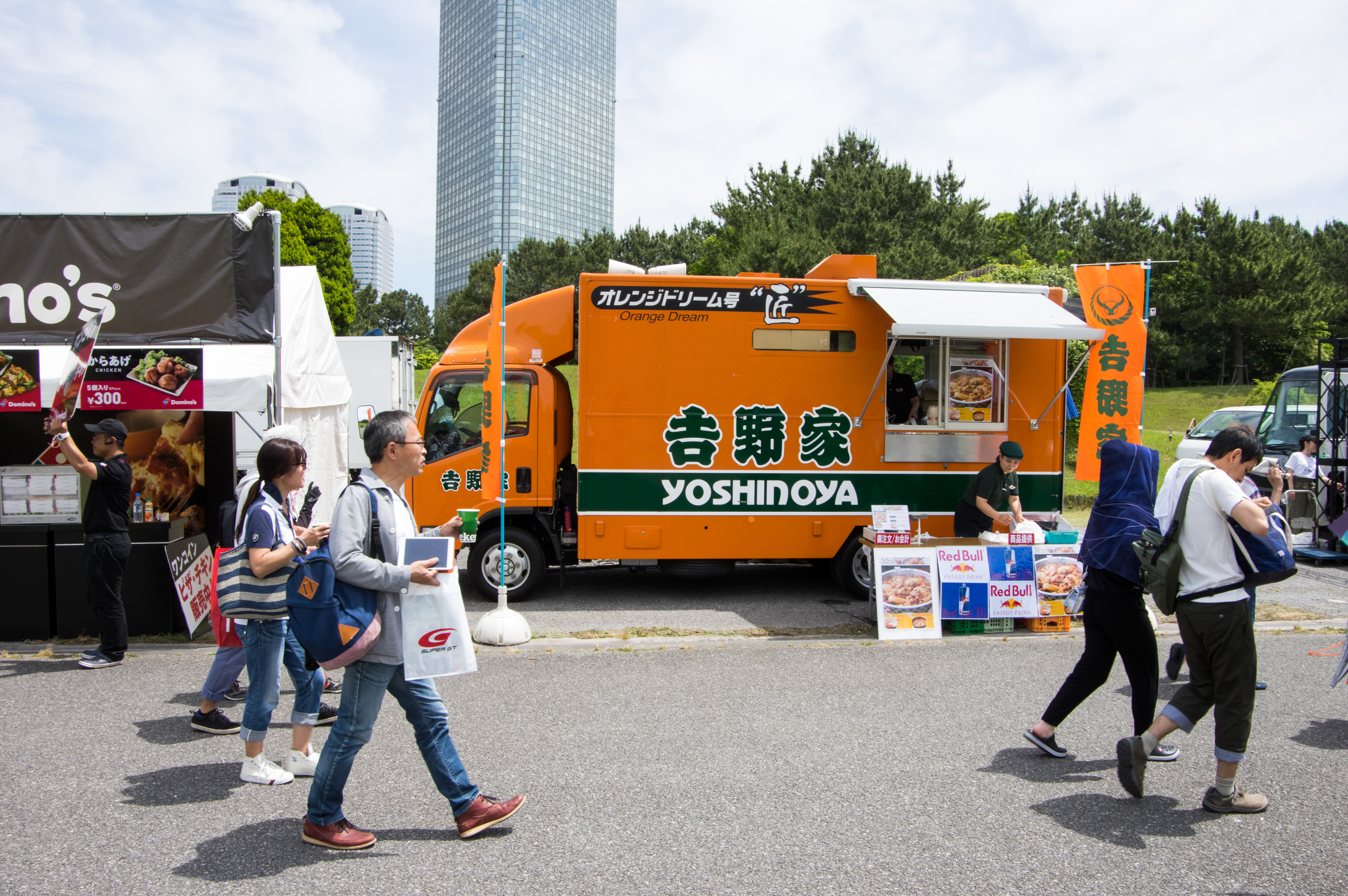
Yoshinoya food truck

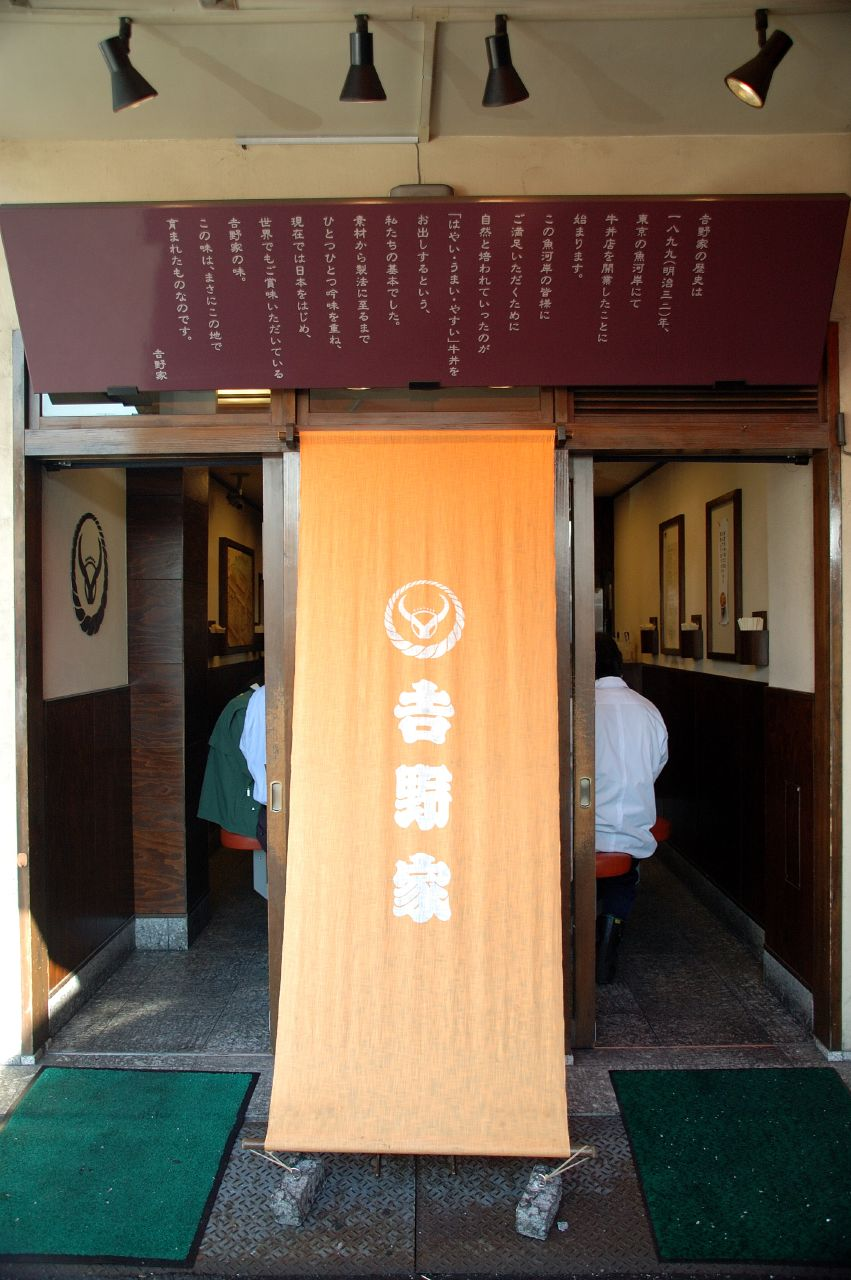
The flagship restaurant in Tsukiji fish market in Tokyo

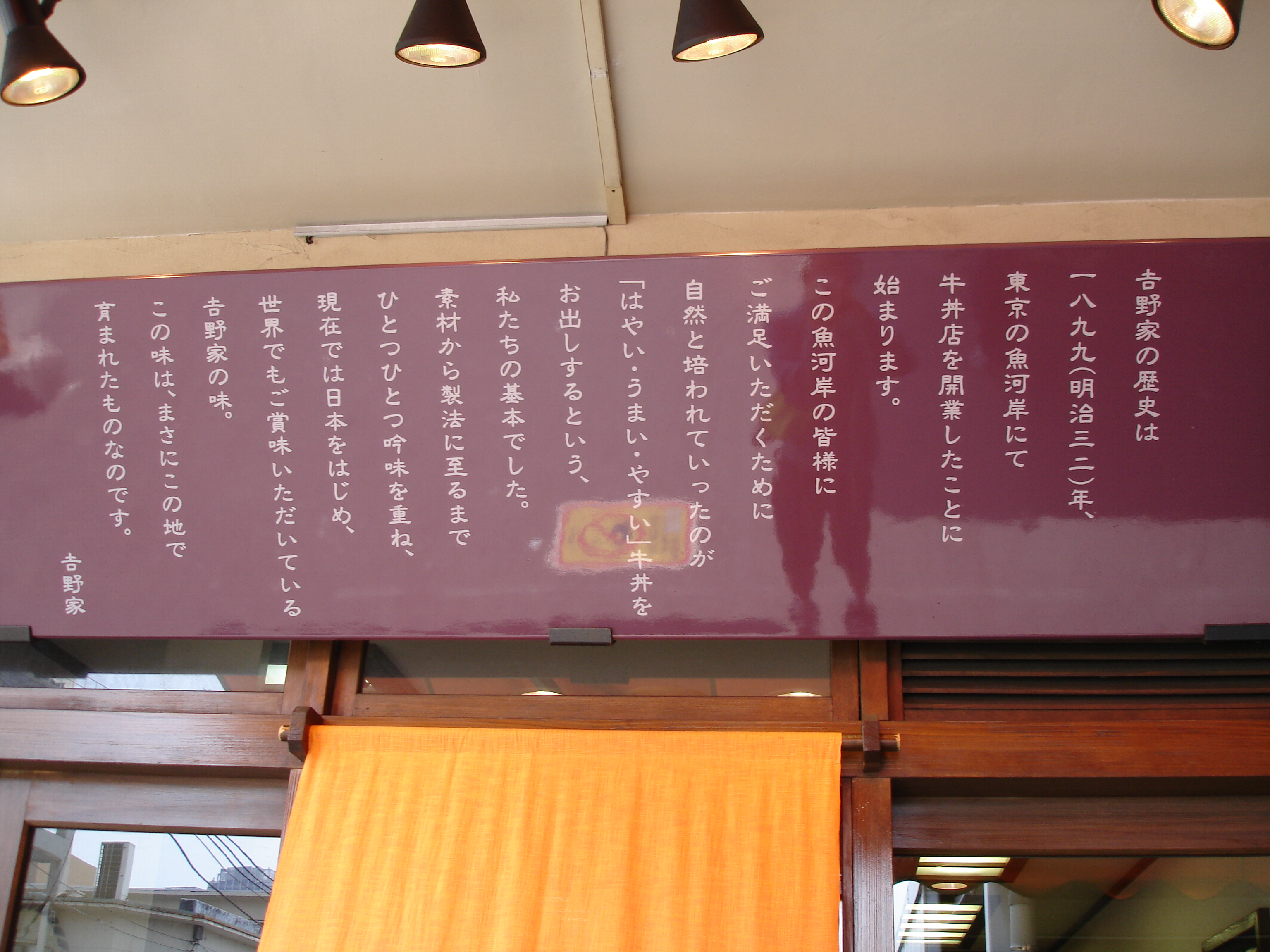
Greetings to customers at the flagship restaurant

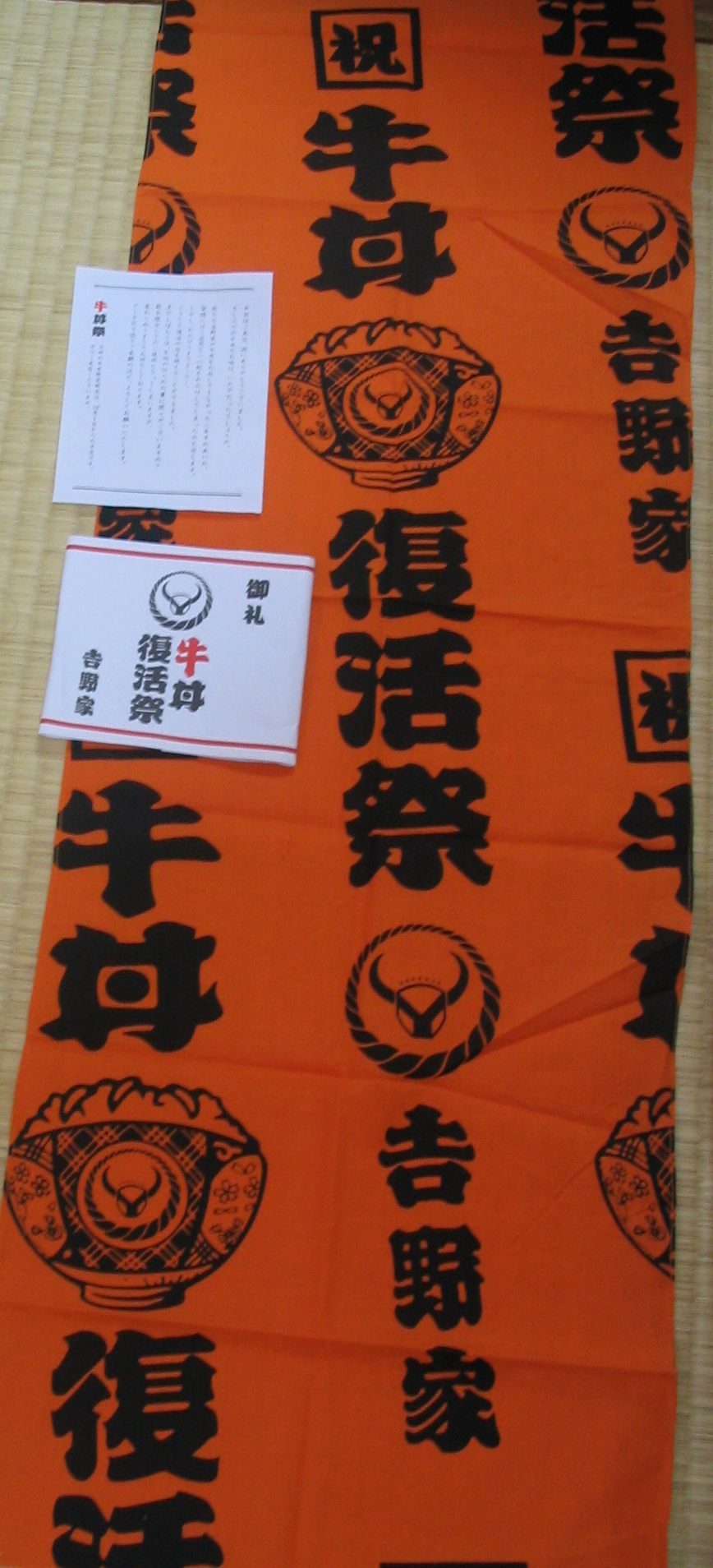
Free banner given to customers in "the beef bowl revival festival" on September 18, 2006

== See also ==
- List of Japanese restaurants
- Donburi
- Yakiniku
- Matsuya
- Sukiya
