= Zensho =

Restaurant holdings company

Zensho Holdings Co., Ltd.

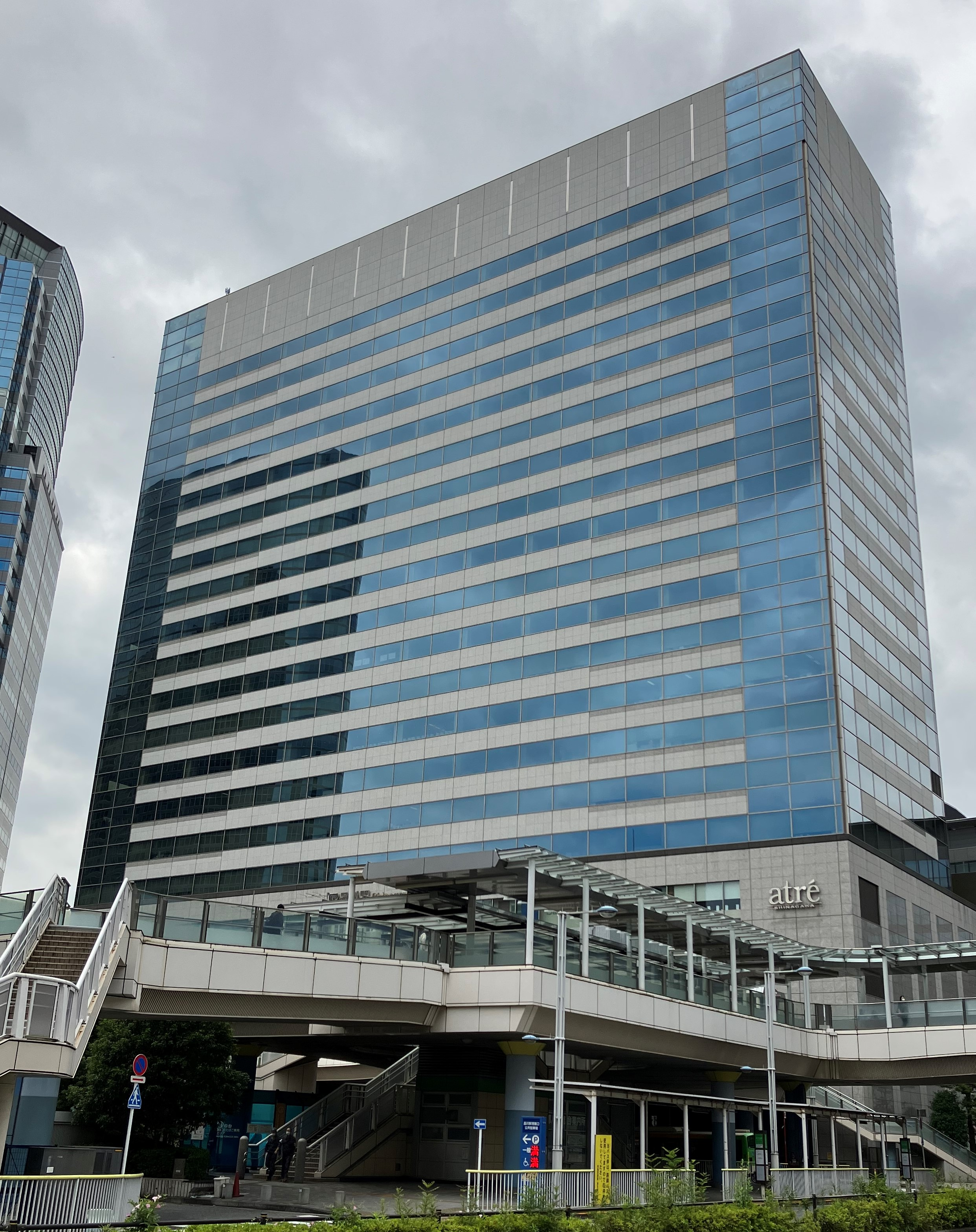
- Native name: 株式会社ゼンショーホールディングス
- Romanized name: Kabushiki-gaisha Zenshō Hōrudingusu
- Type: Public KK
- Traded as: TYO: 7550
- Industry: Restaurant chains
- Founded: 1982; 44 years ago
- Headquarters: Konan, Minato, Tokyo, Japan
- Website: www.zensho.co.jp

Zensho Holdings (株式会社ゼンショーホールディングス, Kabushiki-gaisha Zenshō Hōrudingusu) is a Japanese holding company which owns several restaurant chains in Japan. The largest is Sukiya serving gyūdon, rice bowls with beef.

== Restaurant chains ==
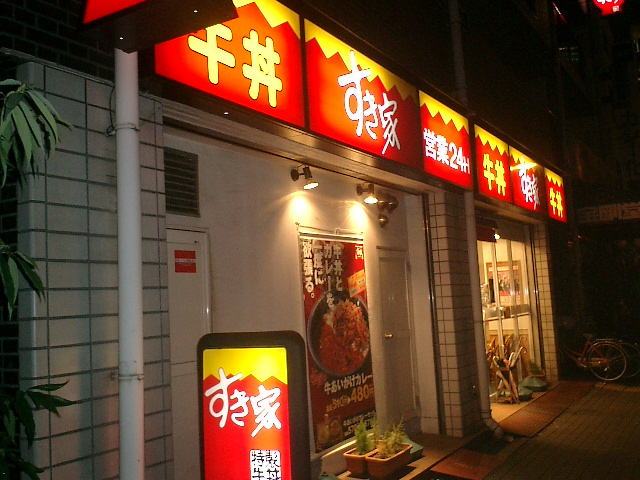
Exterior of a Sukiya restaurant.

The brands owned or licensed by Zensho include:

Gyūdon:

- Sukiya
- Nakau

Family restaurants:

- Coco's
- Big Boy
- El Torito
- Jolly Pasta
- Fracasso
- Hanaya Yohei
- The Chicken Rice Shop

Fast food:

- Kyubeiya
- Denmaru
- Hama Sushi
- Lotteria

Yakiniku:

- Gyuan
- Ichiban
- Takarajima

Snowfox Group:

- YO! Sushi
- SushiTake

Other:

- Chicago Pizza, Chicago Delita

=== Formerly owned chains ===
- Wendy's Japan (all outlets closed December 2009)

== Controversies ==
=== Unpaid labor cases ===
Zensho arranges franchises with an employee as a manager and part-time workers as staff. (internally referred to as 'crew') However, several Sukiya restaurants have been revealed to be managed by contract workers instead of full-time employees, a position that affords fewer protections and benefits.

In May 2006 a Shibuya Sukiya part-time worker alleged that Zensho refused to pay them for accrued overtime hours. After the issue was covered in parliament by MP Akira Koike Zensho withdrew the worker's dismissal and in December 2006 announced age increases for late shifts. However, Zensho did not respond to previous allegations of unpaid overtime labor or offer compensation.

On November 2007 3 Sukiya workers in Sendai city Izumi-ku lodged a complaint to the Labour Standards Inspection Office alledging 170,000 yen in unpaid overtime wages. After Zensho declined to negotiate in November 2006 the Shuto Seinen Union formed the "Sukiya Union." In 2009 Zensho accused one of the 3 workers in the suit for theft/fraud through "eating 5 bowls of rice without authorization at work and falsely claiming overtime." The accused stated that the allegations were "an act of intimidation and retaliation against the unpaid overtime pay trial. The case was elevated to the Tokyo District Court and was settled on December 21 2012. Zensho promised to "Apologize the dishonest attitude so far and respond to collective bargaining, pay the plaintiff and the labor union for the settlement fee, and do not treat the plaintiffs unfavorably because the plaintiff is a member of a labor union."

=== Robberies ===
A string of robberies in 2008 brought Sukiya to the top of industry percentages for crime. At its peak in 2011 Sukiya stores consisted of 90% of gyudon restaurant robberies. So-called robbery manuals were also circulated online, attracting media scrutiny. In an unusual move the National Police Agency and Aichi police department ordered Zensho to implement anti-crime measures such as emergency beacons at their franchises in 2010. Zensho alleged that sufficient measures were already taken, but in a follow-up June 2011 National Police Agency investigation the majority of stores had no implemented changes.

In response the National Police Agency Community Safety Bureau sent court orders for Zensho to make sufficient anti-crime measures on October 13 2011. In response Zensho pledged to eliminate stores staffed by one employee during late hours on March 2012. By December 2011 store managers were issued with emergency beacons hung around the neck.

=== Single-employee staffing ===
In March 2014 a string of Sukiya stores were reported to be temporarily closed owing to a staffing shortage and the February release of a labor-intensive dish, the beef hotpot teishoku. Many stores had been reliant on single-employee staffing during late hours, with a single worker cooking, working the register, and cleaning. Zensho pledged changes but single-employee staffing was eliminated only after the death of a Nagoya city Sukiya worker in January 2022.

=== Food poisoning ===
A 3-year old girl died in a food poisoning case after consuming potato salad from Delishasu, a store run by Densho subsidiary Fresh Corporation.
