= Sukiya =

Sukiya may refer to:

- Sukiya-zukuri, traditional Japanese interior
- a synonym for chashitsu, a Japanese tea room
- Sukiya (restaurant chain)
