= Sukiya (restaurant chain) =

Japanese gyūdon (beef bowl) restaurant chain

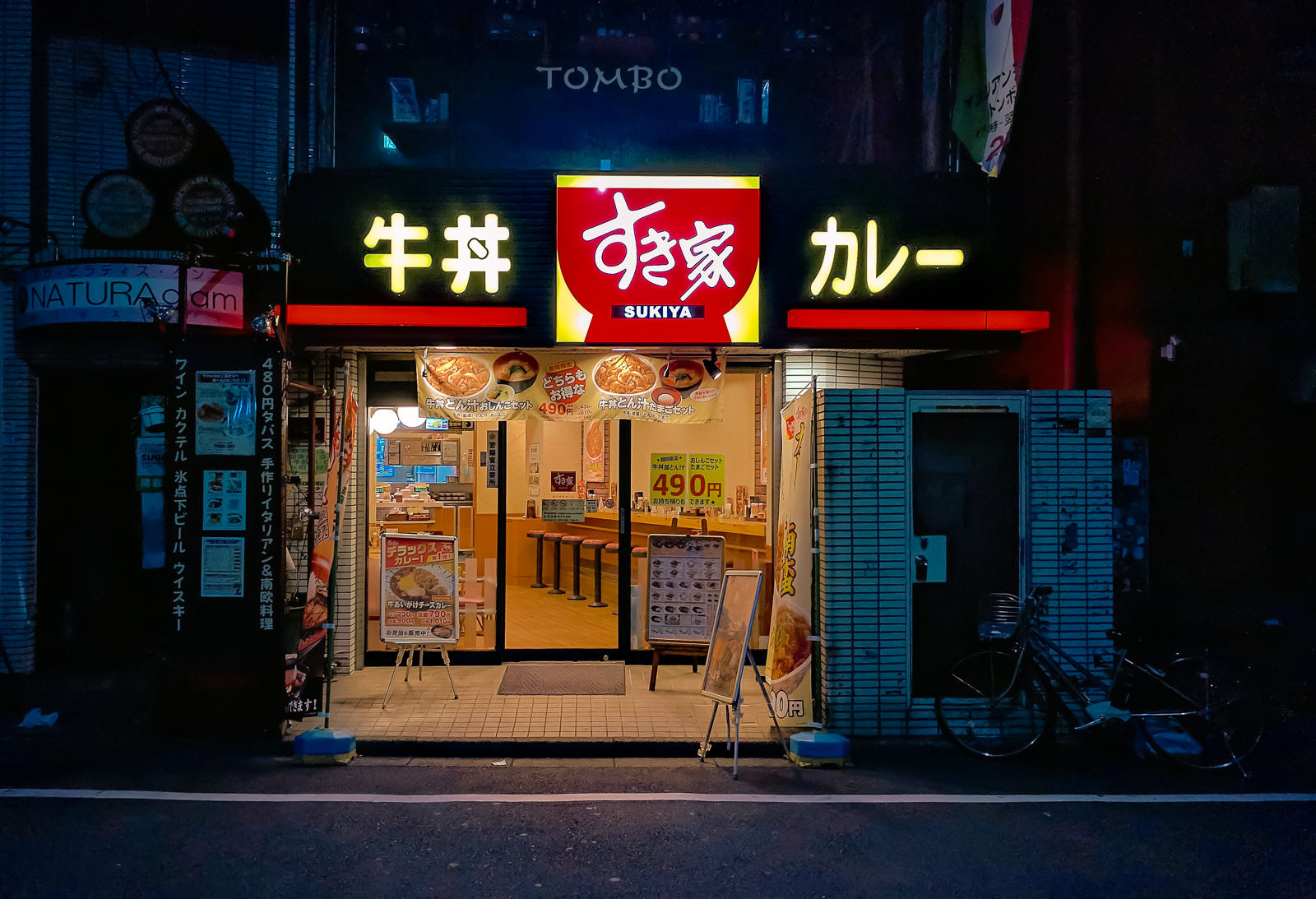
- Sukiya store in Tokyo, Japan
- Industry: Food and beverage
- Founded: 1982; 44 years ago
- Founder: Kentarō Ogawa
- Headquarters: Kōnan
- Area served: Japan, mainland China, Taiwan, Brazil, Mexico, Malaysia, Indonesia, Hong Kong, Singapore, Vietnam, Philippines, Thailand
- Products: Gyūdon, curry
- Parent: Zensho Holdings
- Website: sukiya.jp

Sukiya (すき家, stylized as SUKIYA) is a Japanese restaurant chain specializing in gyūdon (beef bowl). It is the largest gyūdon chain in Japan. It operates over 2,000 stores in Japan, and has branch stores across Asia. Sukiya's owner, Zensho Holdings, is listed on the Tokyo Stock Exchange and had sales of ¥511 billion in 2016.

Its slogan, printed in English outside the restaurant, is "Save Time and Money". Aside from beef bowls, Sukiya also offers curry, and a wide variety of other foods.

== History ==
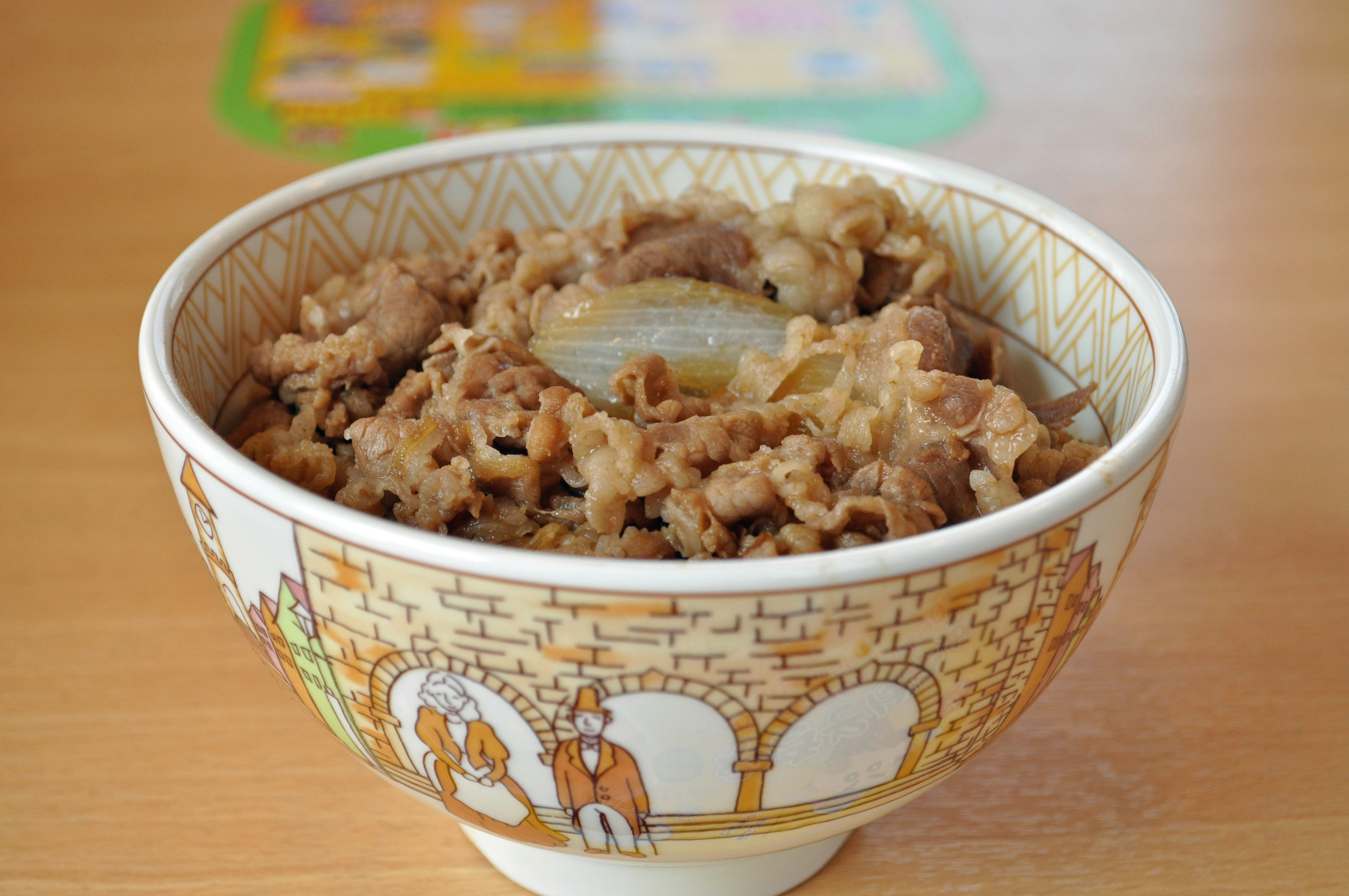
Gyūdon is Sukiya's main product

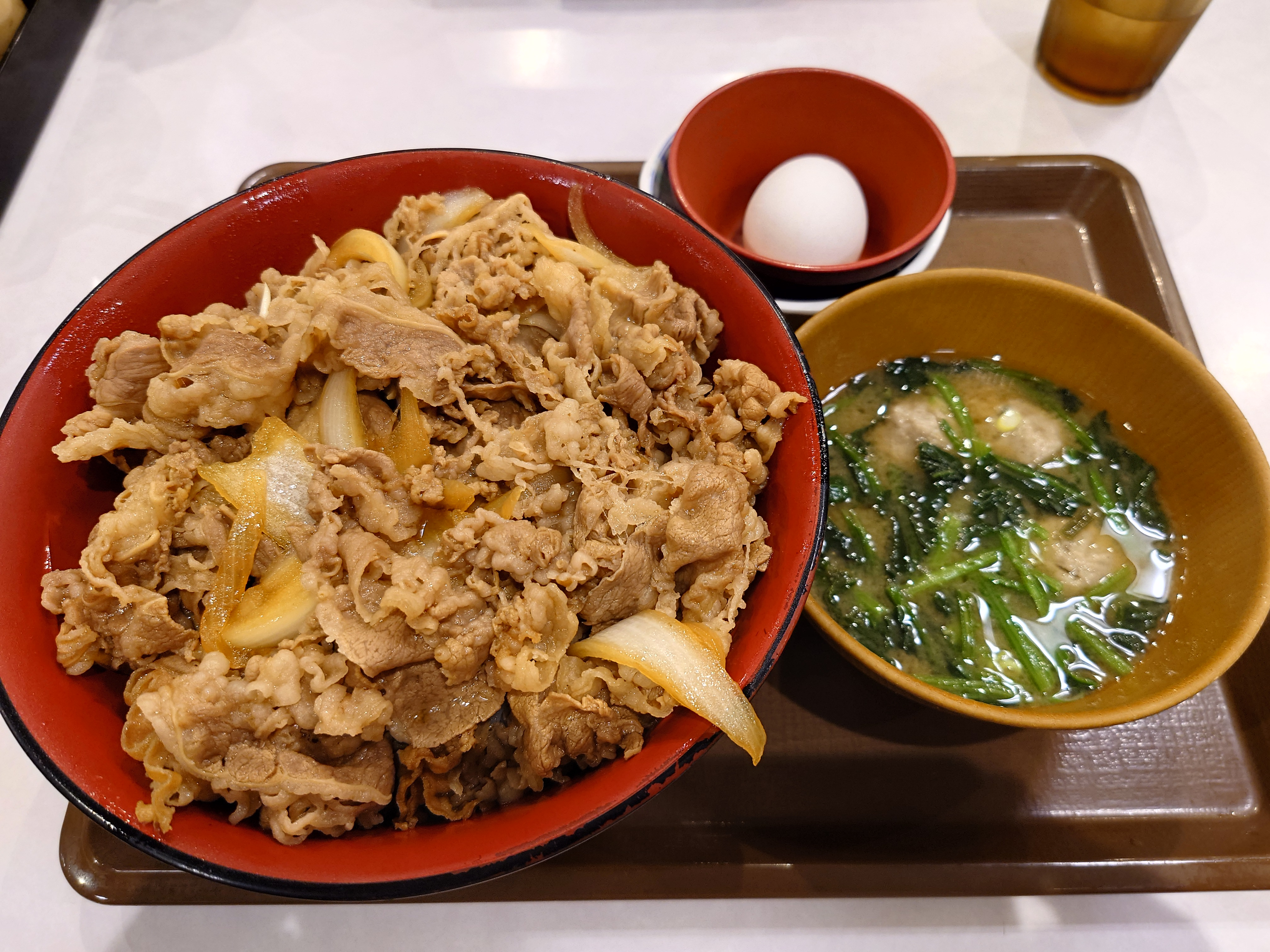
A typical gyūdon meal set, with miso soup

The first Sukiya opened in 1982 in Yokohama, Kanagawa Prefecture. It was founded by Kentarō Ogawa (小川賢太郎), who originally worked at Yoshinoya, another gyūdon restaurant. Ogawa also founded Zensho Holdings, which owns Sukiya.

Unlike its competitor Yoshinoya, Sukiya did not stop serving gyūdon during the 2004 ban on American beef imports, instead switching to beef imported from Australia. In response to Yoshinoya's butadon (pork bowl, a substitute for gyūdon), Sukiya began serving its own version, tondon.

On May 28, 2011, the first Sukiya restaurant was opened in Bangkok, Thailand.

On September 11, 2013, a Sukiya restaurant was opened in Mexico City, the first in Mexico. The Zona Rosa restaurant offers 24/7 service.

On July 3, 2014, a Sukiya restaurant was soft opened in Taipei, making it the first Sukiya in Taiwan.

On July 1, 2016, a Sukiya was opened in Ho Chi Minh City, Vietnam.

On March 31, 2025, Sukiya imposed a one-week closure of its 2,000 stores in Japan for cleanup after it was revealed that it served food contaminated with pests on two occasions, including a rat that had entered a refrigerator and was included in a miso soup served to a customer in Tottori and a cockroach that was discovered at one of its outlets in Tokyo.

== Locations ==
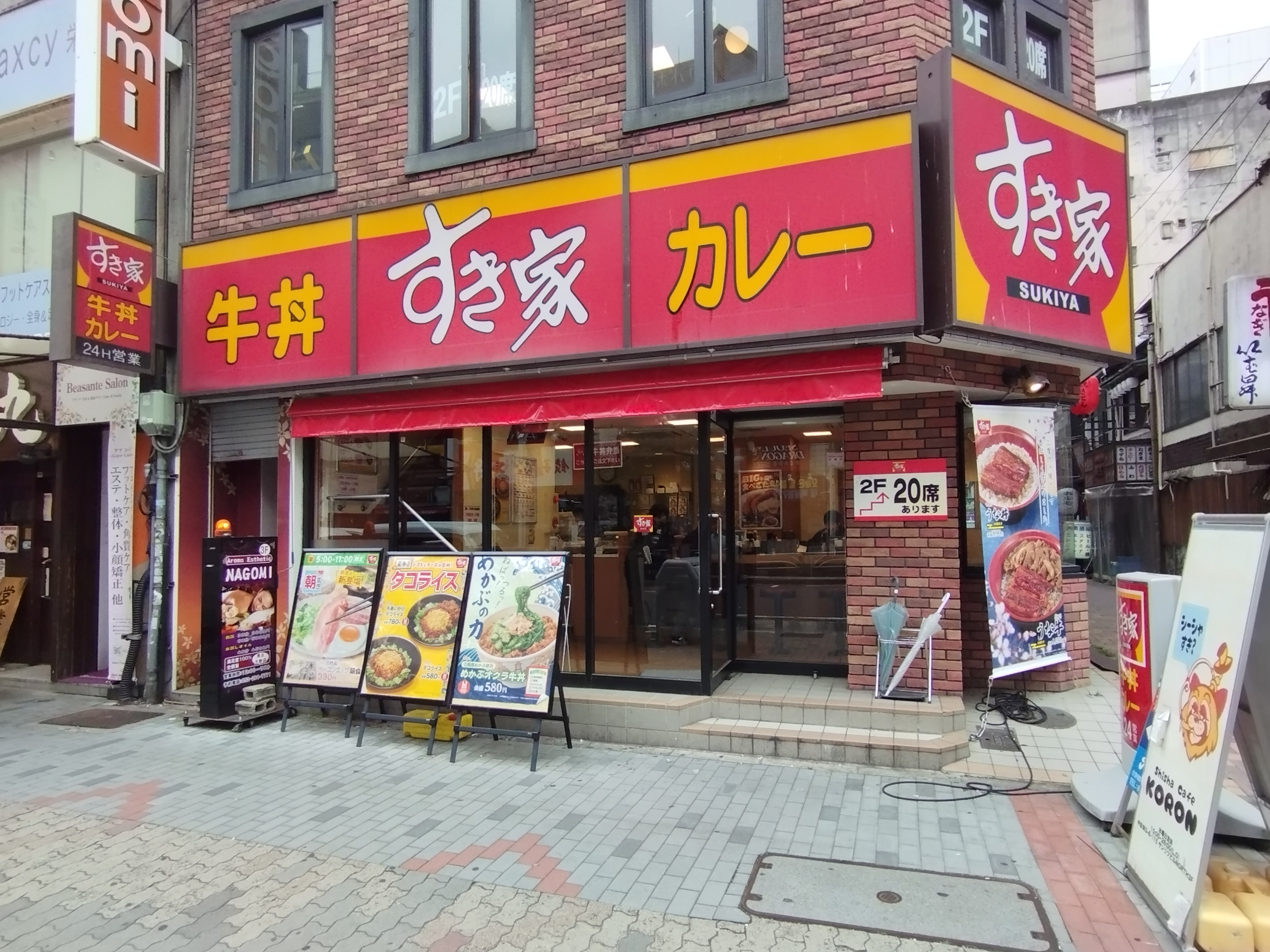
Sukiya store in Nagoya, Japan

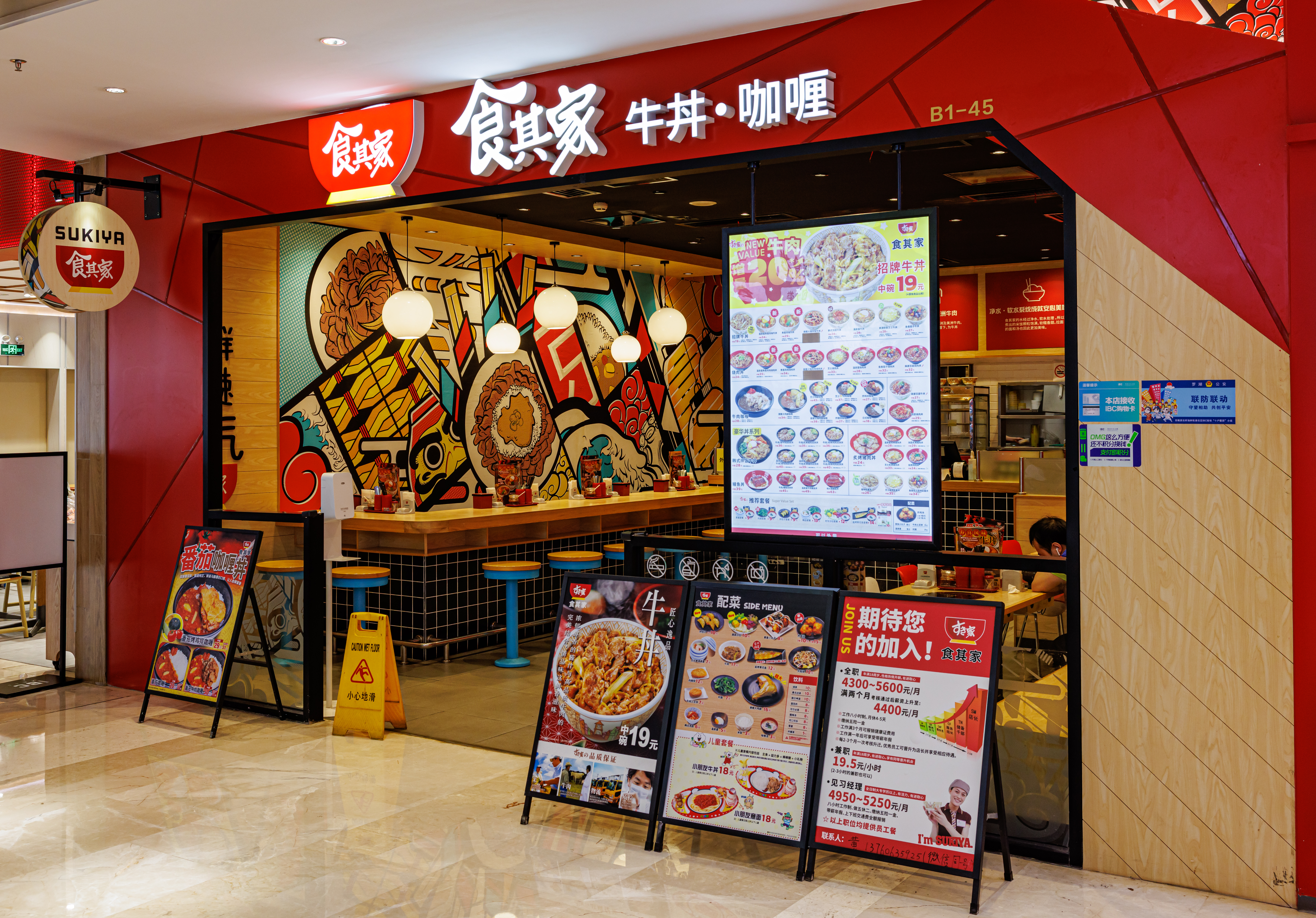
Sukiya store in Shenzhen, China

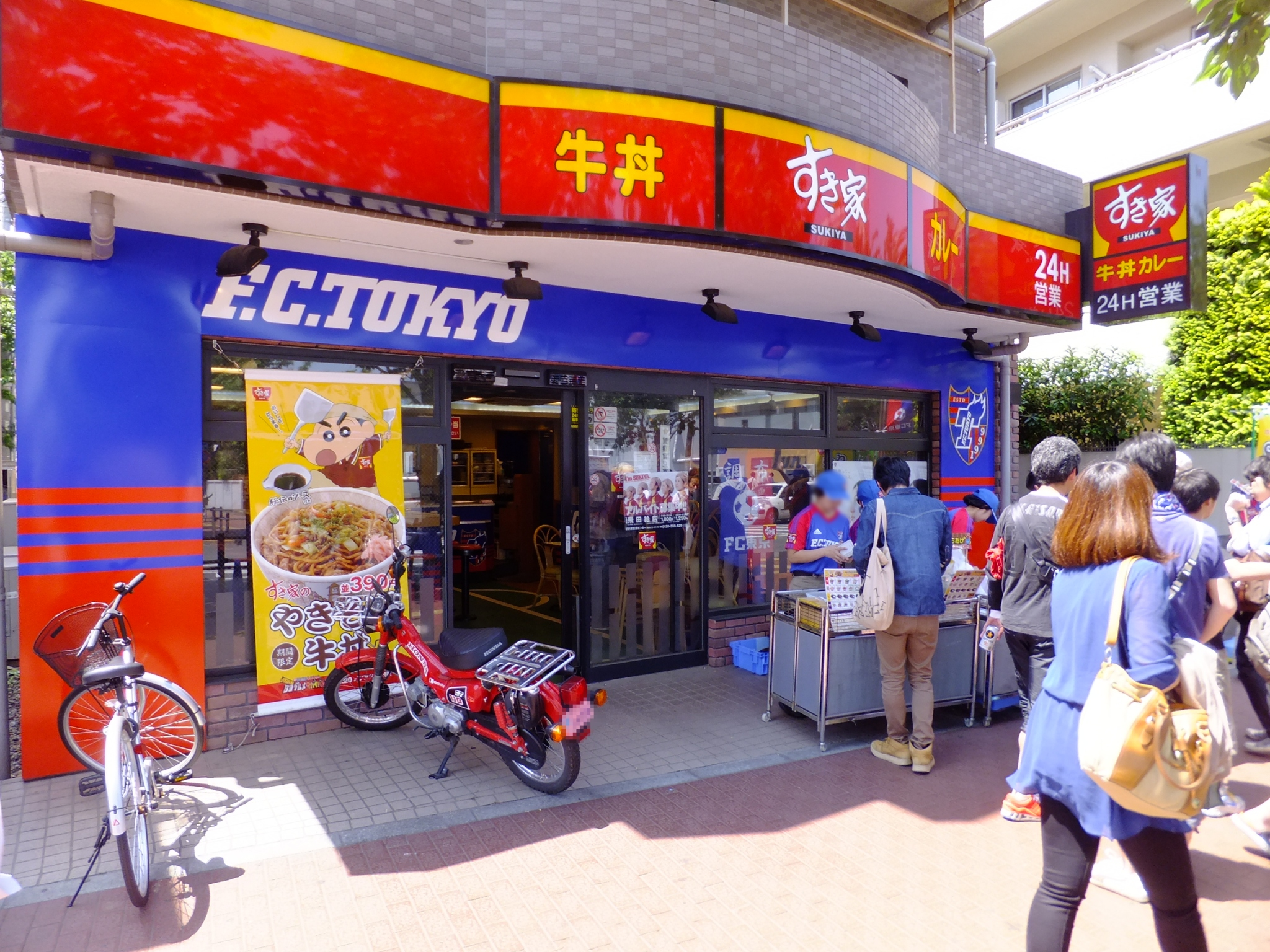
Sukiya store in Tokyo, Japan

Location	Count	Notes
Japan	2,333	Locations in all 47 prefectures of Japan as of 2017
Mainland China	296	As of 2014, about half of the locations are in Shanghai
Taiwan	66	28 in Taipei, 17 in New Taipei, 9 in Taichung, 8 in Taoyuan, 3 in Hsinchu, and 1 in Keelung.
Brazil	29	24 in São Paulo, 1 in Mogi das Cruzes, 1 in Santo André, 1 in São Bernardo do Campo, 1 in São José dos Campos, 1 in Guarulhos, 1 in Sorocaba
Mexico	22	18 in Mexico City, 2 in Toluca, and 2 in Querétaro
Thailand	39	21 in Bangkok, 8 in Chonburi, 4 in Nonthaburi, 2 in Rayong, 1 in Ayutthaya, 1 in Nakhon Pathom, 1 in Nakhon Ratchasima, 1 in Pathum Thani, and 1 in Khon Kaen.
Malaysia	18	6 in Kuala Lumpur, 5 in Selangor, 3 in Johor Bahru, 2 in Melaka, 1 in Putrajaya, 1 in Kedah.
Indonesia	13	8 in Jakarta, 2 in Tangerang, 1 in South Tangerang, and 1 in Depok.
Hong Kong	26	4 in Yau Tsim Mong, 4 in Sai Kung, 3 in Sha Tin, 2 in Tsuen Wan, 1 in Wan Chai, 1 in Eastern District, 1 in Kowloon City, 1 in Wong Tai Sin, 1 in Kwun Tong, 1 in Kwai Tsing, 1 in Tai Po
Singapore	32	11 in Central Region, 9 in North-East Region, 5 in West Region, 5 in East Region, 2 in North Region
Vietnam	18	18 in Ho Chi Minh City.
Philippines	10	2 in Quezon City, 1 in Mandaluyong, 1 in Manila, 1 in Muntinlupa, 1 in Pasig, 1 in Las Piñas, 1 in Dasmariñas, 1 in Tanza, 1 in Marilao

== Gallery ==
=== Gyūdon ===
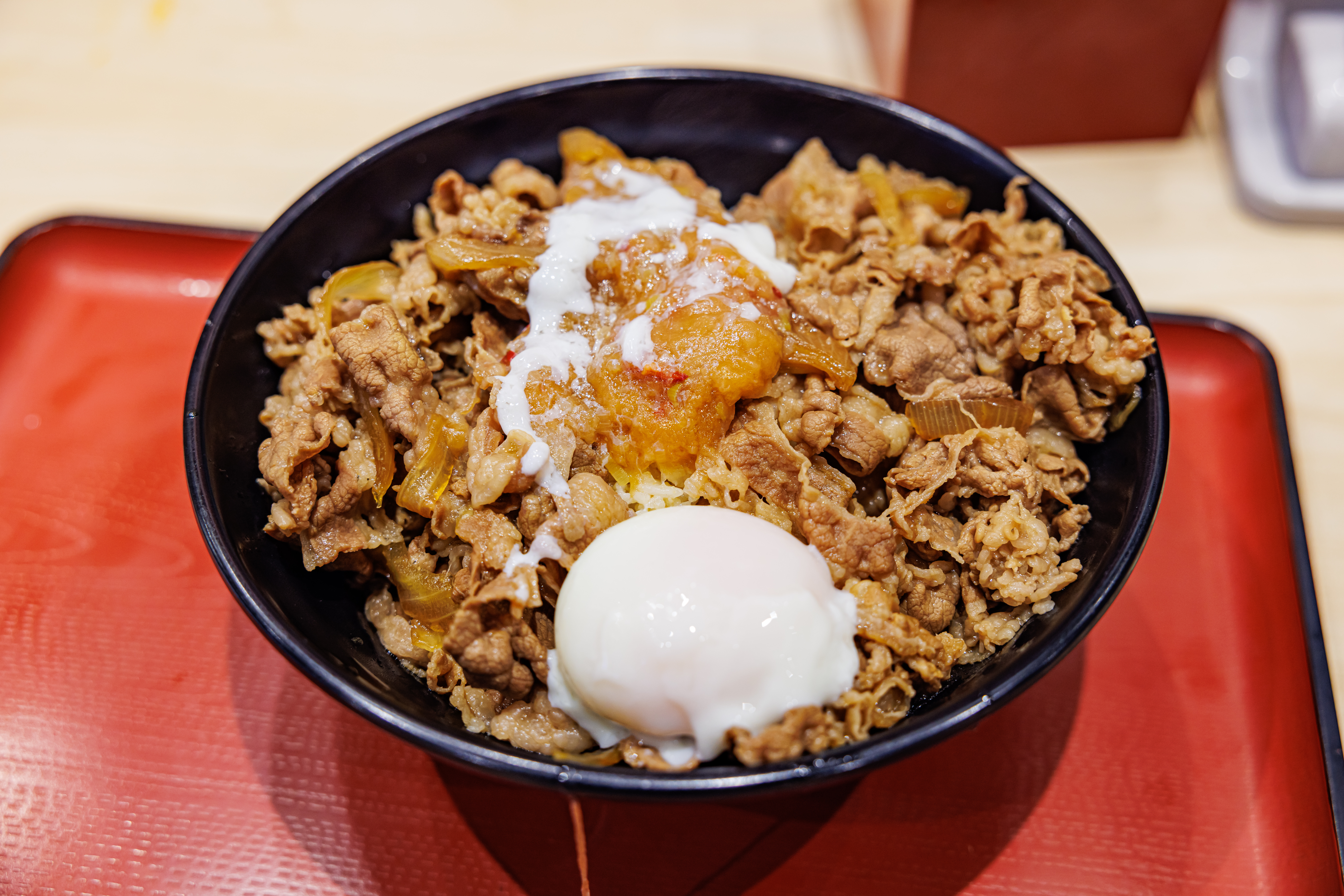
With poached egg

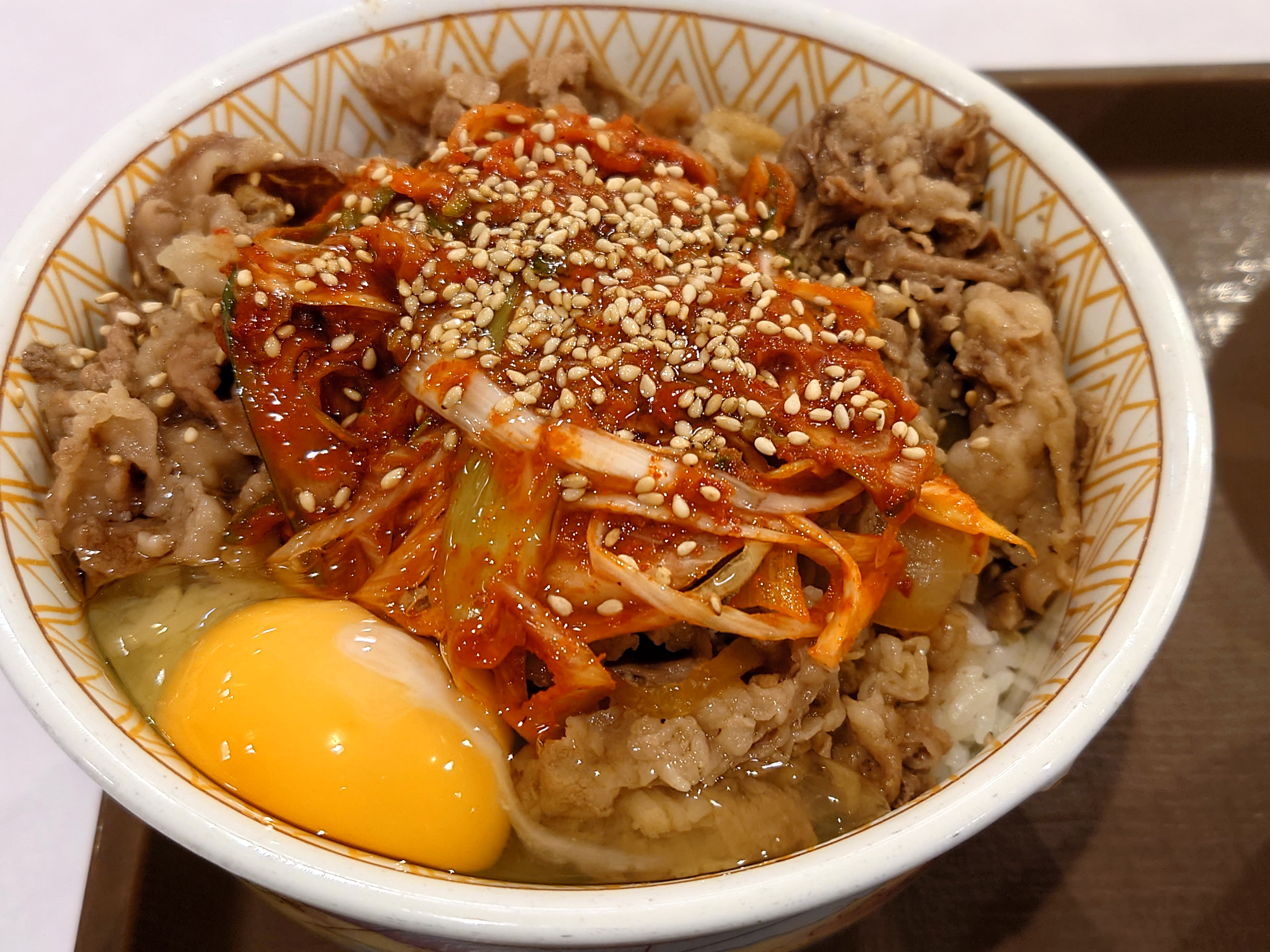
With kimchi and raw egg

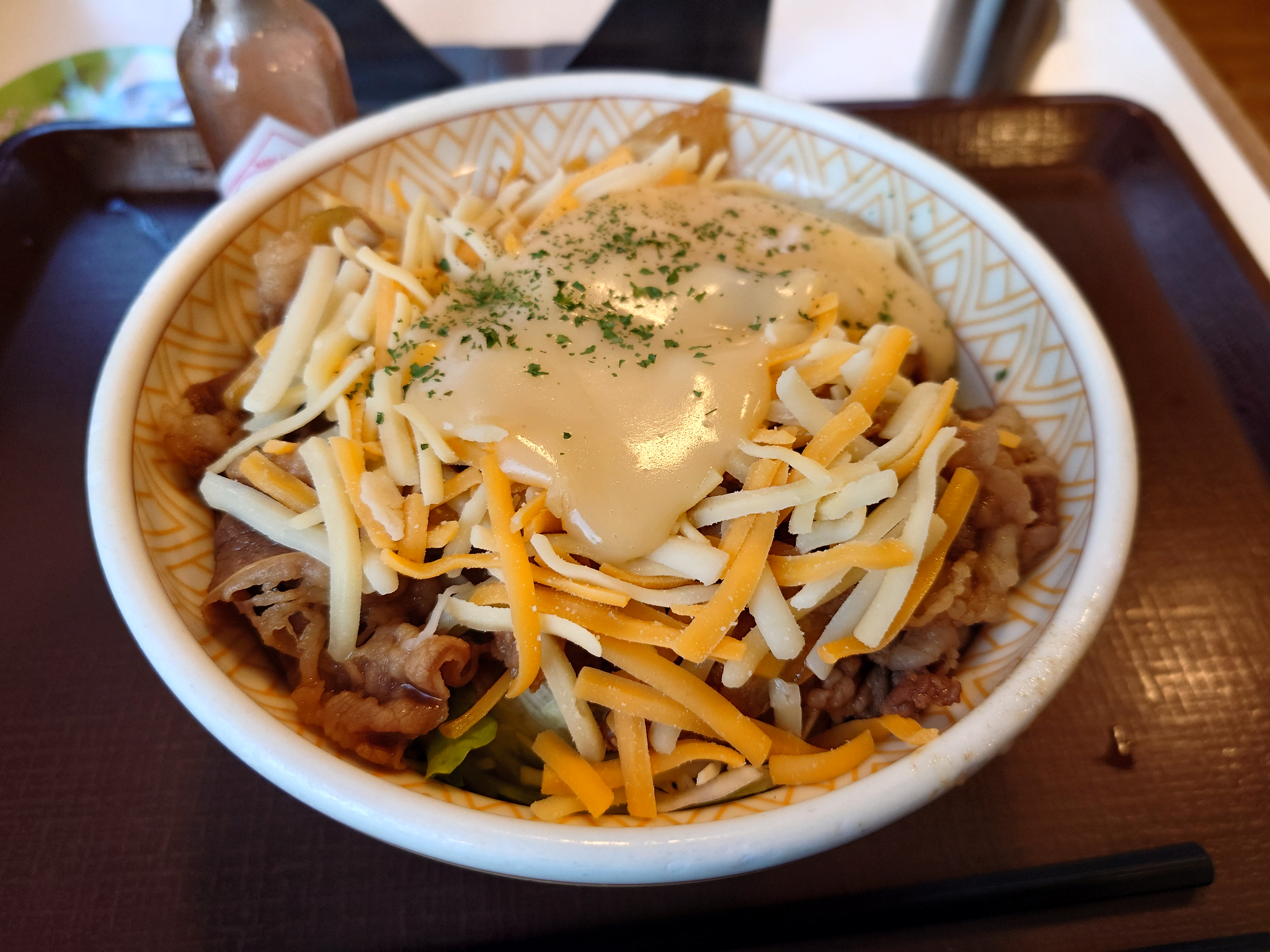
With cheese

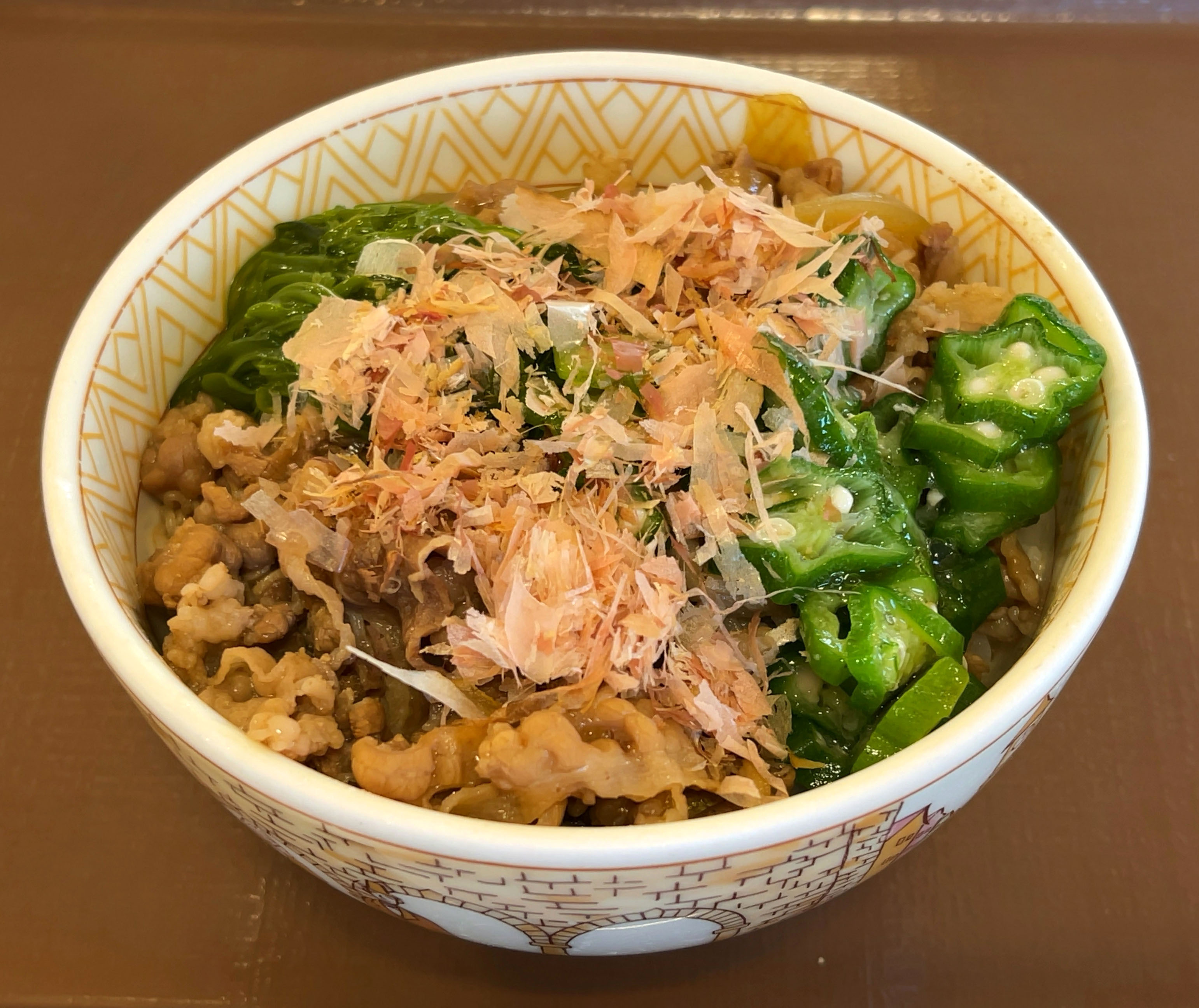
With okra and katsuobushi

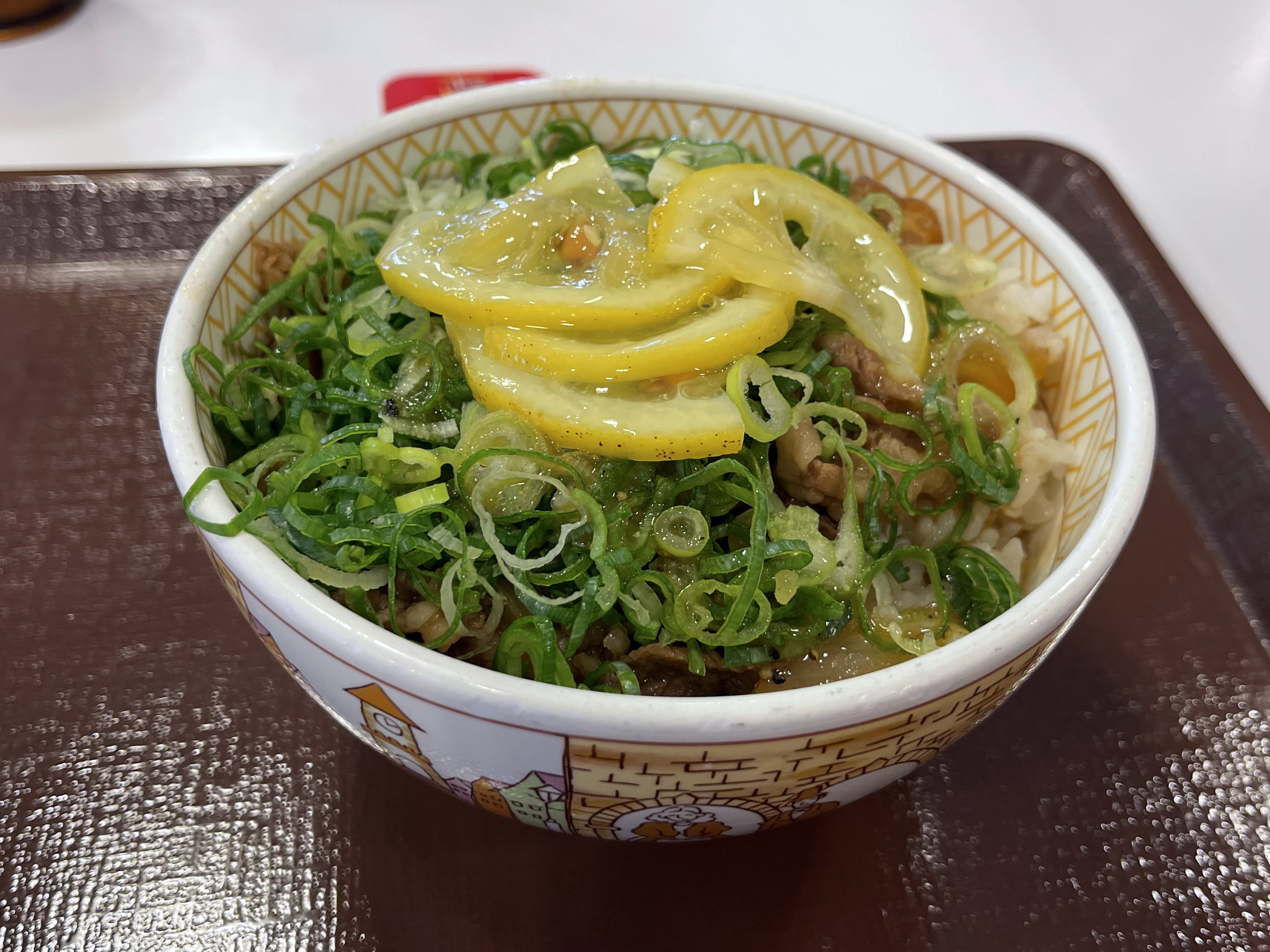
With negi and lemon

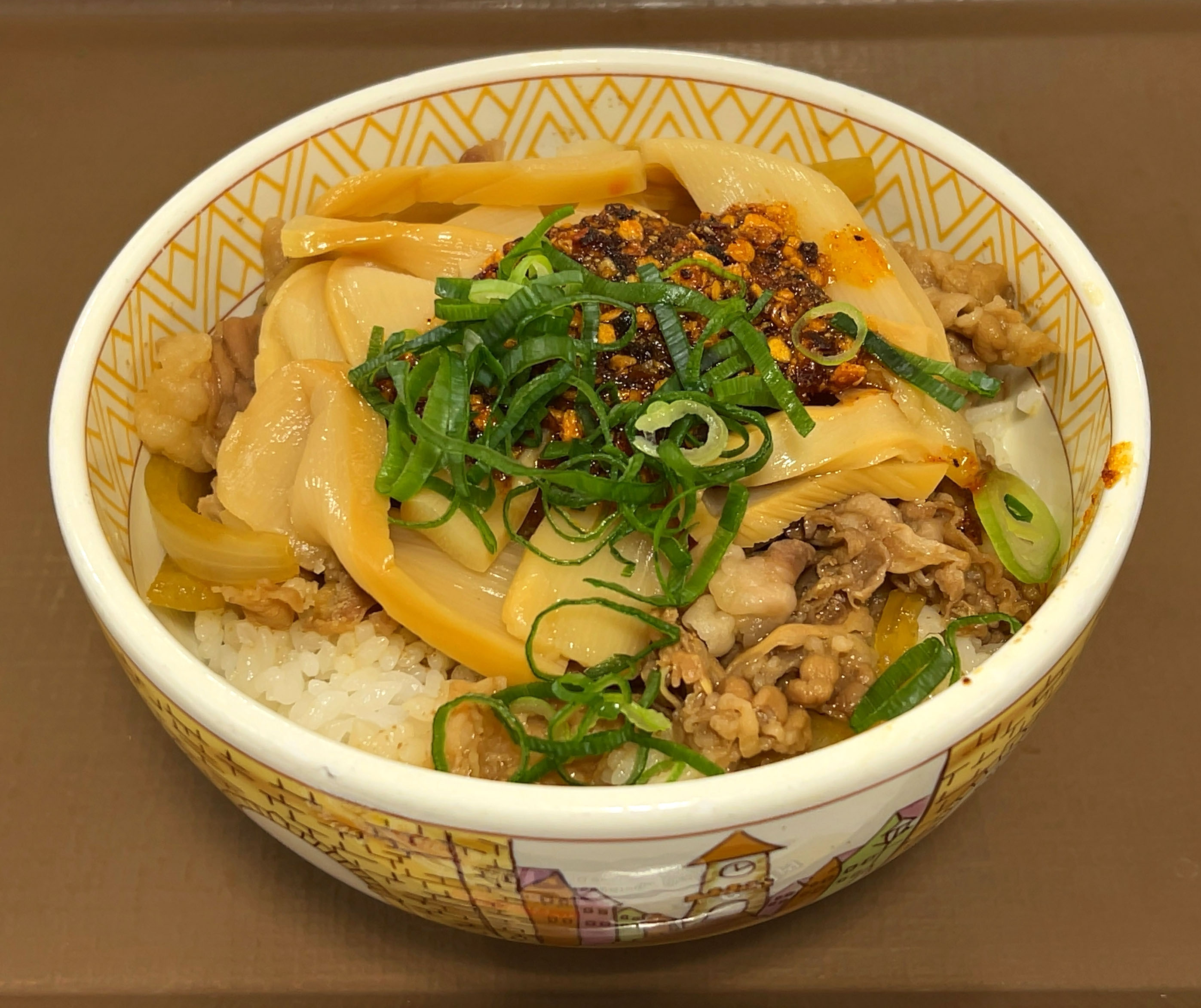
With menma and chili oil

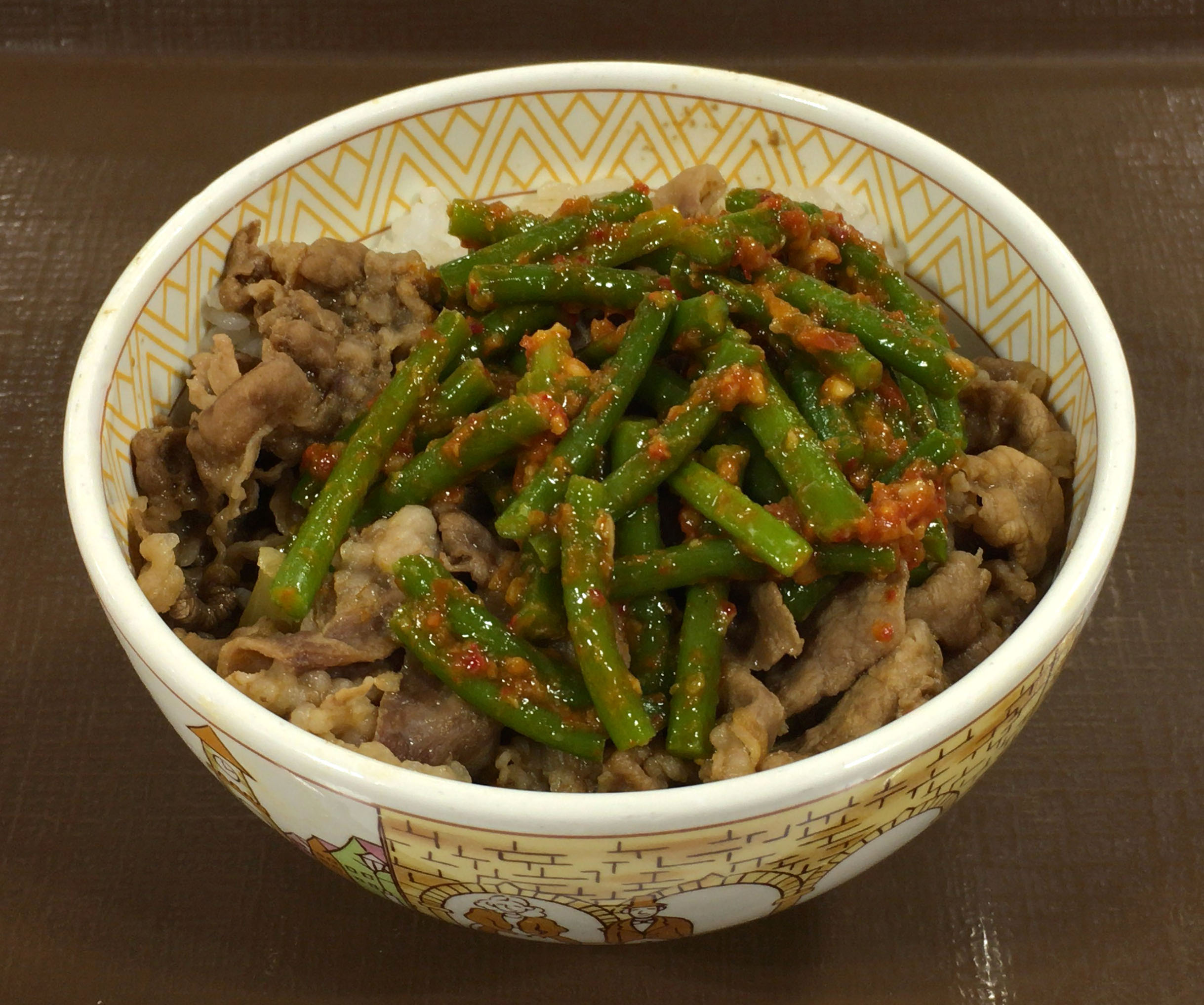
With garlic sprouts

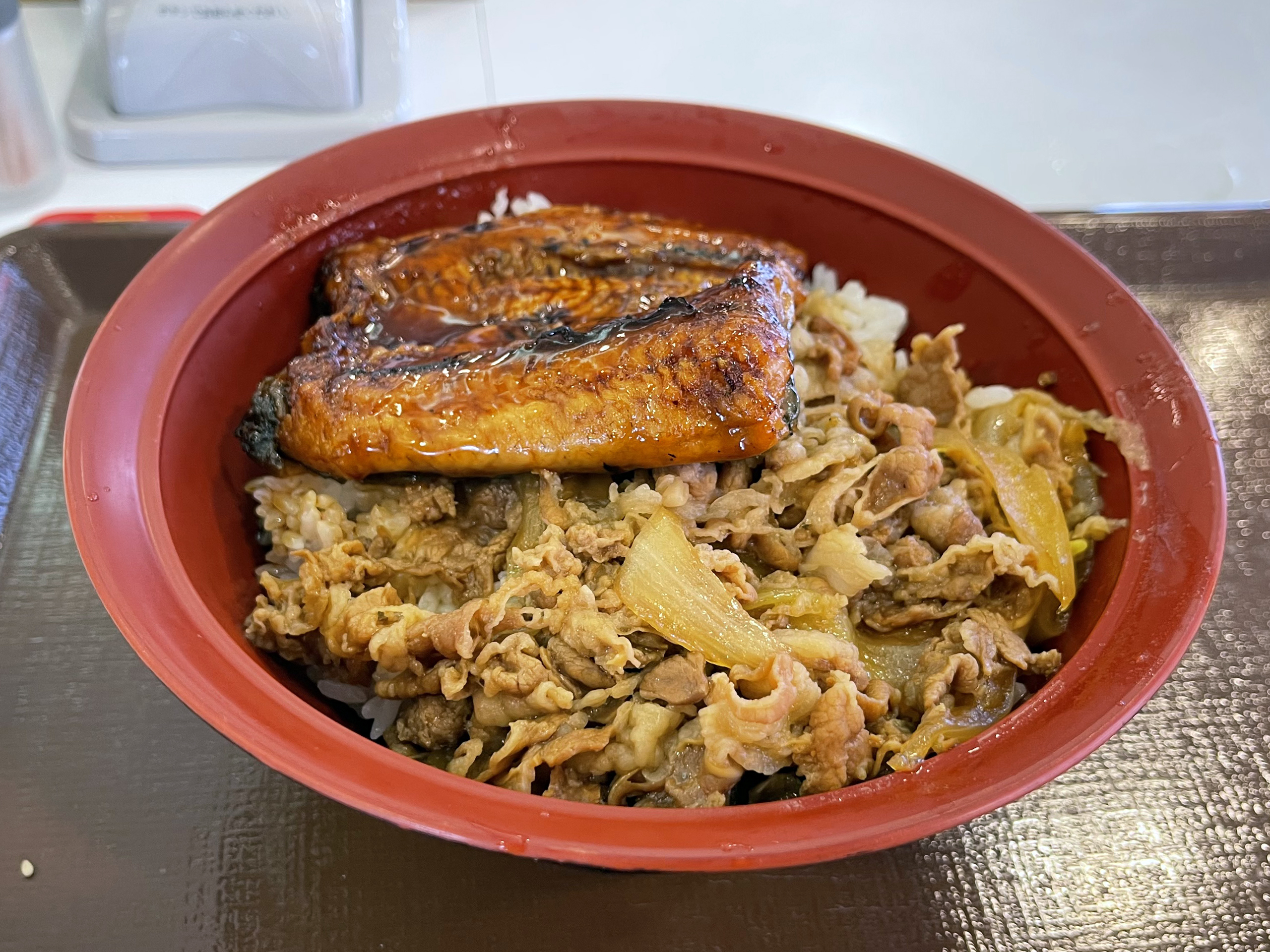
With unagi

=== Other foods ===
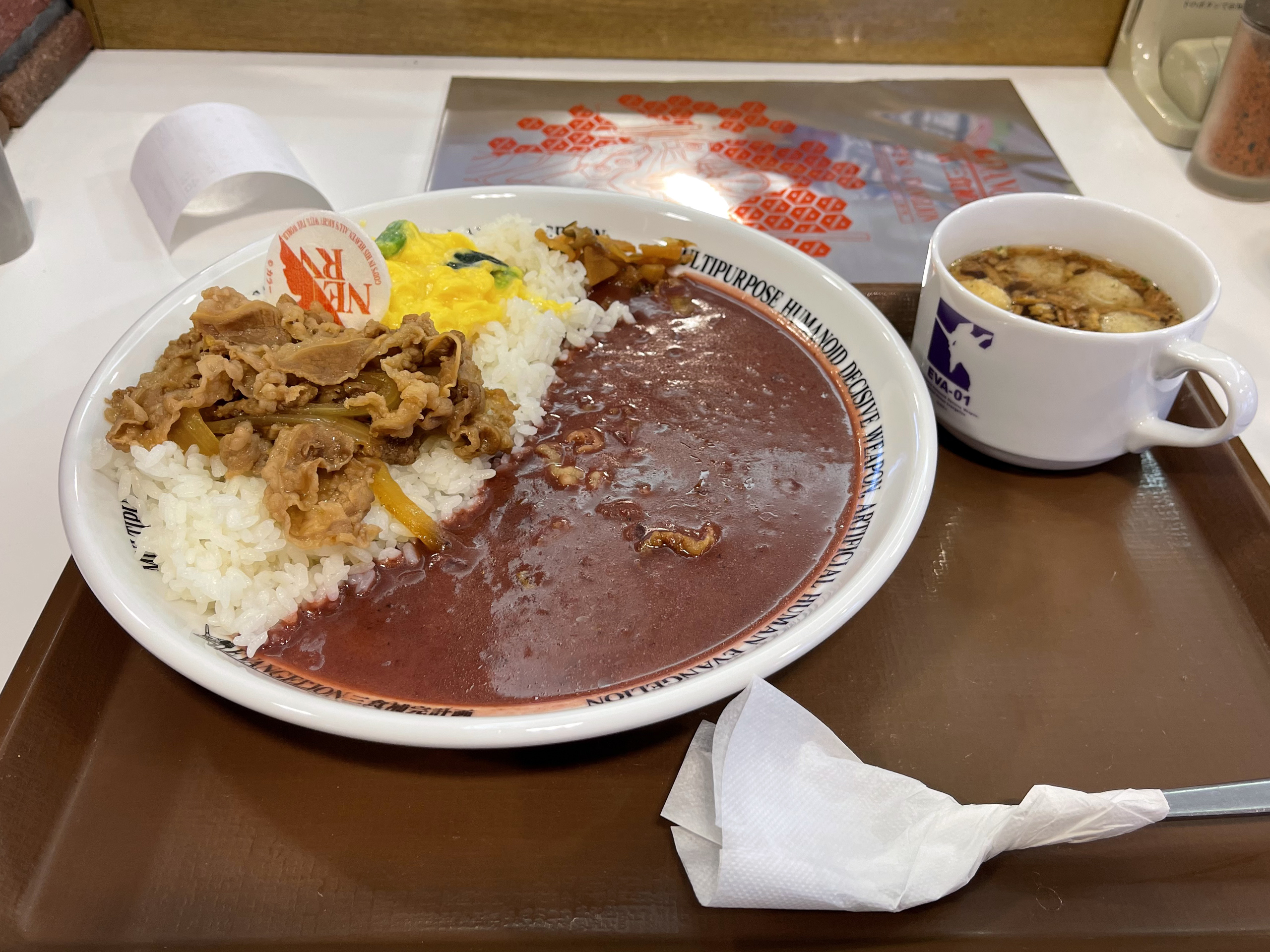
Beef curry with omelette

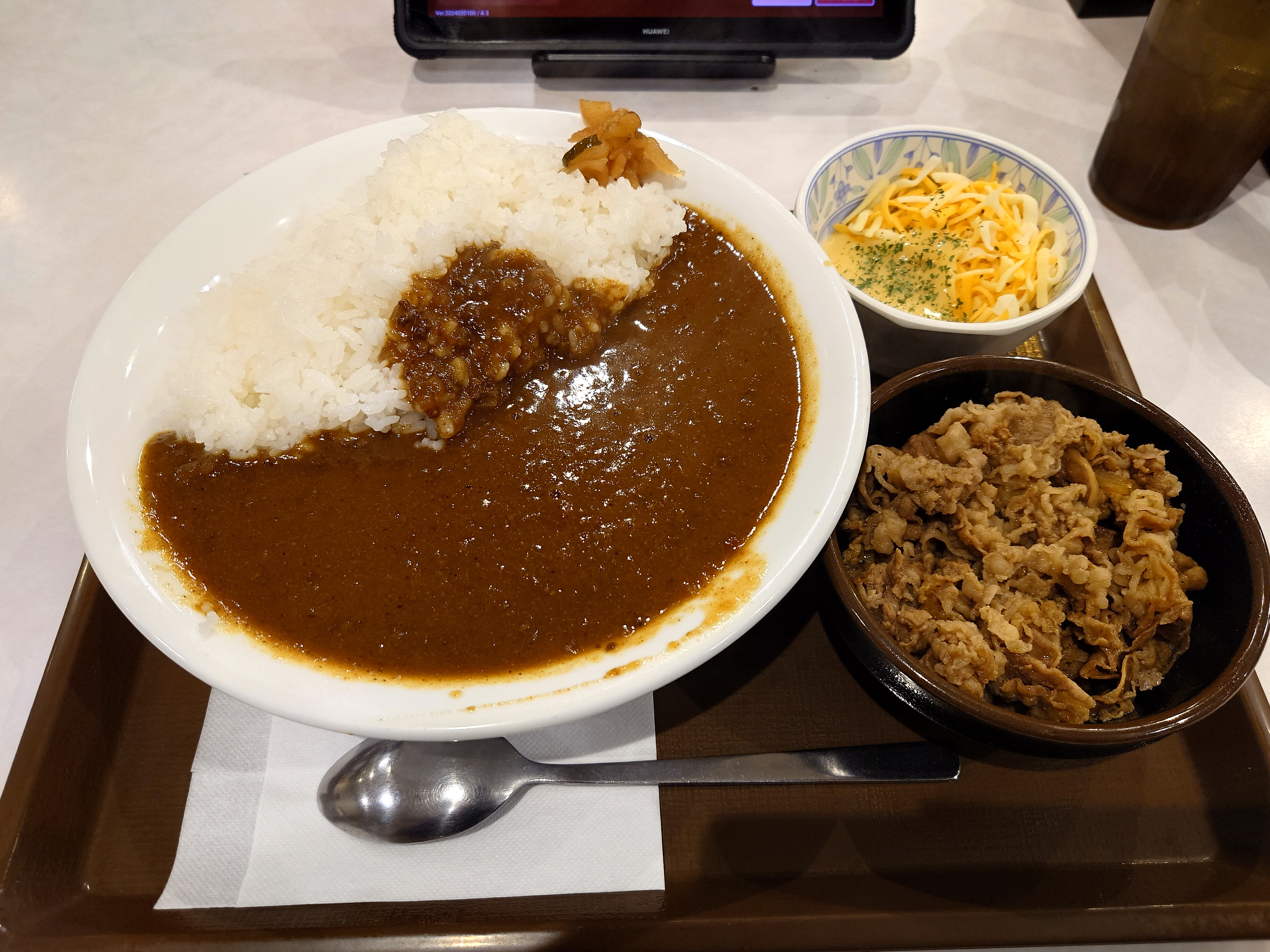
Beef curry with cheese

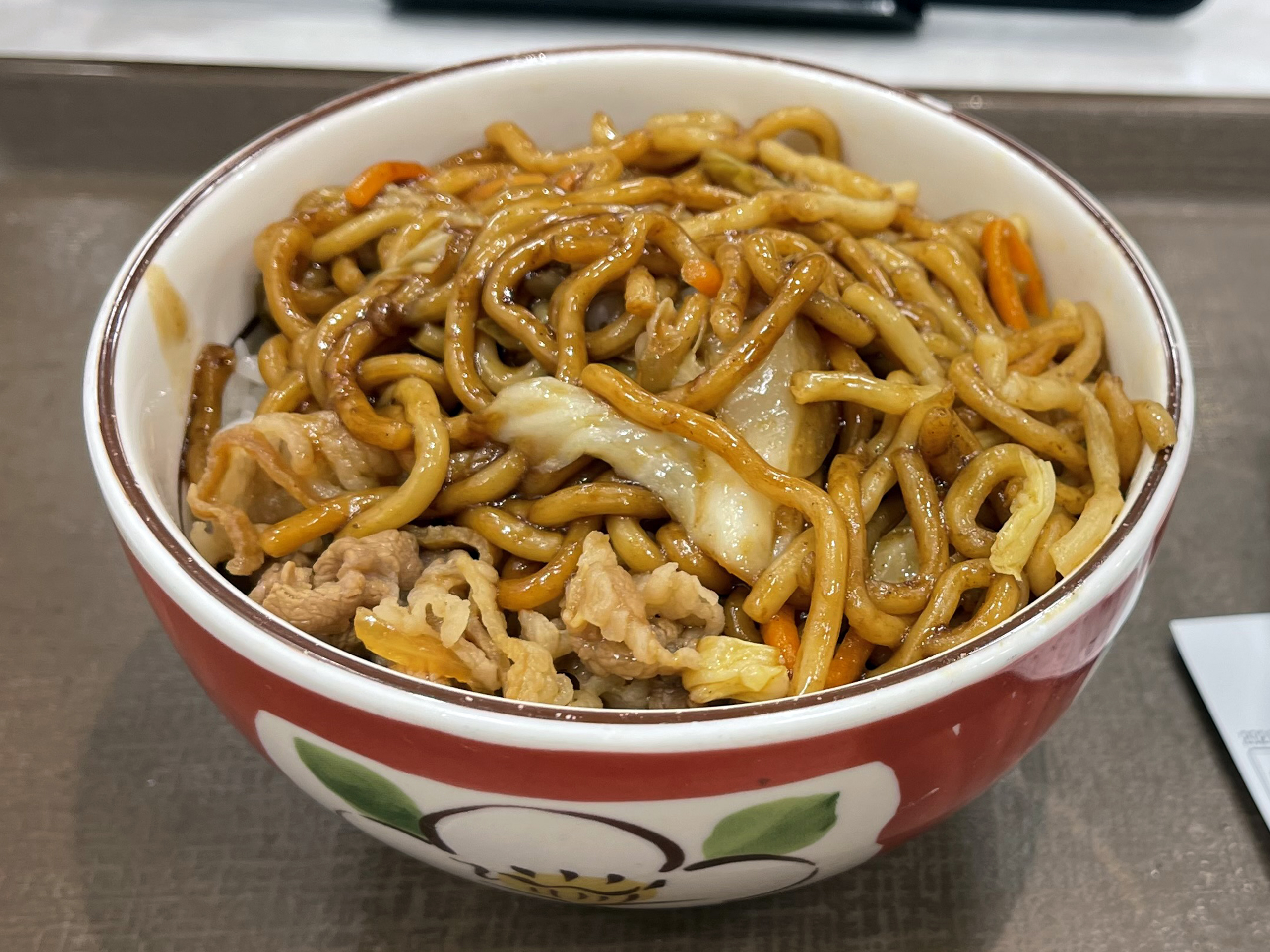
Yakisoba with beef

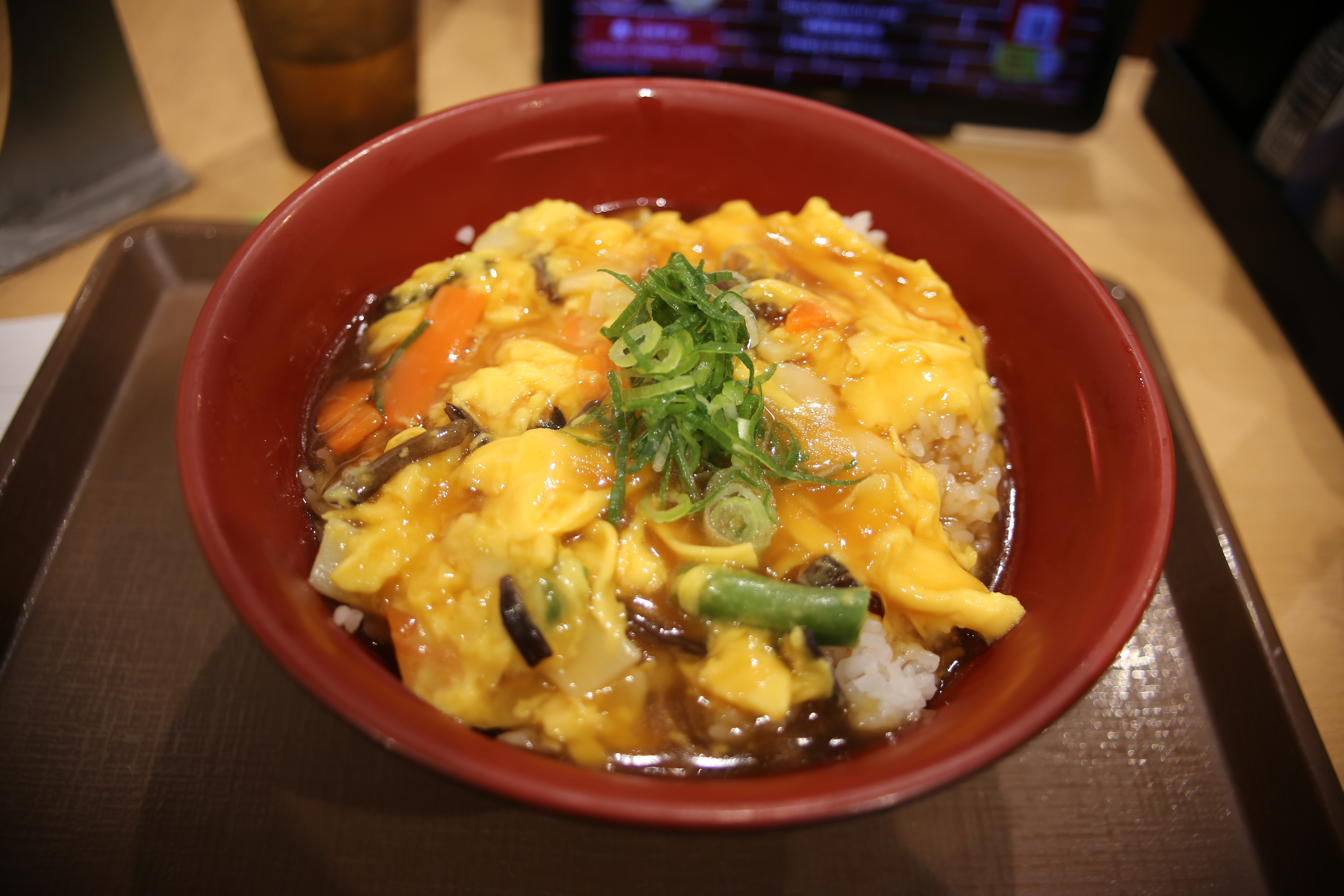
Tenshindon

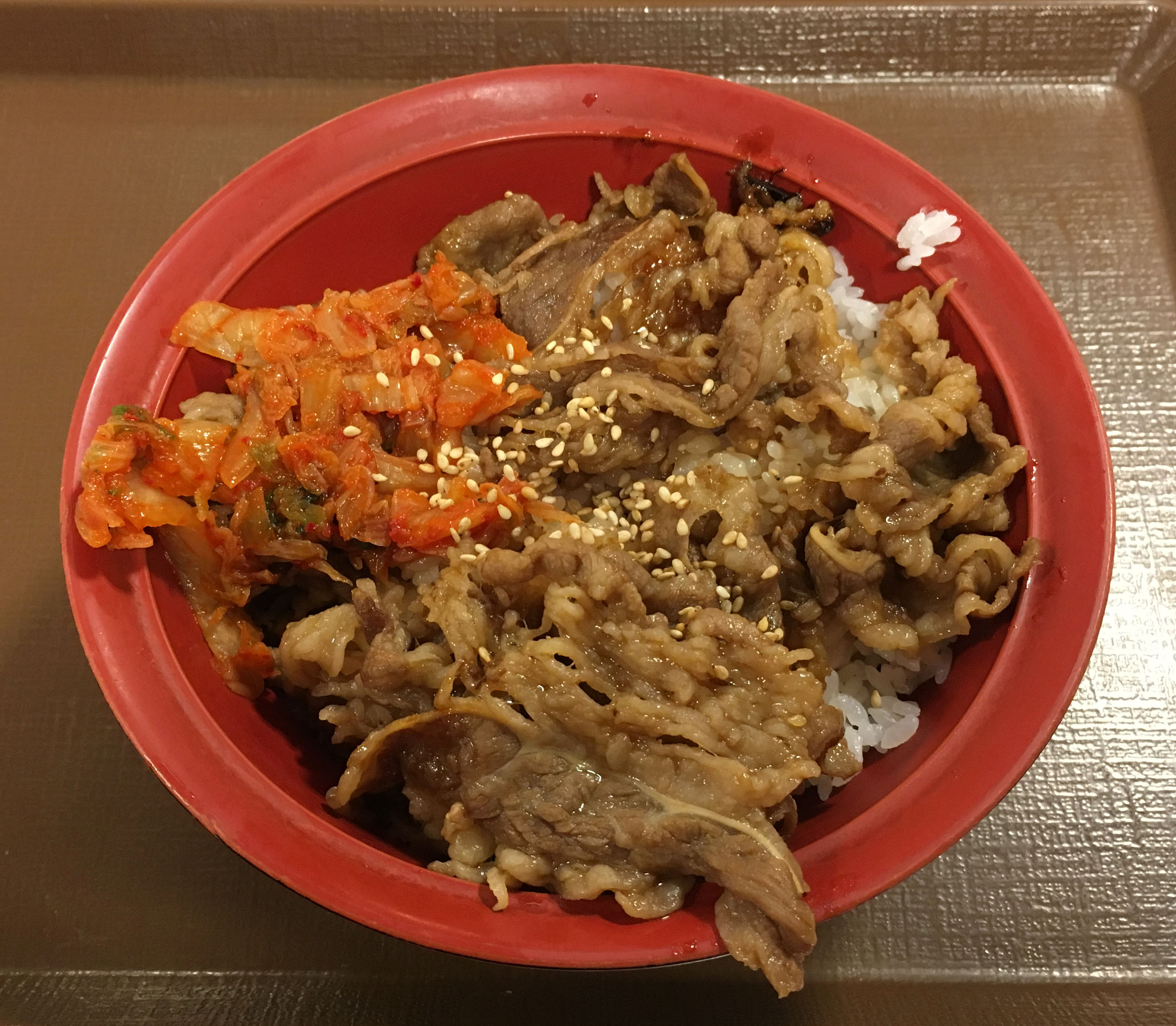
Beef galbi bowl with kimchi

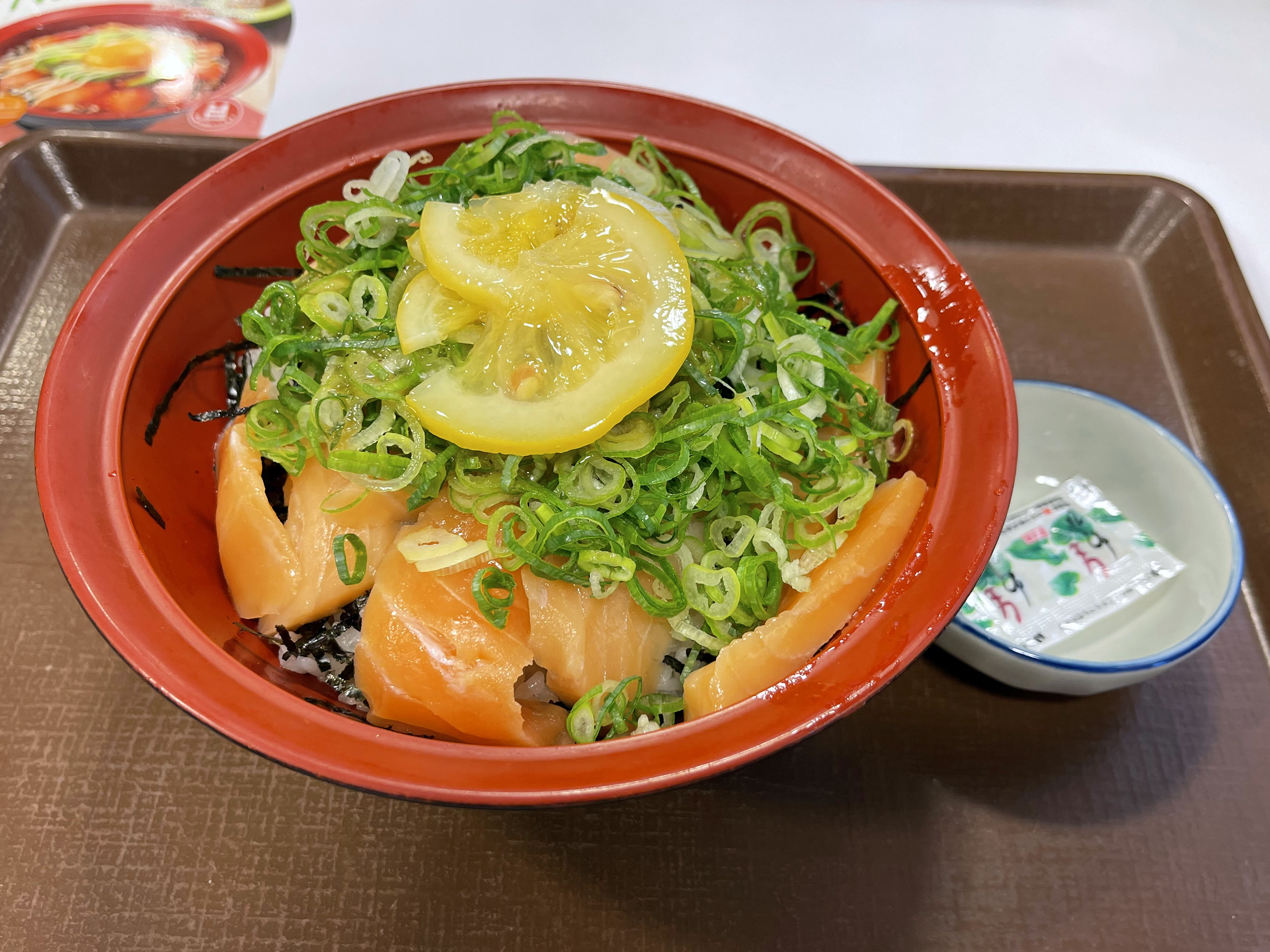
Salmon bowl with salty lemon

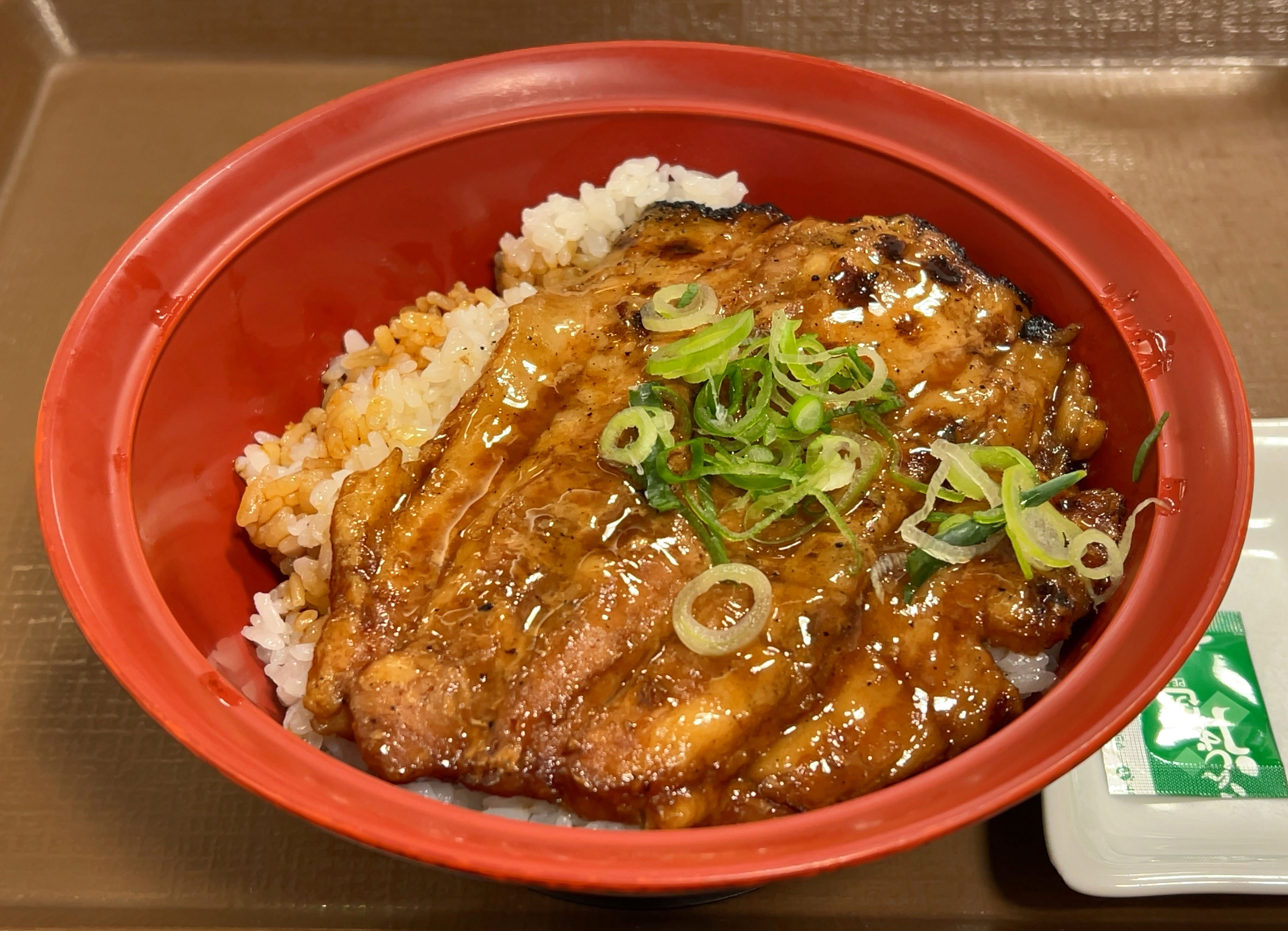
Tondon, or pork bowl

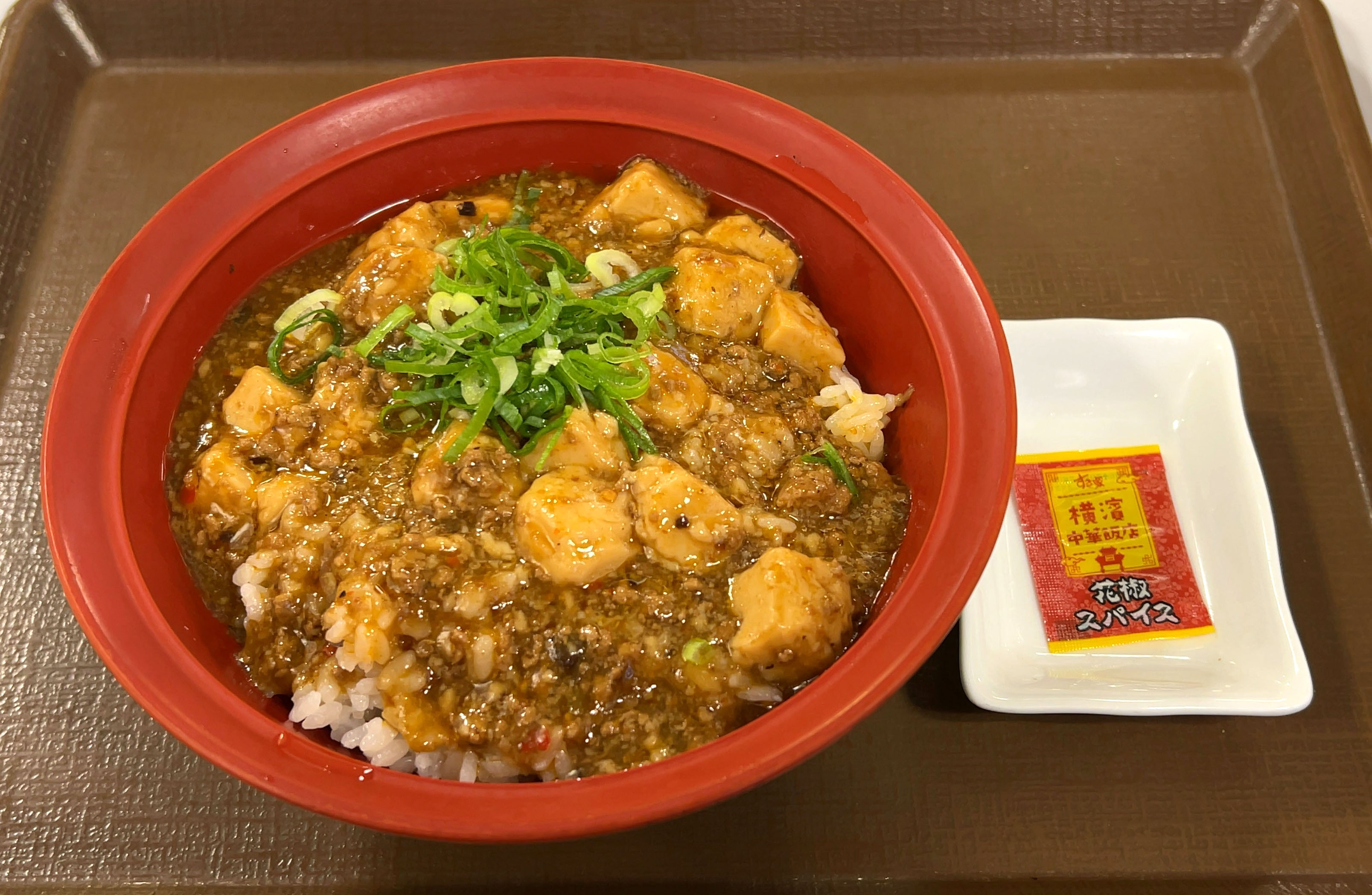
Mapo tofu bowl

== See also ==
- Donburi
- Yakiniku
- Matsuya
- Yoshinoya
