= Lotteria =

South Korean fast food restaurant chain

LOTTE GRS Hamburger Division

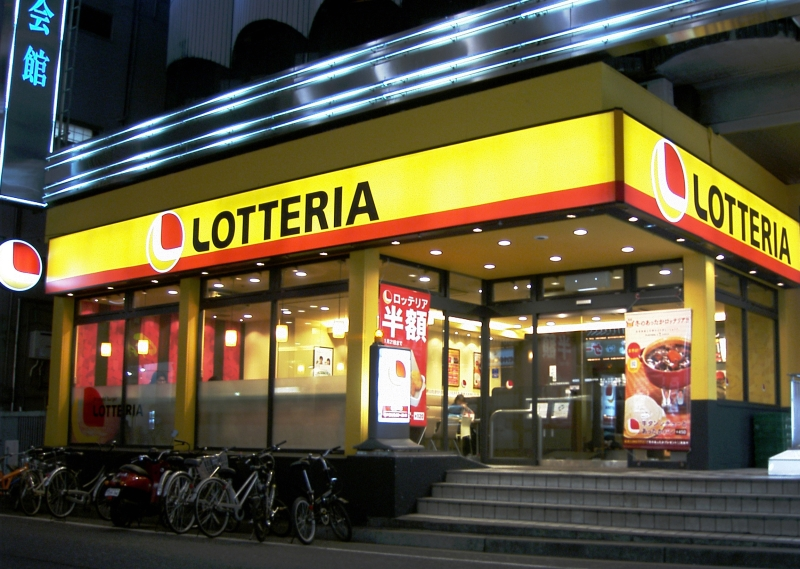
- Stores in Japan
- Native name: 롯데리아 (Korean) ロッテリア (Japanese)
- Type: Division
- Industry: Fast food
- Founded: 2 February 1972; 54 years ago (Japan); 25 October 1979; 47 years ago (South Korea)
- Founder: Shin Kyuk-ho
- Headquarters: Doksan-dong, Geumcheon, Seoul, South Korea
- Parent: Lotte Corporation (Korea); Zensho (Japan)
- Website: www.lottegrs.com/eng/business/brand.jsp www.lotteria.com

Lotteria (Korean: 롯데리아; Japanese: ロッテリア; stylized in all caps) is a South Korean-Japanese company that operates a chain of fast food restaurants in East Asia, having opened its first restaurant in Tokyo in September 1972. Taking its name from its parent company, Lotte Corporation, it currently has franchises in South Korea, Indonesia, Vietnam, Cambodia, Laos, Myanmar, Malaysia, Singapore and the United States. The origin of the name is a combination of corporate names Lotte and Cafeteria.

Its menu includes typical fast-food items such as burgers, french fries, fried chicken, chicken wings and chicken fingers.

== History ==
The company was founded in February 1972 in Tokyo, Japan, by Shin Kyuk-ho, a Korean entrepreneur. Its first franchises opened in Nihonbashi, Ueno and Yokohama in September of that year. In 1979, the brand was established in Seoul, South Korea. Lotteria later spread throughout East Asia adding locations in China, Myanmar, Taiwan and Vietnam.

== Businesses by country ==
=== Japan ===
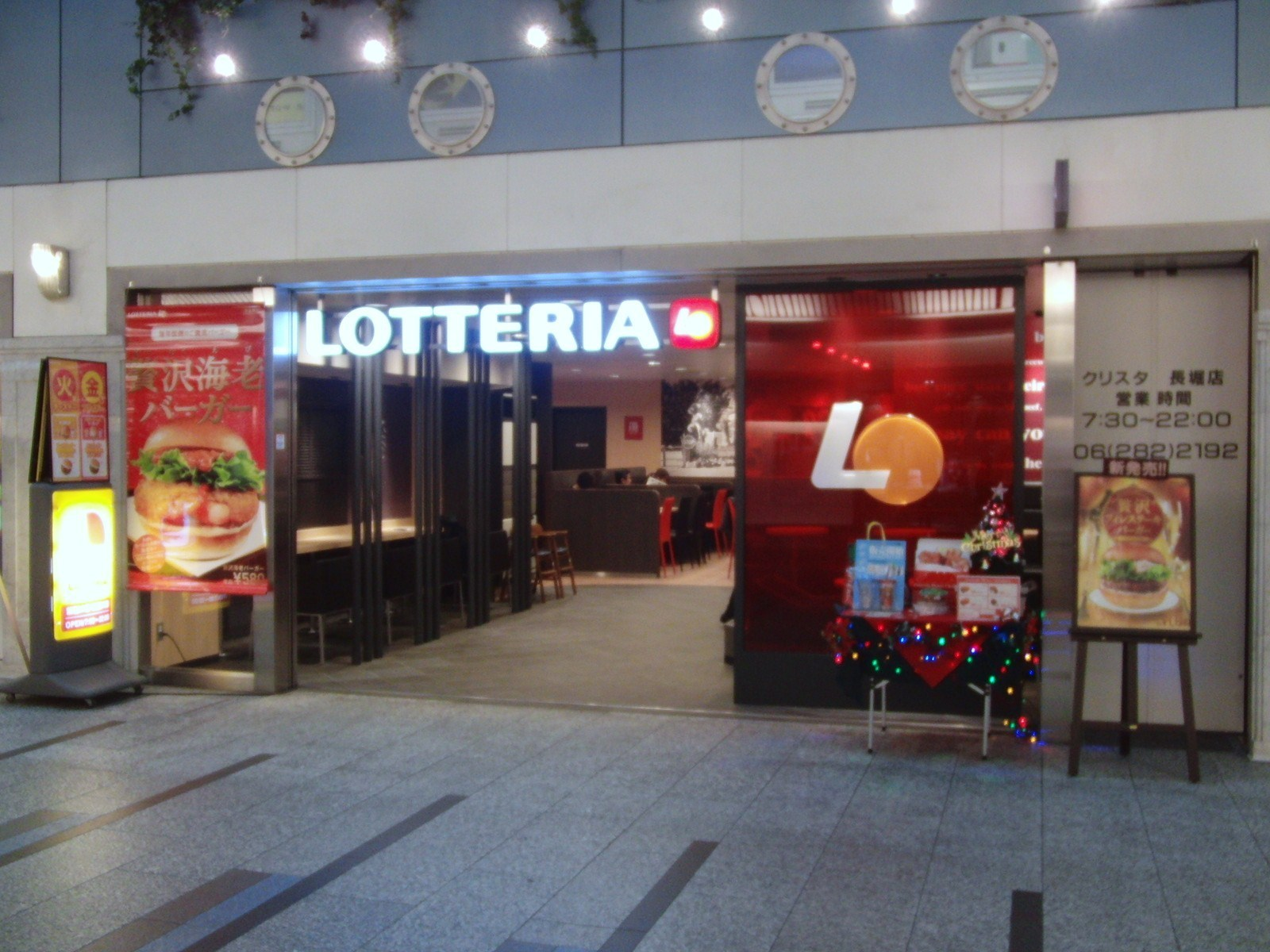
Lotteria in Osaka, Japan.

In 2005, Genichi Tamatsuka, the former president of Fast Retailing Co. (which operates the Uniqlo brand), was appointed as chairman and CEO during a management restructuring in 2005. The appointment was the result of a previous contract undertaken by Revamp Corp, a business revitalization company.

On 16 February 2023, Lotteria of Japan announced all shares of Lotteria would be sold to major Japanese fast food holding company Zensho on 1 April 2023. In September, Zensho opened a spinoff chain of Lotteria called Zetteria (ゼッテリア). On 16 February 2026, Lotteria Co., Ltd. changed its name to Burger One Co., Ltd. (株式会社バーガー・ワン, Kabushiki gaisha Bāgā Wan). In addition, all existing Lotteria branches will operate until March 2026 before transitioning to Zetteria, bringing an end to Lotteria in Japan's 54-year history.

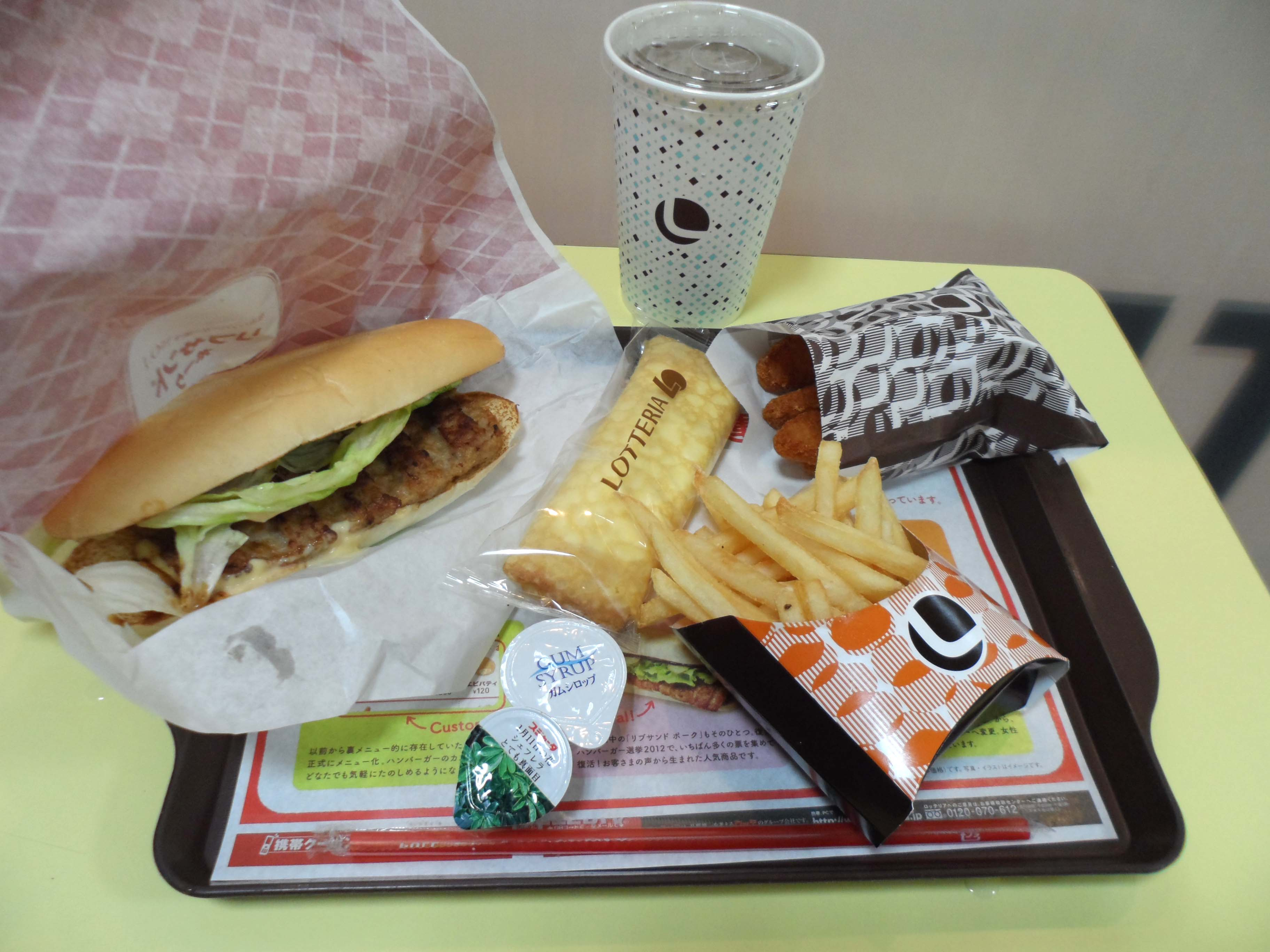
A Lotteria lunch in Japan. A sandwich set accompanied by chicken sticks and a crepe.

=== South Korea ===
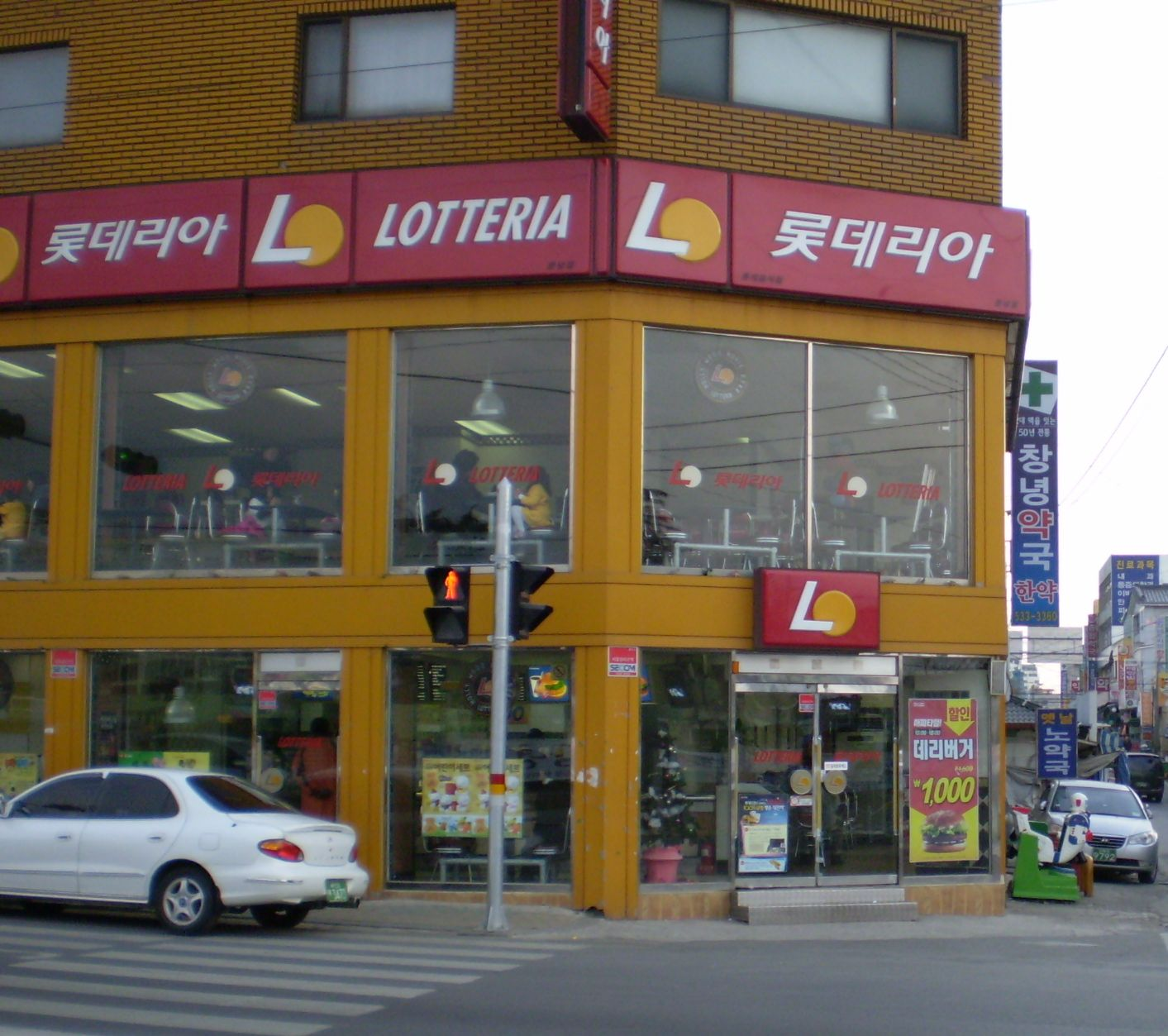
A Lotteria in Changnyeong, South Korea

Lotteria South Korea was founded in 1979, as part of an expansion of the Lotte Group which also included Lotte Chilsung Beverages, Lotte Food and Lotte Ham. Lotteria became the number-one fast food restaurant chain in South Korea. The company achieved a 45% market share in 2001 (compared to 20.1 percent for McDonald's). Lotteria's success was achieved in part by introducing lines of Koreanized fast food including its now signature kimchi burger, leading to it being seen by most Koreans as a native version of most Western-style fast-food restaurants. The company tries to imitate the western idea of fast food through "cleanliness, bright interior, Western pop music as an audio background," with the idea of trying to create "the impression of a 'small piece of America in the middle of Korea'". Their business strategy resulted in growth rates of 10 percent in 2006 and 16 percent in 2007; by 2009, Lotteria had 920 outlets across the country.

In March 2009, Lotteria took full control of the South Korean branch of T.G.I. Friday's. It had previously invested 10 billion won in the chain in 2002. Lotteria also runs Natuur, one of South Korea's major ice cream franchises, itself introduced to South Korea by Lotte in 1998.

Lotteria is also famous for shrimp burgers. In January 2021, the square shrimp double burger, which was released for a month for limited sales, announced that it would sell it as a regular product due to favorable responses.

=== China ===
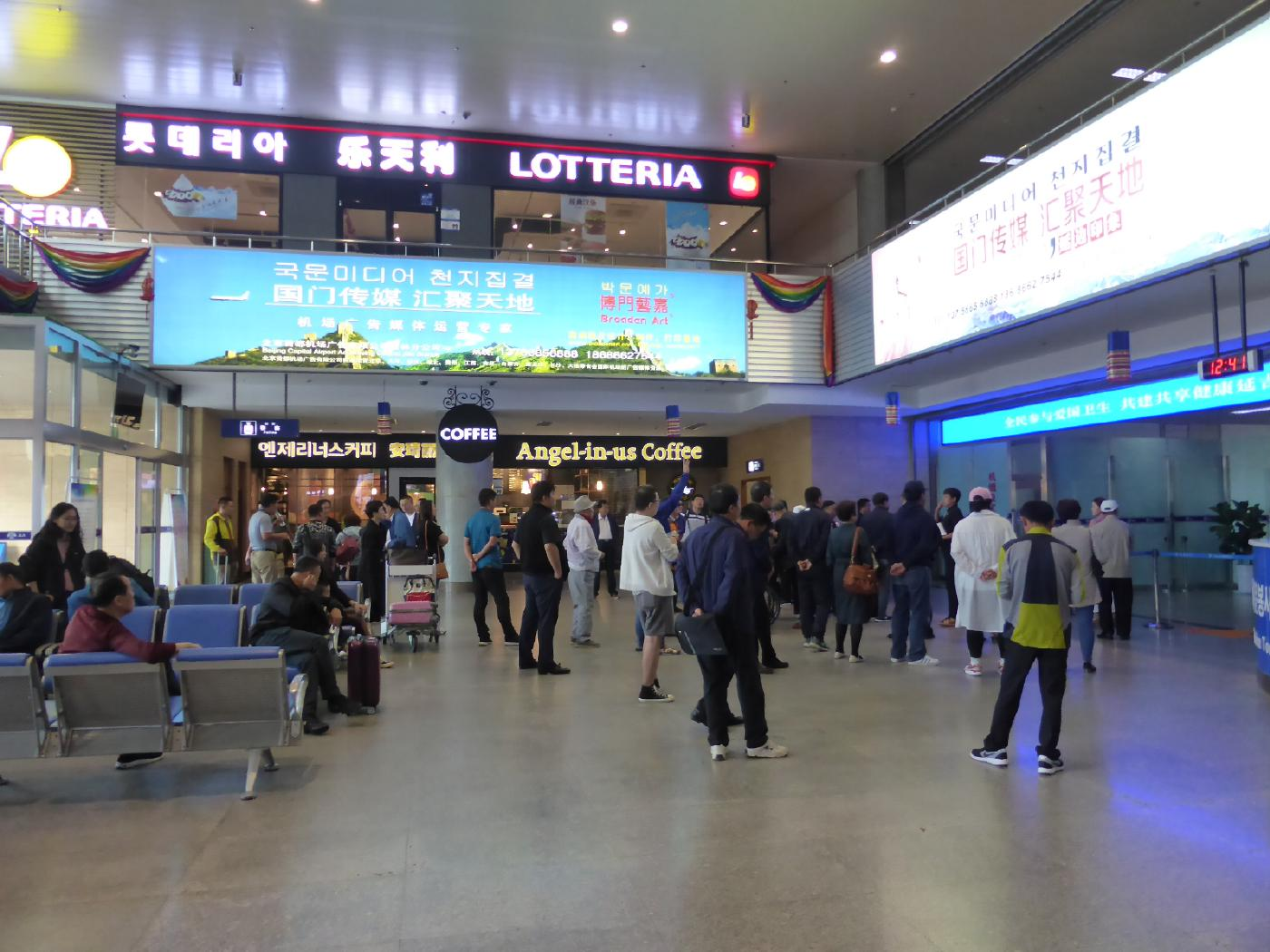
Lotteria and Angel-in-us Coffee at Yanji Chaoyangchuan International Airport, Jilin, China

Lotteria entered the Chinese market in 1994 and mainly centered in Beijing, but it ended operation in 2003 due to a lack of popularity among potential customers. In 2008, Lotteria restarted business in China with new operation strategies that specifically targeting Yanbian Korean Autonomous Region, other stores are located in cities like Beijing, Qingdao, Yantai and Shenyang.

=== Vietnam ===
The restaurant entered the Vietnamese market in 2004. They have a special menu that cannot be found in any other country, which is called "rice and spaghetti".

=== Indonesia ===
The chain opened its first Indonesian franchise on 19 October 2011 at Lotte Mart Kelapa Gading, North Jakarta. As of 2015, the chain had 32 outlets in Greater Jakarta, Karawang and Bandung. All outlets in Indonesia were permanently closed on 29 June 2020.

=== Cambodia ===
The chain opened its first Cambodian franchise in June 2014 at Aeon Mall, followed by a second store in December 2014 at Soria Mall. All outlets of the chain in Cambodia were closed in 2024.

=== Myanmar ===
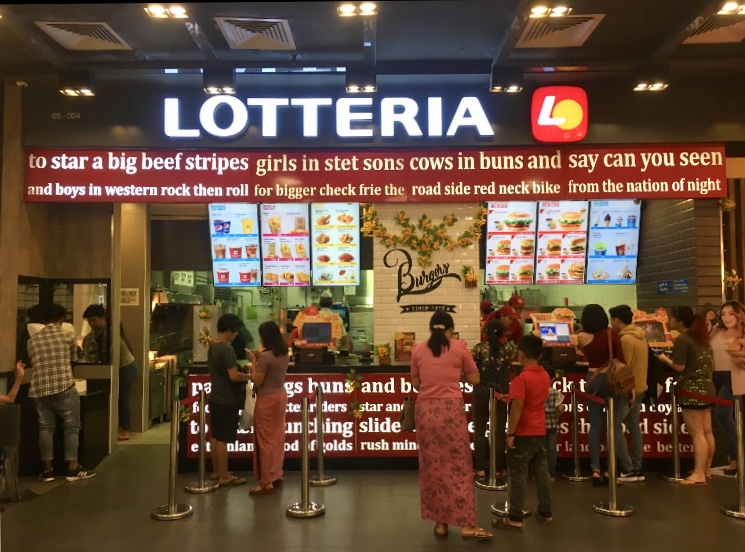
A Lotteria branch located in Junction City, Yangon, known for their fried chicken and burgers.

The first Lotteria restaurant in Myanmar was opened in Junction Square in Yangon in April 2013, with plans to open 24 more by 2016 from Yangon to Nay Pyi Taw. Along with the regular fare of chicken and burgers, Lotteria is offering dishes tailored to Myanmar consumers, such as chicken rice.

=== Singapore ===
Lotteria enters Singapore on 11 February 2026 with the first outlet at Jewel Changi Airport.

=== United States ===
In 2023, The chain has interest to expand outside of Asia by opening a location in the United States. Lotteria had its introduction at the National Restaurant Association Show in Chicago the following year. On August 14, 2025, Lotteria opened first U.S. Store in Fullerton, California with a preview opening from August 11 to August 13 of the same year.

=== Malaysia ===
Lotteria entered the Malaysian market in late 2025, opening its first store at The Curve in Petaling Jaya, Selangor. The outlet commenced operations on 1 December 2025, with its official launch scheduled for 6 December 2025. The company had previously expressed interest in expanding to the country in 2023.

=== Mongolia ===
The first Lotteria restaurant in Mongolia was opened in the capital city, Ulaanbaatar on 23 June 2018. As of 2025, there are 6 open outlets in Ulaanbaatar.

== Other business strategies ==
In 2003, Lotteria partnered with KT and Intel to provide Wi-Fi access in its restaurants, to help attract more customers. This service has also been available in every restaurant in Japan for NTT Docomo and au mobile users since 2006.

Lotteria has followed the global fast-food trend of shifting towards health-conscious foods and rebranding its image. In the face of health trends, it eliminated trans fats from its French fries. It also introduced healthier menu items, such as a rye bread burger that totals only 350 calories. From 2008, perhaps as a response to McDonald's strategy to become more upmarket, Lotteria began a campaign to change "the image of our stores to create a mood similar to a cafe, geared toward the health-conscious as well as female customers".

== Recycling in South Korea ==
In South Korea, waste is separated by category.

Since 2003, the South Korean government has required a 50-to-100 Won deposit to be levied against all disposable cups sold in restaurants to ensure that they were returned to be recycled. As such, products (such as drinks and ice cream) to be consumed in-store are served in reusable plastic containers; or if a customer purchases their product in a disposable cup and pays the deposit, they can have their deposit refunded if they return the empty cup to the counter staff. The recycling law yielded recycling rates for cups of 14 percent in 2003, 22 percent in 2004, and 25 percent in 2005. This law has since been repealed.

The Seoul city government requires mandatory garbage sorting with food, recyclables and general trash to be separated from each other. Specialized receptacles thus exist (for liquids, paper, uneaten food, plastic, and other general waste) at all Lotteria restaurants. In addition, Lotteria also charges a fee of 50-to-100 Won on bags as is the norm for most Western-style stores and other shopping venues in South Korea.

In 2021, Lotteria announced the introduction of drinking lids instead of straws to reduce the use of plastic straws at 100 direct stores.

== See also ==
- List of hamburger restaurants
