= The Chicken Rice Shop =

Malaysian family restaurant chain

- Company type: Private
- Industry: Food and beverages
- Founded: June 2000; 26 years ago
- Founder: Gaik Wong
- Headquarters: Kota Damansara, Petaling Jaya, Malaysia
- Parent: Zensho Holdings
- Website: www.thechickenriceshop.com

TCRS Restaurants Sdn Bhd (doing business as The Chicken Rice Shop) is a Malaysian family restaurant chain established in June 2000, specialising in Hainanese chicken rice and other Malaysian cuisine.

== History ==
The company was founded by Gaik Wong, a former COO-cum-director of KFC Holdings (M) Bhd, who had been working in the fast food industry for 25 years before the foundation of TCRS. The first store was founded in Taipan USJ of UEP Subang Jaya. In 2019, the company was acquired by Japanese-Zensho Holdings for a $53 million (RM220 million ringgit).

== Locations ==
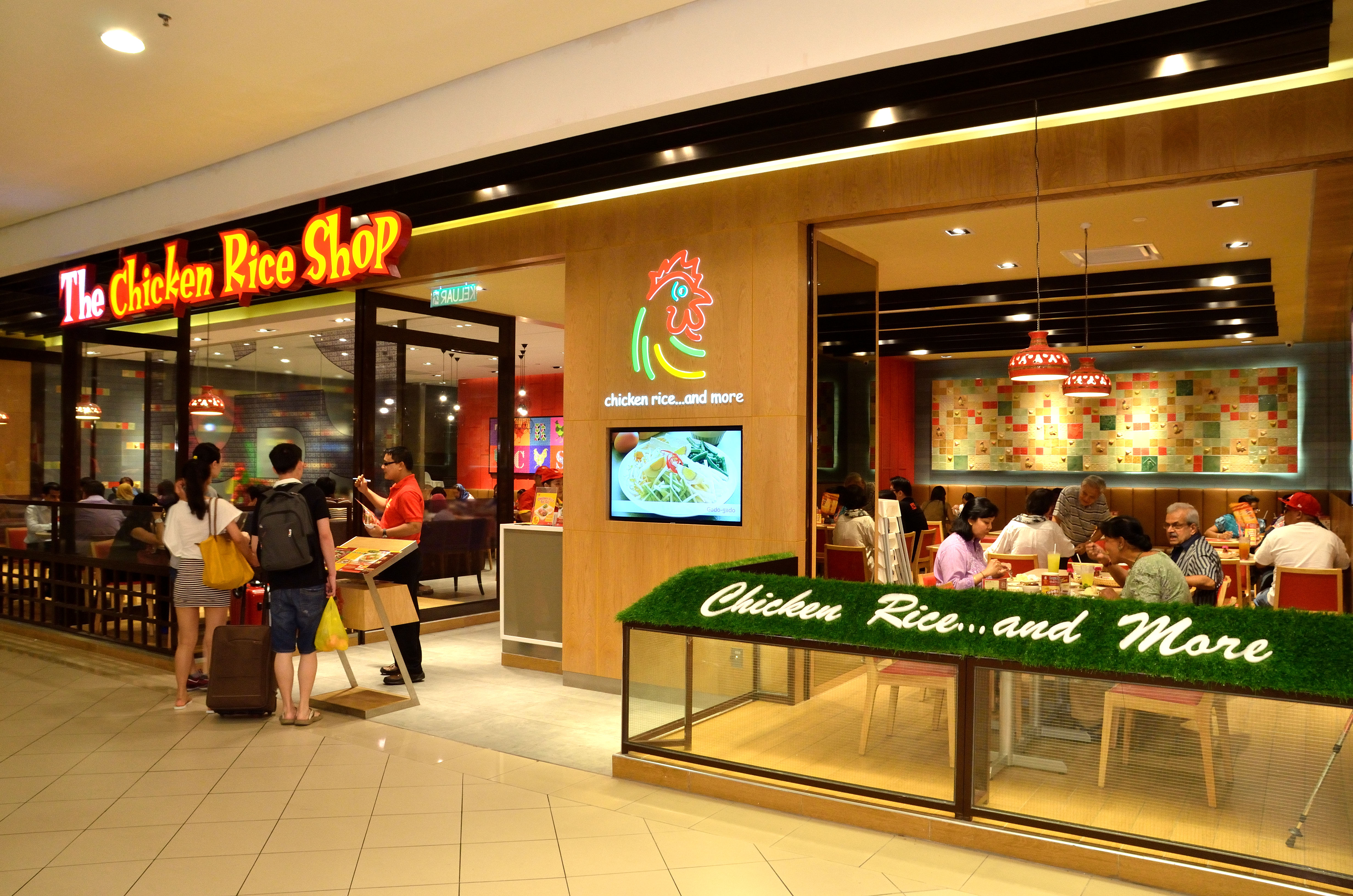
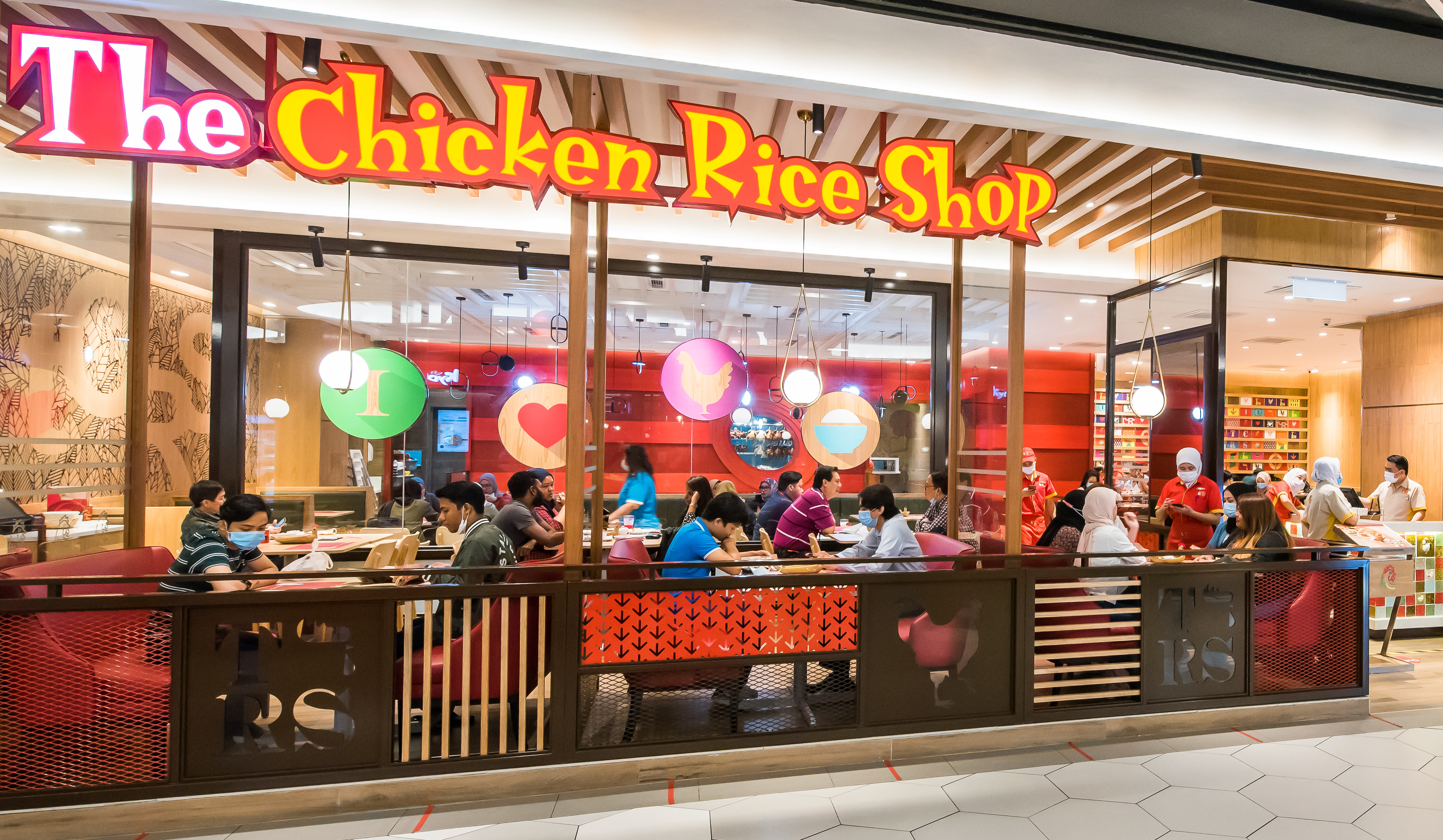
The Chicken Rice Shop store at Mid Valley Megamall in Malaysia

There are more than 100 locations in Peninsular Malaysia and East Malaysia (excluding Labuan) to date. These outlets are situated in various locations, including shopping malls and urban areas, with the Mid Valley Megamall being one such location. There is also one TCRS located in ÆON Mall BSD City in Tangerang, Indonesia.

== Menu ==
The restaurant's primary offering is Hainanese chicken rice, complemented by a variety of Malaysian dishes. The emphasis is on maintaining traditional flavours and cooking methods.
