= Kōnan, Tokyo =

Kōnan 港南
- District
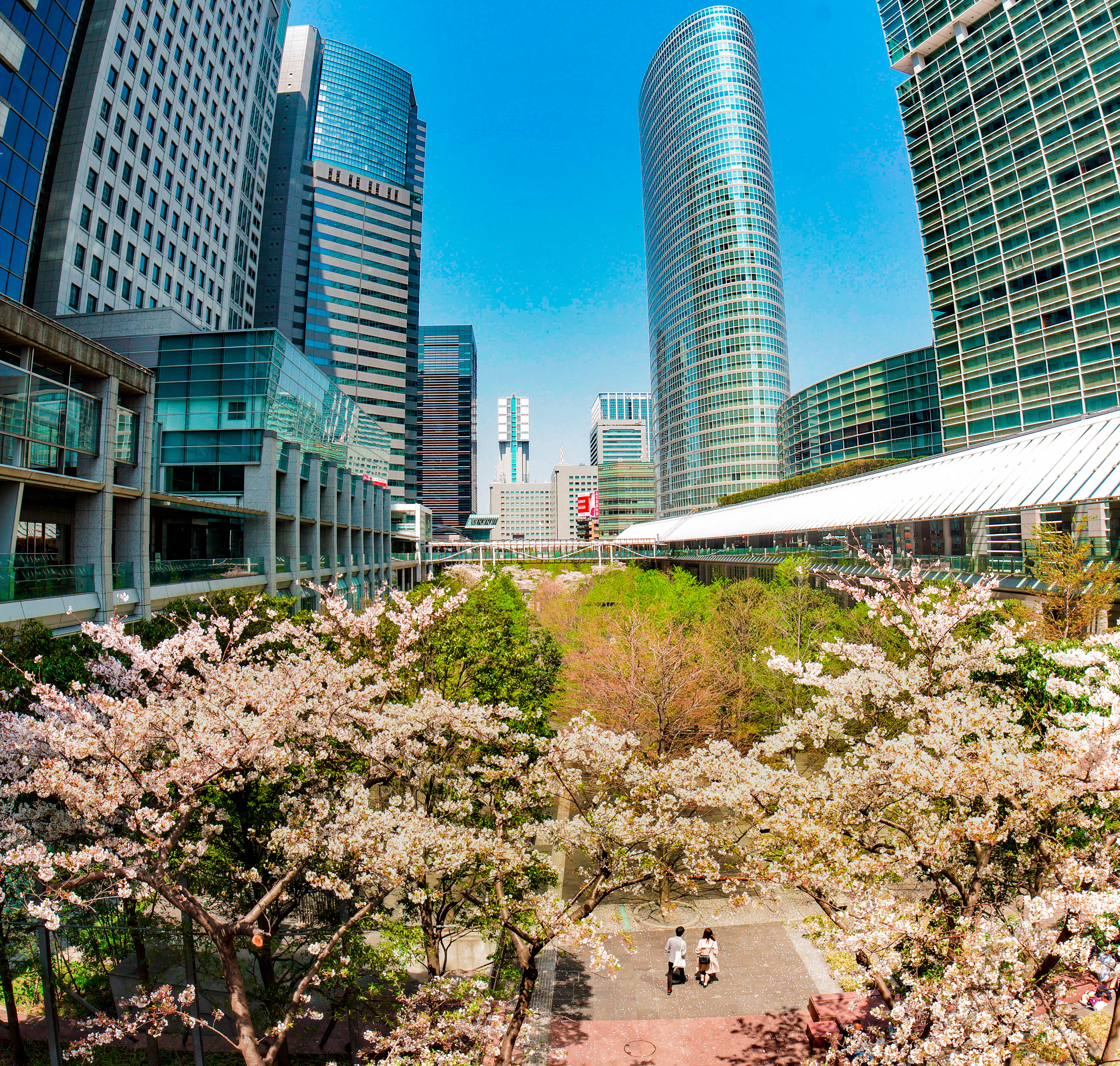

- Location of Kōnan within Tokyo Location of Kōnan within Tokyo Bay
- Coordinates: 35°37′53.12″N 139°45′1.77″E
- Country: Japan
- Region: Kantō
- Prefecture: Tokyo
- Ward: Minato
- Established: -

Area
  - Total: 2.19 km^{2} (0.85 sq mi)

Population (August 1, 2019)
  - Total: 20,819
  - Density: 9,510/km^{2} (24,600/sq mi)
- Time zone: UTC+9 (JST)
- Zip code: 108-0075
- Area code: 03

Kōnan (港南) is a district of Minato, Tokyo, Japan. The current administrative place names are Konan 1-chome to Konan 5-chome. It is within the Shibaura-Kōnan District General Branch of the Japan Post Service.

== Education ==
Minato City Board of Education operates public elementary and junior high schools.

Kōnan 1-5 chōme are zoned to Kōnan Elementary School (港南小学校) and Kōnan Junior High School (港南中学校).

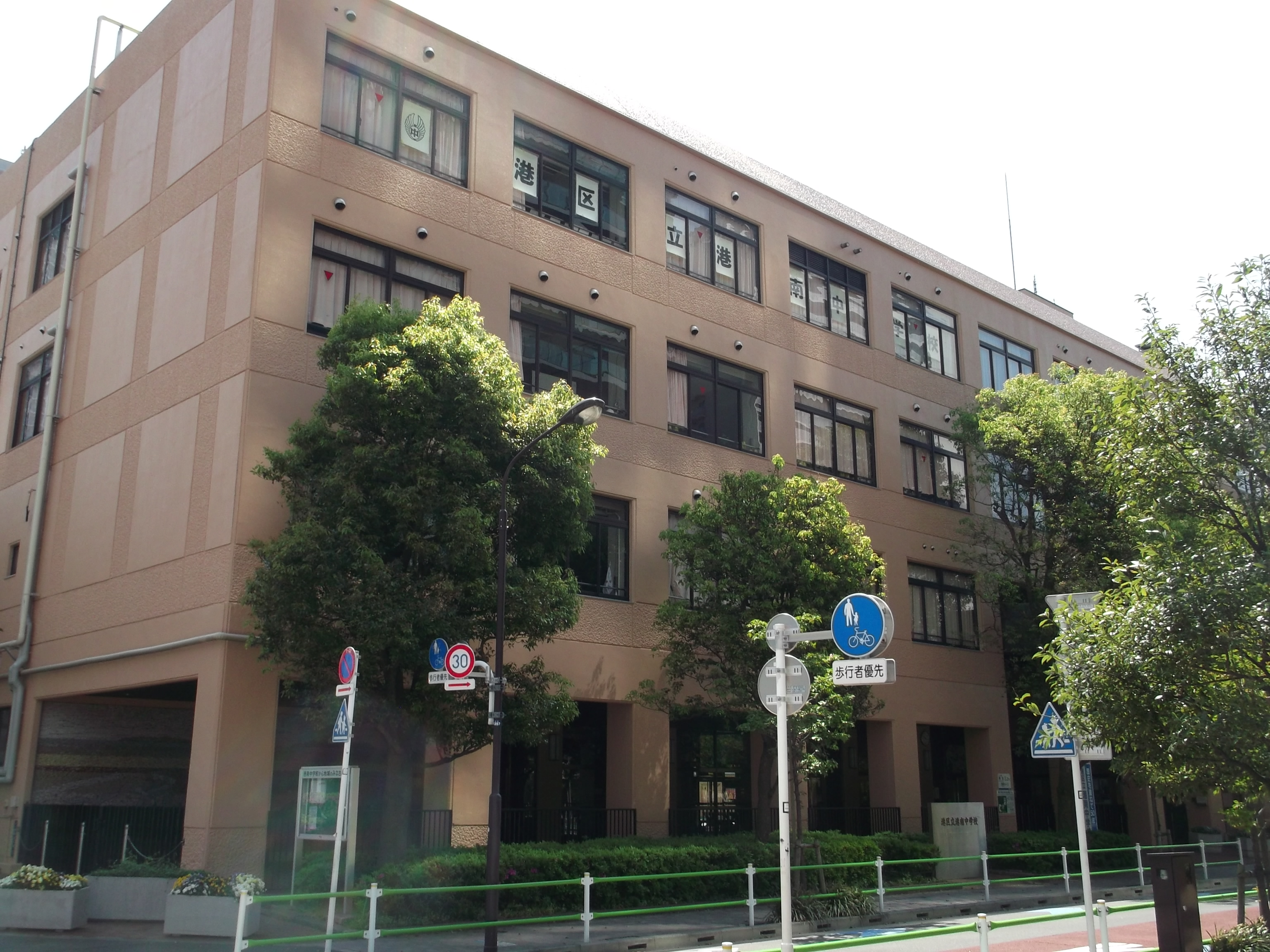
Kōnan Junior High School (港南中学校)

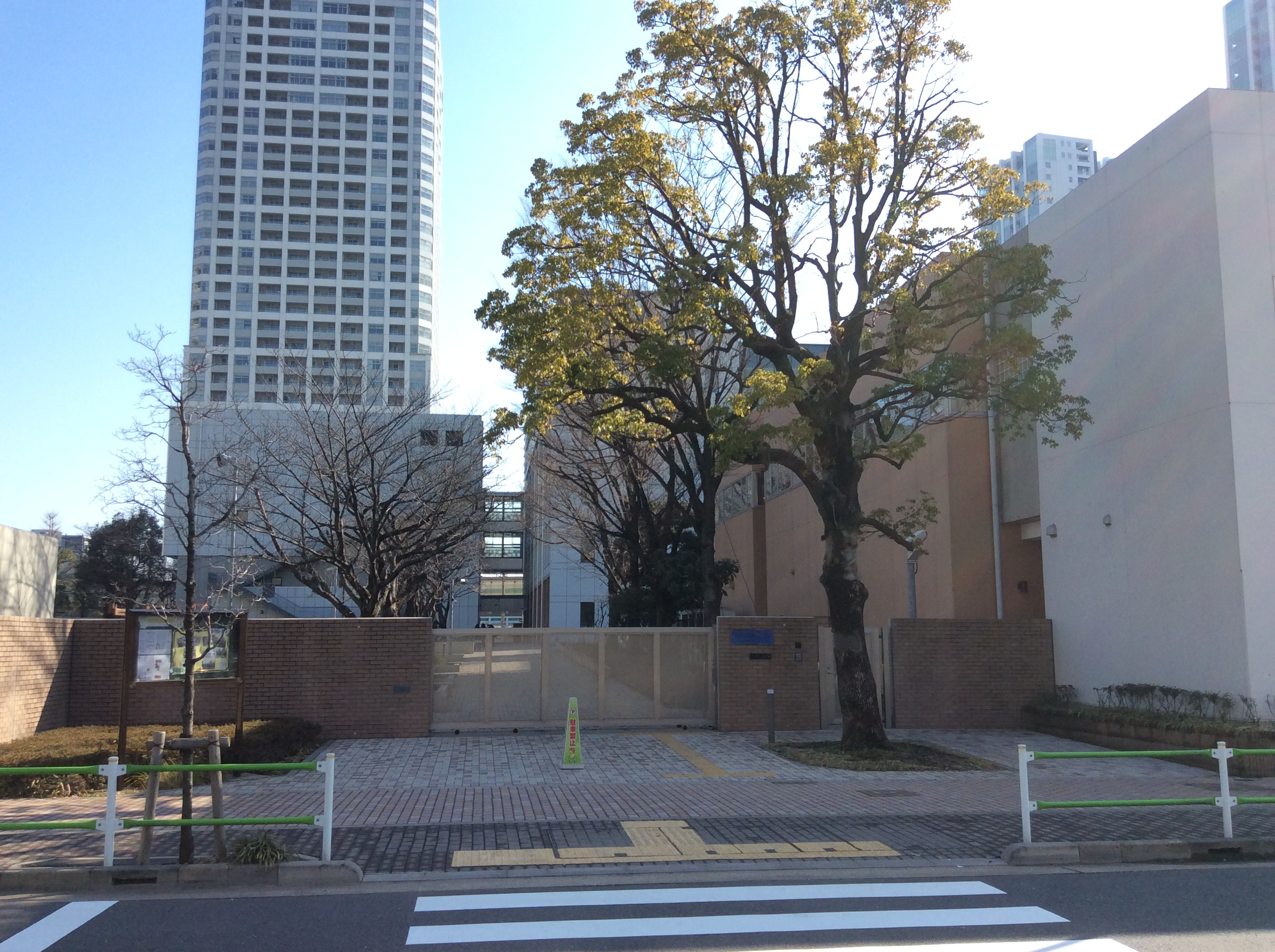
Kōnan Elementary School (港南小学校)
