= Doughnut shop =

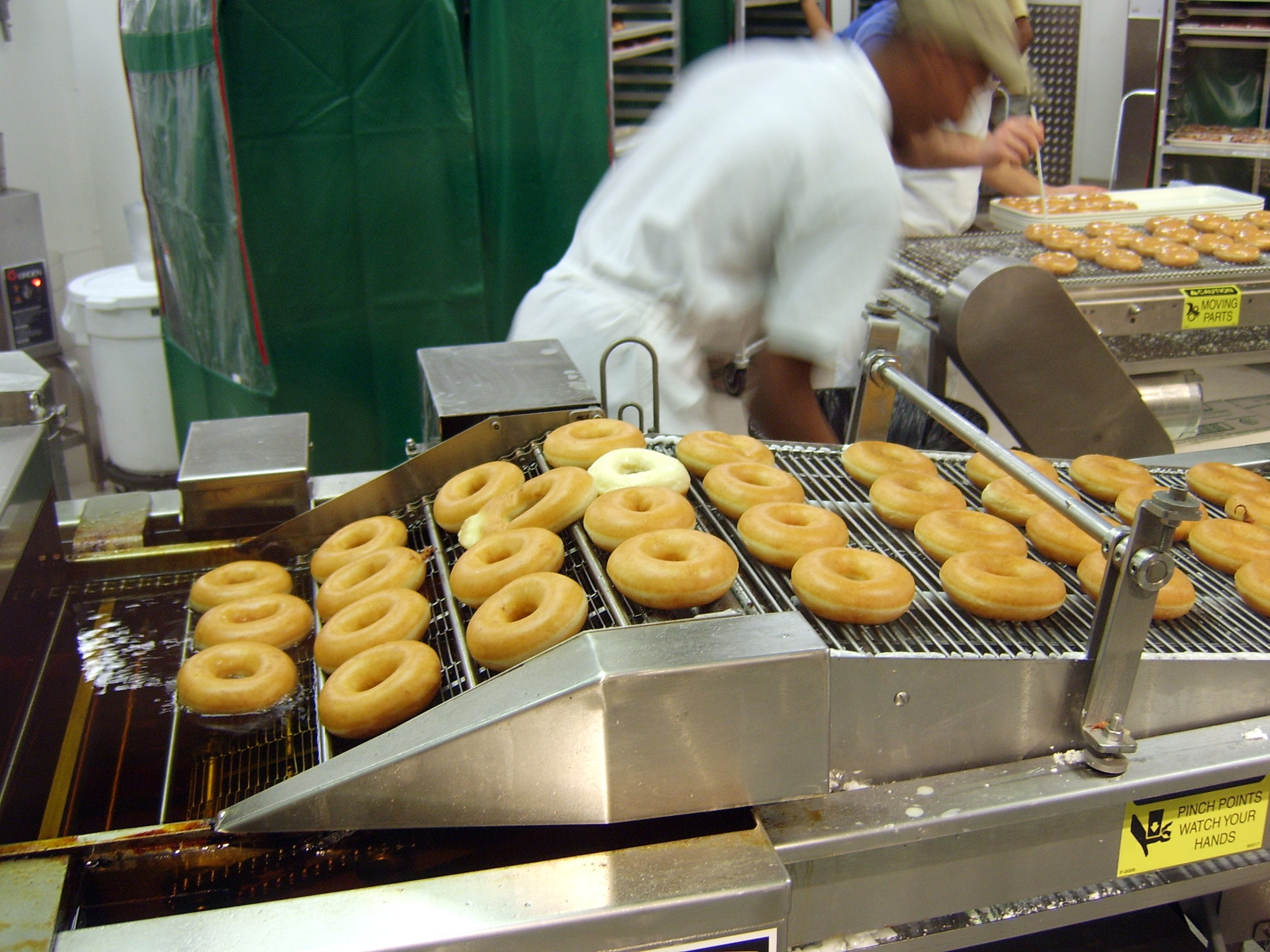
Krispy Kreme doughnuts being prepared on an automated production line

A doughnut shop or donut shop is an establishment that specializes in the preparation and retail sales of doughnuts. A doughnut is a type of fried dough pastry, deep-fried from a flour dough, and typically either ring-shaped or without a hole and often filled.

Many doughnut shops, such as U.S. and Canadian national chains, serve coffee as an accompaniment to doughnuts, thus they can also be classified as coffee shops. However, a doughnut shop tends to be more casual and serve lower-end fare which also facilitates take-out and drive-through which is popular in those countries, compared to a coffee shop or cafe which provides more gourmet pastries and beverages such as espresso, latte, americano and cappuccino.

== History ==
Doughnuts in their proper form were introduced by Dutch settlers to New Amsterdam (now New York) as olykoek ("oil cake") in the early 18th century. These doughnuts closely resembled later ones but did not yet have their current ring shape. Some historians believe that recipes brought by English settlers served as a catalyst for the modern donut rather than Dutch olykoeks. The ring shape traces its origin to the mid-19th century and is often attributed to Hanson Gregory, a New England ship captain, and his mother. Doughnuts came into their own and became closely associated with the United States during World War I, when millions of American doughboys in France were served doughnuts by Salvation Army woman volunteers to evoke a sense of home. In World War II, the American Red Cross brought 1.6 million doughnuts and coffee to U.S. soldiers stationed in Europe and the Pacific to boost morale.

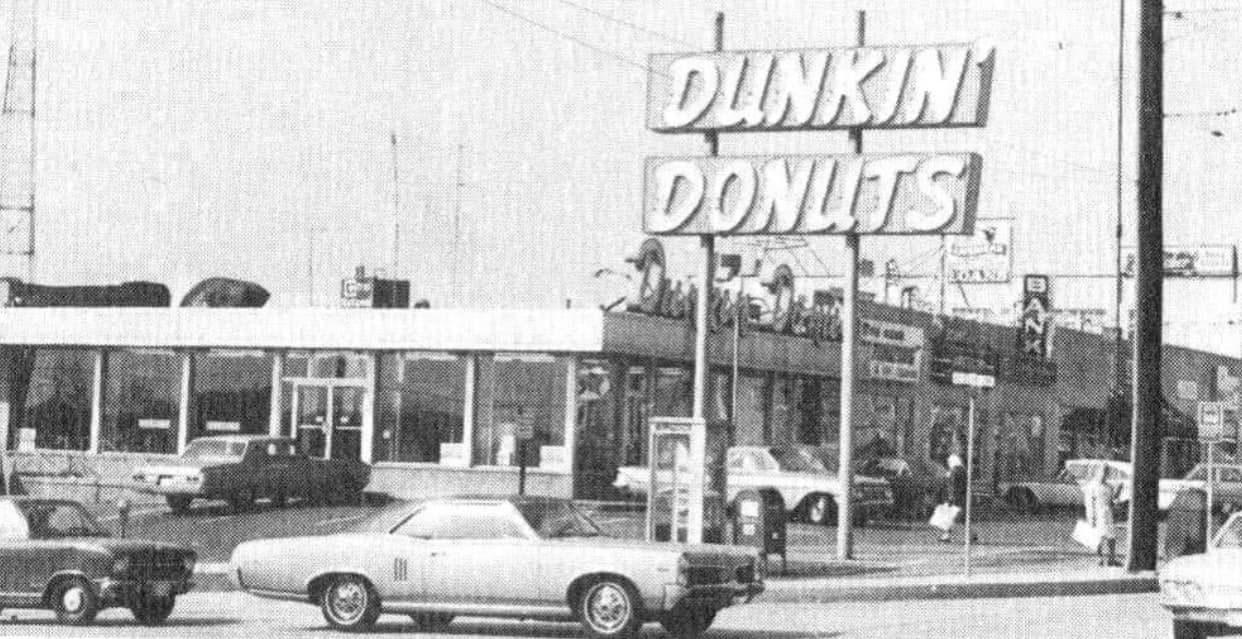
A Dunkin' Donuts store in Wheaton, Maryland, c. 1967.

Doughnut shops remained niche until the until the late 19th century, when the invention of the doughnut cutter made ring-shaped doughnuts practical and popular. The first automated doughnut machine, founded in New York City in 1920 by Russian refugee Adolph Levitt, significantly increased production by automatically cutting and frying doughnuts. Levitt founded the Doughnut Corporation of America—which later started the National Dunking Association—and opened the Mayflower donut shop in Times Square in 1931. The doughnut machine became a public spectacle at the 1933–1934 Chicago World's Fair as the "food hit of the Century of Progress." This innovation fueled rapid growth, leading to the widespread popularity of doughnut shops across the United States in the mid-20th century, solidifying doughnuts as a quintessentially American food. Major chains emerged during this period, notably the North Carolina-based Krispy Kreme in 1937, which was known for its large windows enabling customers to witness doughnut production, and the Massachusetts-based Dunkin' Donuts in 1950. Canada also became known for its doughnut shops, with its most famous chain being Tim Hortons; founded in 1964. They continued to expand throughout North America and internationally throughout the 20th and 21st centuries.

== Overview ==
=== Canada ===
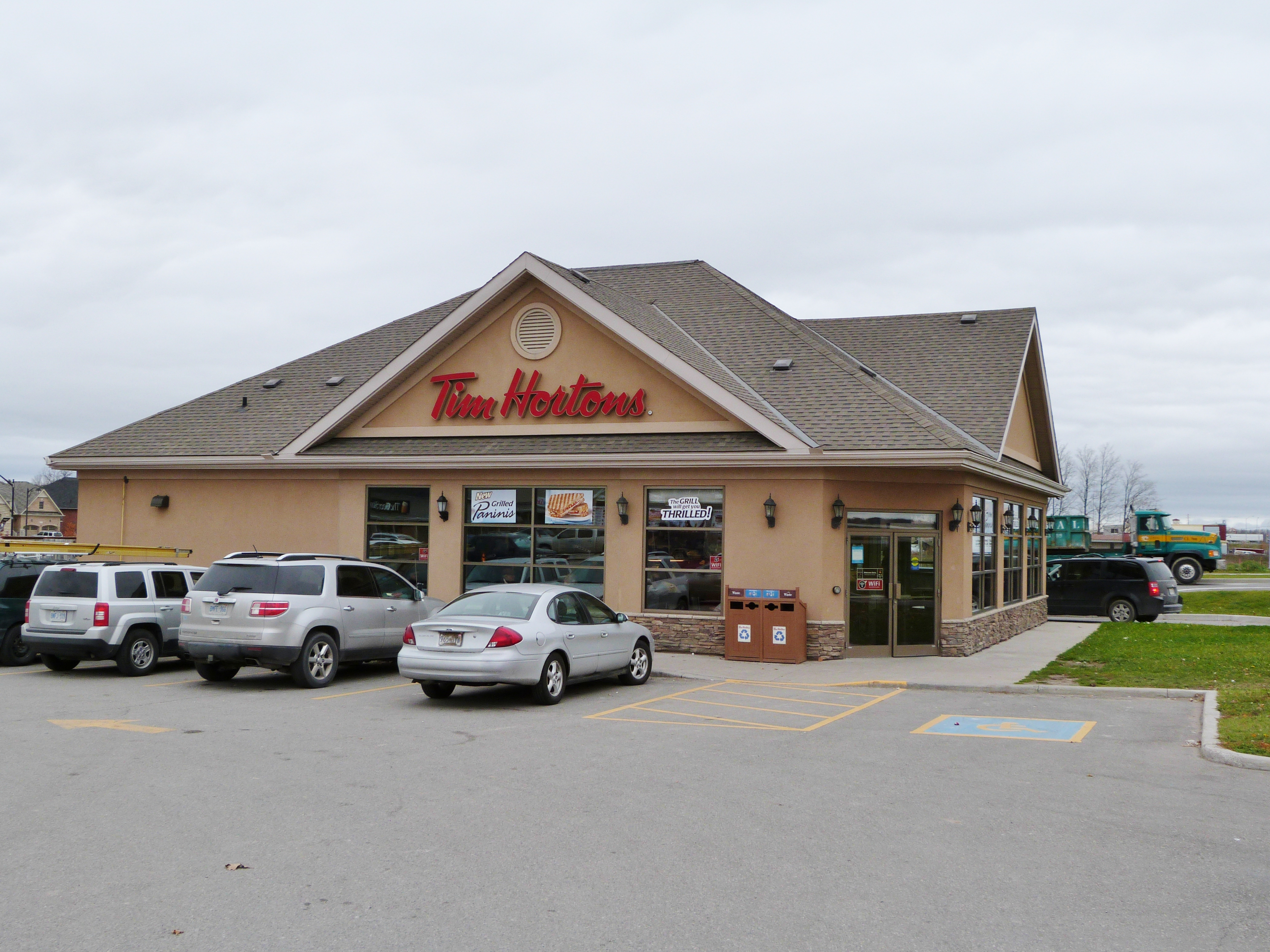
A Tim Hortons restaurant in Schomberg, Ontario, Canada

Doughnut shops have been described as common in Canada and as a "national institution", and doughnuts have been described as an "unofficial national food." Per capita, the largest concentration of doughnut shops in the world exist in Canada, and Japan has the second-highest concentration per capita. Per capita, Canadians eat the most doughnuts compared to all world countries. The large number of Tim Hortons restaurants in Canada (over 4,600) significantly contributes to this consumption rate.

=== United States ===
Within the United States, the Providence metropolitan area was cited as having the most doughnut shops per capita (25.3 doughnut shops per 100,000 people) as of January 13, 2010.

== Listing ==
The following is a list of notable doughnut shops (i.e. shops whose doughnut sales have been the subject of significant coverage in reliable, independent sources).

Name	Founded	Country	Description
Allie's Donuts	1968	(United States)	Doughnut store in North Kingstown, Rhode Island, United States
BeaverTails	1978	(Canada)	Founded in Killaloe, Ontario (1978), the company's headquarters are in Montreal, Quebec, Canada.
Bess Eaton	1953	(United States)	Founded in 1953 by Angelo (Bangy) Gencarelli Jr. and was known for its coffee and hand-cut donuts. The corporate headquarters were located in Westerly, Rhode Island, with up to 56 retail shops spread between Rhode Island, Massachusetts, and Connecticut. At one time, it was Rhode Island's seventh largest private employer of 750 workers and 650 workers when it was sold.
Big Apple Donuts and Coffee	2007	(Malaysia)	Cafe retailer in Malaysia specializing in donuts and coffee. The company is owned and managed by Big Apple Interasia.
Café du Monde	1862	(United States)	Coffee shop on Decatur Street in the French Quarter in New Orleans. It is best known for its café au lait and its French-style beignets.
Cardigan Donuts	2017	(United States)	Minneapolis chain featuring daily made doughnuts, available in three, tiered varieties. The restaurant has two locations in the Minneapolis Skyway System.
Churromania	1997	(Venezuela)	Venezuelan chain of churro stores founded by Ariel Acosta Rubio and his wife, Maria Alejandra Bravo, in 1997. The company is based in Miami, Florida, and has more than 120 franchises in six countries.
Coffee Time	1982	(Canada)	Chain of Canadian coffee shops that has its headquarters in Toronto, Ontario. It was founded in 1982 in Bolton, Ontario.
Country Style	1963	(Canada)	Fast/casual chain of coffee shops operating primarily in the Canadian province of Ontario (where it ranks second among coffee chains)
Dawn Donuts	1958	(United States)	A doughnut chain begun in Flint, Michigan. Although most of the chain was sold to Dunkin' Donuts in 1991, the bakery for the company's donuts remains operational, as do two locations in the Flint area.
Daylight Donuts	1954	(United States)	A chain with about 1000 stores, founded by Tommy and Lucille Day in Tulsa, Oklahoma.
The Donut Hole	1963	(United States)	Bakery and landmark in La Puente, California. An example of programmatic architecture, the building is shaped like two giant donuts through which customers drive to place their orders. The bakery is one of the most photographed donut shops in the United States.
Donut King	1981	(Australia)	Australia's largest doughnut franchise, based on the Gold Coast, Queensland. There are over 360 franchised locations.
Donut Wheel	1962	(United States)	Donut shop in Livermore, California, an example of Googie architecture.
Duck Donuts	2006	(United States)	Founded in Duck, North Carolina with 87 locations in the United States, primarily on the east coast.
Dunkin' Donuts (Dunkin')	1950	(United States)	Founded in 1950 and now based in Canton, Massachusetts, the company has grown to become one of the largest coffee and baked goods chains in the world, with 11,000 restaurants in 33 different countries.
Five Daughters Bakery	2015	(United States)	Doughnut shop chain with 6 locations in the United States.
Go Nuts Donuts	2003	(Philippines)	Doughnut shop chain based in the Philippines with its headquarters in Manila. It is also referred to as "The Manny Pacquiao of the Donut World."
Honey Dew Donuts	1973	(United States)	Plainville, Massachusetts–based franchise selling donuts and other breakfast foods. It was founded on Church St. in Mansfield by Richard J. Bowen in 1973.
J.CO Donuts	2005	(Indonesia)	Cafe retailer in Indonesia specializing in doughnuts, coffee and frozen yogurt. It was founded in 2005 and its headquarters is in Jakarta, Indonesia.
Krispy Kreme	1937	(United States)	American global doughnut company and coffeehouse chain based in Winston-Salem, North Carolina. It was founded on July 13, 1937. See also: Krispy Kreme UK and Krispy Kreme operations by country.
LaMar's Donuts	1933	(United States)	Chain of gourmet doughnut bistros founded in Kansas City, Missouri, and headquartered in Denver, Colorado. LaMar's has 25 stores in five states—Arizona, Colorado, Kansas, Missouri, and Nebraska.
Leonard's Bakery	1952	(United States)	Well known purveyor of Malasadas in Honolulu
Long's Bakery	1951	(United States)	Has been named one of the best donut shops in the US multiple times by national publications. Famous for their glazed yeast donuts.
Mighty-O Donuts	2000	(United States)	Seattle, Washington wholesaler and retail coffeehouse donut shop making GMO-free, zero trans fat, vegan, organic donuts.
Mister Donut	1956	(Japan)	Fast food franchise founded in the United States in 1956, now headquartered in Japan, where it has more than 1,300 stores. The primary offerings include doughnuts, coffee, muffins and pastries.
Mmmuffins	1979	(Canada)	Canadian coffee and muffin retailer founded in 1979. It granted its first franchise in 1980. The company, which has locations throughout Canada, is one of the largest specialty baked goods franchising companies in Canada.
Mochinut	2020	(United States)	Chain with over 148 locations as of 2023. Specializes in Korean hotdogs and mochi donuts.
Round Rock Donuts	1926	(United States)	Doughnut store in Round Rock, Texas, United States
Psycho Donuts	2009	(United States)	Doughnut shop in Campbell, California, owned by Jordan Zweigoron and opened in March 2009. The theme of the shop is "craziness": it specializes in unusual donut flavors and many donuts' names are puns on mental illnesses or other mental health conditions, and the store's decorations include a straitjacket and padded cell. It has been the subject of controversy because mental health advocates claim its theme promotes negative stereotypes of people with mental illnesses.
Randy's Donuts	1953	(United States)	Bakery and landmark building in Inglewood, California, that opened in 1953. The building is a style that dates to a period in the early 20th century that saw a proliferation of programmatic architecture throughout Southern California. The building has a giant doughnut on the roof of an otherwise ordinary drive-in that is a dedicated doughnut bakery. There were 10 locations, built over the course of the 1950s. Only one remains, which is located at 805 West Manchester Avenue. At least four other big donuts survive, under different company names.
Robin's Donuts	1975	(Canada)	Large Canadian chain of over 130 doughnut shops that operate in Canada. The first store opened in 1975 in Thunder Bay, Ontario.
Shipley; Do-Nuts	1936	(United States)	American doughnut chain with more than 250 franchised stores located in the states of Texas, Louisiana, Arkansas, Tennessee, Mississippi, and Alabama. Its headquarters is located at Northside, Houston, Texas. The chain originated in Houston, in the 1940s after selling direct by wholesale since 1936.
Spudnut Shops	1940	(United States)	Former American franchise chain that retailed potato flour doughnuts called Spudnuts. The parent company no longer exists, but independent stores remain. The original recipe is based on a folk recipe that traces back to Germany. The company was founded in 1940. In 1946, the company began establishing a nationwide chain of franchised Spudnut Shops. By 1949, over 225 Spudnut Shops existed across the United States.
SuzyQ Doughnuts	2012	(Canada)	Small doughnut shop chain located in Ottawa, Ontario. Serves doughnuts based on a recipe for cardamom-spiced Finnish pastries.
Tim Hortons	1964	(Canada)	Canadian multinational fast casual restaurant known for its coffee and doughnuts. It is also Canada's largest fast food service; at the end of 2013, it had 4,592 restaurants in Canada, 807 in the United States, and 38 in the Persian Gulf region. It was founded in 1964 in Hamilton, Ontario by Canadian ice hockey player Tim Horton and Jim Charade, after an initial venture in hamburger restaurants.
Top Pot Doughnuts	2002	(United States)	Chain of coffee and doughnut cafes started in the Capitol Hill neighborhood of Seattle, Washington. Top Pot began in February 2002 and was started by co-founders Mark and Michael Klebeck, who are brothers.
Voodoo Doughnut	2003	(United States)	Independent doughnut shops founded and headquartered in Portland, Oregon; known for: eclectic doughnut and shop decorations, signature pink boxes, year-round downtown Portland line-ups, hipster staff, and occasional on-site weddings. Shops are located in Portland, Eugene, Denver, Colorado, Dallas, Texas and Taipei.
Winchell's Donuts	1948	(United States)	International doughnut company founded by Verne Winchell on October 8, 1948, in Temple City, California. It is now headquartered in City of Industry, California. As of 2006, there are over 170 stores in 12 western states, as well as Guam, Saipan, and Saudi Arabia. Several stores also operated in Nagoya, Japan in the past, with most stores located inside the UNY supermarkets, as Uny Co., Ltd. was the master franchise holder in Japan.
World's Best Donuts	1969	(United States)	Doughnut shop and American restaurant in Grand Marais, Minnesota. It is an independent family-owned business that was established in 1969. The company has received accolades from various sources for having quality doughnuts.
Yum-Yum Donuts	1971	(United States)	Chain of doughnut shops based in California with 71 locations. In 2004, Yum-Yum Donuts purchased Winchell's Donuts, but continues to operate Winchell's shops under their historic name. The headquarters for both chains are in the City of Industry, California.

Doughnut shops

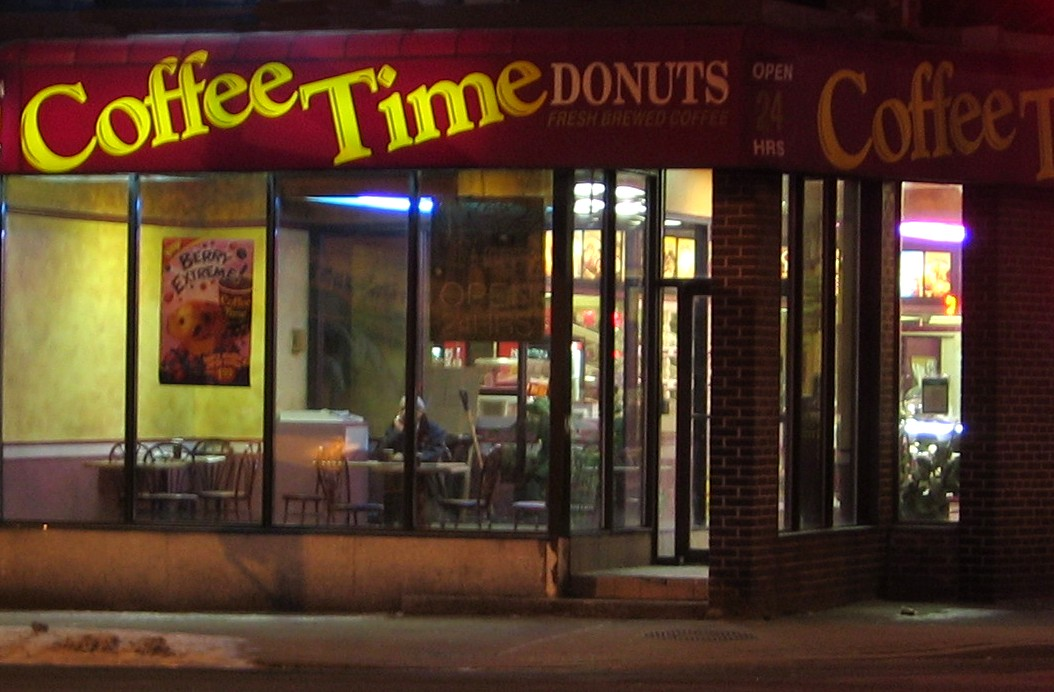
A Coffee Time restaurant in Bloordale Village, Toronto

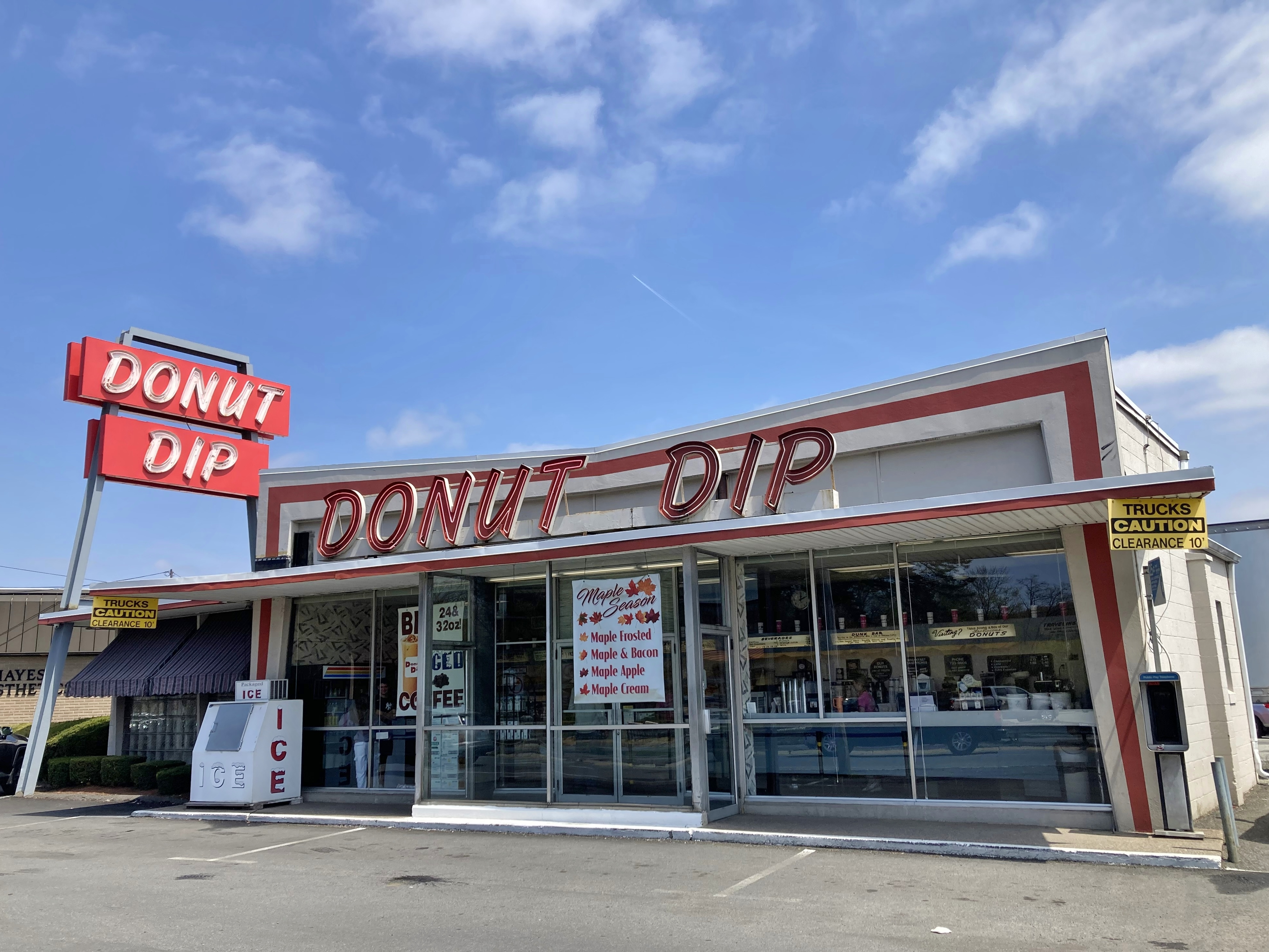
Donut Dip's iconic 1957 building, located in West Springfield, Massachusetts

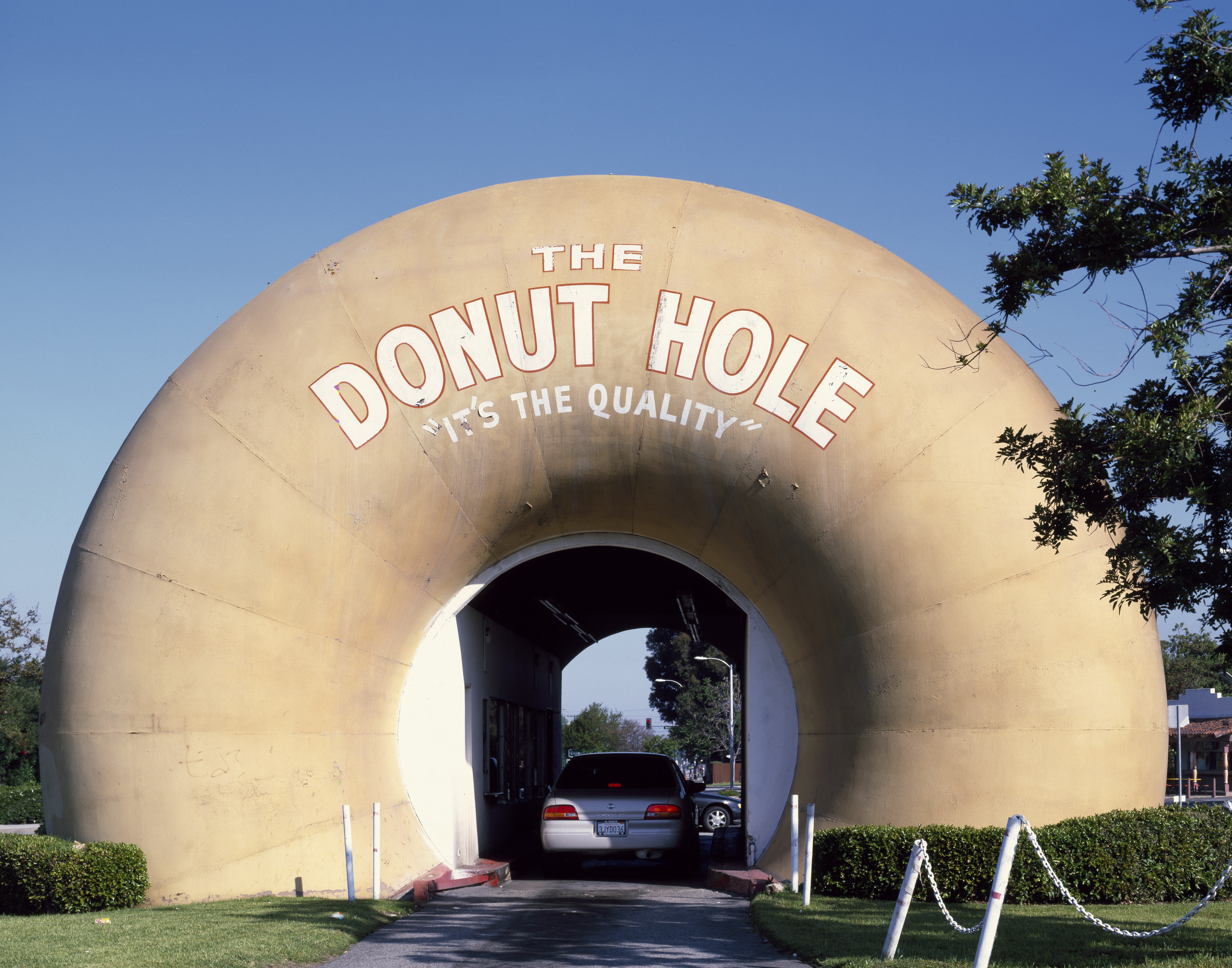
The entrance to The Donut Hole, located in La Puente, California

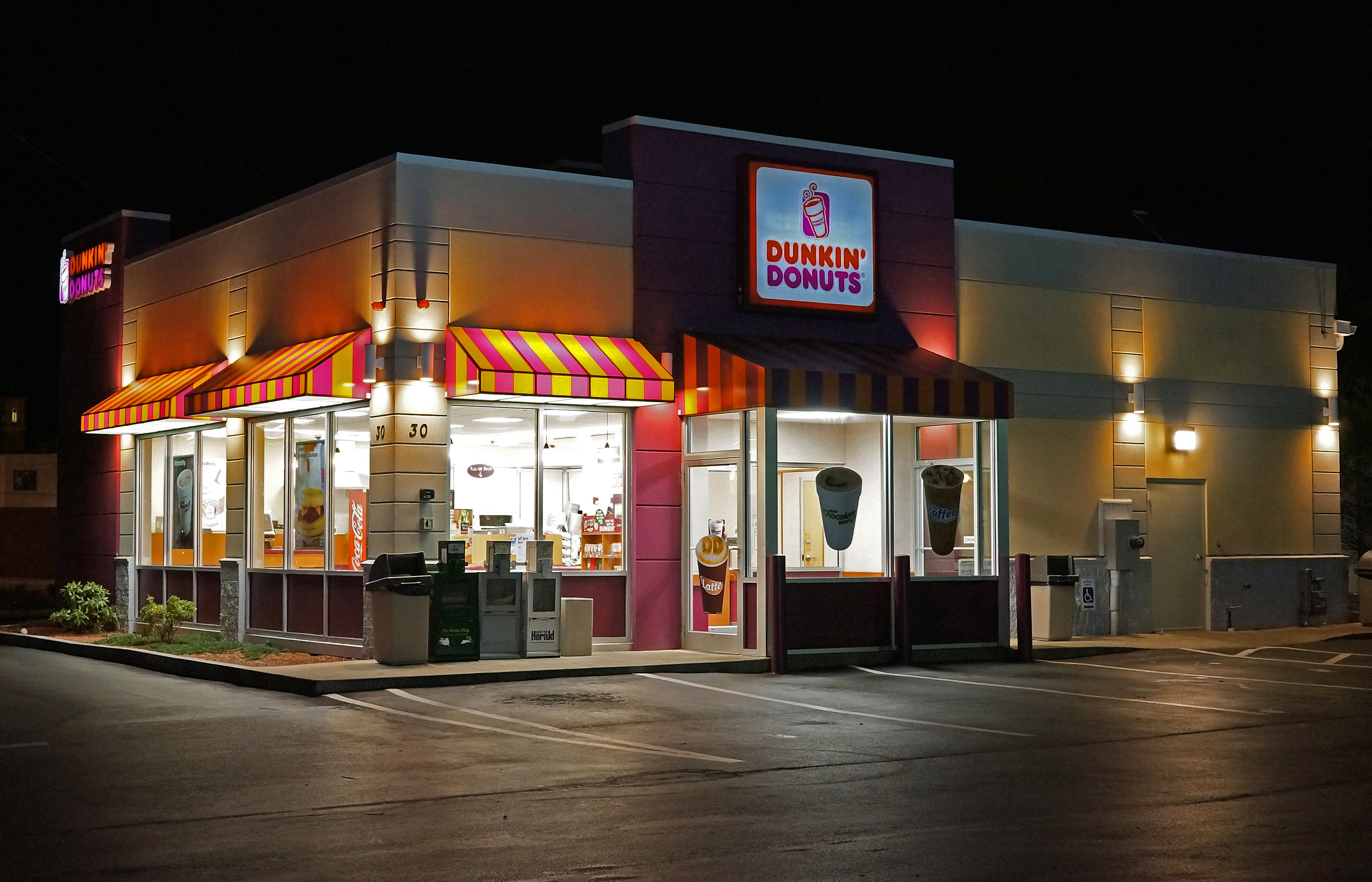
A Dunkin' Donuts restaurant in Revere, Massachusetts

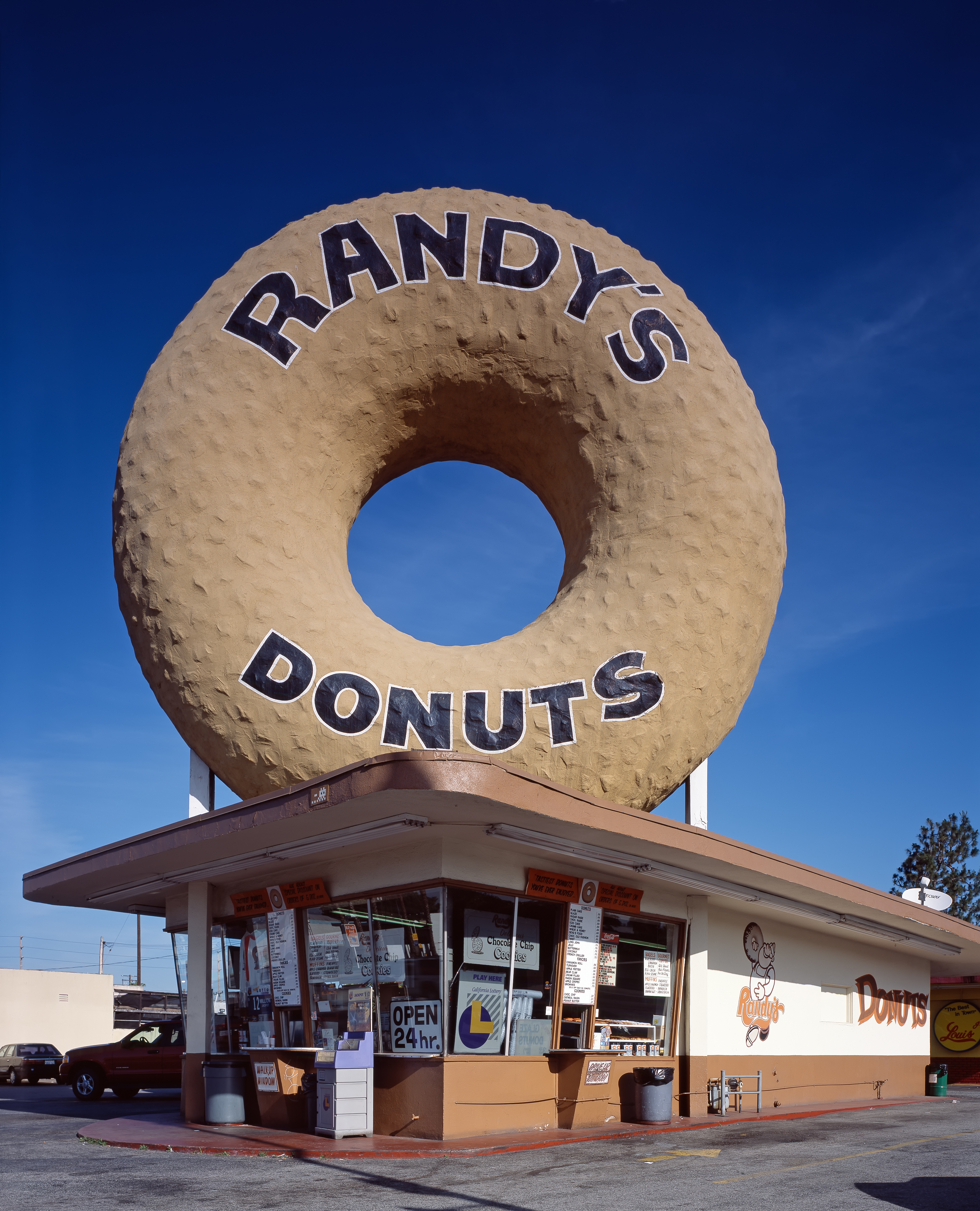
Randy's Donuts, a doughnut shop and landmark building in Inglewood, California

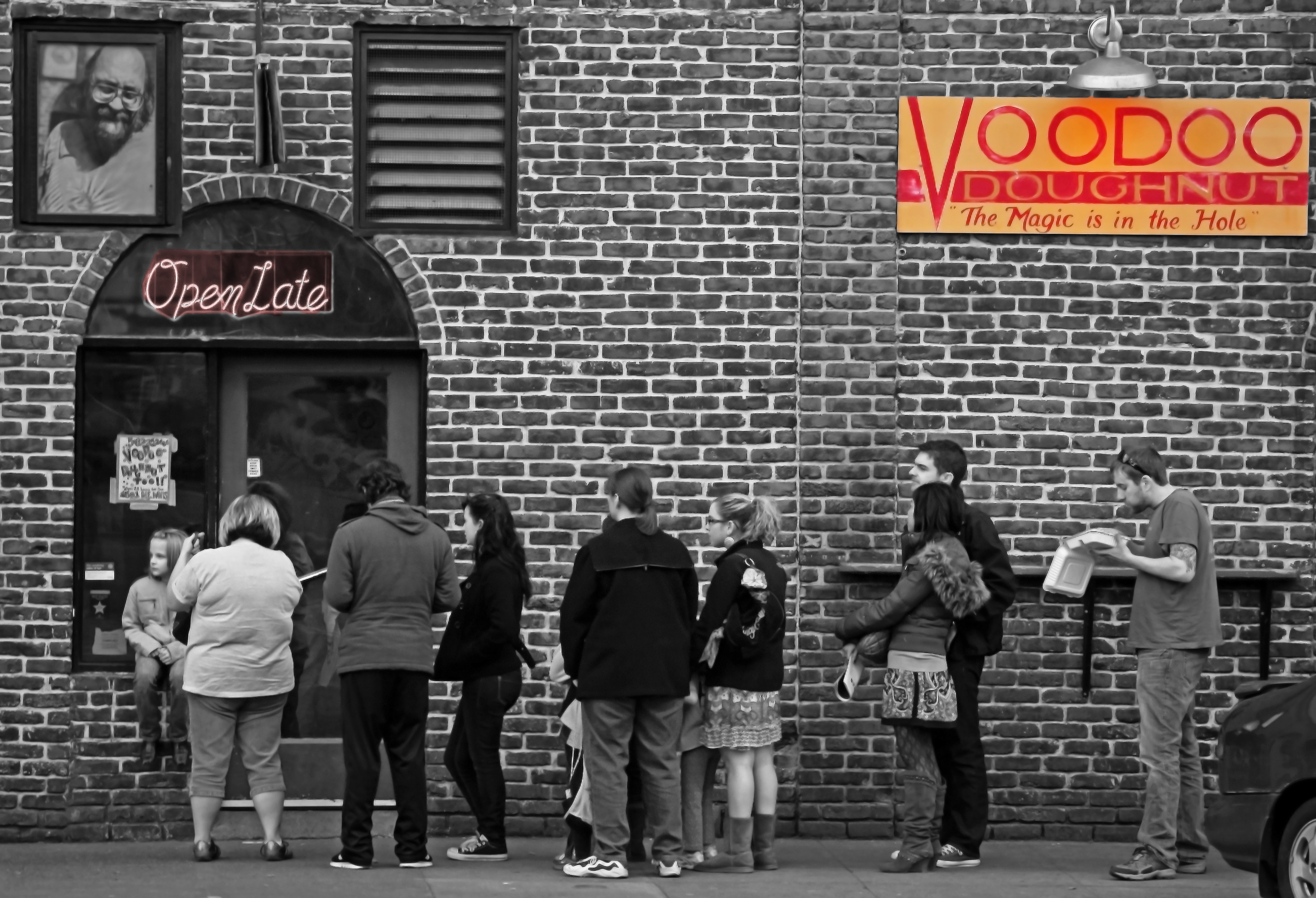
The line in front of Voodoo Doughnut in Portland, Oregon

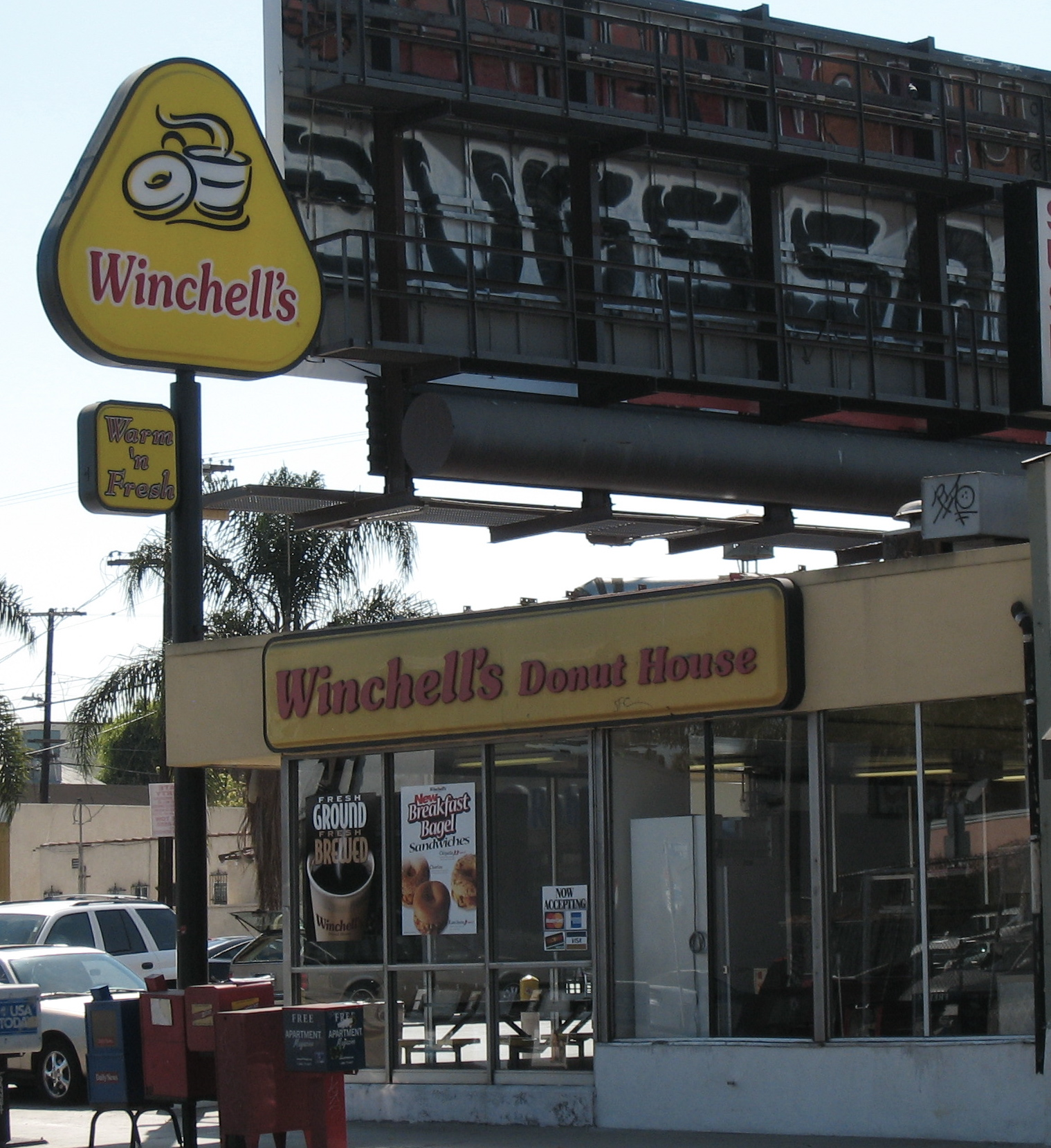
A Winchell's Donuts restaurant on Melrose Avenue in Los Angeles

== See also ==
- Big donuts of Southern California
- List of bakeries
- List of coffeehouse chains
- List of doughnut varieties
- List of fried dough foods
- Lists of restaurants
- National Doughnut Day
- Pie shop
