= Five Daughters (disambiguation) =

Five Daughters may refer to:

- Five Daughters, a British television drama mini-series
- Five Daughters Bakery, a family-owned bakery with six locations in the USA (Tennessee, Georgia and Florida)
- Mother Fist and Her Five Daughters, the third studio album by the British singer-songwriter Marc Almond
- Our Five Daughters, a daytime soap opera that ran on NBC from January 2 to September 28, 1962
- Widower with Five Daughters, a 1957 West German comedy film
