= Donnie's Donuts =

Restaurant information
- Closed: 2024
- Location: United States

Donnie's Donuts was a donut restaurant based in Daytona Beach, Florida, United States. Chef Tyler Florence visited a shop to film for The Extra Mile in 2019. The business closed permanently in 2024.

Donnie's was selected to represent Florida in a 2024 Yelp list of the best donuts in each U.S. state.

== See also ==
- List of doughnut shops
