= J.CO Donuts =

Indonesian cafe restaurant chain

J.CO Donuts & Coffee
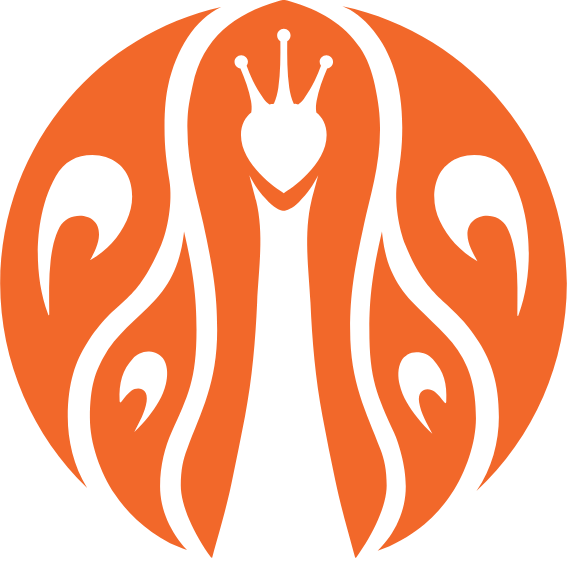
- Logo used since 2020

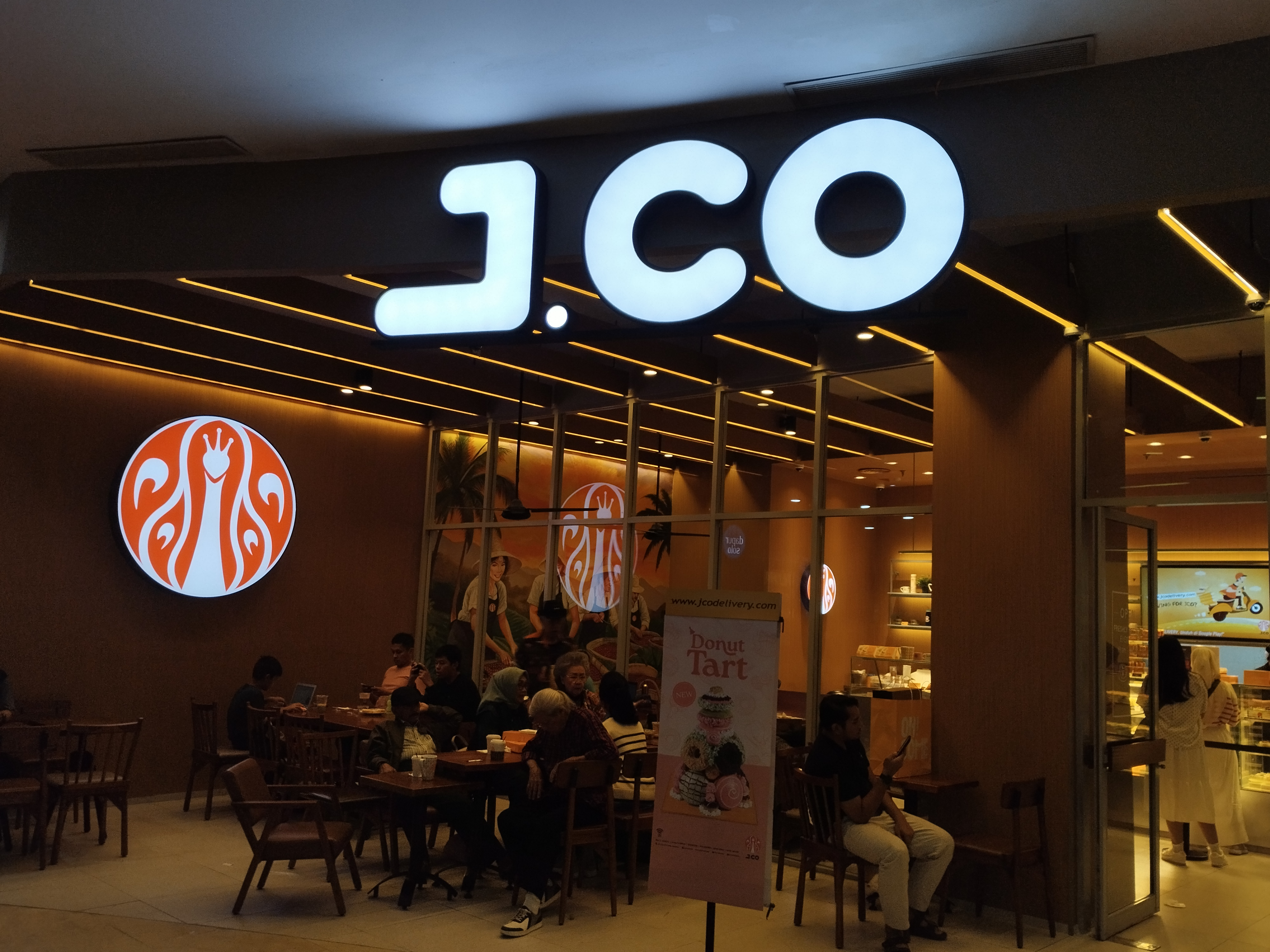
- J.CO Donuts branch in Bintaro Jaya Xchange Mall, South Tangerang, Indonesia
- Type: Private
- Industry: Coffee shop Donut shop
- Founded: 26 June 2005; 21 years ago in Lippo Karawaci, Tangerang, Indonesia
- Founder: Johnny Andrean
- Headquarters: Jakarta, Indonesia
- Area served: Indonesia; Singapore; Malaysia; Philippines; Saudi Arabia; Hong Kong
- Products: Coffee; Donuts; Frozen yogurt
- Parent: Johnny Andrean Group
- Website: jcodonuts.com

J.CO Donuts & Coffee is an Indonesian cafe restaurant chain that specializes in donuts, coffee and frozen yogurt. The company is owned and managed by Johnny Andrean Group.

== History ==
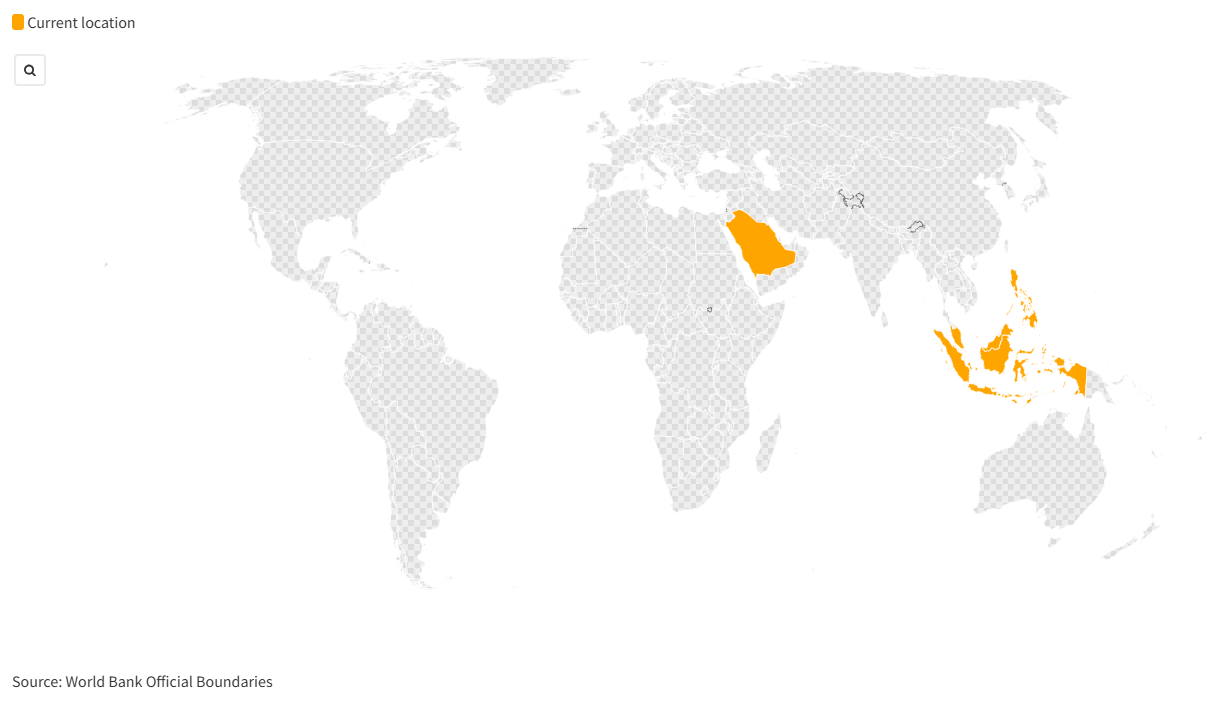
JCO Locations displayed with their countries

The first J.CO opened on 26 June 2005. By its eighth year, J.CO had 120 outlets in Indonesia, 12 in Malaysia and the Philippines, four in Singapore and two in Hong Kong. As of 2025, J.CO operated 236 stores in Indonesia, Malaysia, Singapore, Philippines and Hong Kong.

== Products ==
=== Donuts ===
J.CO's donut flavors are either named using eponyms or word plays such as puns. One example is, Alcapone, the most popular donut flavor, inspired by the most-wanted Italian American gangster Al Capone.

==== Flavors ====
As of 2017, they have launched over 45 flavors, some of which are inspired by local tastes, such as their kaya donut and kurma donut.

=== Other products ===
Some complementary products they sell include J.CRONUT (croissant donuts), J.POPS (mini bite-size donuts), J.CLUB (donut sandwiches), J.COOL (frozen yogurt), and gourmet selections of pastries, sandwiches and salads. The J.COFFEE line features a variety of coffee beverages ranging from the classics to iced blends.

== Gallery ==
Former J.CO Donuts logo used until 2020

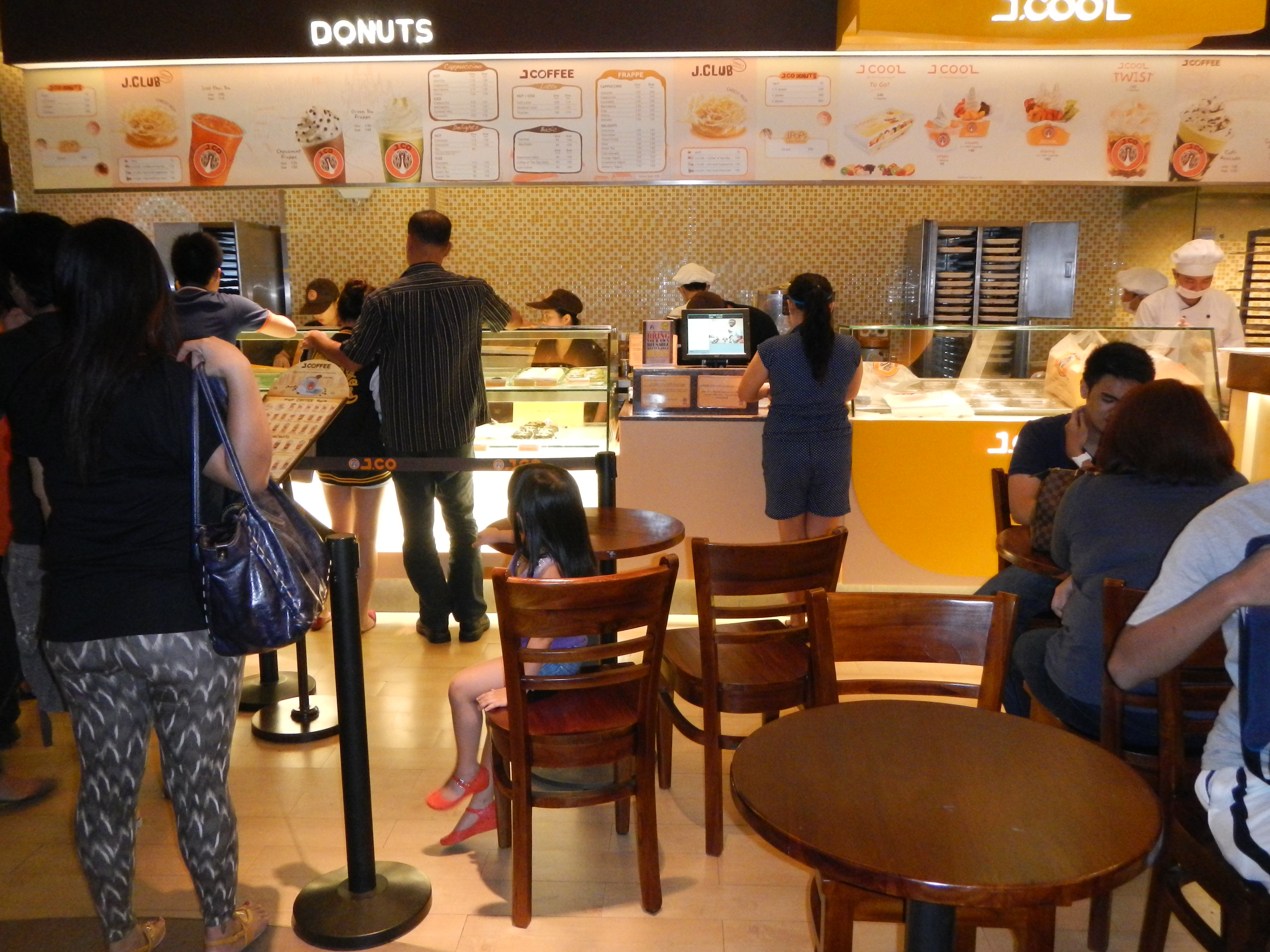
J.CO Donuts branch in TriNoma, Quezon City, Philippines

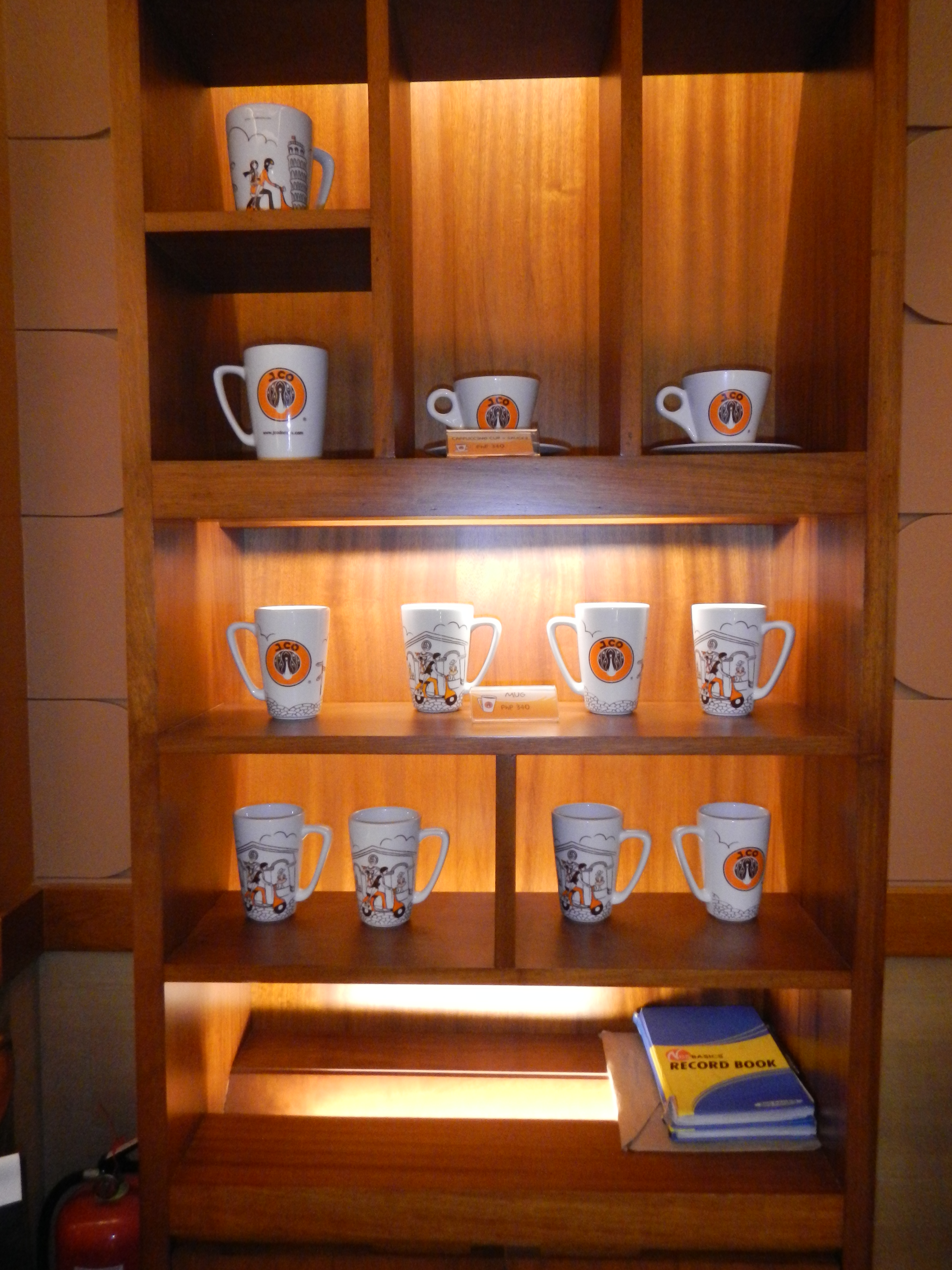
J.CO mugs

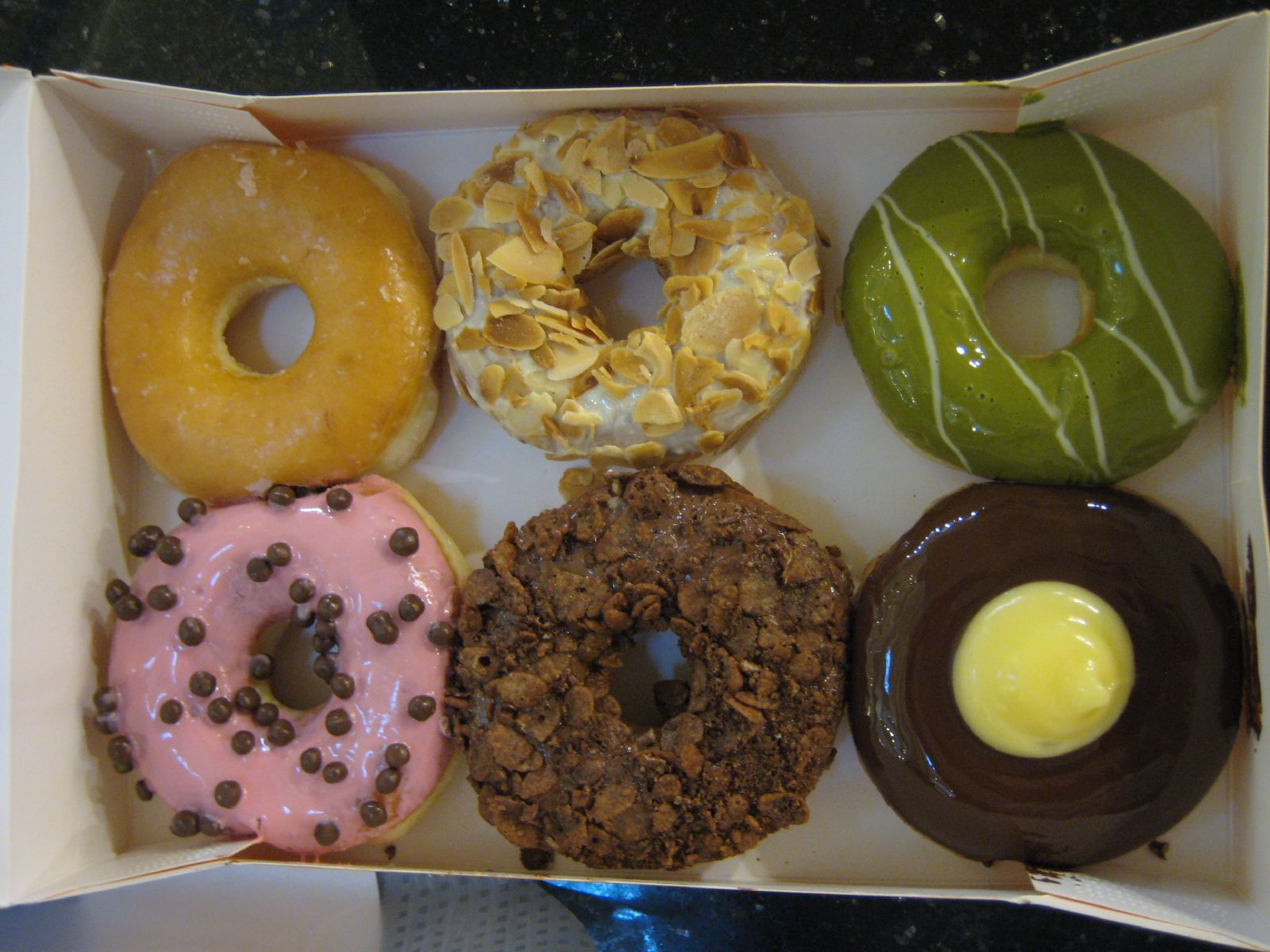
A box of half-dozen donuts

== See also ==
- List of coffeehouse chains
