= Donut Wheel =

Doughnut shop in California

Coordinates: 37.680821°N 121.770823°W

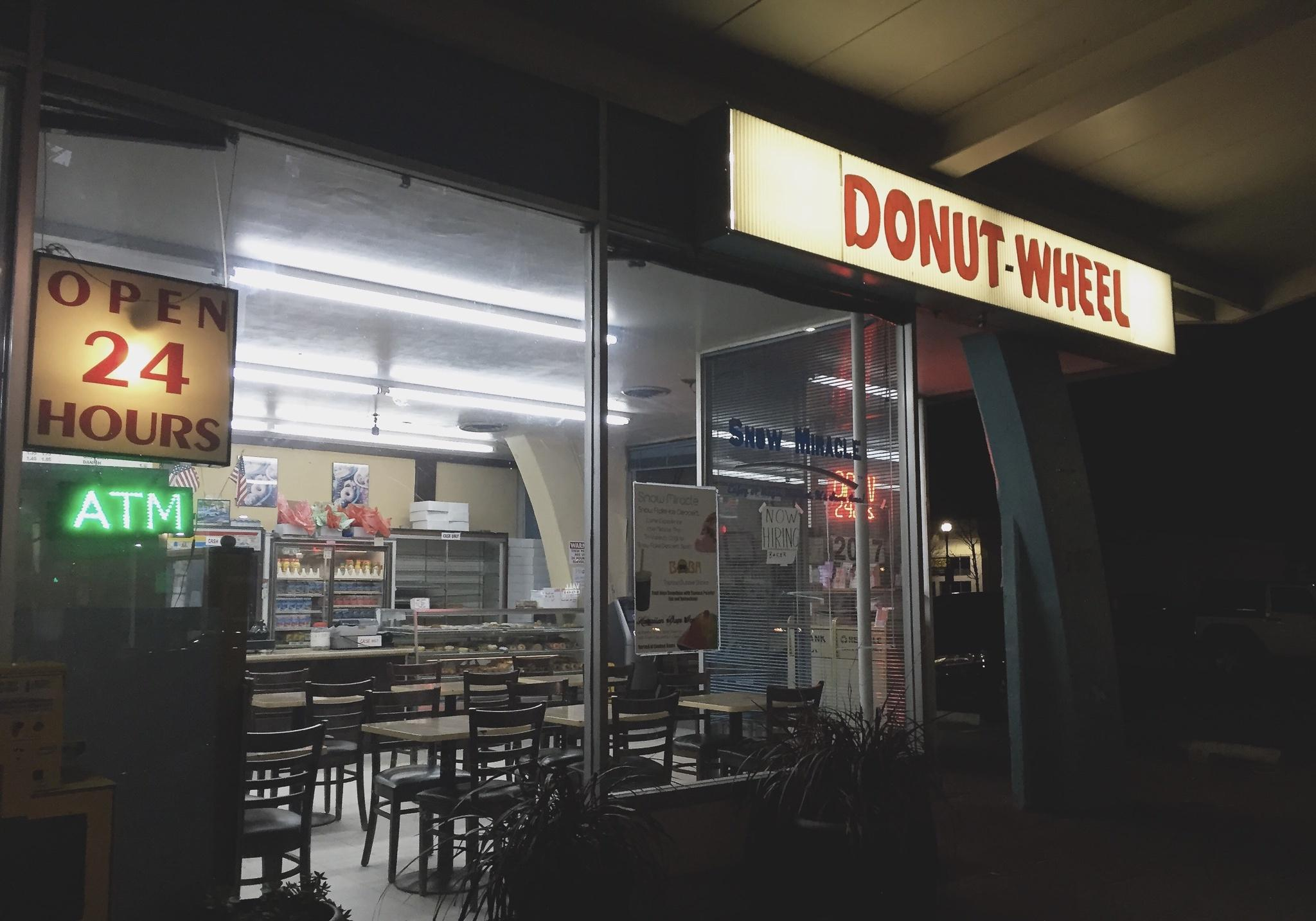
- Interactive map of Donut Wheel

Restaurant information
- Established: 1962; 64 years ago
- Location: 2017 First St, Livermore, California

Donut Wheel is a doughnut shop. It was established in 1962, and is a landmark in Livermore, California. It is located at the intersection of the city's four quadrants.

The Donut Wheel (then "Jack's Donut Wheel") was started in 1962 by Jack and Jean Weil, the same year they moved to Livermore from San Francisco. The Donut Wheel got its name from a suggestion from a man who worked with Jack at Stemple's. He said that he should call it the Donut Wheel because that is how people pronounced his name, “wheel” instead of Weil (pronounced, "while"). Jack and Jean sold Jack's Donut Wheel in 1972. Since then it has changed hands a few times, but kept the name.

The building was erected in 1941, as a Purity grocery store. It was remodeled in 1958 by Hans J. Schiller, and is an example of Googie architecture. Schiller was a German architect who remodeled 80 Purity stores throughout California, having fled Nazi Germany to Mandatory Palestine and then established himself in Marin County after World War II. Before the grocery store, the site was occupied by an 1800s building called the Washington Hotel.

The building is single-storied and is shaped like a large Quonset hut with a zig-zag concrete roof extending off of the long side, facing a parking lot. It has large rectangular-shaped windows.

It is currently managed by Savanna Taing, the daughter of previous owners Mary Naryung Tang and Mok Kim Tang, who immigrated to the United States from Cambodia in 1987. They learned donut-making from relatives who worked at Bob's Donuts in Palo Alto, California
