= Dawn Donuts =

Chain food company

- Industry: retail
- Founded: 1958; 68 years ago
- Founder: Arthur Hurand
- Headquarters: Jackson, Michigan, United States
- Number of locations: 1
- Area served: Michigan
- Key people: Eugene Worden and Grover Lutz
- Products: Donuts, coffee

Dawn Donuts is an American doughnut shop. Founded in Flint, Michigan, in 1958, the chain expanded throughout the state of Michigan throughout the 1990s until its purchase by Dunkin' Donuts in 1992. However, the chain's bakery and a number of franchises remained operational after the sale. The last operational Dawn Donuts store is in Grand Blanc, Michigan.

== History ==
Dawn Donuts was founded in Flint by franchise owner Arthur Hurand in 1958 with a store on Detroit Street in Flint, Michigan.

In 1985, the chain unveiled a new store prototype for use at locations inside convenience stores, primarily Amoco gas stations. At this time, the chain consisted of over 60 stores, and was owned by Arthur's son, Gary.

Dunkin' Donuts announced plans to buy the chain in 1991. Most of the locations were converted to Dunkin' Donuts, but that chain also sold the right to the Dawn Donuts name to Dawn Food Products, a Jackson bakery. They also allowed individual franchises to keep the Dawn Donuts name. At the time of the buyout, Dawn Donuts had 59 stores in the state, and all but eight were slated to convert to Dunkin' Donuts. At the time, 23 of the stores were owned by the Hurand family. The conversion doubled Dunkin Donuts' presence in Michigan. Arthur Hurand died in 2012 at age 95.

One of the remaining locations in Flint (on Clio Road) was rebuilt in 2013 as a new store that was combined with a Subway while there were two other Dawn Donut locations in Genesee County that were owned by a different person. The only location that remains open is in Grand Blanc, Michigan.

== See also ==
- List of doughnut shops
