= Daylight Donuts =

American doughnut shop chain

Daylight Donut Flour Company, LLC
- Trade name: Daylight Donuts
- Company type: Subsidiary
- Industry: Food and beverage
- Genre: Doughnut shop
- Founded: 1954; 72 years ago Tulsa, Oklahoma, U.S.
- Founder: Tommy and Lucille Day
- Headquarters: Tulsa, Oklahoma, U.S.
- Number of locations: 950 (2021)
- Key people: John Bond (CEO and President); Sheila Bond (Senior Vice President)
- Products: Raised Doughnuts; Cake Doughnuts; Cinnamon Rolls; Sausage Rolls; Coffee
- Website: daylightdonuts.com

Daylight Donut Flour Company, LLC, doing business as Daylight Donuts, is a privately owned and operated American chain of doughnut shops, founded in 1954 and headquartered in Tulsa, Oklahoma. The chain has approximately 950 locations in 13 countries. Each Daylight Donuts store is independently owned and operated.

== History ==
=== Founding and expansion ===
The origins of Daylight Donuts can be traced back to Tommy and Lucille Day in 1954. The couple opened a small business in Tulsa, Oklahoma and began producing doughnut mix in the mornings and selling them to shops in the afternoon, mostly out of the trunk of their car. The couple created a new doughnut mixture that they believed was more flavorful and had a lighter consistency than many other doughnuts on the market. The couple decided to call this business, "Daylight Donuts Flour Co." Mr. Day, having previously worked in the baking industry, helped a friend, Mr. Durard Pendergraft open a small doughnut shop in Joplin, Missouri on September 22, 1954. The store initially sold doughnuts for 37 cents per dozen.

By 1960, the company had grown enough that the Days were able to hire two new employees and also built a 20,000 square foot facility for additional space. In 1977, the Days retired and sold the company to Jerry and Linda Hull. By this time, there were more than 200 Daylight Donuts stores in operation. Also during this time, the company began using its own fleet of trucks. In 2002, John and Sheila Bond purchased the company. The new owners expanded the production facility into a 65,000 square foot manufacturing facility. They also increased the products that were offered by the company. In 2003, the company started its own private label coffee and began selling it to shop owners.

=== Recent history ===
The original Daylight Donuts location (2124 S. Main Street) was destroyed in the 2011 Joplin tornado and has since relocated to 2316 S. Main Street. As of 2016, Daylight Donuts operates 430 licensed locations where Daylight Donuts are made and over 1,000 locations worldwide where they are sold. Additionally, Daylight Donut Flour Company, LLC produces 230,000 pounds of doughnut mix per week, enough mix for 2.5 million doughnuts weekly. Throughout its entire history, each Daylight Donuts store has been independently owned and operated.

== See also ==
- List of doughnut shops
