= Honey Dew Donuts =

Bakeries of the United States

Honey Dew Associates, Inc.

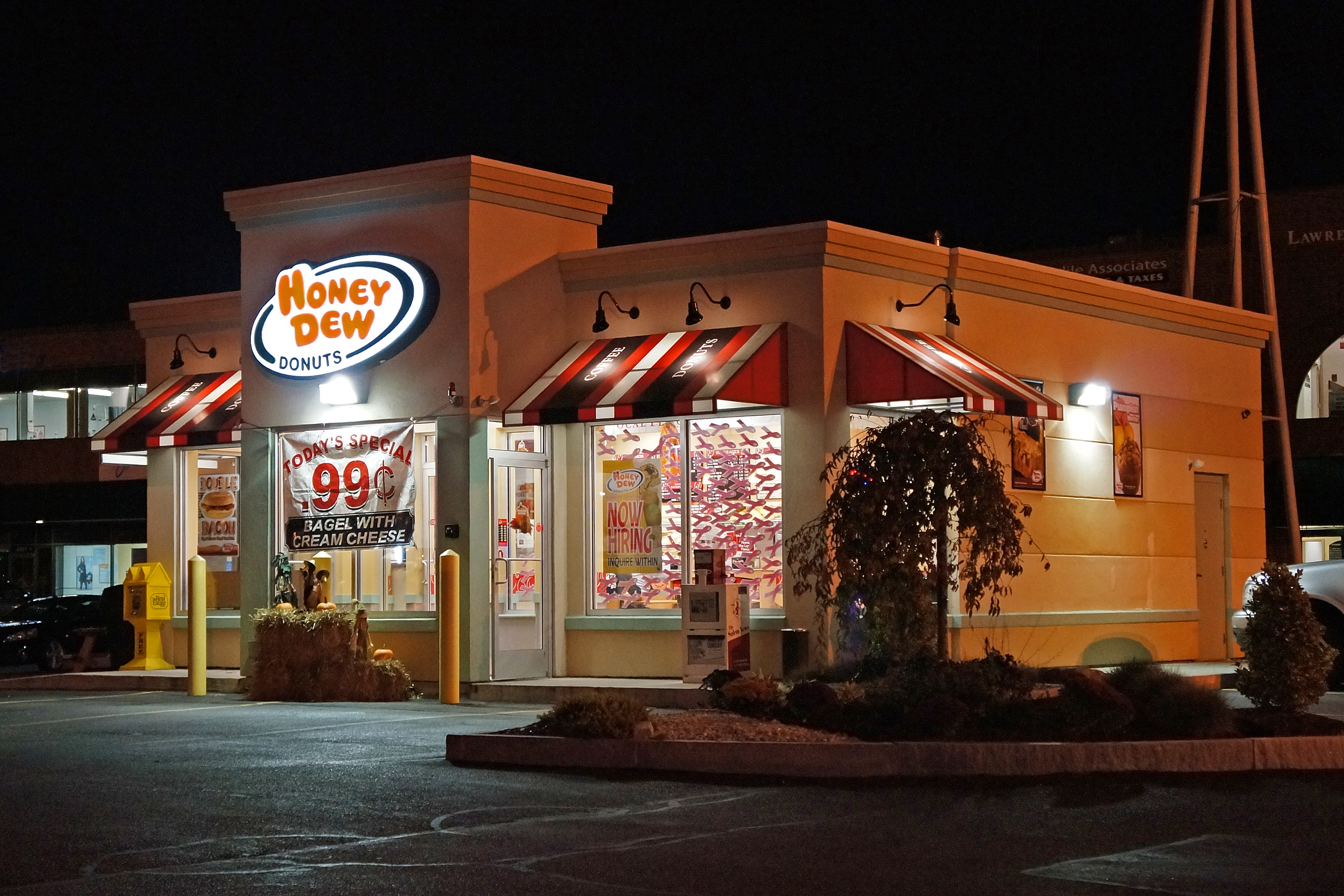
- Honey Dew Donuts in Danvers, Massachusetts
- Trade name: Honey Dew Donuts
- Type: Private
- Industry: Coffeehouse
- Genre: Bakery; Fast food
- Founded: 1973; 53 years ago in Mansfield, Massachusetts, U.S.
- Founder: Richard J. "Dick" Bowen
- Headquarters: Plainville, Massachusetts, United States
- Number of locations: 102
- Area served: New England
- Products: Baked goods, hot beverages, iced beverages, frozen beverages, sandwiches
- Revenue: US$502.1 million (2021)
- Website: www.honeydewdonuts.com

Honey Dew Associates, Inc., doing business as Honey Dew Donuts, is a privately owned and operated Massachusetts-based coffeehouse chain selling donuts and other breakfast foods that operates in New England. The chain is mostly known for its donuts and coffee, but also offers sandwiches, bagels, muffins, and various types of pastries. Honey Dew Donuts opened its first restaurant in 1973 in Mansfield, Massachusetts, and is currently headquartered in Plainville, Massachusetts. As of May 2, 2026 the chain had 102 restaurants in three states.

== History ==
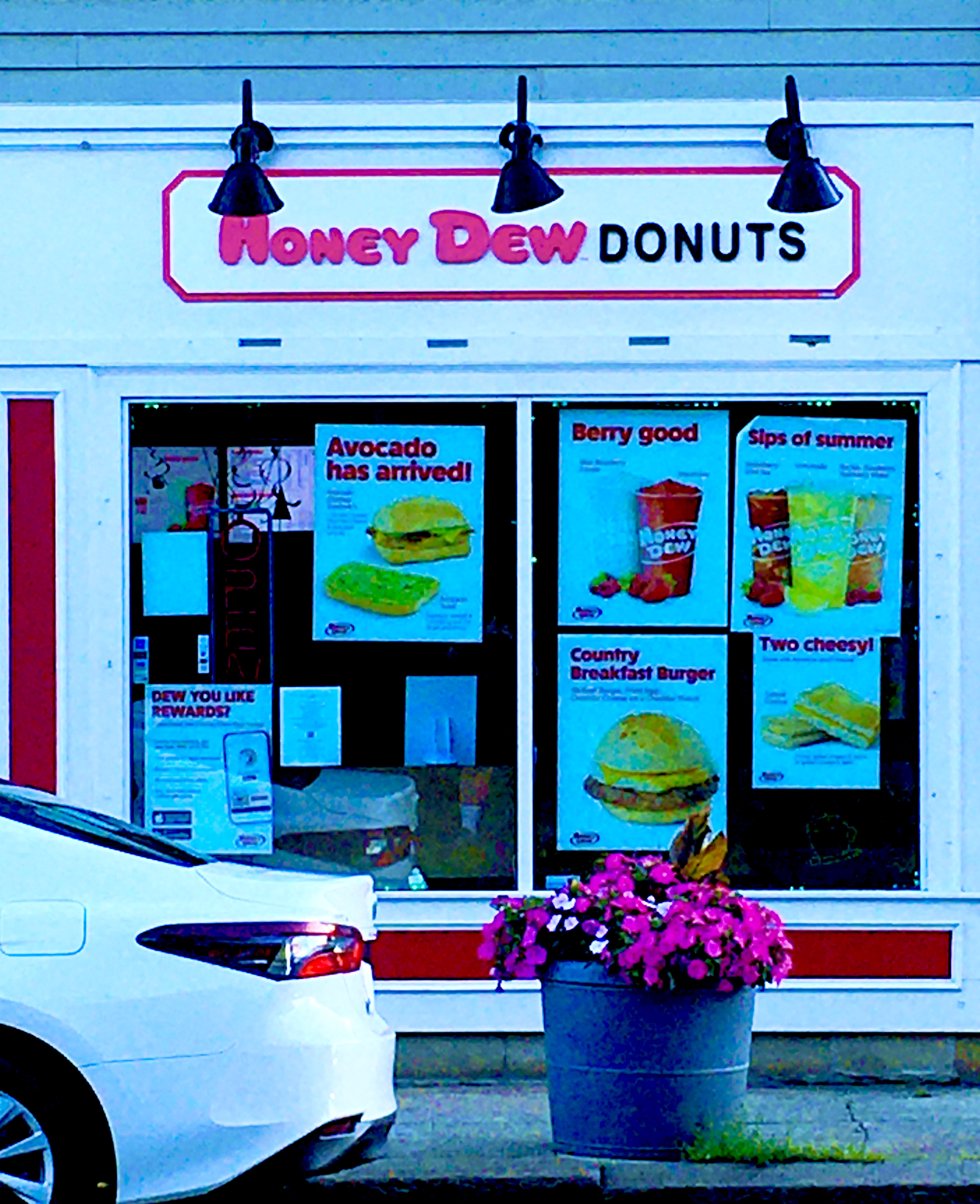
Exterior of a Honey Dew Donuts location on Main St. in the Greenwood section of Wakefield, Massachusetts, in June 2022

Honey Dew Donuts was founded in Mansfield, Massachusetts, by Richard J. "Dick" Bowen in 1973. In 1975, a customer suggested bringing a Honey Dew Donuts location to his community, who later became the first franchisee.

Dick Bowen was introduced to the aspect of donuts at the age of twelve by working with his father making donuts in a local donut shop in his community. He discovered his desire for a career in entrepreneurship while attending Stoughton High School, from which he graduated in 1965. After graduating from high school, Bowen enlisted in the army. He was relocated to Germany because of his deployment, where he worked as a donut baker and mechanic.

As of 2026, Honey Dew Donuts has 102 franchises in the New England states of Massachusetts, New Hampshire, and Rhode Island.

== Information ==
Honey Dew Donuts sells donuts, pastries, muffins and a variety of coffees. Their motto is "Always Fresh, Always Good!". The original Honey Dew Donuts location is in Mansfield, Massachusetts. The original Plainville, Massachusetts location was one of the first establishments in New England that constructed and utilized a drive-thru. In 2003, the franchise had 140 shops, 65 franchise families, and over 20 corporate employees. In 2012, Olivia Culpo, a Miss Rhode Island and Miss Universe winner, was featured in a Honey Dew Donuts commercial.

== See also ==
- Boston cream donut
- List of doughnut shops
