= World's Best Donuts =

- Interactive map of World's Best Donuts

Restaurant information
- Established: 1969; 57 years ago
- Location: Grand Marais, Cook County, Minnesota
- Coordinates: 47°44′57.08″N 90°19′58.23″W
- Website: Official website

World's Best Donuts is a doughnut shop and American restaurant in Grand Marais, Minnesota. It is located along the waterfront of Lake Superior. World's Best Donuts is an independent family-owned business established in 1969 by Merieta Altrichter. The shop has been featured in Minnesota Monthly and The New York Times, both of which described the shop's donuts as living up to the business's name.

== Awards and mentions ==
In 1997, The New York Times mentioned World's Best Donuts, saying, "This really is The World's Best Donut."

In 2007, Minnesota Monthly mentioned World's Best Donuts, saying, "The Grand Marais Donut Shop changed its name after customers kept telling them they had the 'best doughnuts in the world.' They're probably right."

In 2012, NPR mentioned World's Best Donuts in an article detailing some of best places in the country to get donuts in the summer.

In 2012, World's Best Donuts was awarded the Trip Advisor Certificate of Excellence as an outstanding hospitality business.<

World's Best Donuts has also been featured in numerous national travel guide books including National Geographic's The 100 Best Affordable Vacations, Lonely Planet's USA's Best Trips, and Roadfood: The Coast-to-Coast Guide to the Best Barbeque Joints, Lobster Shacks, Ice Cream Parlors, Highway Diners, and Much, Much More.

== See also ==
- List of doughnut shops
