= Big Apple Donuts and Coffee =

Restaurant Company in Malaysia

Big Apple Donuts & Coffee
- Company type: Private Limited Company
- Industry: Food and Beverage
- Founded: 2 May 2007; 19 years ago in Selangor, Malaysia
- Founder: Mike Chan
- Headquarters: Selangor, Malaysia
- Area served: Malaysia; Cambodia
- Products: Doughnuts • Coffee • Tea • Soft drinks
- Revenue: N/A
- Parent: Big Apple Interasia Sdn Bhd
- Website: www.bigappledonuts.com

Big Apple Worldwide Holdings Sdn Bhd (doing business as Big Apple Donuts & Coffee) is a café retailer in Malaysia specializing in donuts and coffee. The company is a subsidiary of Duskin Co. Ltd, and is owned and managed by Big Apple Inter-Asia. Big Apple Donuts & Coffee opened its first outlet and began trading in 2007. Their first outlet opened at The Curve in Mutiara Damansara, Selangor, Malaysia.

== Locations ==
Big Apple has locations in Malaysia across all states and federal territories (except Penang, Perlis and Labuan) and throughout Phnom Penh in Cambodia.

== See also ==
- List of doughnut shops
- List of coffeehouse chains
