= Go Nuts Donuts =

Doughnut restaurant chain in the Philippines

GoNuts
- Type: Private
- Industry: Doughnut shops
- Founded: December 11, 2003; 22 years ago
- Defunct: April 2020; 6 years ago
- Headquarters: Manila, Philippines
- Area served: Philippines
- Key people: Michael Trillana (President)
- Products: Doughnuts; Coffee; GoGos; GoNiNis

Go Nuts Donuts was a doughnut-shop chain based in the Philippines.

== History ==
Go Nuts Donuts was founded by the De Ocampo and Trillana families in 2003. As of 2009, the chain sold an average of 20,000 doughnuts per day, selling as many as 27,000 in one day. To promote their doughnuts outside of the Philippines, they started delivering through DHL or FedEx.

== See also ==
- List of doughnut shops
- Go Nuts Donuts Game - In Go Nuts for Donuts, players lay out donuts from the deck equal to the number of players plus one
