= SuzyQ Doughnuts =

Donut shop chain in Ottawa, Ontario, Canada

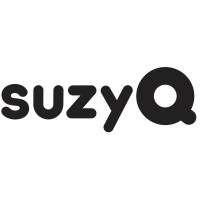

Restaurant information
- Established: March 1, 2012
- Owner: Susan Hamer
- Food type: Doughnuts
- Location: 1015 Wellington St. West, Ottawa, Ontario, Canada
- Other locations: 2
- Website: suzyq.ca

SuzyQ Doughnuts is a small chain of doughnut shops located in Ottawa, Ontario.

== History ==
The original location of the doughnut shop was opened in Ottawa's Hintonburg neighbourhood by Canada Post mailwoman Susan Hamer in spring 2012. In the years prior to opening the shop, Hamer made doughnuts in her home kitchen and sold them at the Lansdowne Park Farmer's Market and other craft fairs in the area.

The initial Hintonburg location was a small, repurposed three-room wooden shack off a parking lot on Wellington Street West. With no dining area and offering takeout service only, the bakery drew long lines each morning, with demand far outpacing the amount of doughnuts which could be produced.

Hamer described her doughnuts as "something egalitarian" that "didn’t seem too exclusive or appeal to [just one] crowd." SuzyQ's signature doughnut, the Sugar Munkki, was inspired by a recipe for twisted sugar and cardamom-spiced pastries (called munkii) from Hamer's Finnish-Canadian mother. The munkii base is also used for other doughnuts produced by the shop, such as Maple Bacon and Blueberry Vanilla Fruit Loop.

The shop sources all of its ingredients locally, buying from nearby farms and suppliers.

=== Expansion ===
Starting in 2014, the shop began to offer delivery for a minimum order of two dozen doughnuts.

In 2016, SuzyQ expanded to increase its doughnut production and sales capacity. That January, the original Hintonburg shop relocated from its shack to a larger space down the street. With a larger location that also had dine-in seating, Hamer also began to serve coffee, ice cream, brunch and other items in addition to the staple doughnuts.

As of 2025, the business operates three locations in the Ottawa-area - its original shop in Hintonburg, a location in south Ottawa on St. Laurent Boulevard, and a location in Ottawa's west-end neighbourhood of Bells Corners.

== Recognition ==
Peter Hum, restaurant critic for the Ottawa Citizen, praised SuzyQ Doughnuts for its wide appeal across all demographics, highlighting the signature Sugar Munkki and other standout flavors like Dirty Chocolate and Raspberry Cassis. He noted the shop’s resilience through challenges, including the pandemic, and its commitment to sourcing local ingredients despite rising costs.

Former Mayor of Ottawa Jim Watson was noted as a regular customer of the business.
