= Krispy Kreme operations by country =

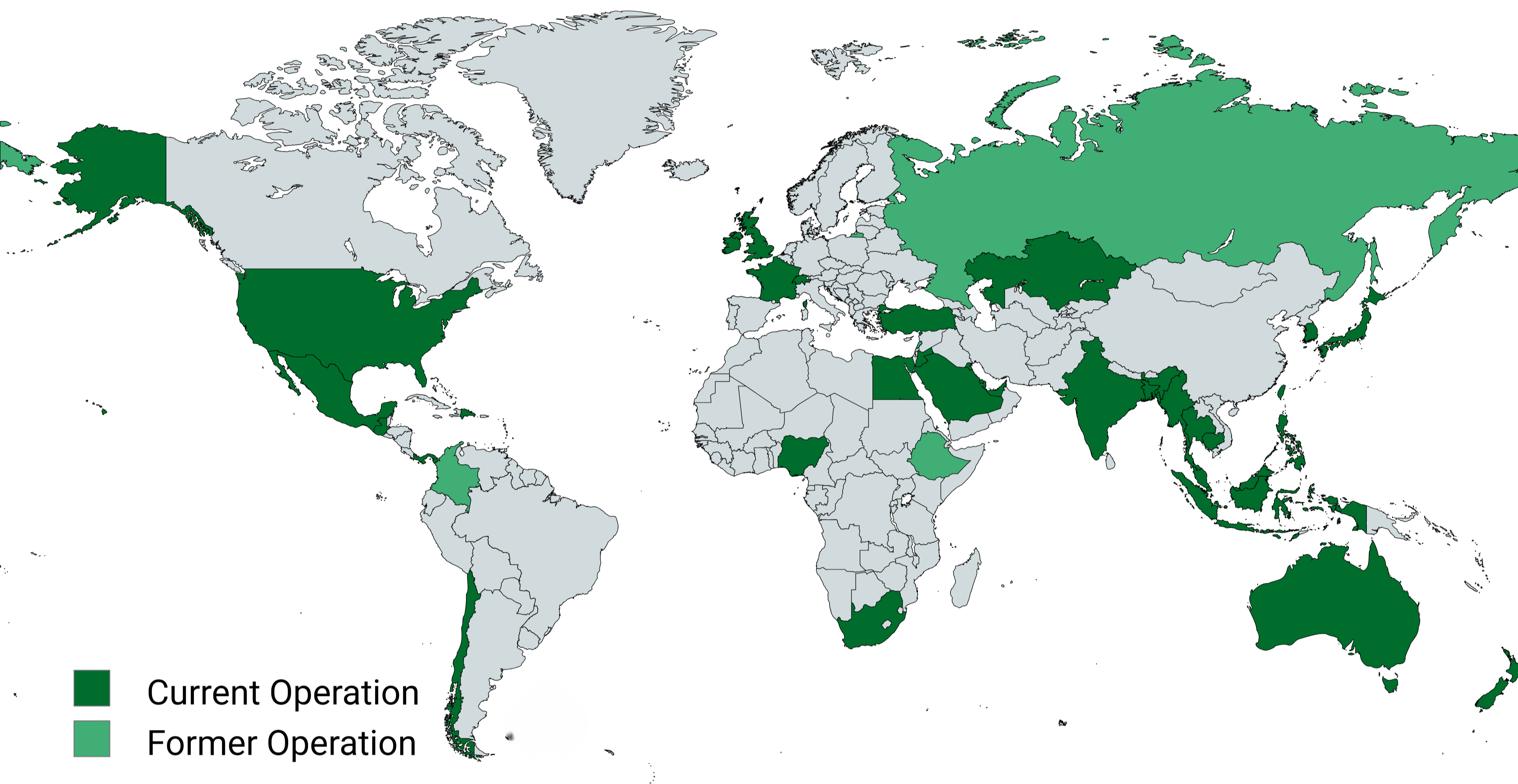
Krispy Kreme's current operation countries list: 35 countries

Krispy Kreme is an American multinational coffeehouse chain that specializes in doughnuts. As of 2024 it operates in 36 countries worldwide.

== Australia ==
The first international franchise was opened in Australia during 2003. Initially sales were high and the business expanded rapidly to more than 40 stores by 2010.

On 29 October 2010, the Australian division went into voluntary administration, with media reports attributing this to falling sales, pricey rents, and high distribution costs. As a result of this administration, several stores closed in early November 2010. The retail stores and the manufacturing facilities in South Australia were sold to the Peregrine Group.

In December 2010, the business came out of administration and continued trading with fewer stores in New South Wales, Queensland and Victoria. The chain began expanding again with a new store opening in Western Australia in 2014.

The Australian chain has a fundraising program which aims to assist schools, workplaces, charities and non-profit organisations.

Krispy Kreme announced a strategic partnership with 7-Eleven in December 2011, and their products are currently sold in 7-Eleven stores within Australia. Krispy Kreme Doughnuts can also be purchased at select BP stores around Tasmania and at selected Woolworths locations.

In January 2018 Krispy Kreme Australia created and began selling Kreme Shakes including the Original Glazed shake containing a blended Original Glaze doughnut.

=== Australian Capital Territory ===
There are no plans for any stores in the ACT.

=== New South Wales ===
The first Krispy Kreme store outside of North America was opened in Australia on 19 June 2003 at Penrith. Before opening they gave away 300,000 free doughnuts for publicity. There are currently 18 Krispy Kreme stores in New South Wales.

=== Northern Territory ===
A store in Yarrawonga was announced in 2021, but there have been no further updates since 2023.

=== Queensland ===
Krispy Kreme has eight stores in Queensland. The first store to open was situated in the Myer Centre, Brisbane, which has now relocated to Albert Street. A second store operates at Brisbane Airport.

All stores in Queensland are supplied by daily deliveries of doughnuts cooked at the commissary facility in Logan, south of Brisbane.

=== Victoria ===
The first store in Victoria opened on 22 June 2006 in the suburb of Narre Warren at Fountain Gate Shopping Centre, and featured a 24-hour drive-through service. The store is hugely popular amongst Melburnians, some of whom queued for several hours during the store's first few weeks. The drive-through queue during this period was often over 500 metres long.

=== Western Australia ===
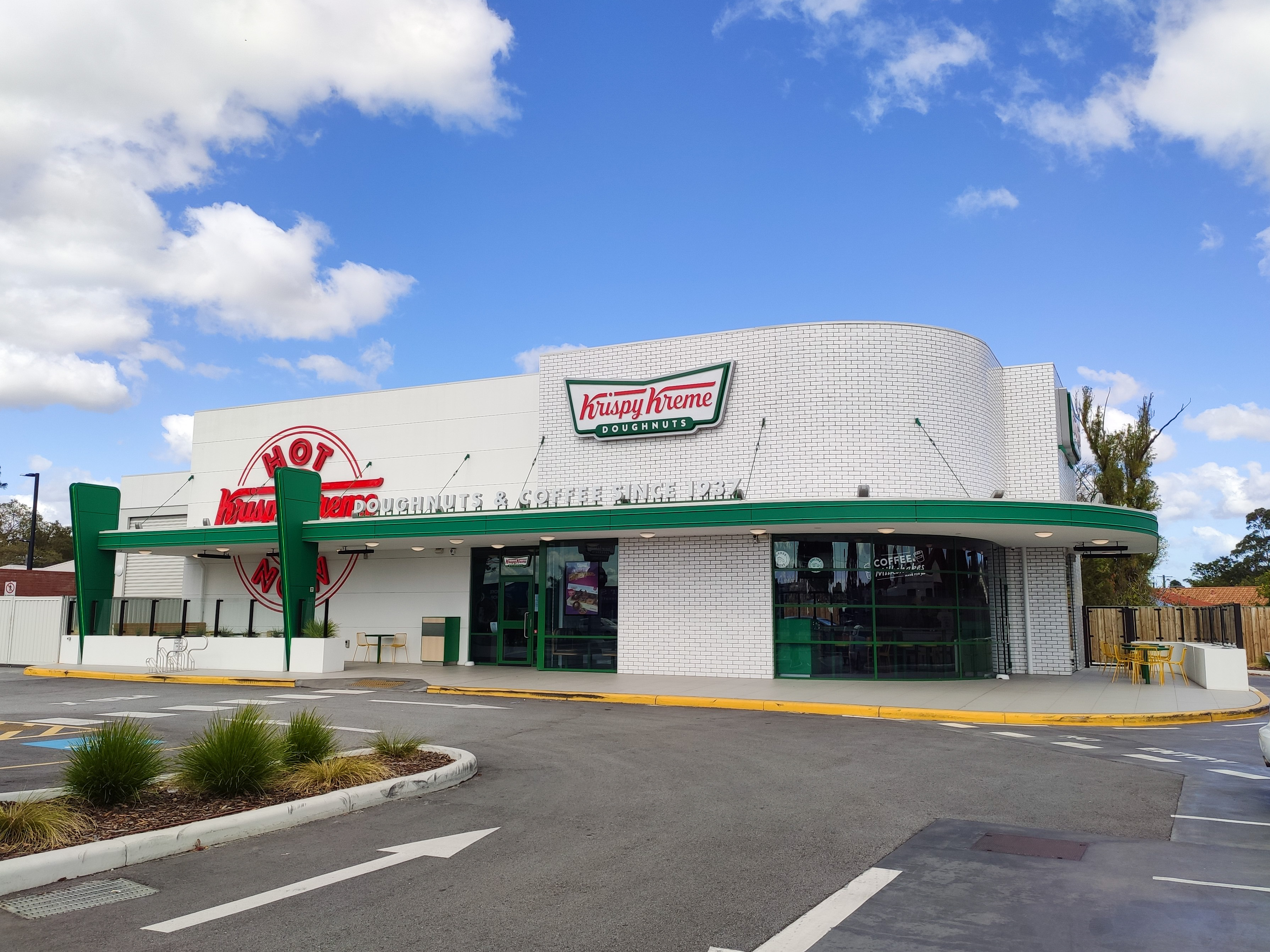
Krispy Kreme in Cannington, Western Australia

Krispy Kreme opened its first Perth store in Whitford City, Hillarys on 26 November 2014. The opening day broke the world record in Krispy Kreme purchases on the first day of trading with over 73,200 doughnuts sold and was the most successful opening day in Krispy Kreme's 77-year history.

Krispy Kreme opened a second store in Myaree on 3 July 2015. Krispy Kreme also has two other stores in Perth. One in the CBD on Hay Street and the other in Cannington. Doughnuts are also sold at 7-Eleven, Woolworths and Jester's Pies.

=== South Australia ===
Krispy Kreme opened its first store in South Australia in West Croydon on 15 July 2014. Other stores locations include Gouger Street and James Place in the central business district where doughnuts are delivered daily from the West Croydon store, they are also sold at BP outlets across South Australia. Stores in South Australia are run independently by the Peregrine Corporation.

=== Tasmania ===
Krispy Kreme can be purchased at select BP stores around Tasmania.

== Bahrain ==
Krispy Kreme opened at Bahrain in Seef Mall on 1 October 2008 and had over 300 customers on its first day. It has also opened at City Center and in Al-Jawad, Juffair.

== Brazil ==
On 29 April 2025, Krispy Kreme opened its first store in São Paulo, Brazil. There is currently 6 location as of August 2026.

== Cambodia ==
On 22 May 2016, Krispy Kreme opened its first store in Phnom Penh, Cambodia. There are currently 10 locations as of 2022.

== Canada ==
The first outlet opened on 11 December 2001 in Mississauga, Ontario with 18 stores opened out of 32 originally planned. This has now been reduced to eleven (six in the Toronto area, four in Quebec and one in Delta, British Columbia) as of February 2020. In July 2016, Krispy Kreme had plans to open 50 stores in Ontario and Quebec and the spread to the rest of the country. Many of the doughnuts can also be found at locations such as Petro-Canada and Loblaws. The Canadian operations are managed under the franchisee Krispy K Canada of Toronto, Ontario with the Delta location under separate management. On May 13, 2025 Krispy Kreme opened another doughnut store in Hamilton, Ontario.

== Colombia ==
On 25 September 2013, Krispy Kreme announced their expansion into Colombia, the first South American country for the company. Krispy Kreme is set to open 25 stores in Colombia's major cities including Bogotá, Medellín, and Barranquilla in less than 5 years and jointly manage the planned stores with Bogotá-based IRCC Ltda., a subsidiary of the VA! Group.

== Dominican Republic ==
Krispy Kreme opened its first store in Dominican territory at the Winston Churchill Avenue in Santo Domingo in July 2010. It has been a popular place among Dominicans. Krispy Kreme Doughnut Corporation first franchisee store, with Dominspec, S.A. opened its first Krispy Kreme doughnut shop in the Dominican Republic on 24 August 2010. The first of a programmed 14 stores on the first phase of future expansion in the whole country. So far to date the franchise has opened 3 stores in the Santo Domingo area with another one slate to open later in 2012 in Santiago city.

== Egypt ==
Krispy Kreme opened its first store in Cairo, Egypt on 19 August 2021.

== Estonia ==
In June 2026, Krispy Kreme announced plans to open its first location in Estonia, which is expected to open in Tallinn in late 2026.

== France ==
Krispy Kreme opened its first store in Paris in December 2023.

== Germany ==
Members of the United States Armed Forces stationed in Germany have been able to enjoy Krispy Kreme products for some time, as these are sold in select Commissaries. However, as access to these military bases is generally restricted to individuals with Department of War (DoW) identification, Krispy Kreme donuts have been exclusively available to U.S. personnel.

Krispy Kreme previously experimented with entering the German market in 2017 by opening a temporary pop-up store in Frankfurt. This venture was short-lived, and the store has since closed.

In May 2024, Krispy Kreme announced plans for a formal expansion into the German market. This move represents the company's largest franchise agreement to date. Krispy Kreme partnered with the ISH Group, a Turkish company that previously served as the master franchisee for Yum! Brands' KFC and Pizza Hut operations in Germany.

== Hong Kong ==
Krispy Kreme Hong Kong opened their first store in Causeway Bay in September 2006. After that date they also opened another store located in Soho. Both stores sold special doughnuts produced to celebrate Halloween. These stores were franchise owned.

During the years of operation, Krispy Kreme also delivered donuts around Hong Kong. Because of this many schools in Hong Kong did charity Krispy Kreme Sales.

A third Krispy Kreme store opened in December in Causeway Bay at Times Square. A fourth store opened in Mong Kok, the first outlet that was not on Hong Kong Island. Another branch opened in Discovery Bay. Krispy Kreme also opened two stores at the Hong Kong International Airport, one in the Arrivals hall of Terminal 1 and the other one in Terminal 2 (Sky Plaza).

== India ==
Krispy Kreme, through franchisee Citymax Hotels India Ltd., opened its first store on 19 January 2013 in Bangalore, Karnataka. They opened another store, also in Bangalore, in The Forum Mall

== Indonesia ==
As of 2023, Krispy Kreme has 35 stores in Indonesia.

== Ireland ==
Since 26 September 2018, there had been only one store in Blanchardstown, a suburb of Dublin. On 23 February 2023, Krispy Kreme announced they would be opening 2 new stores in Galway and Cork.

As of January 2024, there are now multiple stores in Dublin, Cork, Galway and Limerick.

== Japan ==
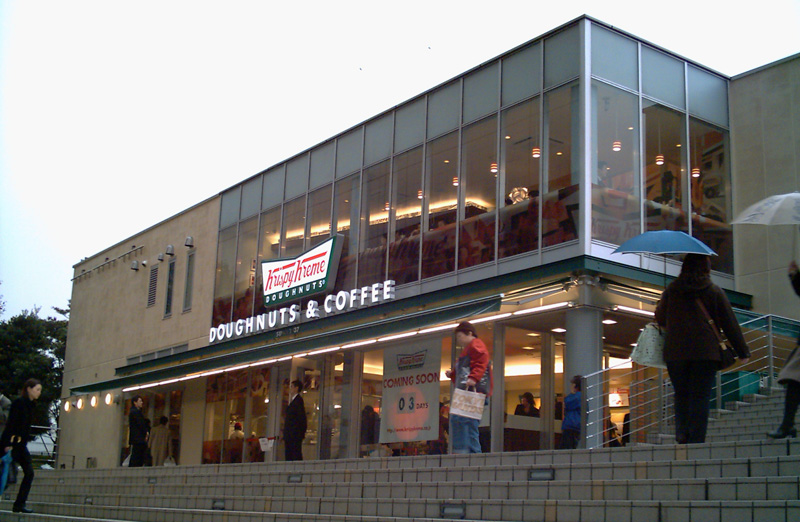
Krispy Kreme Doughnuts Shinjuku, Tokyo

Krispy Kreme Doughnuts Japan operates 45 shops throughout the country as of September 2016. Krispy Kreme opened their first store in Japan at Shinjuku Southern Terrace in Shibuya-ku, Tokyo on Friday 15 December 2006. The original glaze sells for 160 Japanese yen. Plans are in place to build around 50 stores in the Kantō region (which will all be franchise owned) in the next five years.

Since opening, the store has seen hour long waits to get in, and in the first three days the store saw more than 10,000 customers.

In the event of a long wait, this location is known for providing a free hot glazed donut to patrons waiting in the queue.

The second store in Japan opened 12 October 2007 with the Yurakucho ITOCiA complex in the Yūrakuchō district in Tokyo. The Krispy Kreme store is located on the first basement level and is expected to be a major draw for the new shopping center which is built on top of the Yurakucho station.

== Kuwait ==
The first Krispy Kreme in the Middle East opened in Kuwait's Marina World shopping complex in late November 2006. A second and larger branch opened at The Avenues shopping mall in early 2007.

== Kazakhstan ==
The first Krispy Kreme in Kazakhstan opened in Atakent, Almaty on 3 October 2023.

As of November 2023, there are 2 stores.

== Lebanon ==
Krispy Kreme announced they would be closing all their branches in Lebanon on 19 October 2014.

== Malaysia ==
Krispy Kreme in Malaysia is operated by Berjaya Foods, owned by the Berjaya Group. The first outlet opened in April 2009. As of 2025, there are 30 stores.

== Mexico ==
Krispy Kreme may have found success in their twenty-eight outlets in Mexico. Similar to their U.S. counterparts, some Mexican Krispy Kreme locations can be found inside Walmart stores.

== Myanmar ==
Myanmar opened its first Krispy Kreme in 2018, located in the Times Link Mall.

== New Zealand ==
The first Krispy Kreme store and manufacturing facility in New Zealand opened in the Auckland suburb of Manukau in February 2018.

== Nigeria ==
Krispy Kreme officially launched in Nigeria on March 10 2018, opening its first shop at Ikeja City Mall In Lagos to massive crowds. After the successful launch, the chain expanded to 20 locations in Nigeria—including 14 outlets in Lagos (found in Victoria Island, Lekki, Yaba, Surulere, and the Murtala Muhammed airports) and 6 outlets in Abuja (spanning Wuse, Gwarinpa, Apo, Lugbe, and the Abuja airport). Through this strategic network of shopping malls, airports, and commercial districts listed on the Krispy Kreme Nigeria Store Directory, the brand has made its way to Nigeria's store and hospitality sector.

== Philippines ==
On 30 November 2006, Krispy Kreme opened its flagship Philippine store at Bonifacio High Street in Bonifacio Global City, Taguig. These stores are franchise owned like many others. As of 2022, there are 102 Krispy Kreme branches in the Philippines, all franchise-owned like many others. The development deal for the franchise is awarded to the Real American Donut Company, Inc., a subsidiary of Max's Group. The original franchise agreement is for 30 stores over the next five years.

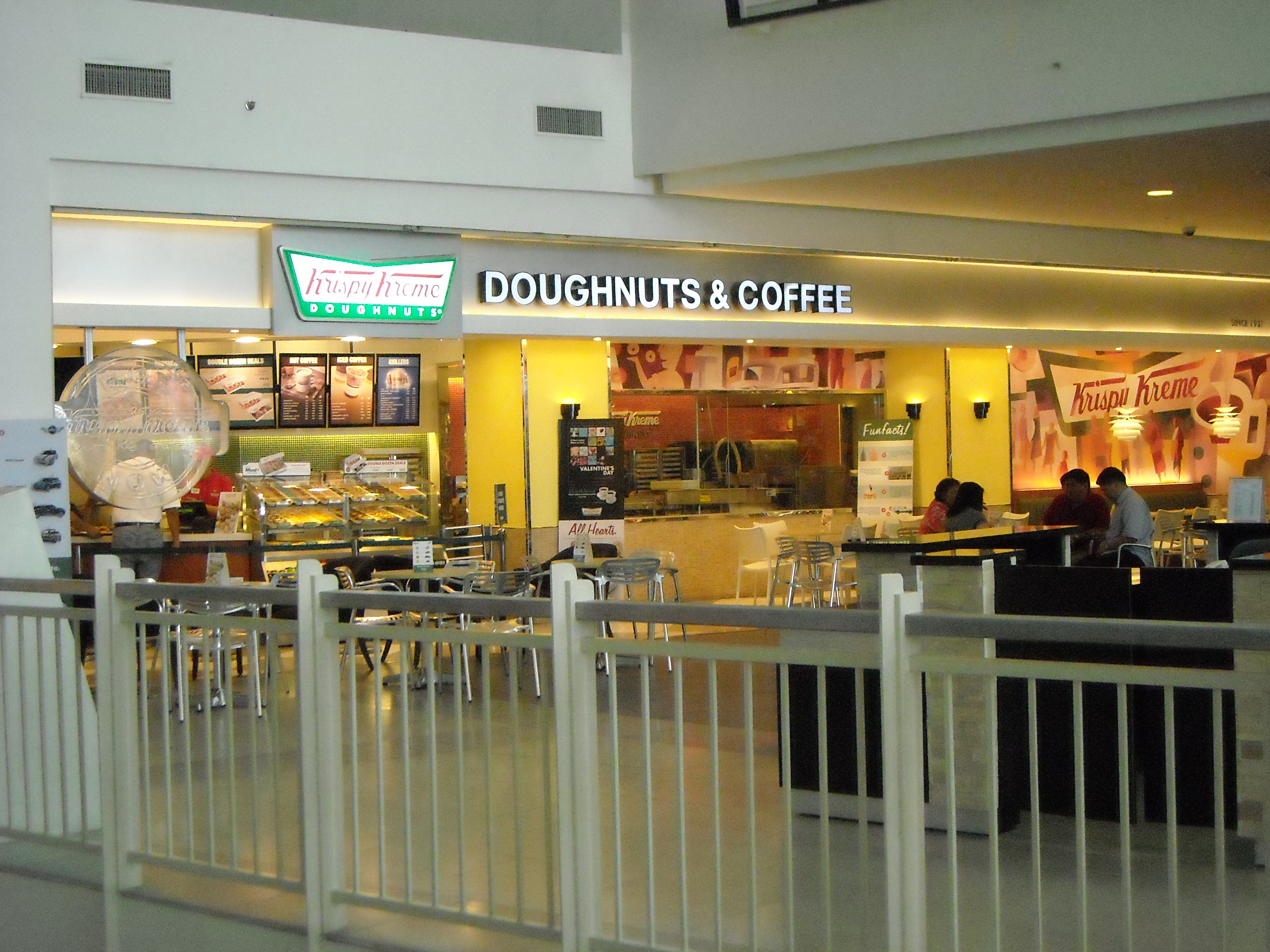
Marquee Mall, Angeles City

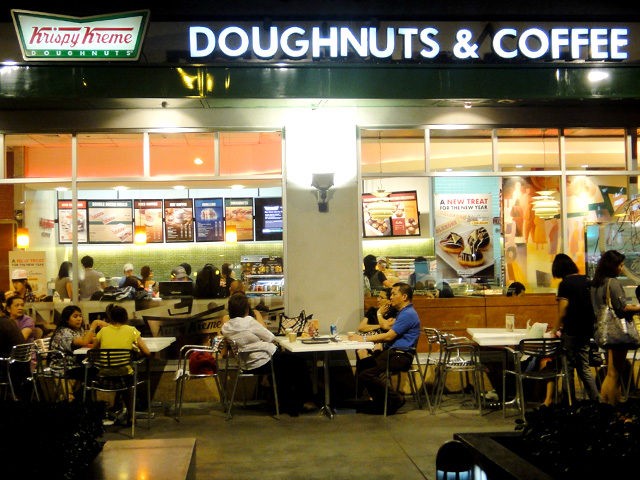
Bonifacio Global City, Taguig

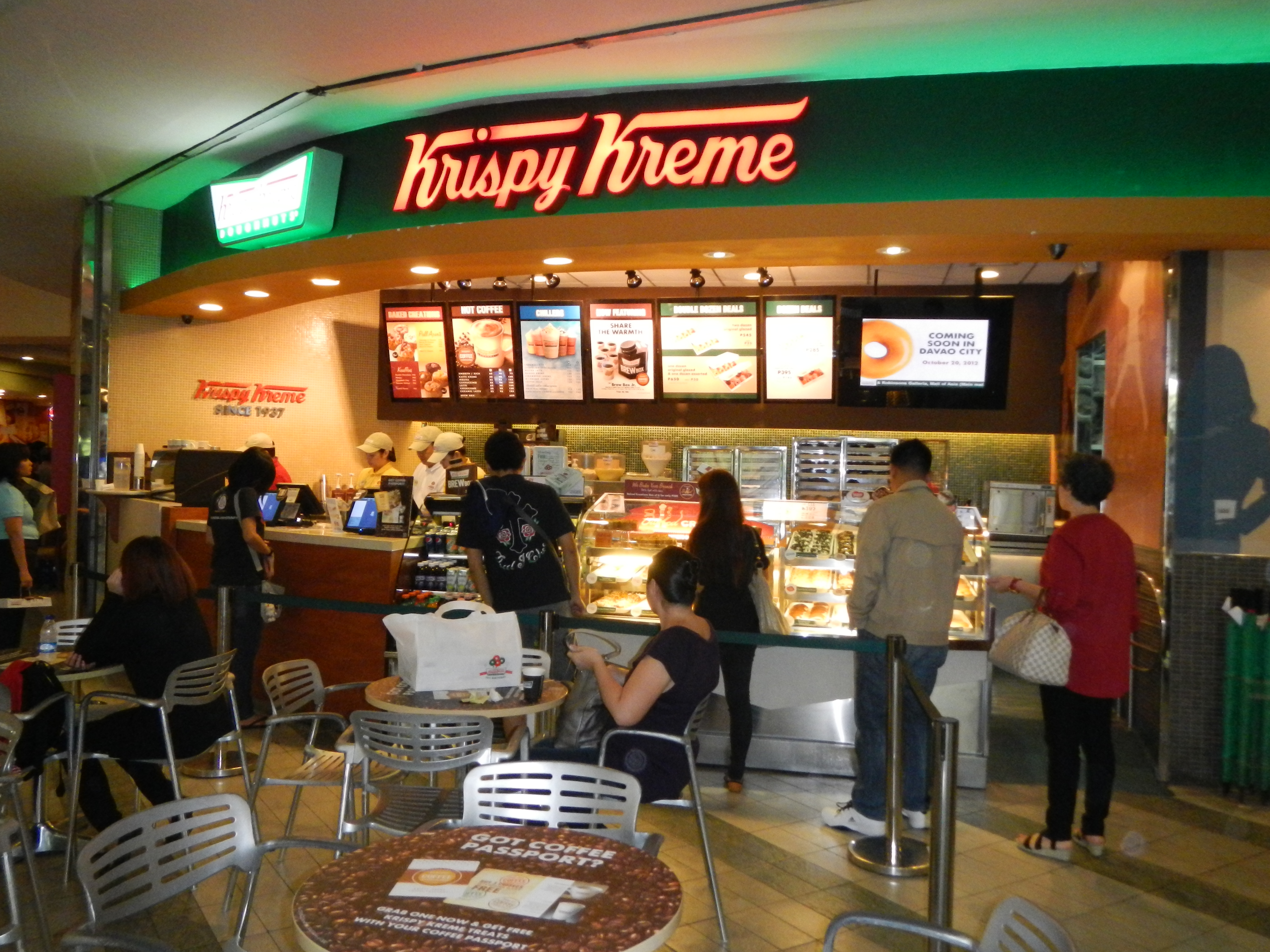
TriNoma, Quezon City

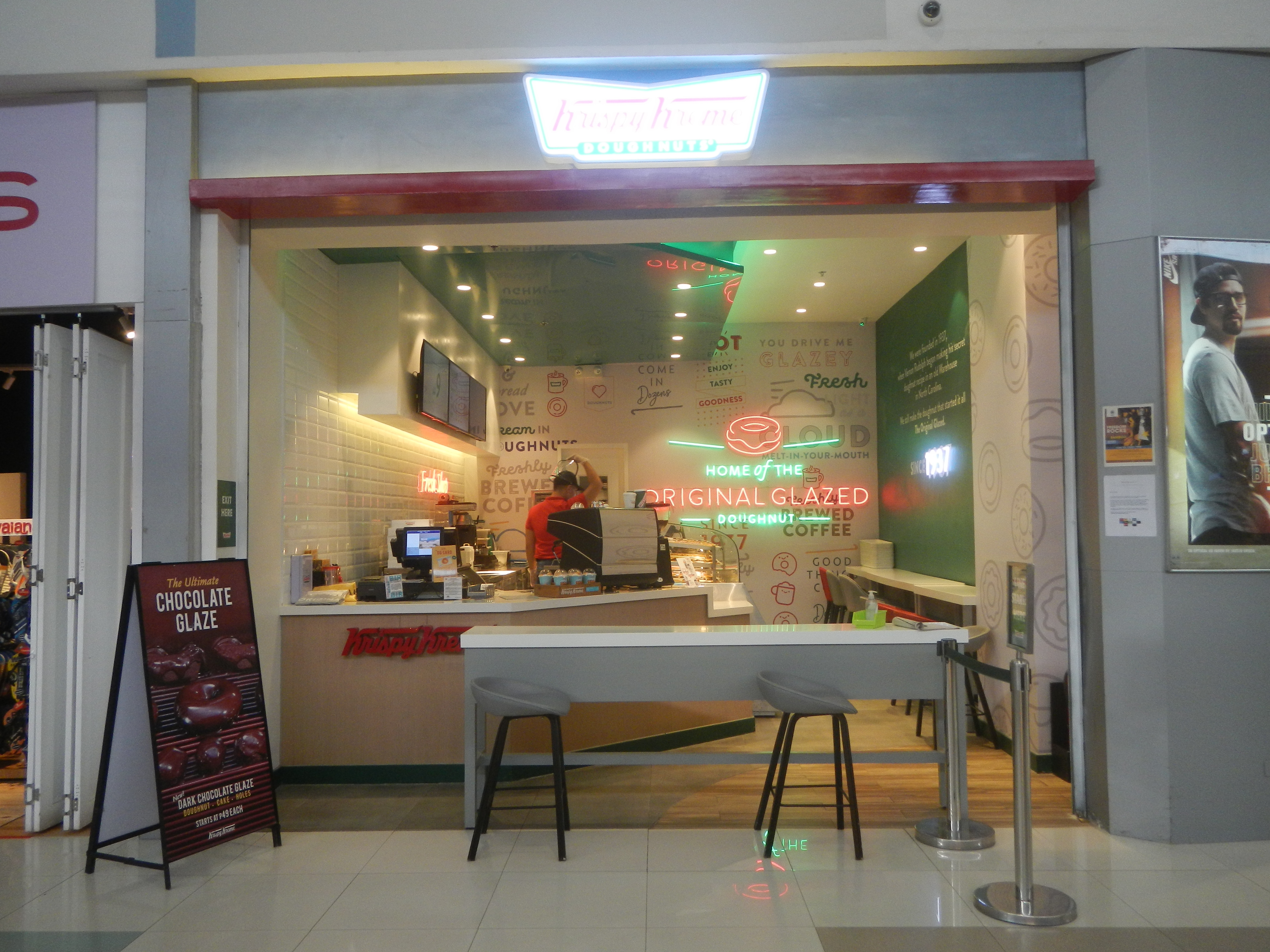
SM City Baliwag, Baliuag, Bulacan

== Russia ==
On September 12, 2013, the first Krispy Kreme coffee shop in Russia opened on Nikolskaya Street.

Due to 2022 Russian invasion of Ukraine, the company left the Russian market. The restaurants changed their sign and are now called Krunchy Dream.

== Singapore ==
Krispy Kreme began operations in Singapore on 12 October 2013 with their flagship store located at Tangs Orchard Basement 1.

It was brought into Singapore by Southeast Asian retailer and franchise partner Andy Chaw, owner and operator of Star360 Group. The Tangs Orchard store is the first of 15 stores expected to open in Singapore under the Star360 Group.

At present, Krispy Kreme has 2 outlets in Singapore.

== South Africa ==
In May 2015 it was announced that 31 Krispy Kreme stores will be opened in South Africa within the next 5 years. The decision marks the company's first venture into the African market. In November 2015 the first store opened in Rosebank, Johannesburg. This is the 800th store opened by Krispy Kreme and the first in Africa.

== South Korea ==
Krispy Kreme entered their first Asian market in South Korea on 16 December 2004 at Sinchon-dong of Seoul. By their first year in 2005, Krispy Kreme was able to expand with four more stores, and their location number boosted afterwards, with Jeonju getting their 100th milestone store in Korea, and the 300th Store in Asia on 16 December 2014- exactly ten years after their first opening.

As of September 2016, 129 different stores services across the country, more than any other Asia-Pacific nations. Most of the stores are gathered within the northwestern Seoul/Gyeonggi regions (58 stores), and the southeastern Busan/Gyeongnam regions (21 stores). 25 of the stores across the country also exhibits the manufacturing of the donuts, dubbed the 'Donut Theatre' (도넛극장).

Krispy Kreme Donuts is partnered with Lotte Company in Korea since 2010.

== Switzerland ==
The first Location in Switzerland was opened in Lausanne, VD in 2023.

== Taiwan ==
Krispy Kreme opened its first Taiwan store at the Xinyi Vieshow Cinemas Complex in Xinyi District, Taipei on 12 December 2013. There are currently five stores in Taiwan, all of them located in Taipei. These can be found at- Xinyi Vieshow, Nanjing Road, Miramar Shopping Mall, Banqiao train station and Taipei main station.

== Thailand ==
Krispy Kreme opened a store at Siam Paragon in September 2010 and another store at Central Ladprao in August 2011 in Bangkok, Thailand. The most popular Krispy Kreme location in Thailand is in the Siam Paragon mall, Ratchaprasong, Pathumwan, Bangkok. At present, Krispy Kreme has 33 stores in Thailand.

== Turkey ==
Almana Yiyecek Ve Icecek San. Ve. Tic Ltd STI, a subsidiary of Qatar-based Almana Group became Krispy Kreme's master franchisee in Turkey 2008 and opened the first store in Istanbul in 2009. There currently are 24 active stores in Turkey.

== United Arab Emirates ==
Krispy Kreme commenced its United Arab Emirates operations in on 16 March 2007 at the food court in Deira City Centre in Dubai. Krispy Kreme has also opened stores in the Mall of the Emirates and Dubai Festival City, both in Dubai. The franchises are owned by the Americana Group. In late 2007 a new branch opened at Khalidiyah Mall in Abu Dhabi. Krispy Kreme also opened in Al Buhaira (Kornich Khalid) and Sharjah Industrial Area next to Al Darary Area in Sharjah. The most recent store opened in Ajman Corniche.

== United Kingdom ==
In October 2003 Krispy Kreme UK opened their first store at the Harrods department store in London, which closed in June 2011. Krispy Kreme currently separate their stores into three categories: Factory Stores that produce all fifteen doughnuts varieties, Hot Tunnels that have the equipment to add warm glaze to original glazed doughnuts that are produced elsewhere, and Fresh locations' that rely entirely on factory stores. The latter are also seen inside larger Tesco stores.

== United States ==
=== Alabama ===
The popular Tuscaloosa franchise, just off the campus of the University of Alabama, was decimated in the unprecedented 4/27/11 tornado system that tore a 1.5 miles (2.4 km) wide gash through the heart of the college town, and remaining on the ground for a full 80 miles, stopping as far away as Birmingham. The franchise reopened in August 2012 with much enthusiasm from the community as one of the earliest businesses to reopen in this devastated section of town. Huntsville and Montgomery, Alabama Also has one location, with the next closest location being in Florence, some 70 miles away.

=== Arizona ===
Krispy Kreme reentered the Arizona market when a new franchise reopened its East Mesa, Arizona, location on 13 May 2008. This location was purchased by Krispy Kreme after Rigel closed it in 2006. The new franchise owner, Dan Brinton, plans to eventually open four to five factory stores in the Phoenix market. These stores are planned to support 10 to 15 smaller non-factory stores that will only sell doughnuts and other products.

=== California ===
In January 2006, Krispy Kreme terminated the donut license of Great Circle Family Foods LLC, alleging non-payment of required fees. At the time, they were one of the largest franchisees, operating 28 stores in Southern California. Preceding this action was a financial dispute by Great Circle, culminating in their September lawsuit filed against Krispy Kreme. The lawsuit was settled in July 2006 and led to the reinstatement of Great Circle's license. On 22 August 2007, Great Circle Family Foods and some of its wholly owned subsidiaries filed for Chapter 11 Bankruptcy. Great Circle emerged from Chapter 11 on 6 July 2009, and currently operates 11 stores in Southern California.

=== New England ===
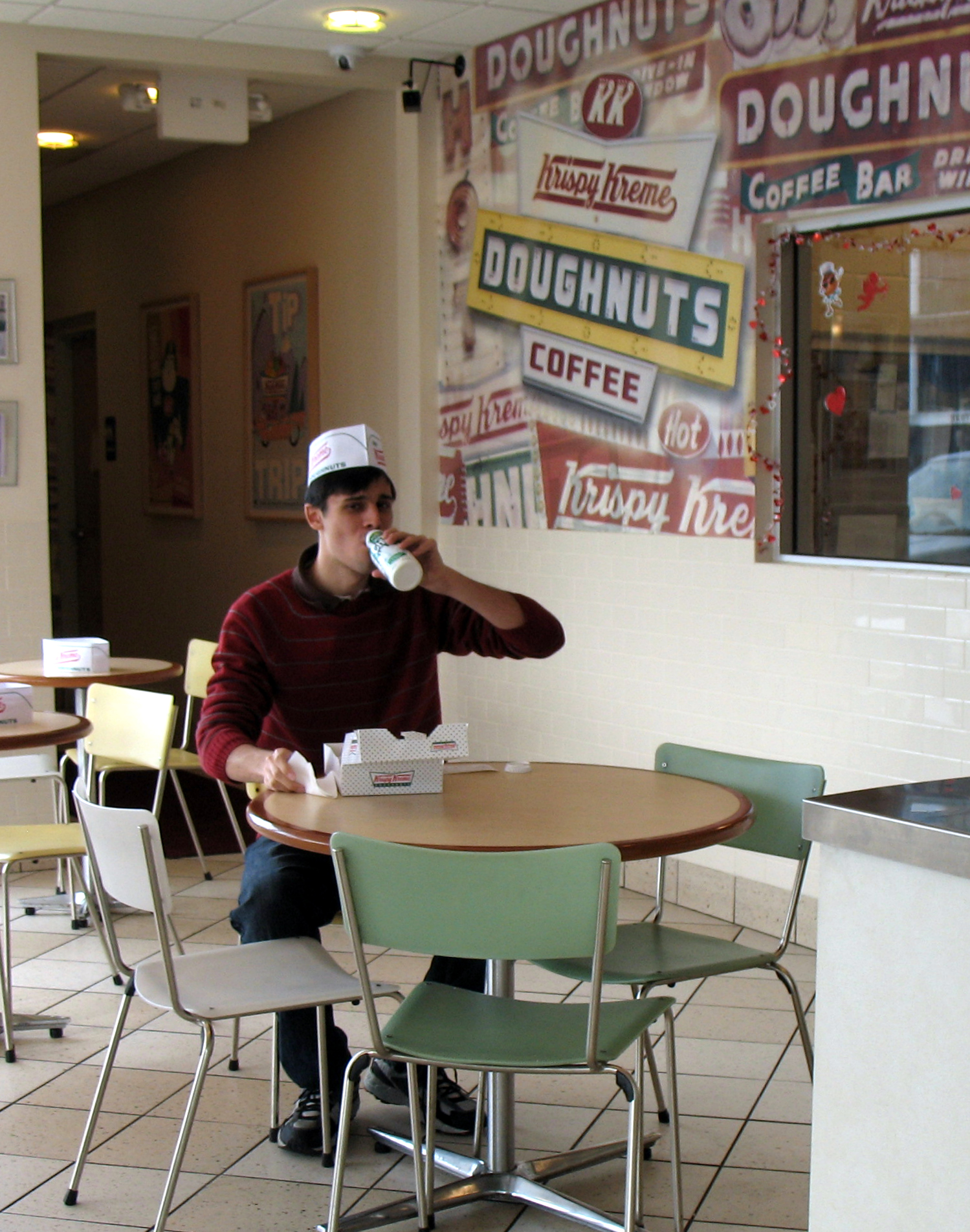
A Krispy Kreme customer wearing the signature garrison cap

In 2002, Krispy Kreme opened its second store in New England in Newington, Connecticut. What followed was a period of aggressive expansion throughout the region; this included a Krispy Kreme at the Prudential Center in Boston, Massachusetts, which opened on 15 April 2004 and closed sixteen months later. Initially fueled by hype surrounding the opening of Krispy Kreme in New England, this regional expansion was followed by the closing of all but one store, at the Mohegan Sun casino in Uncasville. In January 2010 the Milford store, the first to open in the region, closed after a long decline in patronage. Some say that Krispy Kreme's coffee "left many locals unimpressed, a mortal sin in the joe-loving Hub."

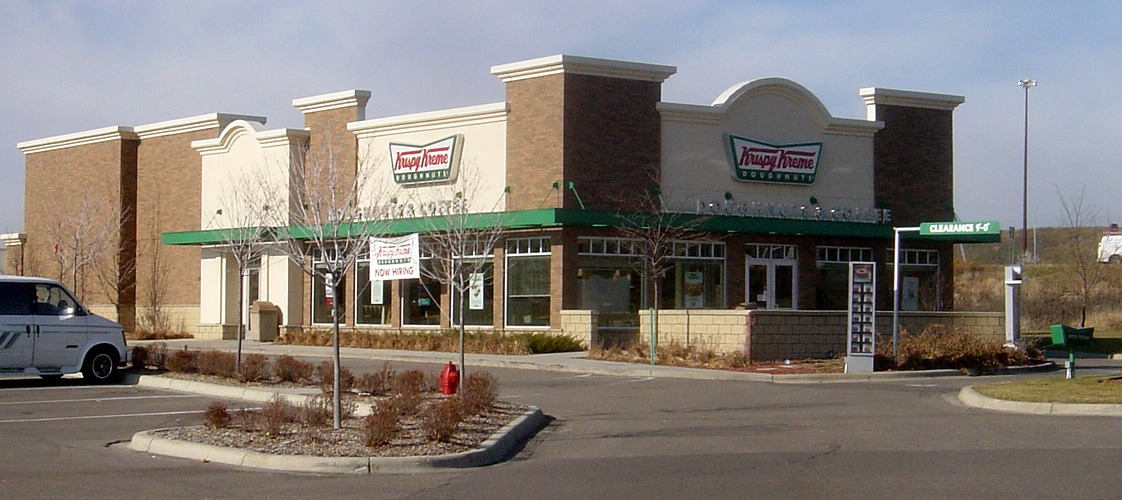
A location in Eden Prairie, Minnesota, closed as of 21 February 2008, along with all its Minnesota locations

Krispy Kreme also opened one store in Cranston, Rhode Island in May 2003. It closed in 2008 after receiving initial fanfare. This may be due to dominance of Dunkin' Donuts in the state.

=== Nevada ===
After opening to great hype in 2000, the franchise in Reno closed suddenly on 15 May 2008. Without warning, employees were greeted with a sign on the door that morning saying "we apologize for any inconvenience." Rising fuel costs were cited as the primary reason for the closure.

=== Puerto Rico ===
On 6 May 2008, the first store in Puerto Rico opened, followed by two additional locations in 2010 and one additional location in 2011.

=== Texas ===
In 2002, Krispy Kreme opened a restaurant-style store in the Amarillo area in Texas. Many thought that the local doughnut store was the reason the national chain closed, but this was not the case. The Amarillo Krispy Kreme closed on 17 July 2005. Krispy Kreme Round Rock closed in 2009. However, shop 251 in Grapevine (opened in 1998) remains open, as well as three shops in El Paso and two more in Austin. In April 2019, a new storefront was opened in College Station, and is the most recent addition to the state.
