= Duck Donuts =

American donut company

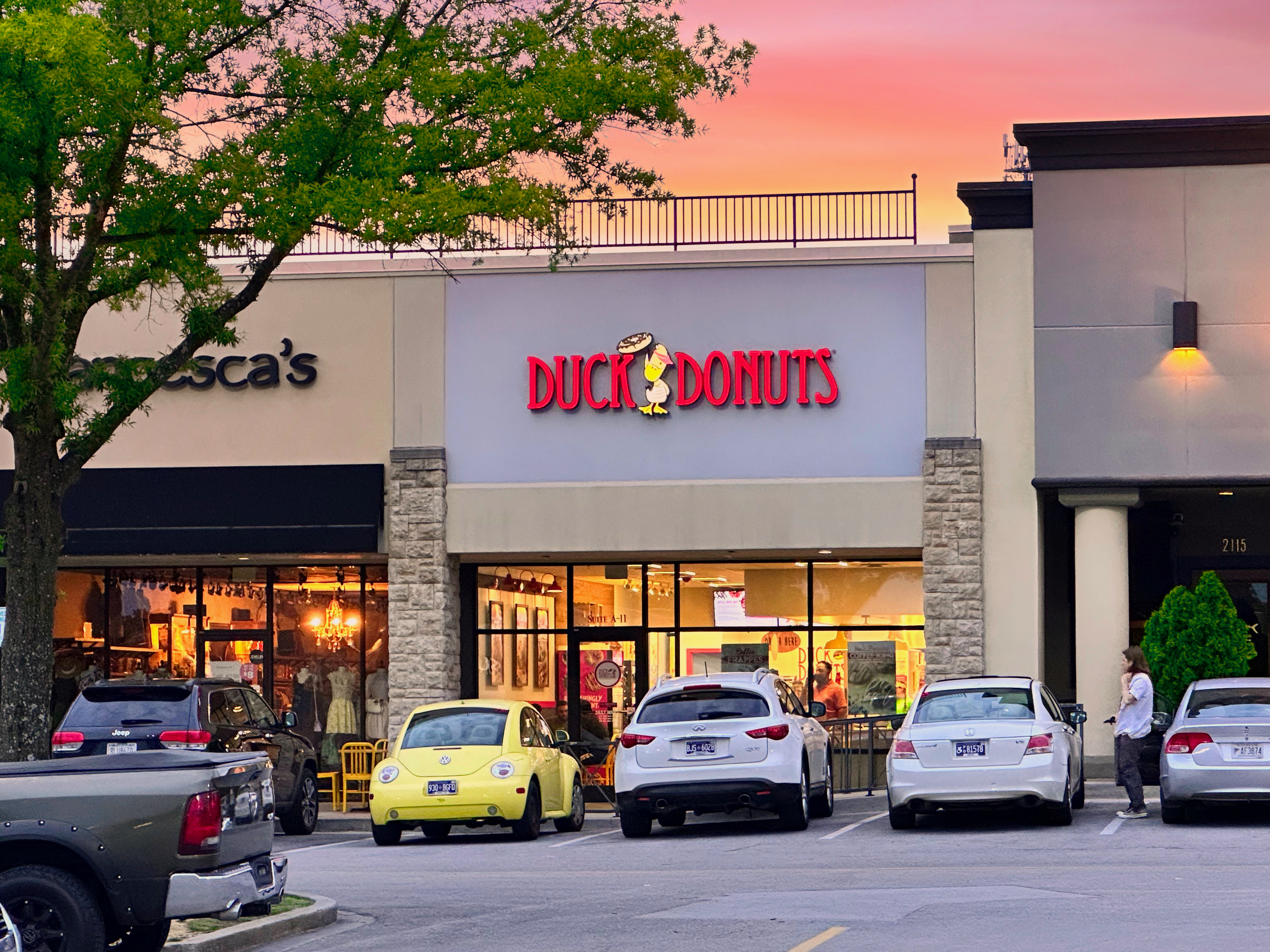
- Duck Donuts in Chattanooga, Tennessee
- Type: Private
- Industry: Foodservice; restaurant; franchising
- Genre: Café; coffeehouse; doughnut shop
- Founded: 2006; Duck, North Carolina, U.S.
- Founder: Russell DiGilio; Robin Griffith
- Headquarters: 6230 Carlisle Pike; Hampden Township, Pennsylvania, U.S.
- Number of locations: 127 shops (June 2026)
- Area served: Worldwide
- Key people: Betsy Hamm – CEO; Andy Kmiec – Vice President
- Products: Baked goods; Hot beverages; Iced beverages; Desserts; Sandwiches; Soft drinks
- Services: Franchising; Catering
- Revenue: US$35 million (2021)
- Website: DuckDonuts.com

Duck Donuts is an American doughnut shop chain based in Mechanicsburg, Pennsylvania. Duck Donuts was founded in 2006 in Duck, North Carolina, by Russ DiGilio and Robin Griffith, and has since expanded to over 120 locations in the United States (as of June 2026). The chain's products include customizable, made-to-order doughnuts, other baked goods, and a range of beverages.

== History and operations ==
Headquartered at 6230 Carlisle Pike in Hampden Township, near Mechanicsburg, Pennsylvania, Duck Donuts was founded in 2006 by Russell "Russ" DiGilio, who saw a need for "warm, fresh, made-to-order doughnuts", and Robin Griffith. Both natives of Delaware County, Pennsylvania, the duo met in 1992 while working in the assisted living industry.

Prior to Duck Donuts, there were no doughnut shops in North Carolina's Outer Banks. The first Duck Donuts shop was opened in Duck, North Carolina, from which the chain got its name, followed by a second location in Kitty Hawk. The third and fourth Duck Donut shops were opened in Kill Devil Hills and Corolla respectively.

For half a decade, Duck Donuts was limited to the Outer Banks, but after receiving numerous inquiries about franchising, DiGiglio finally decided to establish the Duck Donuts Franchising Company; the first franchise location was opened in Williamsburg, Virginia, in 2013. Thereafter, the franchise began expanding to other states including Florida, New Jersey, and Georgia. According to a July 2018 Franchising.com article, there are "69 open franchise locations 140 additional contracts in 23 states and two countries". In May 2018, Duck Donuts opened its first New York location in Hauppauge, and two months later in July they opened their inaugural West Coast location in Huntington Beach, California. In December 2018, it had expanded to Minnesota with a Woodbury location. By June 2020 Duck Donuts expanded, opening their first location in Bayamón, Puerto Rico, and in September 2020 the company opened its first store in Dubai, UAE. That store in Dubai was closed later on. On October 2, 2023, their first location in Thailand opened in Bangkok at Siam Discovery. Expansion to the Philippines was announced on January 24, 2024, with plans for 25 locations, their first operational branch opening near Makati City Hall on June 25 and another then under construction at Circuit Makati which opened on July 30.

== Products ==
Duck Donuts' menu predominantly comprises doughnuts, sandwiches, coffee, and desserts. The cake doughnuts at Duck Donuts are made-to-order and customizable, with topping options including chopped bacon and peanuts. The entire doughnut-making process is automated using doughnut makers from Belshaw Adamatic.

Among the four kinds of breakfast sandwiches sold by Duck Donuts is the OBX, which is described as "a sliced doughnut with egg, cheese, sausage or bacon and topped with maple drizzle and chopped bacon". Duck Donuts' dessert selection includes doughnut sundaes made with Breyers ice cream. The company is also known for its seasonal offerings. In 2024, they released their Fall Favorites Dozen that were selling from September 4 through December 1. These include Cinnamon Sugar, S'mores, Bacon in the Sun, French Toast, Coffee Cake, and other offers.
