= Five Daughters Bakery =

Donut bakery

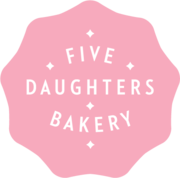
- Type: Private
- Industry: Retail
- Founded: 2015; 11 years ago in Franklin, Tennessee
- Headquarters: Nashville, Tennessee, U.S.
- Number of locations: 10 (as of 2026)
- Key people: Isaac and Stephanie Meek (Founders)
- Products: Donuts
- Website: Five Daughters Bakery

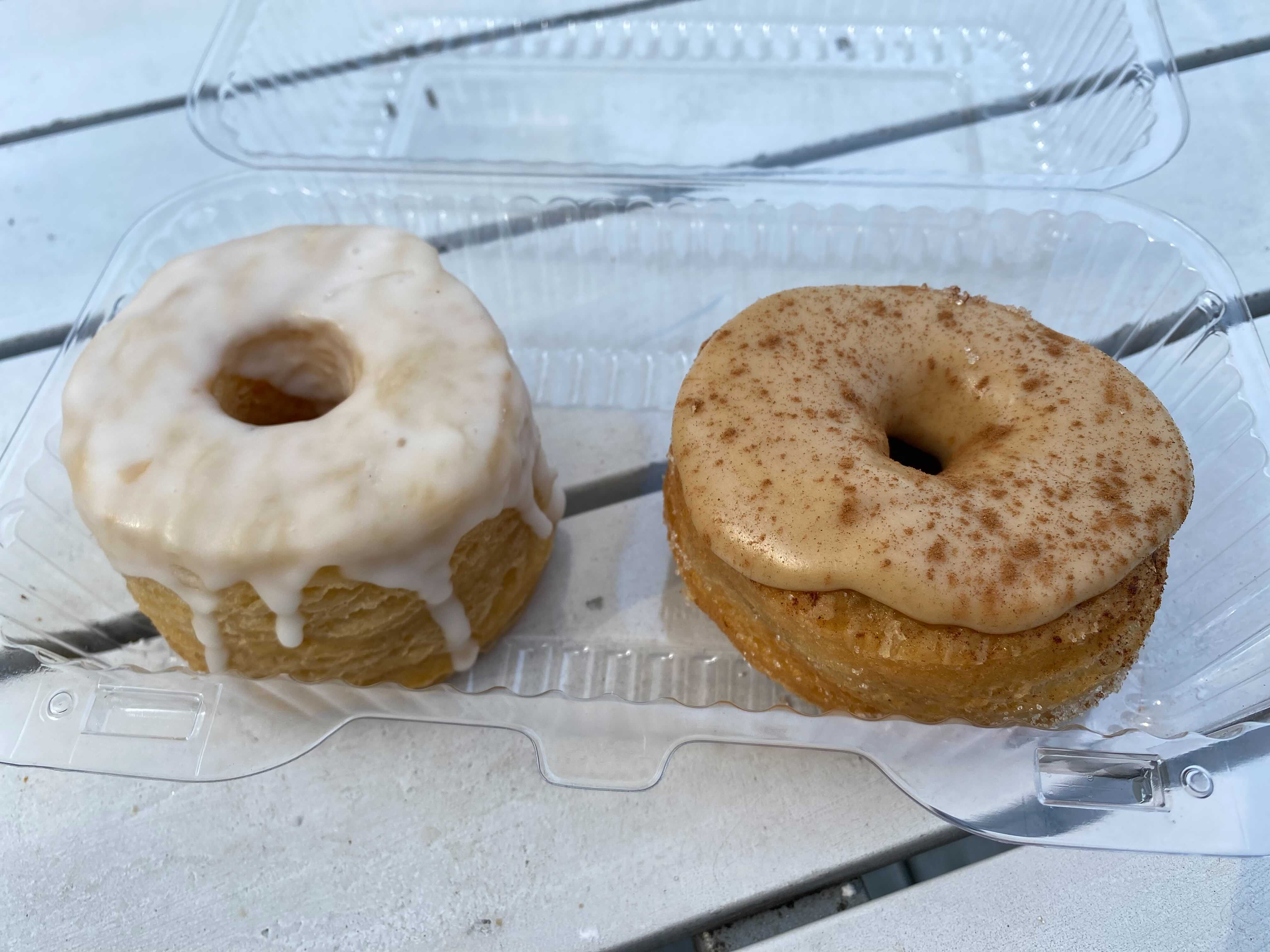
Vanilla-glazed doughnut and maple-glazed doughnut from Five Daughters Bakery in Nashville, Tennessee

Five Daughters Bakery is a family-owned bakery with ten locations (Tennessee and Georgia owned by Isaac and Stephanie Meek. Founded in 2015, the bakery is known for making donuts. They are known for making the 100-layer doughnut which takes three days to make. The signature donut is a cross between a donut and a croissant: a cronut.

== Company details ==
The bakery was started in the couple's Franklin Tennessee home and named after the Meek family's five daughters: Dylan, Lucy, Maggie, Evangeline, and Constance. The bakery uses organic ingredients and rice bran oil for frying. The company became nationally renowned for the three-inch thick 100 Layer Donut. Many celebrities have expressed their infatuation with the donut.

In 2018, the company opened a location in Atlanta, Georgia. In 2019, the company opened a second location in Georgia and several in Florida.

== See also ==
- List of bakery cafés
- List of doughnut shops
- List of doughnut varieties
- List of fried dough foods
- National Doughnut Day
