= Gardena, California =

City in California, United States

- City
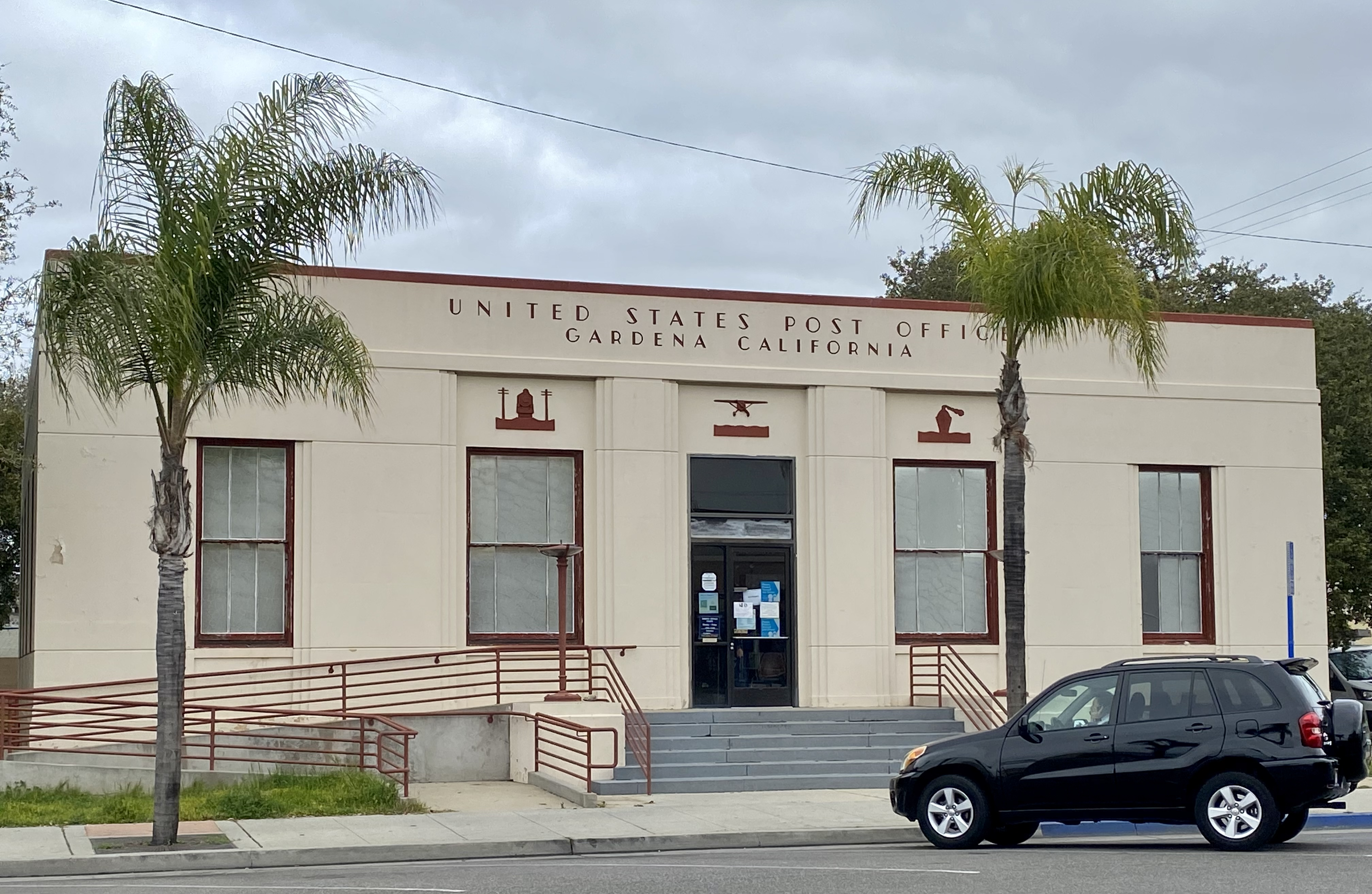
- The United States Post Office in Gardena

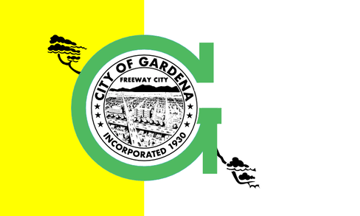
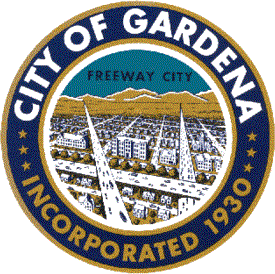
- Flag Seal
- Nickname: "Freeway City"
- Motto: "The City of Opportunity!"
- Interactive map of Gardena, California
- Location in the United States
- Coordinates: 33°53′37″N 118°18′28″W
- Country: United States
- State: California
- County: Los Angeles
- Incorporated: September 11, 1930

Government
  - Mayor: Tasha Cerda
  - Mayor Pro Tem: Mark E. Henderson
  - City Council: Rodney G. Tanaka; Paulette C. Francis; Wanda Love

Area
  - Total: 5.86 sq mi (15.19 km^{2})
  - Land: 5.83 sq mi (15.10 km^{2})
  - Water: 0.035 sq mi (0.09 km^{2}) 0.61%
- Elevation: 49 ft (15 m)

Population (2020)
  - Total: 61,027
  - Density: 10,470/sq mi (4,042/km^{2})
- Time zone: UTC−8 (PST)
  - Summer (DST): UTC−7 (PDT)
- ZIP Codes: 90247–90249
- Area codes: 310/424
- FIPS code: 06-28168
- GNIS feature IDs: 1660664, 2410570
- Website: www.cityofgardena.org

Gardena is a city located in the South Bay region of Los Angeles County, California, United States. The population was 61,027 at the 2020 census, up from 58,829 at the 2010 census. Until 2014, the U.S. census cited the City of Gardena as the place with the highest percentage of Japanese Americans in California. Gardena's Japanese American population contributes to the South Bay region of Los Angeles being home to the highest density of Japanese companies within the mainland United States.

== History ==
Based on archaeological findings, the Tongva people hunted and fished in the area of today's Gardena.

In 1784, three years after the foundation of Los Angeles, Juan Jose Dominguez (1736–1809), a Spanish soldier who arrived in San Diego, California in 1769 with Fernando Rivera y Moncada, in recognition of his military service, received the roughly 43,000-acre (170 km^{2}) Spanish land grant, the Rancho San Pedro. Part of this land contained what became known as Gardena Valley. After the American Civil War veterans bought parts of the land, and soon ranchers and farmers followed suit.

In 1869, Union Army Major General William Starke Rosecrans bought 16,000 acres (65 km^{2}). The "Rosecrans Rancho" was bordered by what later was Florence Avenue on the north, Redondo Beach Boulevard on the south, Central Avenue on the east, and Arlington Avenue on the west. The Rosecrans property was subdivided and sold in the early 1870s. One of those became the 650-acre (2.6 km^{2}) Amestoy Ranch. Gardena proper began in 1887 when the Pomeroy & Harrison real estate developers subdivided the ranch, anticipating the coming of the Los Angeles and Redondo Railway. Civil War veteran Spencer Roane Thorpe is credited with starting the first settlement in Gardena in 1887. Railroads put Gardena on the map following a 1880s Southern California real estate boom.

Some believe the city was named for its reputation for being the only "green spot" in the dry season between Los Angeles and the sea. Because of its acres of berries, the city was dubbed "Berryland". The Strawberry Day Festival and Parade was held each May. The berry industry suffered at the time of World War I as other crops were supported by the war economy.

Japanese Americans settled in Gardena throughout its history. The only way Gardena could protect itself from a heavy county tax imposed on a planned project at a park site was to incorporate. The City of Gardena became incorporated on September 11, 1930.

From 1936 to 1980, Gardena held a local monopoly on legal cardrooms, the taxes from which accounted for nearly a third of its annual budget. As this Los Angeles suburb grew, many Japanese American families moved into the new tract homes being built.

== Geography ==
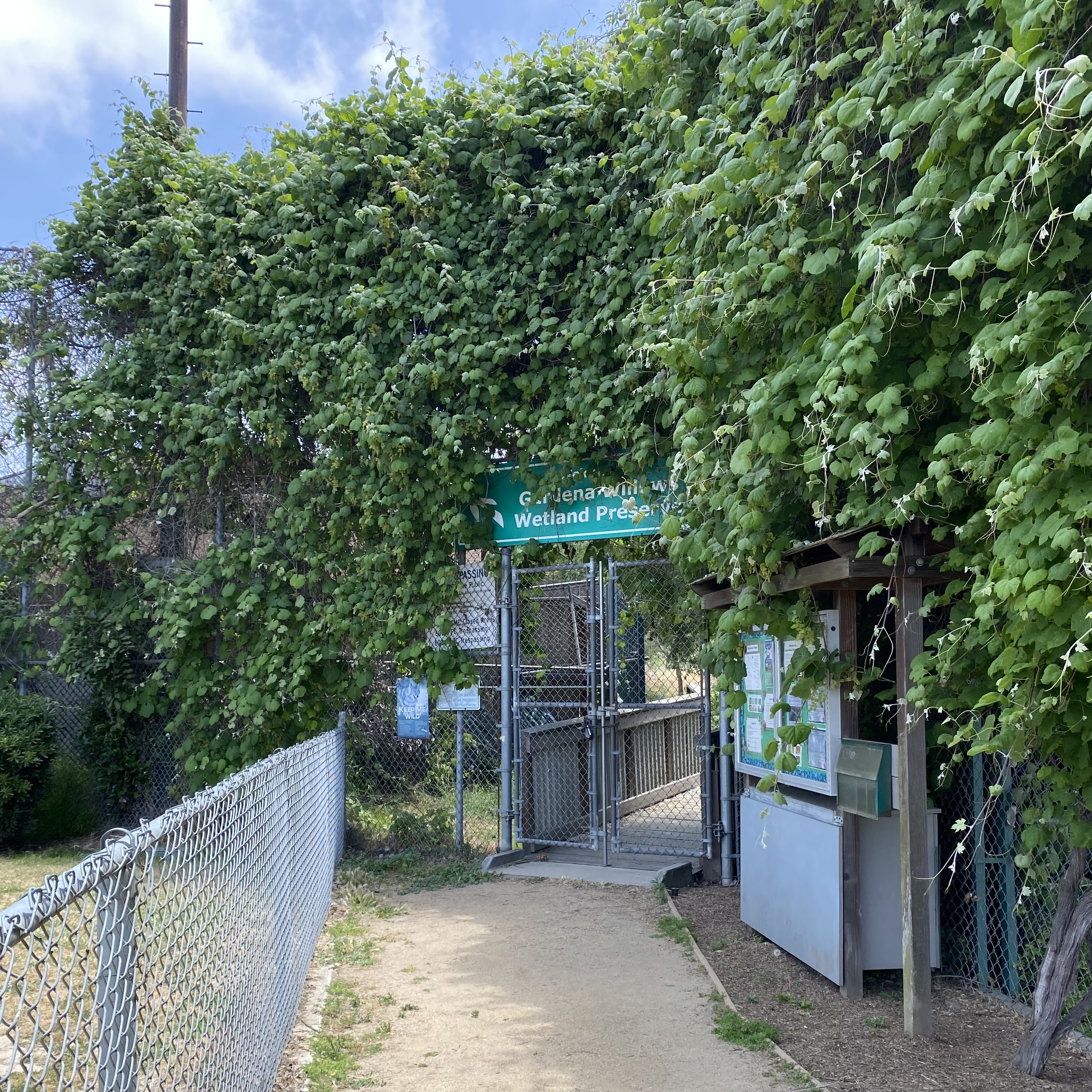
Gardena Willows Wetland Preserve is a remnant of Dominguez Slough

According to the United States Census Bureau, the city has a total area of 5.9 square miles (15 km^{2}), over 99% of which is land. A 9.4-acre (3.8 ha) wetland preserve, the Gardena Willows Wetland Preserve, is located at the southeast corner of Gardena. This is a naturally occurring marshland where water seeps above-ground all year round. It hosts several species of trees and other vegetation.{

Gardena is bordered by the unincorporated community of Athens on the north, the Los Angeles neighborhood of Harbor Gateway on the east and south, Torrance on the southwest, Alondra Park on the west, and Hawthorne on the northwest.

Neighborhoods in Gardena include:

- Hermosillo
- Moneta
- Strawberry Park

== Demographics ==
Historical population
Census	Pop.	Note	%±
1940	5,909		—
1950	14,405		143.8%
1960	35,943		149.5%
1970	41,021		14.1%
1980	45,165		10.1%
1990	49,847		10.4%
2000	57,746		15.8%
2010	58,829		1.9%
2020	61,027		3.7%
U.S. decennial census 1860–1870 1880-1890; 1900 1910 1920; 1930 1940 1950; 1960 1970 1980; 1990 2000 2010; 2020

Gardena first appeared as a city in the 1940 U.S. census as part of Inglewood Township (pop. 38,637 in 1930).

=== Racial and ethnic composition ===
Gardena city, California – racial and ethnic composition Note: the US Census treats Hispanic/Latino as an ethnic category. This table excludes Latinos from the racial categories and assigns them to a separate category. Hispanics/Latinos may be of any race.
Race / ethnicity (NH = Non-Hispanic)	Pop 1980	Pop 1990	Pop 2000	Pop 2010	Pop 2020	% 1980	% 1990	% 2000	% 2010	% 2020
White alone (NH)	14,479	10,471	7,064	5,484	4,819	32.06%	21.01%	12.23%	9.32%	7.90%
Black or African American alone (NH)	10,094	11,443	14,701	14,034	13,006	22.35%	22.96%	25.46%	23.86%	21.31%
Native American or Alaska Native alone (NH)	236	170	129	100	106	0.52%	0.34%	0.22%	0.17%	0.17%
Asian alone (NH)	12,498	16,153	15,363	15,149	15,813	27.67%	32.41%	26.60%	25.75%	25.91%
Native Hawaiian or Pacific Islander alone (NH)	12,498	16,153	381	382	356	27.67%	32.41%	0.66%	0.65%	0.58%
Other race alone (NH)	125	104	145	174	364	0.28%	0.21%	0.25%	0.30%	0.60%
Mixed race or multiracial (NH)	x	x	1,591	1,355	2,060	x	x	2.76%	2.30%	3.38%
Hispanic or Latino (any race)	7,733	11,506	18,372	22,151	24,503	17.12%	23.08%	31.82%	37.65%	40.15%
Total	45,165	49,847	57,746	58,829	61,027	100.00%	100.00%	100.00%	100.00%	100.00%

=== 2020 census ===
As of the 2020 census, Gardena had a population of 61,027, with a population density of 10,469.5 inhabitants per square mile (4,042.3/km^{2}).

The racial makeup was 7,284 (11.9%) White, 13,290 (21.8%) Black or African American, 752 (1.2%) American Indian and Alaska Native, 16,167 (26.5%) Asian, 413 (0.7%) Native Hawaiian and Other Pacific Islander, 15,836 (25.9%) from some other race, and 7,285 (11.9%) from two or more races. Hispanic or Latino residents of any race were 24,503 (40.2%) of the population.

The age distribution was 18.9% under the age of 18, 8.5% aged 18 to 24, 28.0% aged 25 to 44, 27.1% aged 45 to 64, and 17.5% aged 65 or older. The median age was 40.6 years. For every 100 females, there were 91.9 males, and for every 100 females age 18 and over, there were 88.6 males age 18 and over.

The census reported that 98.4% of the population lived in households, 0.4% lived in non-institutionalized group quarters, and 1.3% were institutionalized. 100.0% of residents lived in urban areas, while 0.0% lived in rural areas.

There were 21,571 households, of which 30.7% had children under the age of 18. Of all households, 40.7% were married-couple households, 6.4% were cohabiting couple households, 20.2% had a male householder with no spouse or partner present, and 32.7% had a female householder with no spouse or partner present. About 24.7% of households were made up of individuals, and 10.8% had someone living alone who was 65 years of age or older. The average household size was 2.78, and there were 14,799 families (68.6% of all households).

There were 22,393 housing units at an average density of 3,841.7 units per square mile (1,483.3 units/km^{2}), of which 21,571 (96.3%) were occupied. Of occupied units, 47.3% were owner-occupied and 52.7% were occupied by renters. 3.7% of housing units were vacant, with a homeowner vacancy rate of 0.7% and a rental vacancy rate of 3.0%.

=== 2023 estimate ===
In 2023, the US Census Bureau estimated that the median household income was $79,291, and the per capita income was $35,807. About 7.7% of families and 11.0% of the population were below the poverty line.

=== 2010 census ===
The 2010 United States census reported that Gardena had a population of 58,829. The population density was 10,030.0 inhabitants per square mile (3,872.6/km^{2}). The racial composition of Gardena was 14,498 (24.6%) white (9.3% Non-Hispanic White), 14,352 (24.4%) black, 348 (0.6%) Native American, 15,400 (26.2%) Asian, 426 (0.7%) Pacific Islander, 11,136 (18.9%) from other races, and 2,669 (4.5%) from two or more races. There were 22,151 people of Hispanic or Latino origin, of any race (37.7%).

The Census reported that 58,035 people (98.7% of the population) lived in households, 122 (0.2%) lived in non-institutionalized group quarters, and 672 (1.1%) were institutionalized.

There were 20,558 households, out of which 7,199 (35.0%) had children under the age of 18 living in them, 8,782 (42.7%) were opposite-sex married couples living together, 3,931 (19.1%) had a female householder with no husband present, 1,486 (7.2%) had a male householder with no wife present. There were 1,085 (5.3%) unmarried opposite-sex partnerships, and 104 (0.5%) same-sex married couples or partnerships. 5,142 households (25.0%) were made up of individuals, and 1,921 (9.3%) had someone living alone who was 65 years of age or older. The average household size was 2.82. There were 14,199 families (69.1% of all households); the average family size was 3.39.

The population was spread out, with 13,410 people (22.8%) under the age of 18, 5,353 people (9.1%) aged 18 to 24, 16,656 people (28.3%) aged 25 to 44, 15,086 people (25.6%) aged 45 to 64, and 8,324 people (14.1%) who were 65 years of age or older. The median age was 37.9 years. For every 100 females, there were 92.6 males. For every 100 females age 18 and over, there were 89.8 males.

There were 21,472 housing units at an average density of 3,660.8 per square mile (1,413.4/km^{2}), of which 9,852 (47.9%) were owner-occupied, and 10,706 (52.1%) were occupied by renters. The homeowner vacancy rate was 1.3%; the rental vacancy rate was 4.6%. 28,585 people (48.6% of the population) lived in owner-occupied housing units and 29,450 people (50.1%) lived in rental housing units.

During 2009–2013, Gardena had a median household income of $48,251, with 15.5% of the population living below the federal poverty line.

=== 2000 census ===
As of the 2000 census, there were 57,746 people, 20,324 households, and 14,023 families residing in the city. The population density was 9,921.3 inhabitants per square mile (3,830.6/km^{2}). There were 21,041 housing units at an average density of 3,615.0 per square mile (1,395.8/km^{2}). The racial makeup of the city was 23.82% White, 25.99% Black or African American, 0.64% Native American, 26.82% Asian, 0.73% Pacific Islander, 16.94% from other races, and 5.05% from two or more races. 31.82% of the population were Hispanic or Latino of any race.

Mexican and Japanese were the most common ancestries. Mexico and Korea were the most common foreign places of birth.

=== 1980 ===
In 1980, about 31% of the population was Anglo white, 23% was black, 21% was Japanese, and 17% was Latino. The remainder included a Korean community that was increasing in size and Chinese, Filipino, and Native American people. The National Planning Data Corp. released projected figures in 1987 estimating that of the 50,000 residents, 26.3% were Anglo, 23% were black, 22.7 were Latino, and 28% were of other racial groups. By 1989, Anglo and Japanese residents tended to live in central and southern Gardena. Middle class black people began to move into the Hollypark area in northern Gardena in the 1960s, so the black population was concentrated there.

=== 1970–1978 ===
According to the 1970 U.S. Census, 56% of the population was white. Racial demographic changes occurred until 1978. That year, Mayor Edmond J. Russ declared that according to a special 1978 census, the racial demographics of Gardena had stabilized.

=== Japanese Americans ===
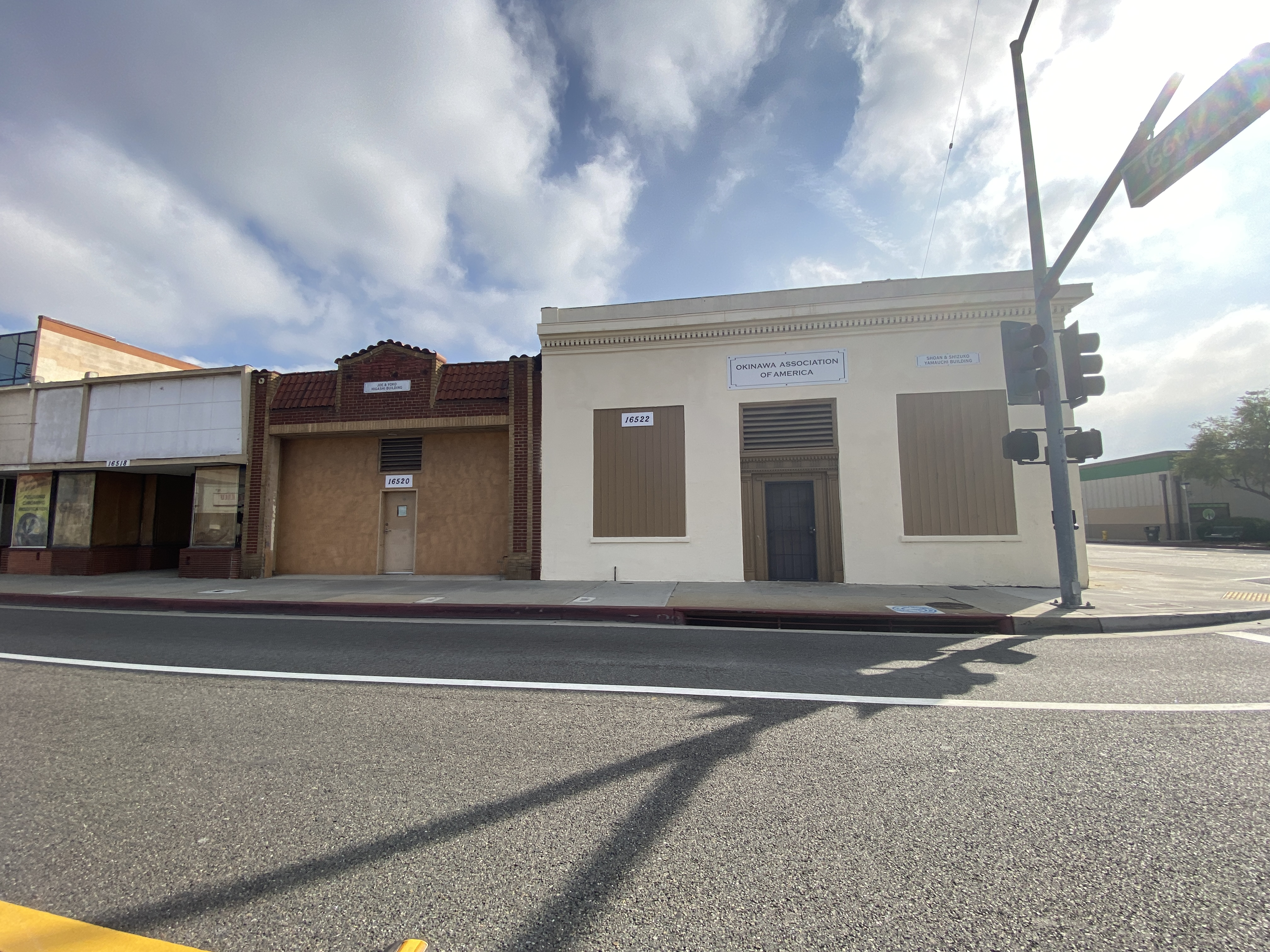
Okinawa Association

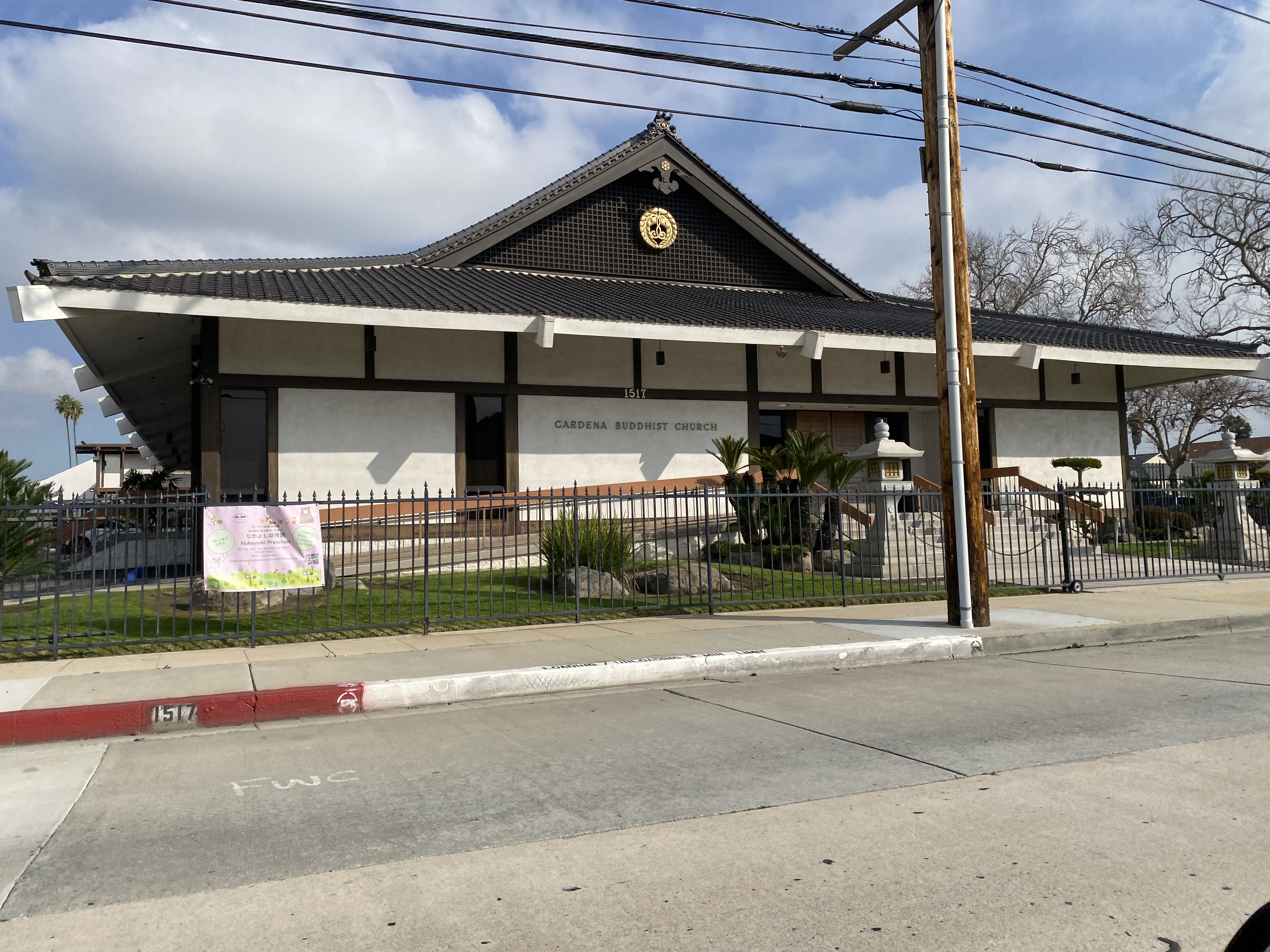
Buddhist temple

Gardena has a large Japanese-American community. Until 2014, it had the second-highest concentration of Japanese Americans in any U.S. municipality, the first being Honolulu. As of 2014, the nearby city of Torrance holds the highest Japanese-American population in the 48 contiguous states.

The Japanese Cultural Institute (JCI) has been is located in Gardena since 1988, and offers cultural and social activities for Japanese Americans. The building used during that year was completed in 1976.

Early in Gardena's history, Japanese migrants played a role in the agrarian economy. The Japanese Association founded the Moneta Japanese Institute in 1911, and the Parents' Association founded the Gardena Japanese School in 1916. Beginning in the 1920s, Japanese American organizations, including the Moneta Gakuen, were established continuously around the current JCI site. The Moneta Gakuen operated a school until the World War II internment.

In 1942 the U.S. military moved the Japanese in Gardena to internment camps.

In 1966, for the first time, a Nisei, Kiyoto Ken Nakaoka, was seated on the city council. Nakaoka later became Gardena's mayor in 1972. In 1980, the city was 21% Japanese, and as of 1989, Japanese residents tended to live in the center and south of the city.

=== Korean Americans ===
As of 1992, about 60% of the Korean population in the South Bay region lived in Gardena and Torrance. By that year, many Korean businesses had been established in Gardena because its commercial land was more affordable than that of Torrance, a middle-class base, and it also had an established East Asian population. In 1990, 2,857 ethnic Koreans lived in Gardena, a 209% increase from the 1980 figure of 924.

== Economy ==
Digital Manga is headquartered in Suite 300 at 1487 West 178th Street. Nissin Foods has its United States headquarters and a plant in Gardena. Nissin Foods (U.S.A.) Co., Inc. opened in Gardena in 1970. Marukai Corporation U.S.A. has its headquarters in Gardena. Nissan's North America headquarters were located in Gardena until they moved to Tennessee in 2006.

National Stores Inc., which operates the Factory 2-U and the Fallas Paredes brands, has its headquarters in the Harbor Gateway area of Los Angeles, near Gardena.

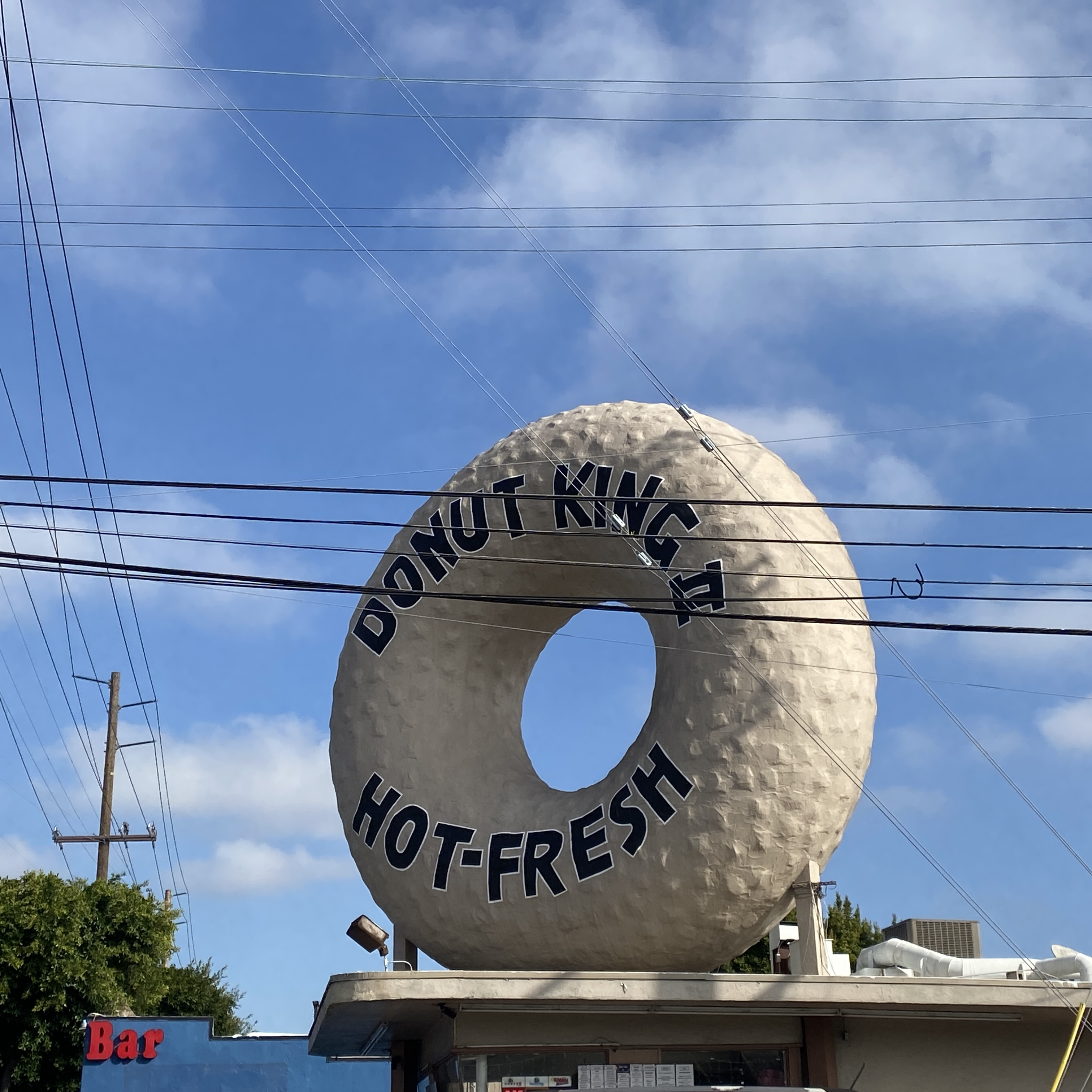
Gardena hosts one of the big donuts of Southern California

=== Top employers ===
According to the city's 2023 Annual Comprehensive Financial Report, the top employers in the city as of 2020 were:

#	Employer	# of Employees
1	United Parcel Service Inc.	789
2	Gardena Memorial Hospital	750
3	Nissin Foods	550
4	Hustler Casino	465
5	Air Fayre	289
6	Avcorp	289
7	Larry Flynt's Lucky Lady Casino	245
8	Southwest Offset Printing	235
9	Kindred Hospital South Bay	225
10	Target	200

== Government ==
In the California State Senate, Gardena is split between the 24th senatorial district, represented by Democrat Ben Allen and the 35th senatorial district, represented by Democrat Laura Richardson. In the California State Assembly, it is split between the 61st Assembly district, represented by Democrat Tina McKinnor and the 66th Assembly district, represented by Democrat Al Muratsuchi.

In the United States House of Representatives, Gardena is in California's 43rd congressional district, represented by Democrat Maxine Waters.

Los Angeles County Animal Care Services operates the Carson/Gardena Animal Care Center in Carson (the facility's mailing address says "Gardena, CA").

== Education ==
=== Primary and secondary schools ===
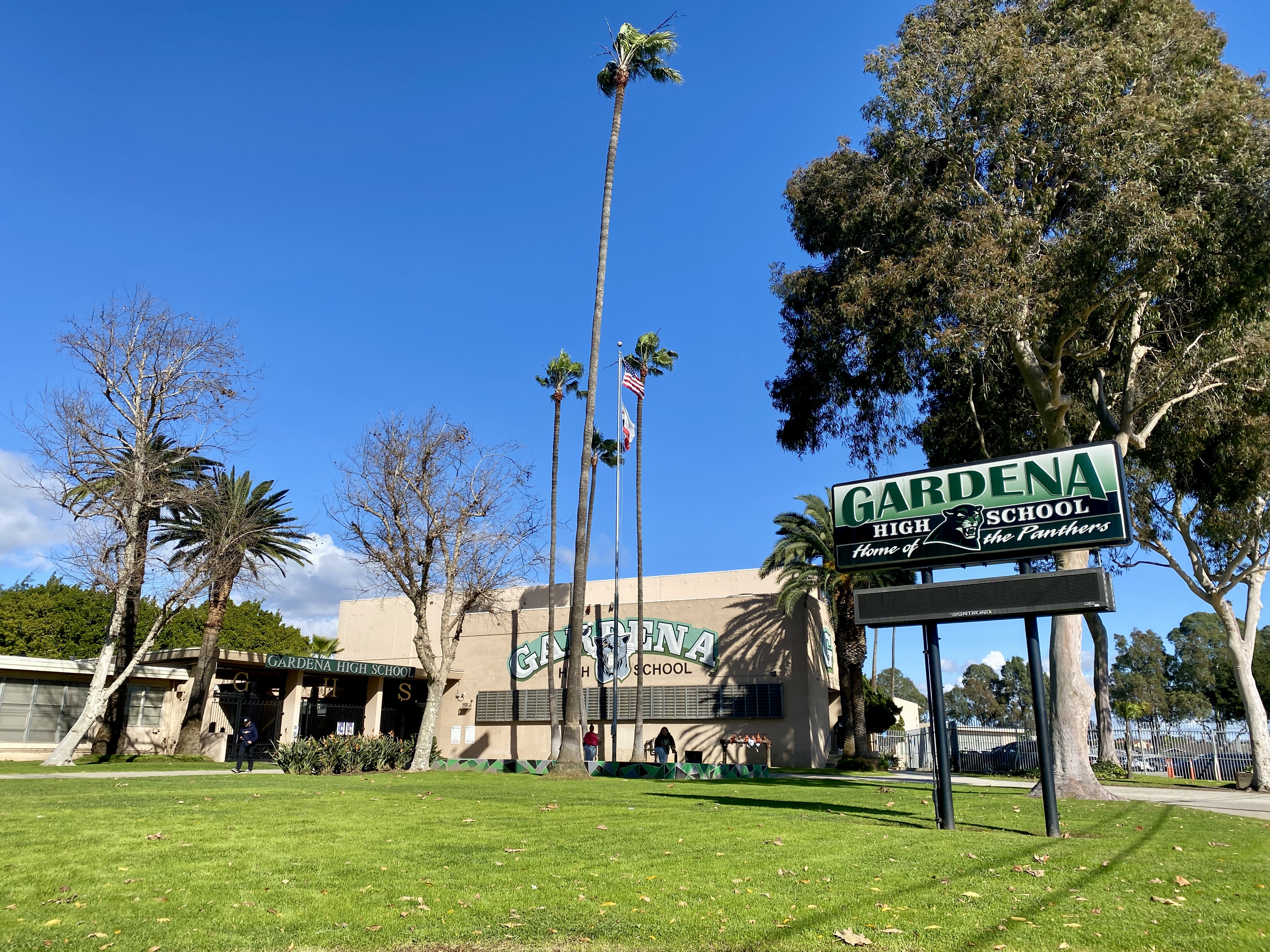
Gardena High School is in Los Angeles, next to Gardena

The Los Angeles Unified School District covers all of Gardena, and operates the city's public schools.

Elementary schools in the city limits include:

- 153rd Street Elementary School
- Amestoy Elementary School
- Chapman Elementary School
- Denker Avenue Elementary School
- Purche Avenue Elementary School

Elementary schools physically in the City of Los Angeles, but with Gardena postal address names, include:

- 186th Street Elementary
- Gardena Elementary School

Zoned middle schools include:

- Peary Middle School (City of Gardena)
  - Some areas in Gardena have a choice between Peary and Henry Clay Middle School. (Los Angeles)

Zoned high schools include:

- Gardena High School (Los Angeles)

In the spring of 1956, the junior high school classes stayed at the old Gardena High School while the high school classes moved into a new building. Up until the opening of the new Gardena High School, high school students held morning shifts, while junior high school students held afternoon shifts.

The northern end of the Gardena HS campus has LAUSD staff housing, Sage Park Apartments.

Area charter schools include:

- Environmental Charter High School - Gardena
- Environmental Charter Middle School - Gardena (located in the City of Los Angeles but has a Gardena address)
- KIPP Generations Academy (opened in 2022 and closed in 2024)

=== Private schools ===
The Roman Catholic Archdiocese of Los Angeles operates Catholic schools in Gardena, including Junípero Serra High School, Maria Regina Catholic School (K-8), and St. Anthony of Padua School (K-8). Pacific Lutheran Jr./Sr. High school, a 6-12 non-Catholic private school, is in Gardena. The Gardena Christian Academy, a PreK-2 Christian school, is in Gardena.

== Infrastructure ==
=== Public services ===
The Gardena Office of Economic Development is a department of the city government. It aids employers in filling a variety of jobs customized to their specific needs. It also helps potential employers in setting up business enterprises.

The Gardena Police Department is the primary law enforcement agency in the city. The department has 89 sworn police officers, 24 full-time support staff, and 33 part-time employees. There are reserve, volunteer, and explorer programs. The current Chief of Police is Todd Fox, appointed in 2025. Radio communications and the 9-1-1 call center are handled by the South Bay Regional Public Communications Authority.

The Los Angeles County Department of Health Services operates the Curtis Tucker Health Center in Inglewood and the Torrance Health Center in Harbor Gateway, Los Angeles, near Torrance and serving Gardena.

The United States Postal Service operates the Gardena Post Office at 1455 West Redondo Beach Boulevard, the South Gardena Post Office at 1103 West Gardena Boulevard, and the Alondra Post Office at 14028 Van Ness Avenue.

=== Libraries ===
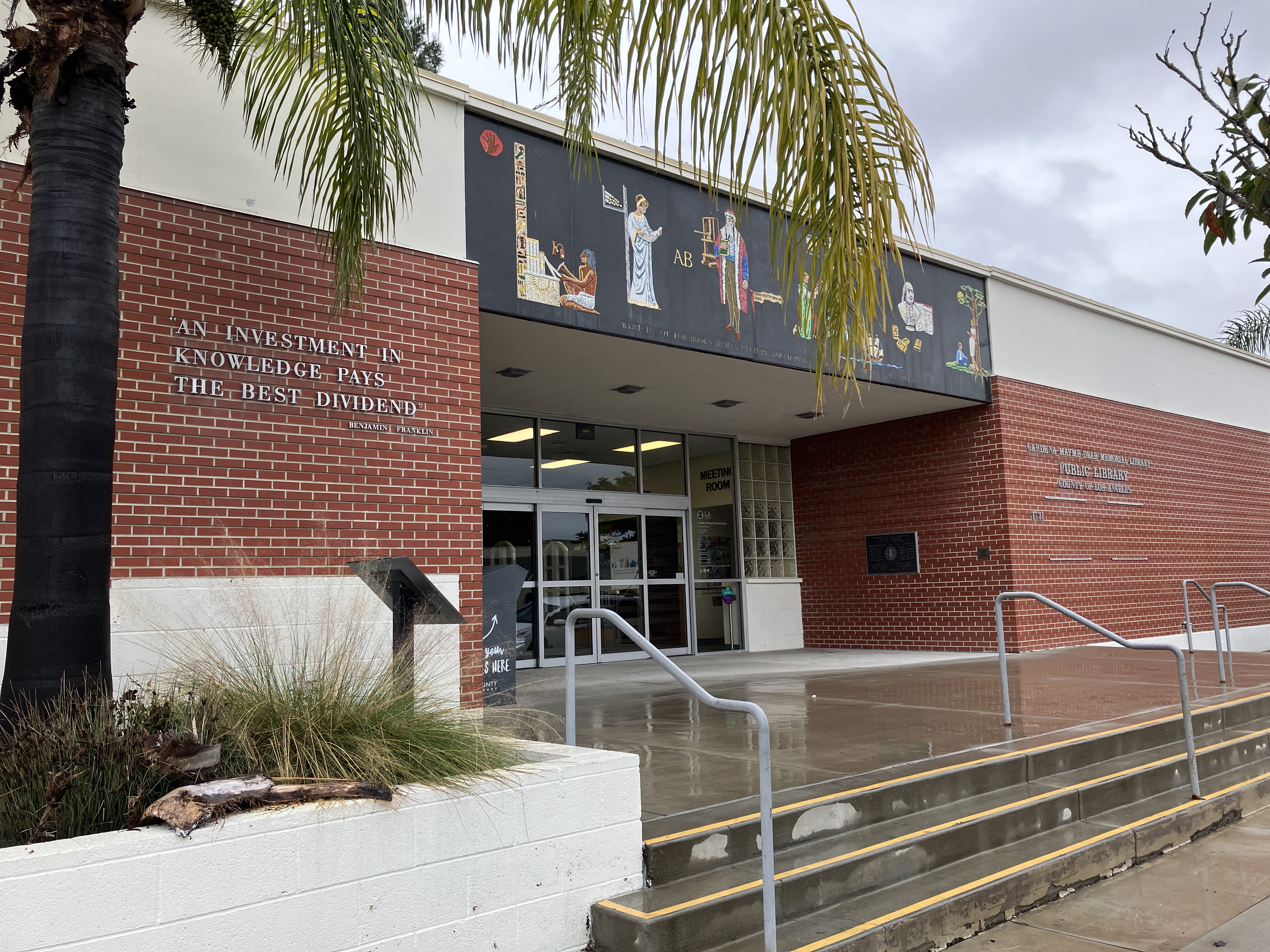
Gardena branch of LA County Library

Gardena Mayme Dear Library, a 16,000-square-foot (1,500 m^{2}) building located in Gardena, and Masao W. Satow Library, located west of Gardena in Alondra Park (El Camino Village), unincorporated Los Angeles County, are operated by the County of Los Angeles Public Library.

Wednesday Progressive Club sponsored the formation of the Gardena Library. In 1913 the Moneta Branch was formed. In 1914 the Gardena Library became a part of the Los Angeles County Free Library system. Due to annexation the library was transferred to the Los Angeles City Library Board. In 1919 the Strawberry Park branch was formed. In August 1951 the Gardena library came back to the county system. In 1958 the Strawberry Park and Moneta branches merged into the West Gardena Branch. The current Gardena library building was dedicated on December 5, 1964. In 1969 a fire forced the West Gardena branch to go to a new location. The current Satow building, dedicated on February 26, 1977, was named after a Japanese American in the community. The Gardena library received its current name on May 30, 1992, and was named after a library volunteer, who had died prior to the renaming.

=== Transportation ===
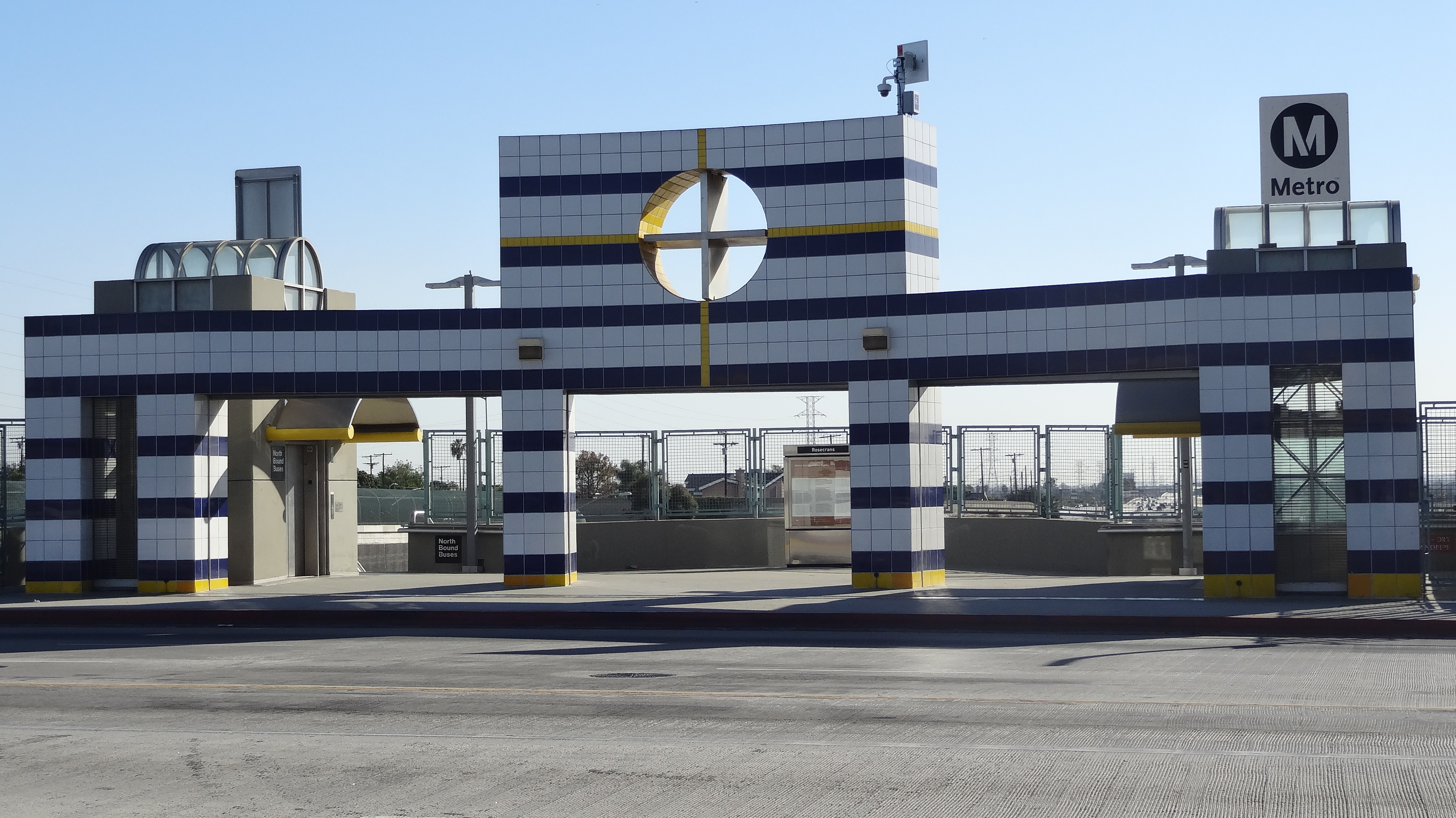
Rosecrans Metro J Line station at Gardena

The city operates the GTrans bus services (formerly as Gardena Municipal Bus Lines).

The National Transportation Safety Board operates the Gardena Aviation Field Office in Harbor Gateway, Los Angeles; it is the regional headquarters of the NTSB Aviation Western Region.

== Notable people ==
- Akwafei Ajeakwa, soccer player
- Paul Bannai, former city councilman and first Japanese American to serve in the California State Legislature
- Beau Bennett, retired hockey player born in Gardena who was the highest-drafted hockey player of all-time to be born and trained in California
- Polly Bergen, actress and singer; lived in Gardena and attended Gardena High School
- Gary Berland, professional poker player; won five World Series of Poker bracelets; born and raised in Gardena
- Ron Block, banjo player, guitarist and singer-songwriter
- Steven Bradford, 1978 Gardena High School graduate; first African American elected to the Gardena City Council (1997–2009); former California Assemblyman (2009–2014)
- Enos Cabell, third baseman with the Baltimore Orioles and Detroit Tigers; attended Gardena High School
- Ed Carmichael, gymnast, 1932 Summer Olympics bronze medalist in the vault.
- Wayne Collett, runner, 1972 Summer Olympics silver medalist in the 400 meter event; attended Gardena High School
- Dock Ellis, pitcher with the Pittsburgh Pirates; attended Gardena High School
- Charlie Evans, running back with the New York Giants and Washington Redskins; born in Gardena
- Robert L. Freedman, screenwriter and playwright; former resident of Gardena
- Gaston Green, running back with the Los Angeles Rams and Denver Broncos; attended Gardena High School
- H.B. Halicki, actor, filmmaker, stuntman; business owner in Gardena and premiered his Gone in 60 Seconds there in 1974
- Juaquin Hawkins, professional basketball player; played with the Houston Rockets during the 2002-2003 NBA season
- Lisa Leslie, Olympic gold medalist and Los Angeles Sparks basketball player; born in Gardena
- Blydell Martin, boxer
- Butch Patrick, actor; was living in Gardena and attending PAE when he auditioned for The Munsters
- Art Pepper, innovative jazz saxophonist; born in Gardena
- Paul Petersen, actor, novelist, activist; former resident of Gardena
- William Rosecrans, Union general, congressman, and ambassador to Mexico; owner of and resident upon (from 1869) "Rosecrans Rancho," the foundation upon which Gardena later emerged
- Kevin A. Ross, host of America's Court with Judge Ross; attended Gardena High School and served as the school's student body president
- Daewon Song, professional skateboarder; resident of Gardena
- George Stanich, high jumper and bronze medalist of the 1948 Summer Olympics; resident of Gardena
- Paul Tanaka, Mayor and council-member
- Dakarai Tucker (born 1994), basketball player for Hapoel Haifa of the Israeli Basketball Premier League
- Tyga, rapper; attended Gardena High School
- Billy Warlock, actor
- Robert Woods, Los Angeles Rams wide receiver

== Sister cities ==
- Huatabampo, Mexico
- Ichikawa, Japan

== See also ==
- Gardena Municipal Bus Lines
- South Bay, Los Angeles
- Ascot Park, a closed racetrack in Gardena
