= Big Donut =

Big Donut could refer to:

- Big Donut, a precursor to Randy's Donuts
- A doughnut shop in Steven Universe, an animated TV series

== See also ==
- Doughnut
