= Felix Chevrolet =

California car dealership

- Felix Chevrolet sign, photographed by Carol M. Highsmith (2013)
- Interactive map of the Felix Chevrolet area

General information
- Location: 3330 South Figueroa Street, Los Angeles, California, United States
- Coordinates: 34.0232°N 118.2831°W

Felix Chevrolet is a car dealership in downtown Los Angeles, California, United States known for its landmark Felix the Cat sign.

== History ==
Felix Chevrolet was founded by Tucson native Winslow B. Felix in 1921. The Mexican-American Felixes were known as a pioneer Arizona family. He went to school in Tucson and "worked for the Arizona Daily Star at one time, delivering papers to Tucson subscribers on a burro, oldtimers recalled." Felix had moved to Los Angeles around 1915. He served in World War I. He sold used cars before opening the Chevrolet dealership in 1921. The original location of the dealership was 11th and Olive Streets. Felix was friends with Felix creator Pat Sullivan; Sullivan let him use the cartoon in advertising in exchange for a free automobile. Beginning in 1923, the dealership used Felix the Cat on its stationery and in newspaper advertisements.

Felix was a "colorful figure"; married with a child, his girlfriend was silent movie star Lois Wilson. In 1931 the dealership relocated to 12th and Grand, where the chromed cars were staged and lit so they looked jewels in a box. In 1931, Felix sponsored midget car races at Gilmore Stadium, and he was a member of the Uplifters Club in Rustic Canyon, where he played polo with the likes of Will Rogers. He also served as president of the Southern California association of motor car dealers for several years.

Felix died at age 43 (or 45) in 1936, from a "basal skull fracture and hemorrhage of the brain" suffered in a polo-field horse collision with Snowy Baker during a match at the Riviera County Club. Baker helped him off the field, despite his own injuries, but Felix died at a Santa Monica hospital following brain surgery.

Felix's widow, Ruth Felix, maintained ownership from 1936 until 1955, although Claude Craig, the company controller, was responsible for hands-on management. She sold the dealership in 1955 to Nickolas N. Shammas, who eventually had large real estate portfolio and a chain of seven dealerships, Mercedes-Benz, Dodge, Nissan, Volkswagen, Porsche, Audi, and Chevrolet-Cadillac, operating as Downtown L.A. Motors. Shammas had had a challenging childhood, including five years in the foster-care system, but he loved working with cars and started "fixing used vehicles for the teachers and principal" at Fairfax High School. Shammas "leveraged this talent" for repair "into a high-end, used-car operation, which he paused to run a war material facility during World War II."

Shammas moved Felix Chevrolet to the current Figueroa Street location in 1957. The landmark sign, designed by painter Wayne E. Heath, was installed in 1957 or 1958. Each side of the three-sided sign is 50 ft (15 m) wide. They reportedly used aerospace engineers to ensure that the huge sign would not turn into a sail and blow away in a strong wind. The building was originally in a Spanish Colonial Revival style and later remodeled into Streamline Moderne, and has been "altered dozens of times" since. In 1965 after the Watts riots led several nearby dealers to move their operations elsewhere in the city, Shammas bought their lots, eventually assembling a 27-acre (11 ha) parcel along Figueroa. He later became a philanthropist, supporting a number of charities and the Lebanese-American community in the city.

In 1992, following the Los Angeles riots, Shammas asked his son-in-law, history professor Darryl Holter, to help him with the business. Shammas died in 2003. Holter owned Felix Chevrolet from 1995 to 2022. He used his skills as a "former labor organizer and activist" to organize "an alliance with the University of Southern California" (where his wife and Nickolas N. Shammas' daughter Carole Shammas chaired the history department) to develop a business improvement district, eventually assembling a business cluster of "12 dealerships, selling more than 3,000 cars a month." Houlter also added a four-story structure to the Felix Chevrolet lot, for the service and parts departments, and additional parking. In December 2022, Houlter sold Felix Chevrolet to Rinaldi Halim "owner of a Chrysler Dodge Jeep Ram store a few blocks away from Felix Chevrolet" and Open Road Capital.

The sign, located adjacent to the Harbor Freeway, the University of Southern California (USC) campus, and the Shrine Auditorium, is considered an "iconic" landmark of the area. The Los Angeles Cultural Heritage Commission recommended landmark status for the sign in 2007 but the Los Angeles City Council declined to pass the designation into municipal law. Originally lit in neon, LEDs bulbs were installed in 2012 to "reduce escalating maintenance costs." Felix Chevrolet merchandise yields up to $10,000 a month to the dealership, which then sends a 10 percent cut to current Felix trademark holder, DreamWorks Animation/Comcast NBCUniversal. Felix Chevrolet iconography is popular in the lowrider customized car community.

== Gallery ==
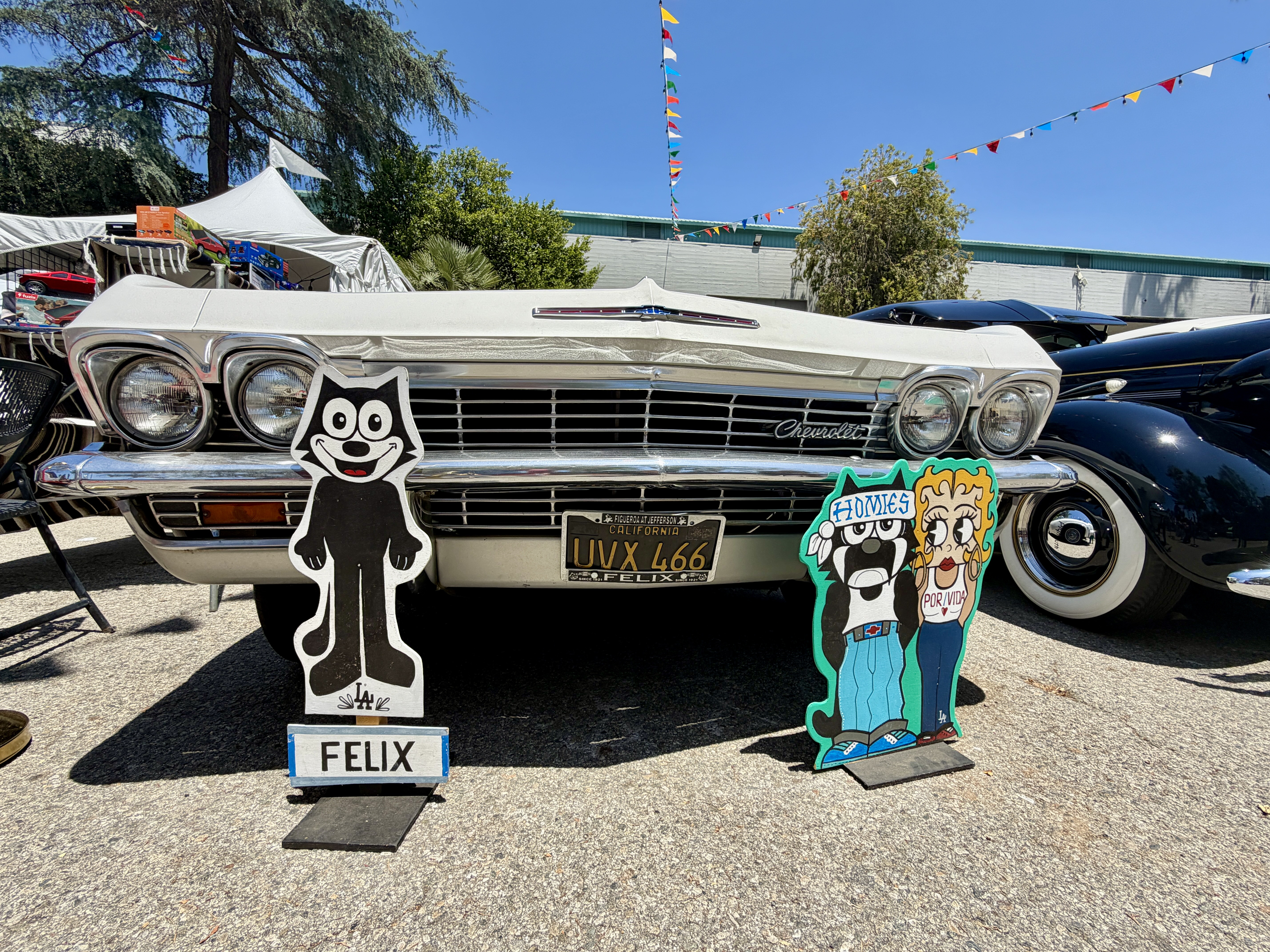
Lowrider Chevrolet with Felix imagery (2026)

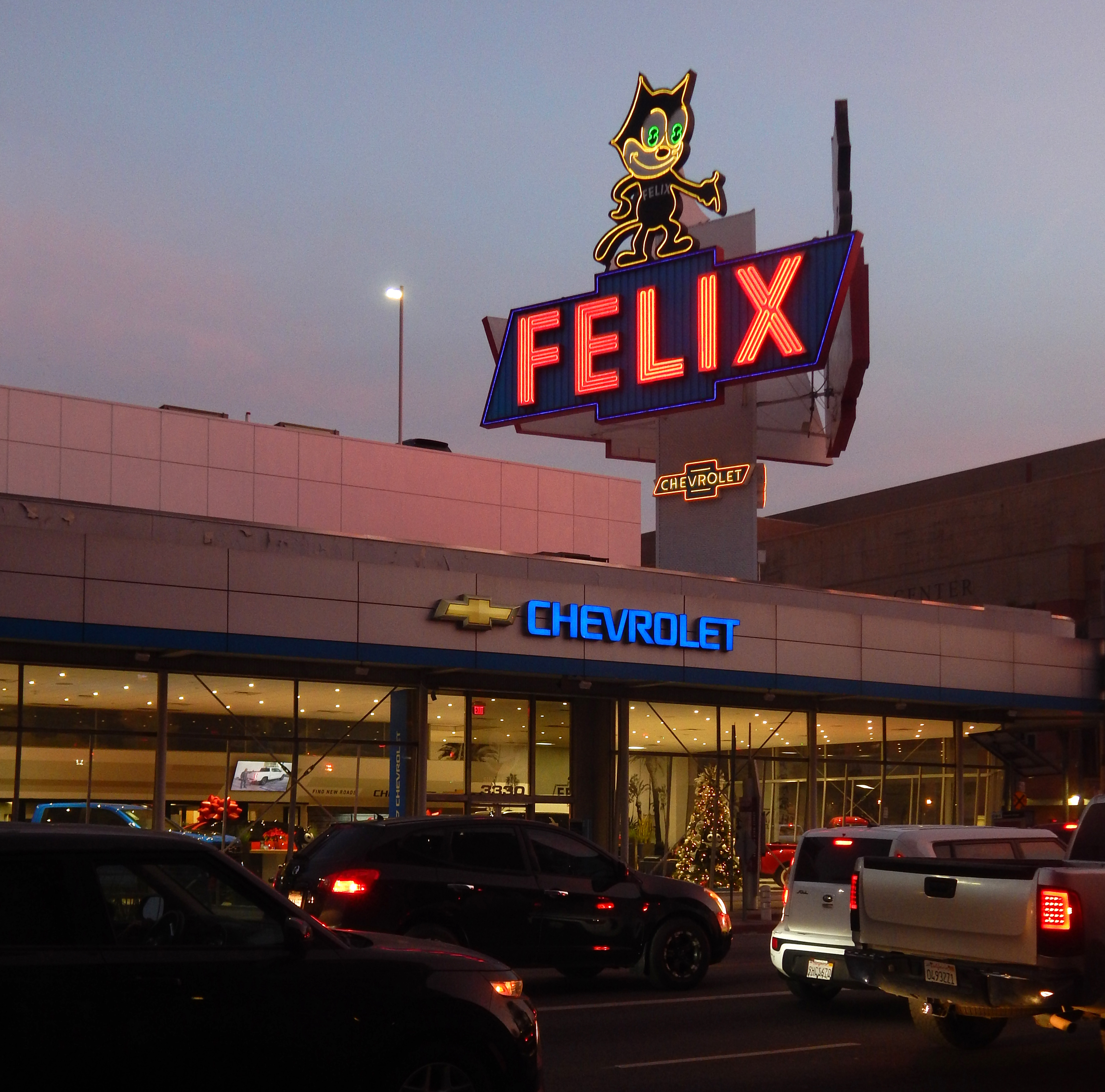
Felix sign (2024)

Felix sign (1977)

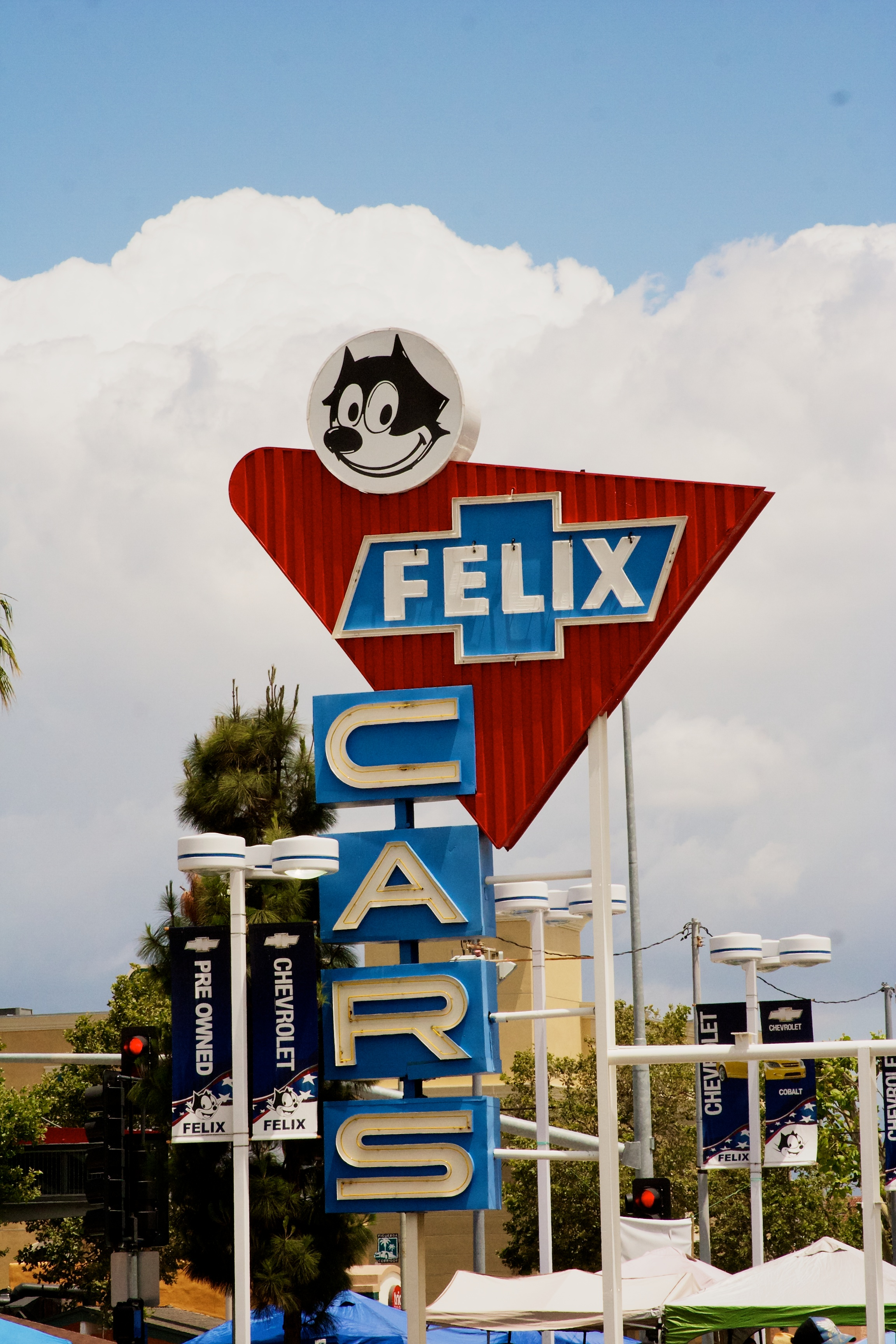
Felix Cars (2011)

Giant Felix Used Cars (1977)

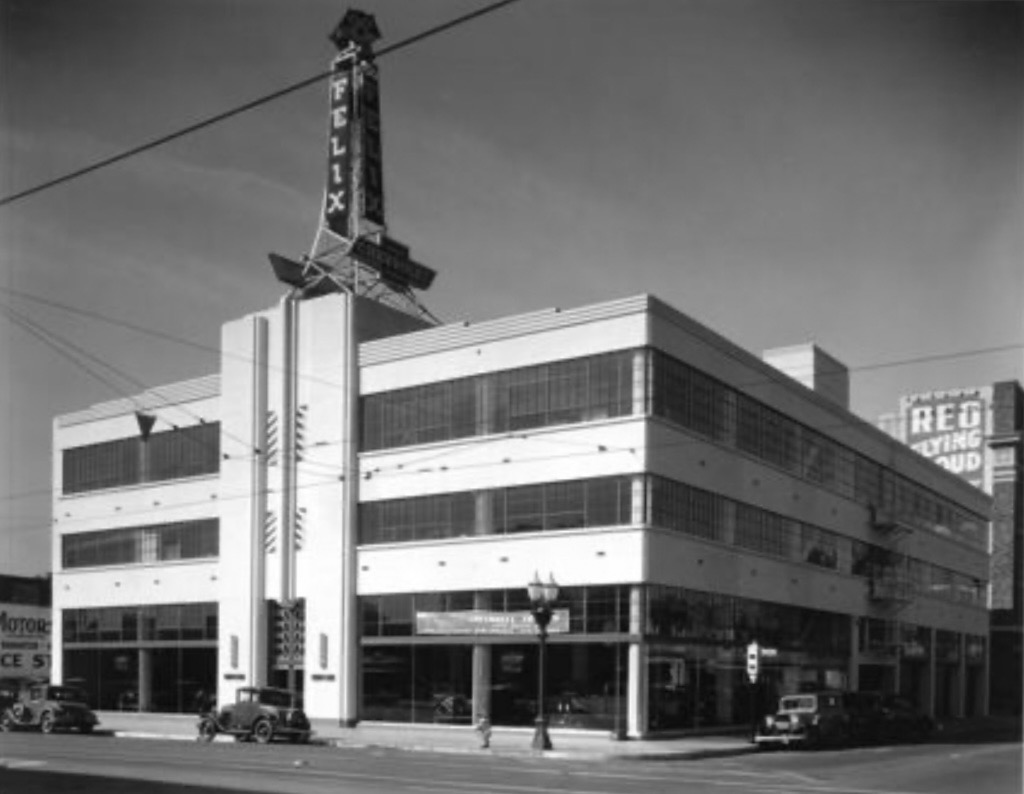
Winslow Felix Chevrolet, 12th and Grand Street (1930)

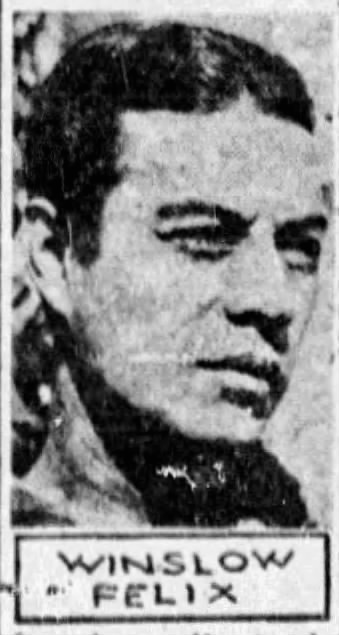
Winslow Felix (c. 1931)

== See also ==
- Big donuts of Southern California
- 1950s American automobile culture
- Casa de Cadillac
