= The Donut Hole =

Landmark bakery in California

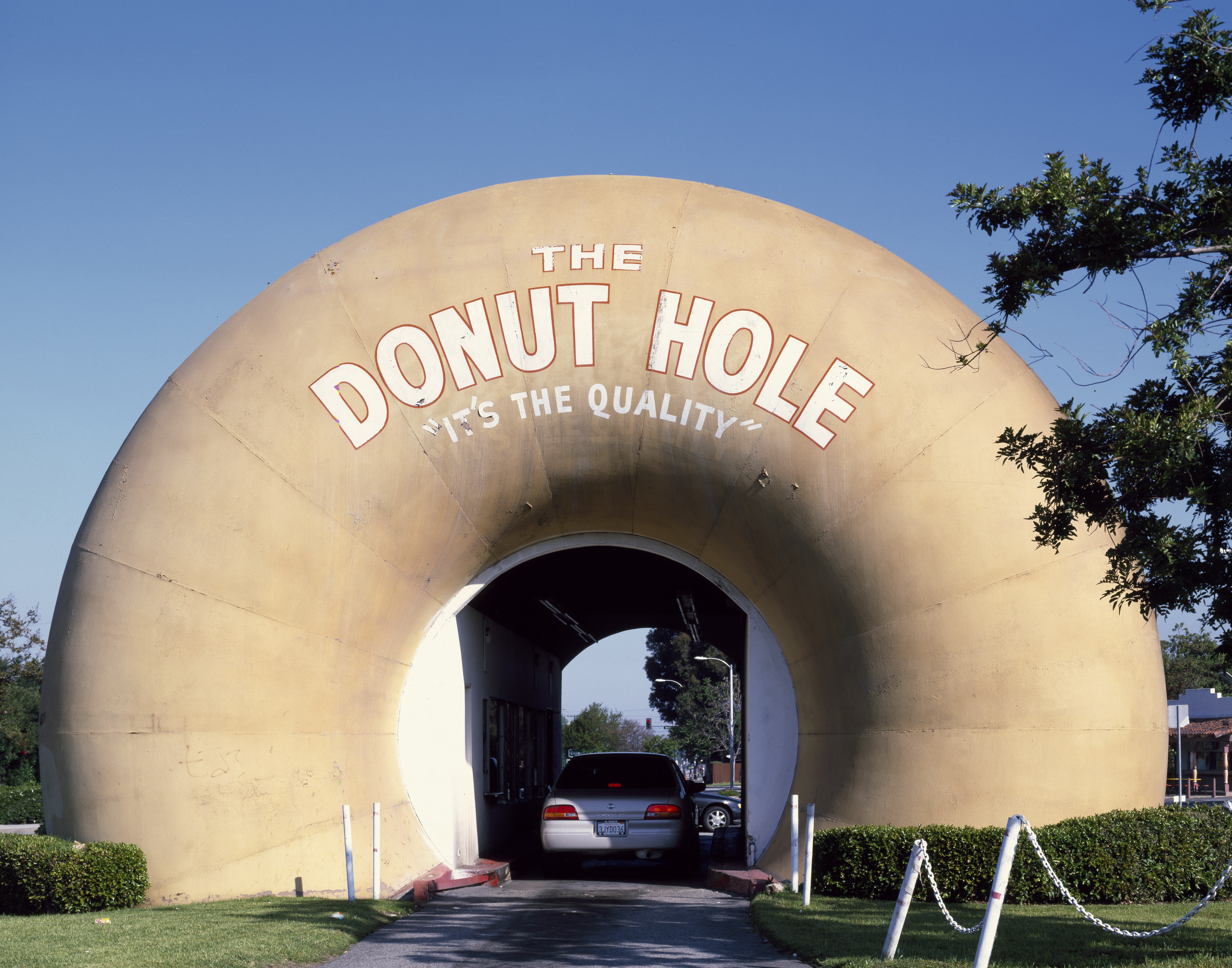
- Interactive map of The Donut Hole

Restaurant information
- Established: 1963
- Location: La Puente, California, United States
- Coordinates: 34°2′14″N 117°57′6″W

The Donut Hole is a bakery and landmark in La Puente, California. An example of programmatic architecture, the building is shaped like two giant donuts through which customers drive to place their orders. The bakery is one of the most photographed donut shops in the United States.

== History ==
The first Donut Hole opened in 1963, in La Puente, California. According to one source, the shop in La Puente was the second to open, in 1968, and was followed by three others. However, various sources disagree and date the building's original construction from 1947 to 1958 to 1962. What is certain is that the donut chain went out of business in 1979. The La Puente donut hole was purchased by the Lopez family in 1979 and remained in the family until 2003. The Covina branch was completely remodeled and the others were demolished, and only the La Puente location remains today as a working bakery.

It is a local tradition for newlyweds to drive through the donuts; some cite good luck as the reason, while others credit the sexual symbolism. The building has been struck by cars several times in its history, most recently in 2004 when an out-of-control car crashed through one of the donut facades.

== Pop culture ==
The building was featured in the movie Moving Violations where Chief Fromm's car was bashed.

It is shown in the opening scenes of the 1987 film Dragnet.

The building is also shown in a music video for the song "On an Axis" by American music producer Oneohtrix Point Never.

== See also ==
- List of doughnut shops
- Randy's Donuts
- Big donuts of Southern California
