= Blydell Martin =

American boxer

Blydell Martin was born in Gardena, California and raised in Kansas City, Missouri. He was the winner of the 2010 National Radio Talent contest hosted by KPRS Hot 103 Jamz in Kansas City and has since toured with artists such as Nelly, Fat Joe, and Lil Jon. Since the release of his second album, 20-N-2 The Mix Tape (in which 20 songs were written and recorded in two weeks), he has worked full time for Title Boxing and instructs boxing classes in Olathe, Kansas. He was the Golden Gloves champion in 2001, a Golden Gloves finalist in 2004 and won the Missouri State Heavyweight championship in 2002.
