= Casa de Cadillac =

Car dealership in Sherman Oaks, California

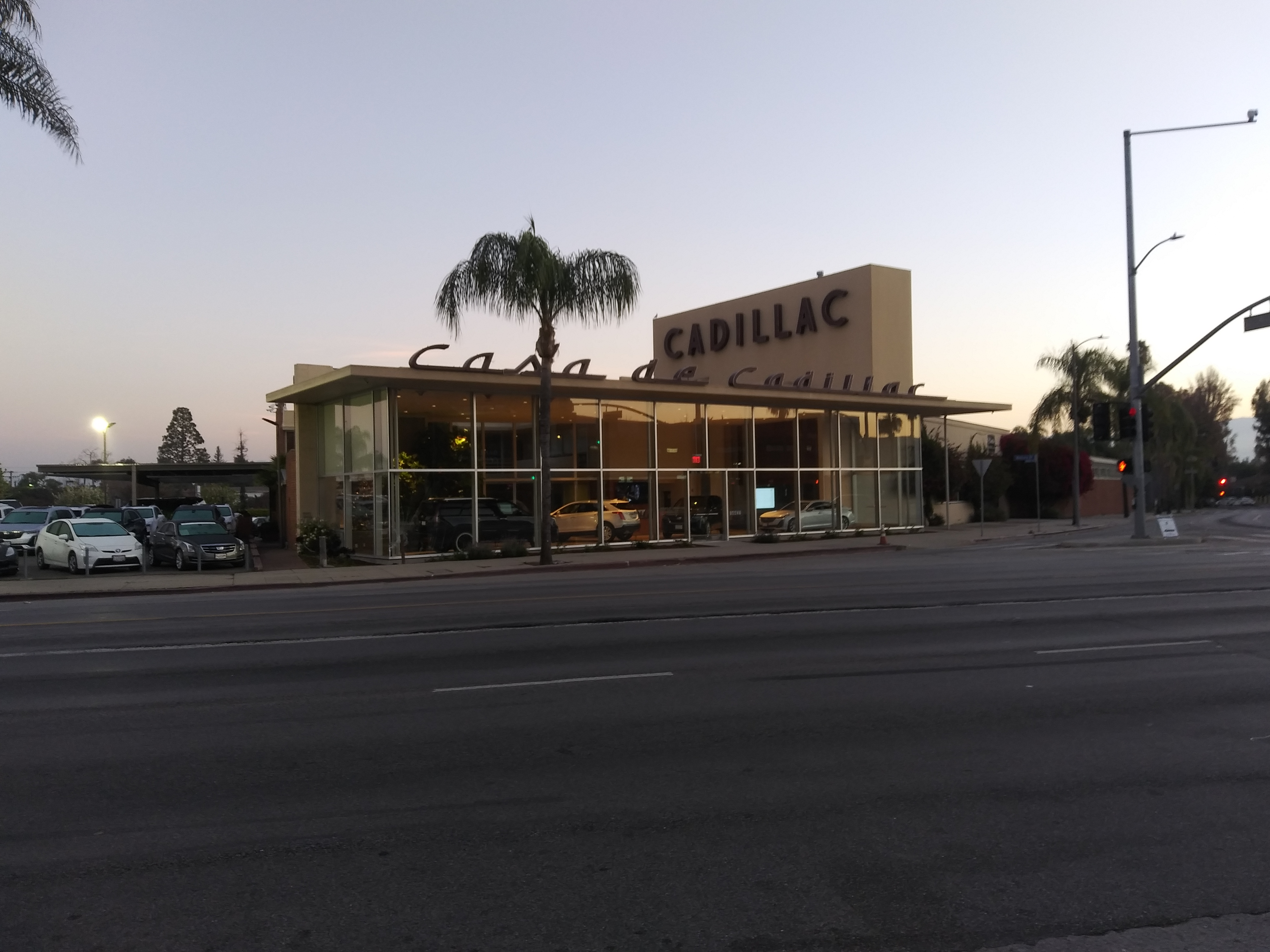
- Casa de Cadillac (2020)
- Industry: Automotive
- Founded: 1949 (as Don Lee Motors)
- Headquarters: Sherman Oaks, California
- Products: Automobiles; Automotive parts
- Parent: Casa Automotive Group
- Website: www.casadecadillac.com

Casa de Cadillac is a Cadillac dealership located at 14401 Ventura Boulevard, in Sherman Oaks, California. Due to its classic Googie architecture and tenure in the area, the dealership building, built in 1949, has become an architectural landmark in the San Fernando Valley.

== History ==
Casa de Cadillac opened in 1950 at 14401 Ventura Boulevard and has operated continuously in the same facility since that time. The dealership originally opened in 1949 as Don Lee Motors which was part of the Don Lee organization that operated Cadillac dealerships throughout the state of California, including major cities such as Fresno, Sacramento, Oakland, San Francisco, Pasadena, and Los Angeles.

Ownership of the dealership passed from Lee to Martin Pollard in 1950 who changed the name to Casa de Cadillac. Pollard was influential in local business and an active member of the San Fernando Valley community. He served at various times as the President of Valley Presbyterian Hospital, President of the Sherman Oaks Chamber of Commerce, and was the first chairman of the Los Angeles Metropolitan Transit Authority. In 1959, Pollard was the first ever recipient of the "Fernando Award" given by the Fernando Award Foundation in recognition of outstanding community volunteerism in the San Fernando Valley. Upon Pollard's death in 1970, the Sherman Oaks branch of the Los Angeles Public Library was named in his honor.

== Acquisition ==
After Pollard's death, James Wilson became president of Casa de Cadillac and was active in its daily operations through 2008. During that time, Casa Automotive Group (the parent company of Casa de Cadillac) acquired several additional franchises including Buick, GMC, Hummer, Saab, Kia, and Subaru. In 2008, Wilson passed ownership to his daughter and son-in-law, Susan and Howard Drake. Today, Cadillac, Buick and GMC are sold in Sherman Oaks while Subaru is sold in nearby Van Nuys.

== Architecture ==
Designed by Randall Duell in 1948, Casa de Cadillac is now considered a prime example of Googie architecture. It has been included in modern architectural walking tours organized by the Modern Committee of the Los Angeles Conservancy and Los Angeles Times and has become a popular location for photography and filming.

== Popular culture ==
- During the 1970s and 1980s, television game shows like Let's Make a Deal and Sale of the Century gave away many new Cadillac automobiles announcing, during the description of the specific model, that the cars given were from Casa de Cadillac.

- In A Friend Indeed, the season three finale of the popular and enduring Columbo detective series, Casa de Cadillac is featured in the episode. Lieutenant Columbo visits the dealership and parks his junk Peugeot 403 behind a front row of multi-hued 1971, '72 and '73 Cadillacs, and behind that a row of 1974 models, including 2 Eldorados. The rain droplets on the lacquer of the new cars contrasts beautifully with the primer of Columbo's 20 year old Peugeot, for which Columbo has been generously offered $80.00 in a trade. Also noteworthy were the large gold Cadillac crests on the signs for the dealership, which were obviously erected in 1952–1953, rendered in gold for Cadillac's 50th anniversary.

- In Michael Bay's Transformers, the character Jazz drops down from the roof of the Casa De Cadillac dealership before transforming into vehicle form to meet with the other Autobots at Bumblebee's location.

- In the 1985 Arnold Schwarzenegger action film Commando, the character Cooke (portrayed by actor Bill Duke) commandeers a new 1985 Cadillac Fleetwood in the dealer showroom and drives it through the display window.

- In Tom Petty's "Free Fallin" (1989), Casa de Cadillac stands prominently across the street from the pink Future Dogs hot dog stand.

- In NBC's Up All Night, Christina Applegate and Will Arnett look for a potential new family car.

- Part of the 2004 "Make Room for Caddy" episode of The Bernie Mac Show was filmed in the Casa de Cadillac showroom.

- In the opening of San Fernando Valley natives HAIM "Want You Back" music video.

== See also ==
- Felix Chevrolet
