= Gardena Office of Economic Development =

Coordinates: 33.8837°N 118.3066°W

The Gardena Office of Economic Development is a department of the city government of Gardena, California whose purpose is to attract new business, and to stimulate job creation by providing services to businesses and industries relocating to or expanding in the city.
