= Randall Duell =

American architect

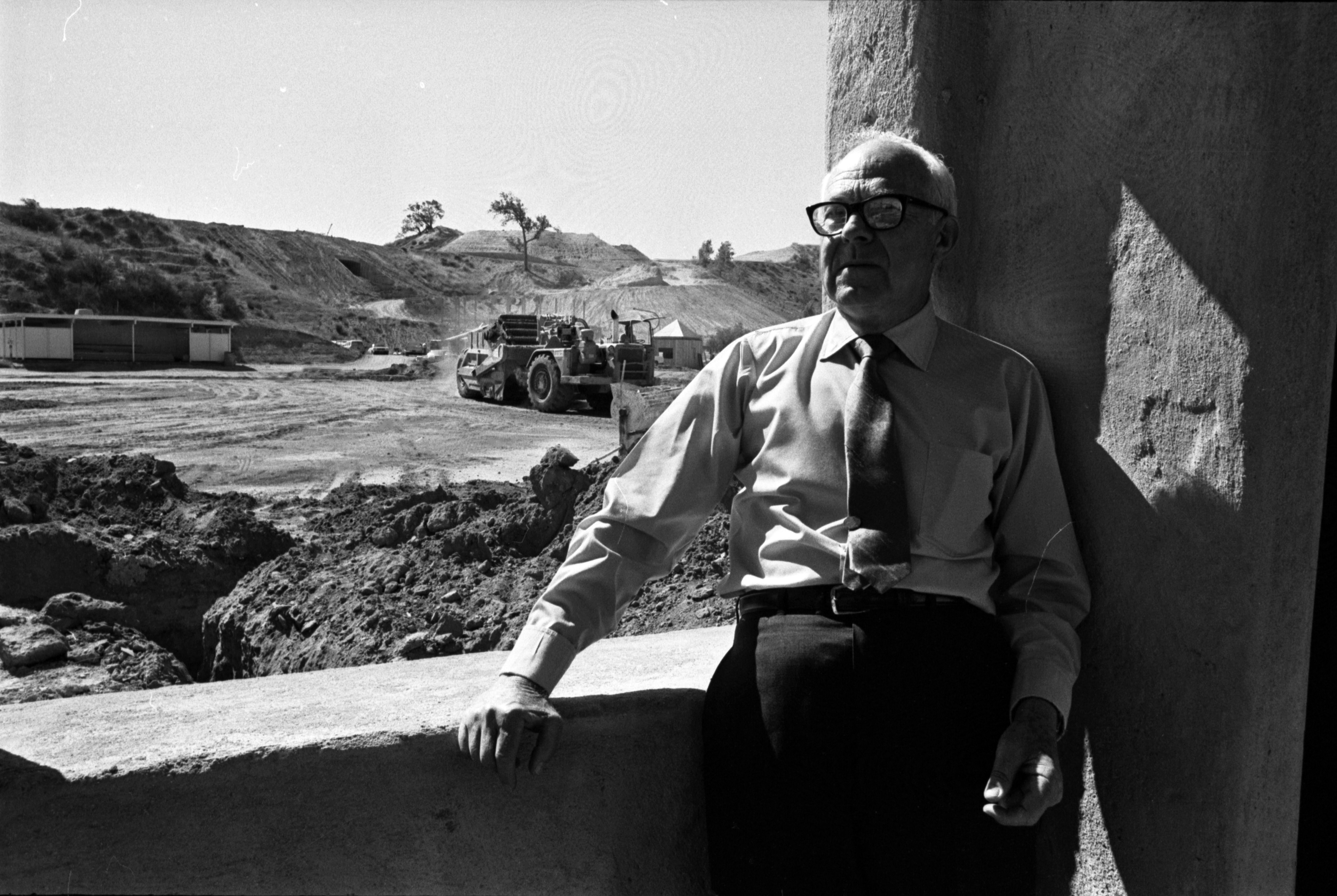
- Duell during the construction of Magic Mountain in 1970
- Born: July 14, 1903; Russell County, Kansas
- Died: November 28, 1992 (aged 89); Los Angeles, California
- Occupations: Art director and architect
- Years active: 1925-1992
- Spouse: Rachel (née Coleman) (m. 1925)
- Children: Roger

Randall Duell (July 14, 1903 – November 28, 1992) was an American architect and motion picture art director. He designed Magic Mountain theme park in Santa Clarita, California, the original Universal Studio Tours in California, Six Flags Over Texas, Marriott's Great America theme parks, as well as Opryland in Nashville, Tennessee.

== Career ==
Duell was born on a farm in Russell County, Kansas, moved with his family to Los Angeles, California in 1912, and died of a stroke in Los Angeles, California.

Duell attended the University of Southern California School of Architecture and graduated in 1925. Joining the Los Angeles architectural firm Webber, Staunton and Spaulding, Duell contributed to designs for notable building projects in metropolitan Los Angeles during the 1920s and 1930s, among them the Avalon Casino on Catalina Island, Frary Dining Hall and adjacent residence halls at Pomona College, and Greenacres, the estate of silent movie actor Harold Lloyd in Beverly Hills. He and architect Sumner Spaulding collaborated in the design of the Atkinson residence in Bel Air, which was modeled after the Petit Trianon at Versailles.

As construction declined during the Great Depression, Metro-Goldwyn-Mayer hired Duell in 1936 to design the set of the Capulet home in Irving Thalberg's production of Romeo and Juliet. In 1937, he joined the MGM art department in a full-time capacity. During his career as a motion picture art director, he was nominated for three Academy Awards in the category Best Art Direction. He received screen credit for his work on 38 films, among them Ninotchka (1939), The Postman Always Rings Twice (1946), Intruder in the Dust (1949), and Singin' in the Rain (1952). Additionally he worked on a number of motion pictures without film credit, among them The Wizard of Oz, 1939. He retired from MGM in 1959.

During most of his career at MGM, Duell maintained an outside architectural practice and designed residential and commercial buildings in Southern California. Notable among his designs during this period is Casa de Cadillac, a car dealership in Sherman Oaks built in 1948 which is now considered a prime example of Googie architecture.

=== Theme park design ===
Following his departure from MGM in 1959, he joined Marco Engineering, founded by C. V. Wood, who had supervised the construction of Disneyland; at Marco, Duell collaborated with Wood and Wade Rubottom in the design of Freedomland U.S.A. in The Bronx, the first of many theme parks he would design. At Freedomland, Duell designed many of the park structures and specified the color scheme for the Santa Fe Rail Road and other areas of the park. He is featured in the book, Freedomland U.S.A.: The Definitive History (Theme Park Press, 2019). In addition, at Marco Duell assisted in the design of Pleasure Island in Wakefield, Massachusetts.

The following year, Duell left Marco Engineering and established R. Duell and Associates with his wife Rachel, a Santa Monica-based architectural practice which specialized in the design of theme parks. Marrying traditional architecture with stagecraft, the firm designed many theme parks in America. Most of the parks include what is now known as the Duell loop, first implemented at Six Flags Over Texas; the primary guest path forms a complete circuit through the park so visitors can visit each attraction. One notable exception was at Magic Mountain, where the developers ran short of money before a planned tunnel could be dug to connect the loop at the rear of the park.

Selected list of theme parks designed by Duell Associates
Park	City	State / Country	Year	Notes
Six Flags Over Texas	Arlington	TX	1961	Project started by Angus Wynne and Tommy Vandergriff, who hired Marco Engineering, then convinced Duell to form his own company.
Texas Pavilion at the 1964 World's Fair	New York City	NY	1964	
Universal Studios Tour	Universal City	CA	1964	
Six Flags Over Georgia	Austell	GA	1967	Wynne's second park
AstroWorld	Houston	TX	1968	Duell's commission for AstroWorld led to Six Flags designing the Mid-America park by itself.
Lion Country Safari	Irvine	CA	1970	
Six Flags Magic Mountain	Valencia	CA	1971	
Hersheypark	Hershey	PA	1972	
Opryland	Nashville	TN	1972	
Carowinds	Charlotte	NC	1973	
Worlds of Fun	Kansas City	MO	1973	
Six Flags Great America	Gurnee	IL	1976	Twin parks originally named Marriott's Great America
California's Great America	Santa Clara	CA	1976	Twin parks originally named Marriott's Great America
Bellewaerde Park	Zillebeke, West Flanders	Belgium	1980?	
Darien Lake	Corfu	NY	1981	
Dunia Fantasi	Jakarta	Indonesia	1985?	
Parc Astérix	Paris	France	1989	
MGM Grand Adventures Theme Park	Las Vegas	NV	1993	

The Duell office employed the talents of a number of former motion picture art directors and theme park designers, among them Robert H Branham, Leroy Coleman, John DeCuir, John DeCuir, Jr., Roger Duell, Paul Saunders, Ira West, Harry Webster, Art Pieper, and Paul Groesse.

Duell was inducted into the International Association of Amusement Parks and Attractions Hall of Fame in 1993.

== Selected filmography ==
Duell was nominated for three Academy Awards for Best Art Direction:

- When Ladies Meet (1941)
- Random Harvest (1942)
- Blackboard Jungle (1955)
