= Randy's Donuts =

Landmark building in Inglewood, California, U.S.

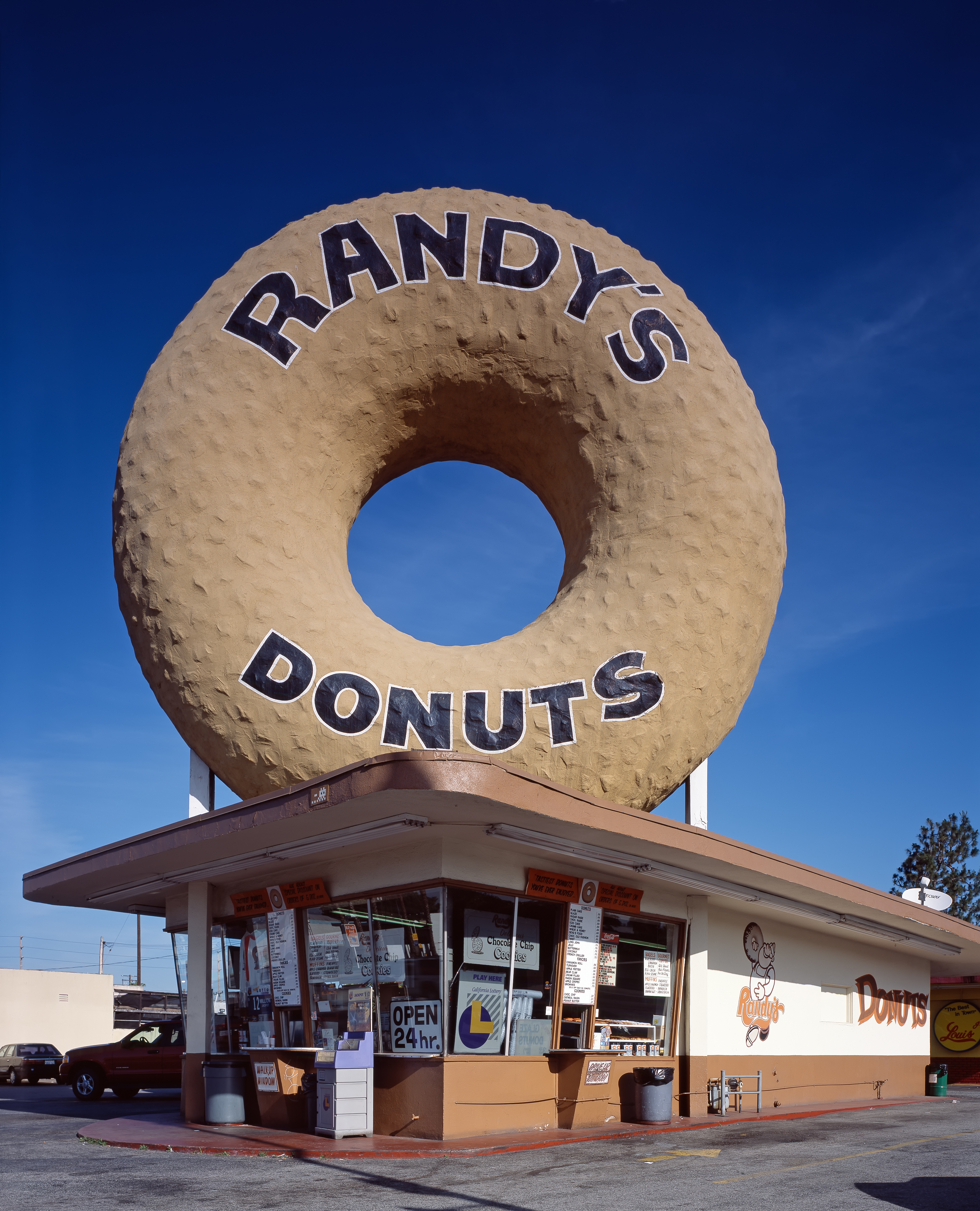
- Randy's in 2005

General information
- Type: Restaurant, doughnut shop, bakery
- Architectural style: Novelty architecture
- Location: Inglewood, California, United States
- Coordinates: 33.9618°N 118.3703°W
- Opened: 1953

Design and construction
- Architect: Henry J. Goodwin

Website
- randys-donuts.com

Randy's Donuts is a donut shop chain originated in the United States, and it is known for a colossal donut sign atop its original building located in Inglewood, California near Los Angeles International Airport, which is considered as "one of Los Angeles’ most iconic landmarks".

The original 24-hour drive-in is at 805 West Manchester Boulevard and it intersects with La Cienega Boulevard. It is near the Manchester Boulevard off-ramp of the San Diego Freeway (I-405).

== History ==
In the late 1940s, donut machine salesman Russell Wendell founded a chain of drive-in donut shops named Big Donut. The first location opened in 1951 in Westmont. The second location, which is now a Randy's Donuts, was opened in 1952.

In 1976, after shifting focus to his Pup 'N' Taco chain (bought by Taco Bell in 1984), Wendell sold the Big Donut Inglewood location to Robert Eskow who renamed the location "Randy's Donuts" after his son. In 1978, Eskow sold the shop to Ron and Larry Weintraub, who decided to retain the name for the business.

In 2015, Randy's Donuts was purchased by lawyer and entrepreneur Mark Kelegian. Since that time, the brand has added franchise locations in Southern California, Las Vegas and Phoenix; as well as locations outside of the United States such as South Korea, Saudi Arabia, the Philippines, and Japan.

Randy's Donuts opened a location at Los Angeles International Airport in 2023 and in the NoHo Arts District in 2024.

== Architecture ==
The original building was designed by Henry J. Goodwin. Bradshaw, who worked as the civil engineer on the Theme Building at Los Angeles International Airport, is said to have designed the giant donut on the roof according to the Los Angeles Conservancy. The rooftop donut is constructed out of rolled steel bars covered with gunite. It is built in a style that dates to a period in the early 20th century that saw a proliferation of Programmatic architecture throughout Southern California. This style had its heyday from the mid-1920s to the mid-1930s. By the 1950s however, the trend of designing structures in the shape of the product sold there had changed to focus on signs rather than architecture itself. Randy's is represented by a giant donut on the roof of an otherwise ordinary a Mid-century modern drive-up food stand that is a dedicated donut bakery. It is not, however, technically a programmatic architectural building since the building itself does not look like the item it sells. Still, the Los Angeles Conservancy looked "the other way" and designated Randy's Donuts as a programmatic architectural building since "the donut on its roof is just so large, so uncompromising, so demanding of our attention".

=== Donut signs ===
Colossal donut signs atop Randy's stores vary in size. Most locations use a 32 ft 6 in (9.91 m) diameter version that sits atop the building and faces an intersection. In Roadside Giant by Brian and Sarah Butko, the Weintraubs climbed on top of the donut at the original location with a tape measure and confirmed the measurements for the authors. The Bellflower location, however, features a smaller version of the donut on top of a pole in front of the building. This may be 23 feet (7.0 m) in diameter, as is widely reported. When it opened a franchise shop in Shibuya, Tokyo, a donut sign about 4 metres (13 ft) diameter was installed in front of the shop on the ground.

== Gallery ==
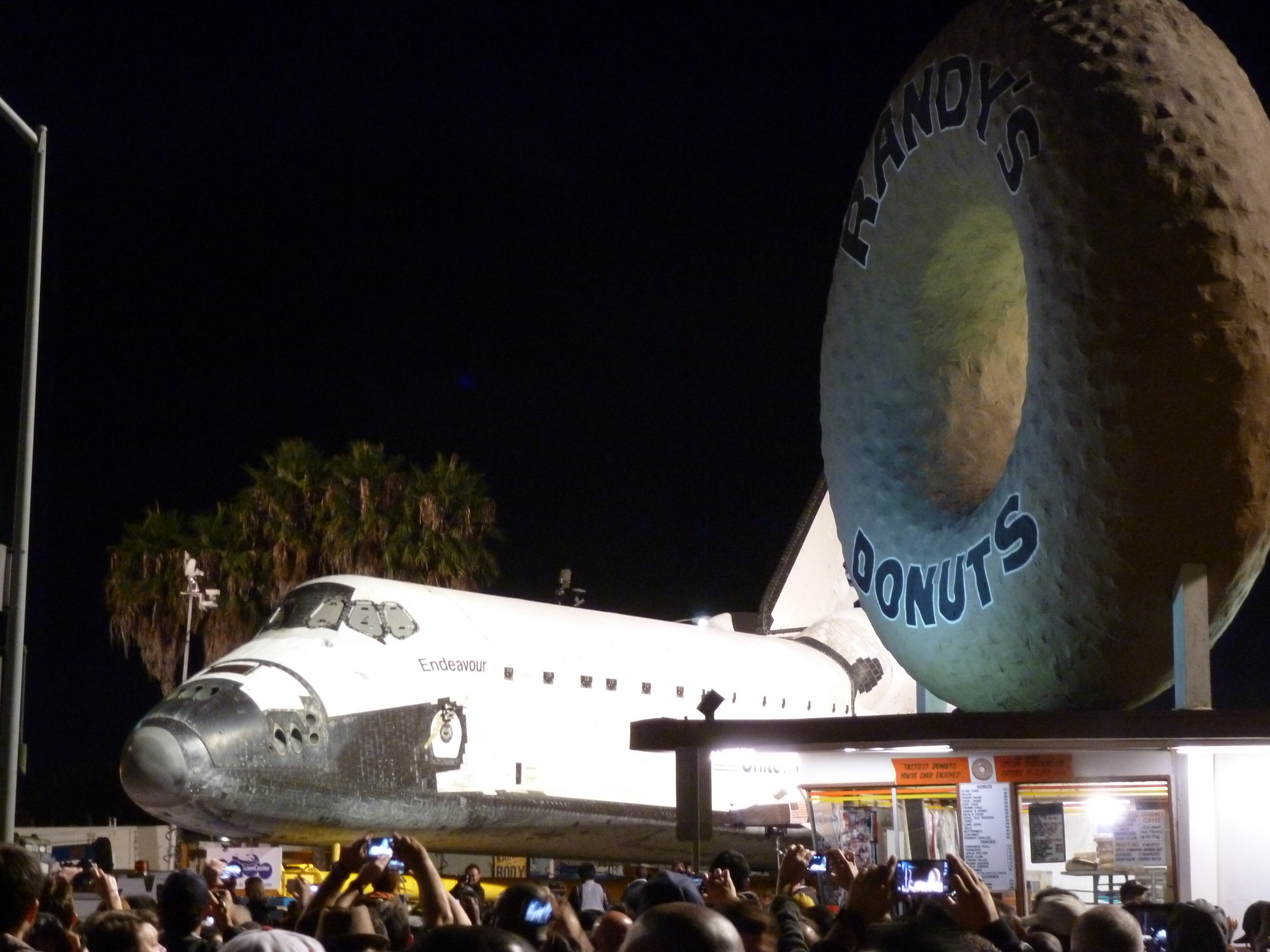
The Randy's Donuts sign alongside Space Shuttle Endeavour as it is ferried through the streets of Los Angeles on Friday, October 12, 2012.

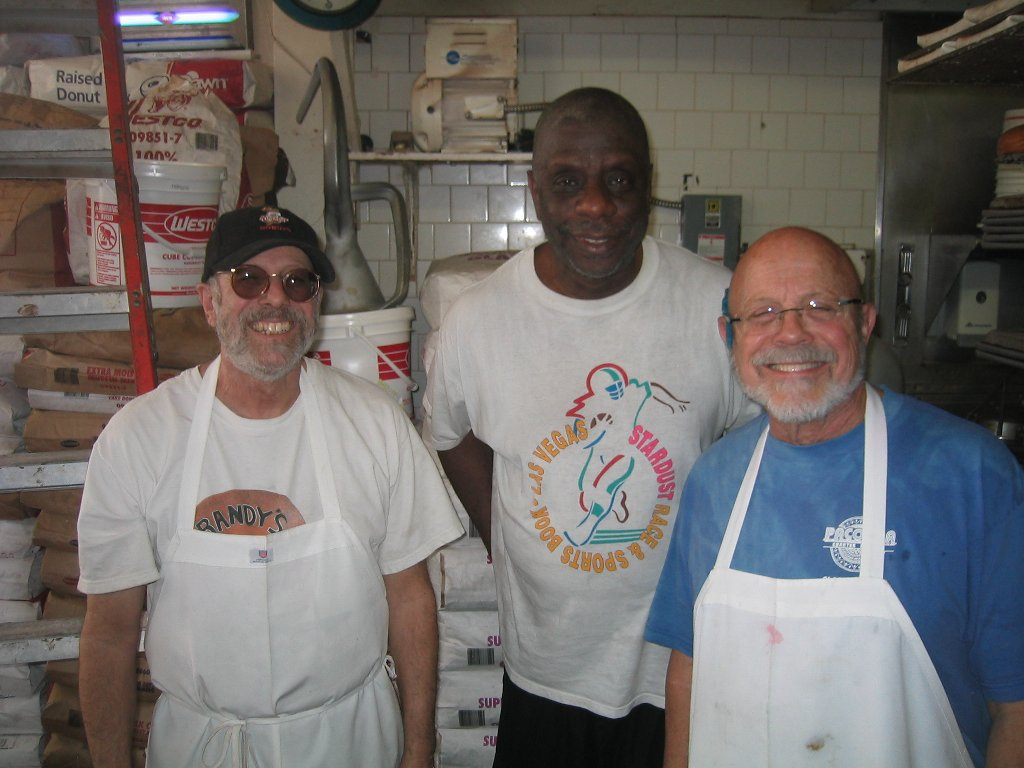
Actor and comedian Jimmie Walker with brothers Ron and Larry Weintraub, 2013

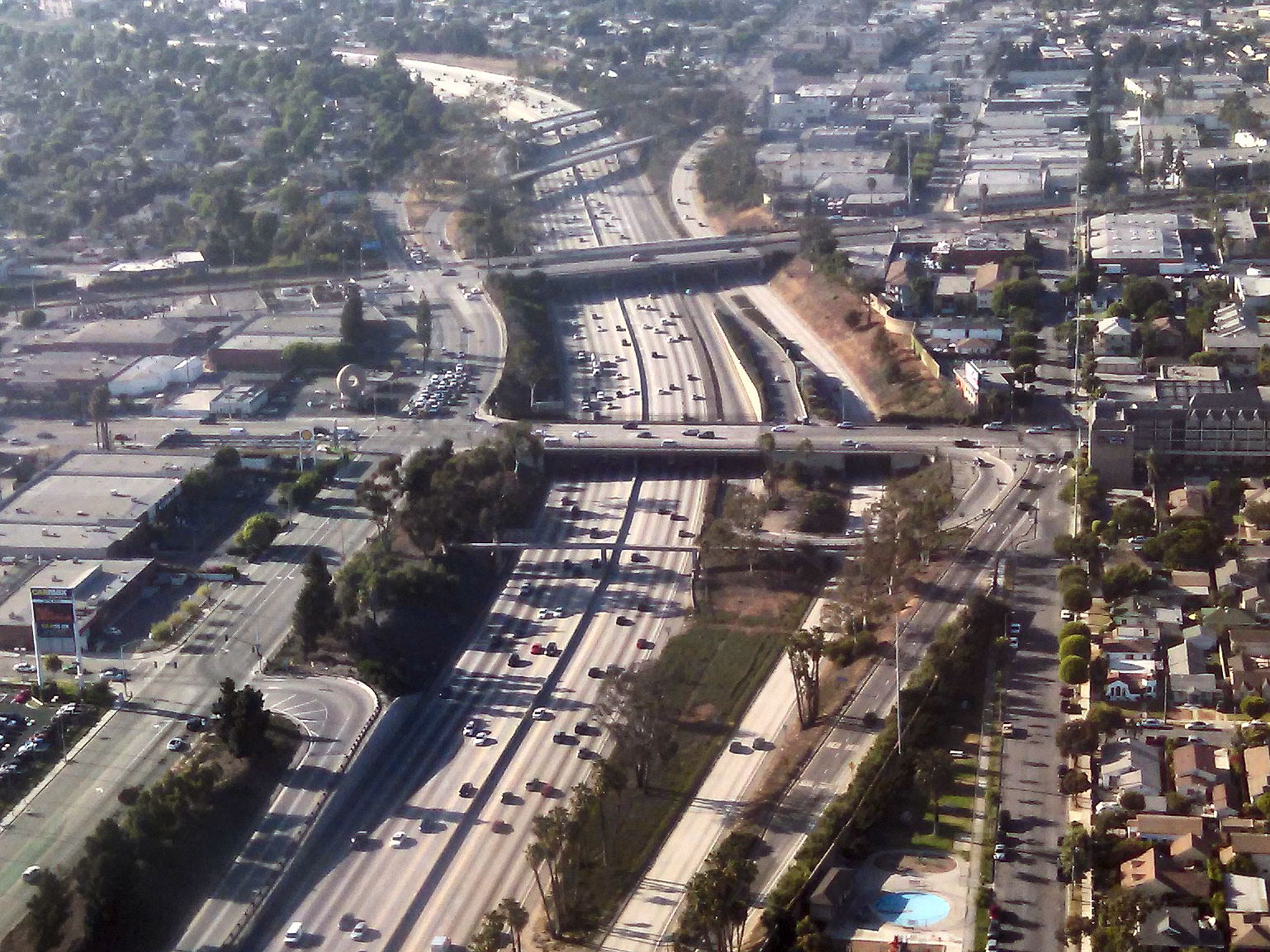
Randy's Donuts can be seen from airplanes landing at LAX (left of the foreground bridge over the freeway at Manchester Boulevard).

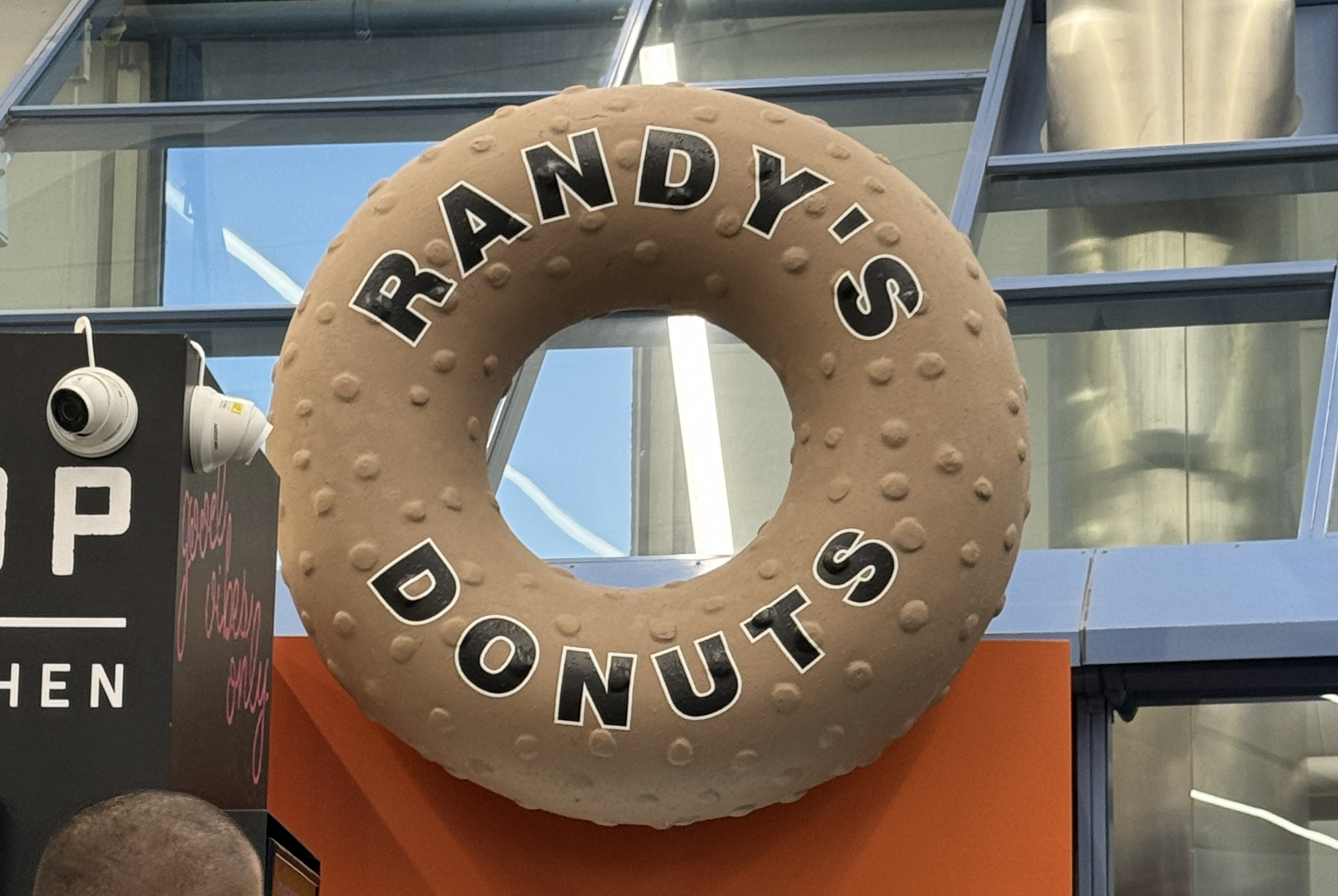
A miniature version of the Randy's Donuts sign at its LAX location.

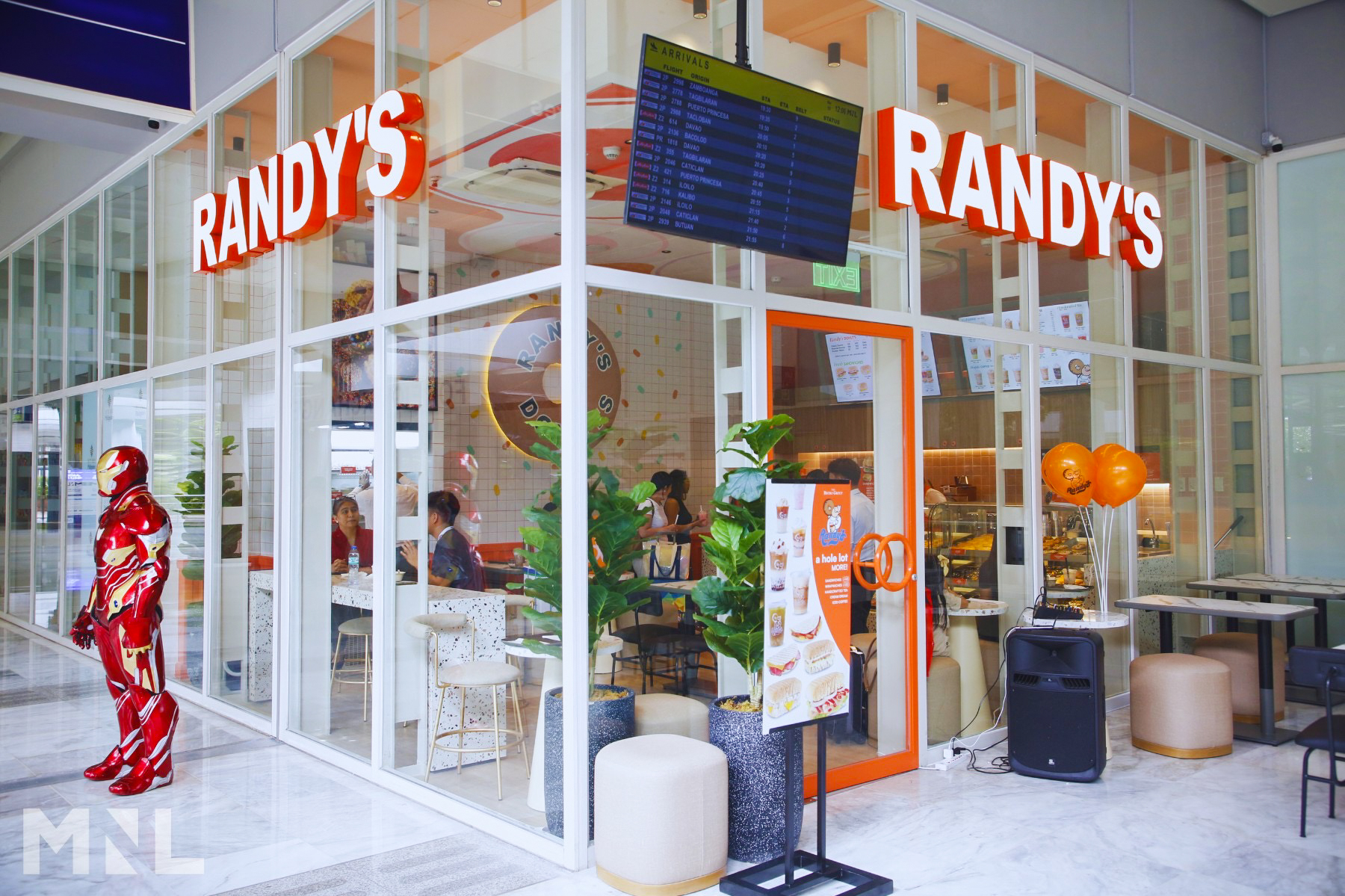
Randy's Donuts at Ninoy Aquino International Airport in Manila

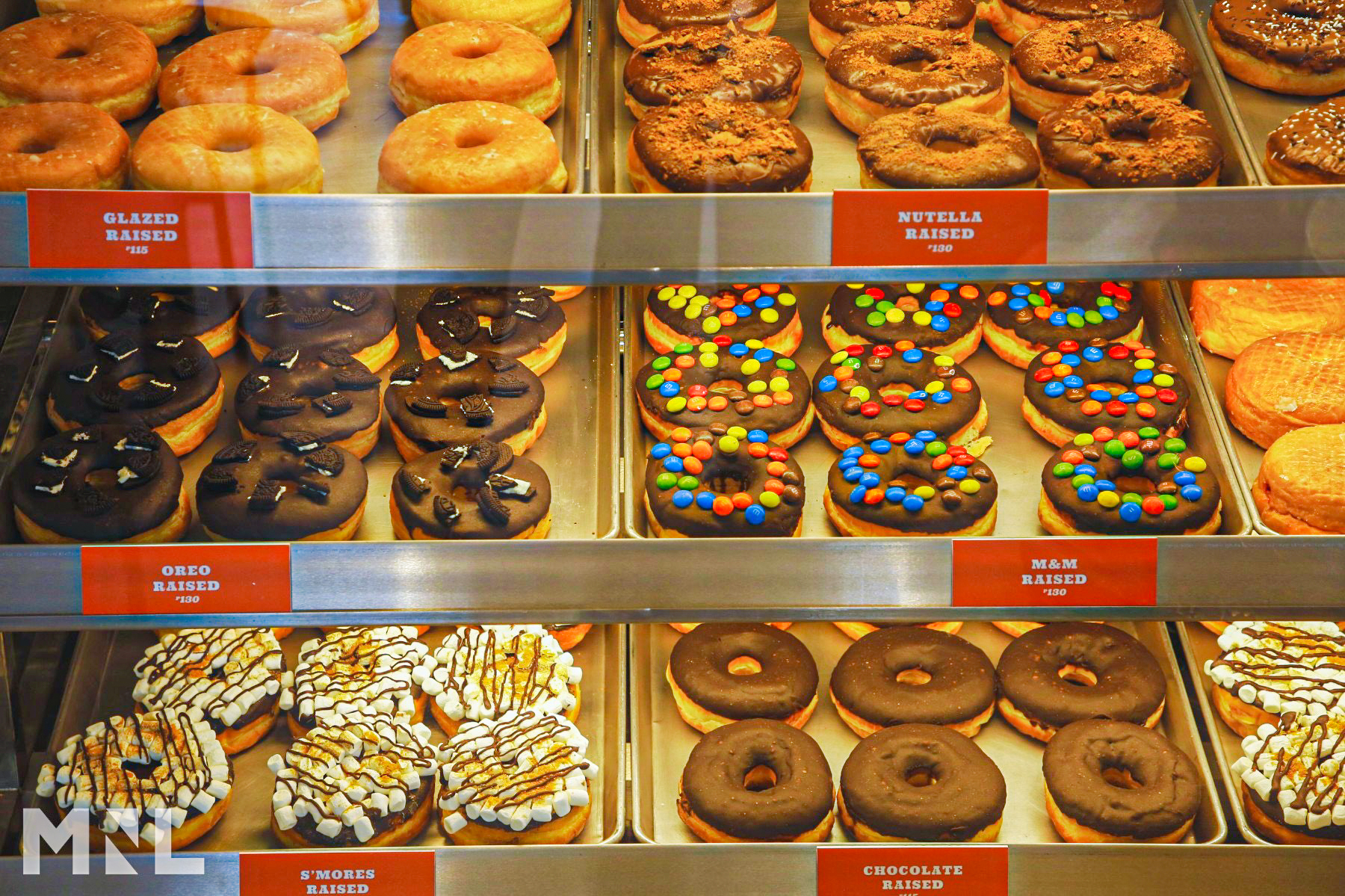
The donut flavors offered at Randy's Donuts in the Philippines

== Popular culture ==
In the 2010 film Iron Man 2, Tony Stark while wearing the Iron Man armor, eats a box of Randy's donuts while sitting inside the large Randy's Donuts sign. It apperared in other various movies such as Logorama, 2012, Crocodile Dundee, Get Shorty, Earth Girls Are Easy, Dope, The Golden Child; as well as Showtime's Californication and Futurama. Randy's Donuts also appears in Justin Timberlake's music video "Can't Stop the Feeling!".

The building was shown in the Masked Rider episode "Ferbus Maximus" where an overgrown Ferbus takes the giant donut and tries to eat it. A small replica of the donut was made for the episode.

The building is referenced on the vinyl cover for Donuts by J Dilla.

The building and sign also appears in the music video for The Prodigy 1993 hit Wind It Up.

== See also ==
- List of doughnut shops
- The Donut Hole
- Big donuts of Southern California
