= Big donuts of Southern California =

20th-century U.S. vernacular architecture

Big Do-Nut Drive-in, Inglewood, California photographed by John Margolies in 1976 (LCCN2017709532)

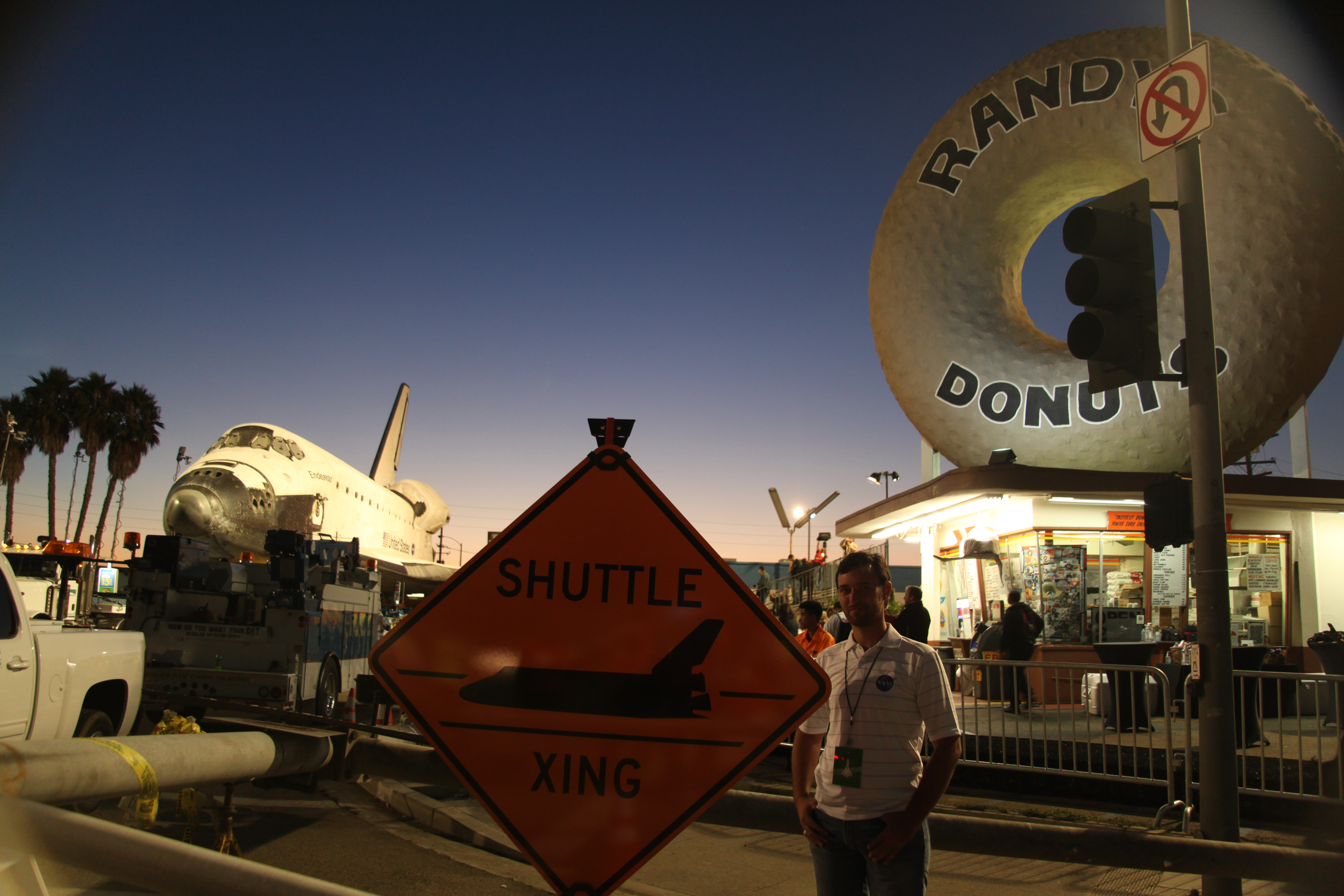
Shuttle Endeavour in front of Randy's in Inglewood, 2012

The big donuts of Southern California in the United States are frequently photographed examples of 20th-century vernacular roadside novelty architecture. They are landmark oversize donuts designed to attract the attention of potential customers on nearby roadways. In their heyday, according to one critic, the giant donuts were "one of many signs in Los Angeles that bordered on pop art, celebrating the effusiveness of life in the years after World War II. To many Americans, Southern California acquired the image of an orange juice stand shaped like an orange, or a hot dog stand shaped like a hot dog."

== History ==
Randy's Donuts along the 405 freeway near LAX is the most famous of four surviving big donuts constructed by businessman Russell C. Wendell, who started the Big Do-Nut Drive-In chain in the 1940s. (A fifth donut has been converted into a bagel.) At one time there were 10 Do-Nut Drive-Ins with 22-foot (6.7 m)-diameter giant donuts. (Or were they 30 feet high?) The grand opening of the first big donut in December 1949 had "the fanfare of a Hollywood premiere. Clowns, jugglers, and magicians performed, free coffee and donuts were handed out, and a trapeze artist swung from the middle of the donut hole."

Wendell sold out in the 1970s. Mrs. Chapman's Angel Food Donuts was another chain of about 20 stores that constructed slightly smaller big donuts to advertise their stores.

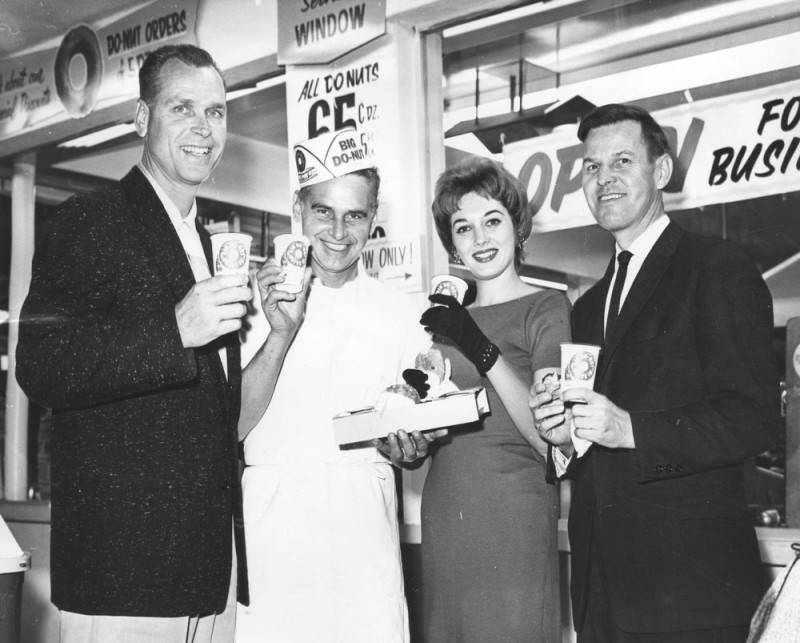
Russell C. Wendell (far left) at the 1959 opening of the Van Nuys location at the corner of Sherman Way and Kester Ave. (Los Angeles Public Library 00085568, Valley Times Photo Collection)

The Donut Hole in La Puente, jokingly described as a "distant cousin" to the rooftop big donuts, is a drive-thru bakery; the gimmick being that drivers enter and exit through the holes in a pair of giant donuts to order and pick up their food. All of these shops and their associated giant donuts are considered representative of Southern California's mid-century "car-culture-induced optimism and ambition, reflected in polychromatic, star-spangled coffee shops, gas stations, car washes, and other structures that once lured the gaze of passing motorists."

Giant donuts and similar oversize object-shaped signs and buildings are generally now prohibited under contemporary municipal construction codes.

== List of Southern California big donuts ==
An assortment of giant doughnuts in Greater Los Angeles
Store	Image	Address	Notes
Bellflower Bagels & Java		17025 Bellflower Blvd., Bellflower	Wendell Big Donut location; now a bagel
Dale's Donuts		15904 S. Atlantic Ave., Compton	Atlantic & Alondra
The Donut Hole		15300 E. Amar Rd., La Puente	
Donut King II		15032 S. Western Ave., Gardena	
Dunkin' Donuts		5560 E. 7th St., Long Beach	Originally an Angel Food Donuts, then the Daily Grind coffee shop for decades; preservationists convinced Dunkin' to save the old giant donut
Mrs. Chapman's Angel Food Donuts		3657 Santa Fe Ave., Long Beach	Only location still using the Mrs. Chapman's Angel Food donuts name
Kindle's Donuts		10003 S. Normandie Ave., L.A.	Wendell's first location; Century & Normandie
Randy's Donuts		805 W. Manchester Blvd., Inglewood	Now a chain, Downey and Costa Mesa locations of Randy's each have a newly built giant donut; Inglewood location predates the 405 freeway

== See also ==
- Springfield Doughnut
- Googie architecture
- Dingbat (building)
- 1950s American automobile culture
- Felix Chevrolet
- Commons:File:Mr. Good's Donut House, Compton, California LCCN2017709517.tif

== Sources ==
- Heimann, Jim; Gebhard, David (2018). California crazy: American pop architecture. Köln: Taschen. ISBN 978-3-8365-7283-5.
